= List of heads of state of Barbados =

This is a list of the heads of state of Barbados, from the independence of Barbados under the Barbados Independence Act 1966 to the present day.

From 30 November 1966 until 30 November 2021, the head of state was the Queen of Barbados, Elizabeth II, who was also the Monarch of the United Kingdom and the other Commonwealth realms, viceregally represented in Barbados by a Governor-General.

Since 30 November 2021, the head of state is the President of Barbados.

== Monarch (1966–2021) ==
The succession to the Barbadian throne was the same as the succession to the British throne.

No.	Monarch (Birth–Death)	Portrait	Reign			Royal House	Prime Minister
No.	Monarch (Birth–Death)	Portrait	Reign start	Reign end	Duration	Royal House	Prime Minister
1	Queen; Elizabeth II (1926–2022)		30 November 1966	30 November 2021	55 years	Windsor	Barrow; Adams; St. John; Barrow; Sandiford; Arthur; Thompson; Stuart; Mottley

=== Governors-General ===
Under the Constitution of Barbados, before its amendment in 2021, the governor-general was the viceregal representative of the monarch in Barbados and exercised most of the powers of the monarch. The governor-general was appointed for an indefinite term, serving at the pleasure of the monarch. Since Barbados was granted independence by the Barbados Independence Act 1966, rather than being first established as a semi-autonomous Dominion and later promoted to independence by the Statute of Westminster 1931, the governor-general had always been appointed solely on the advice of the Cabinet of Barbados, without the involvement of the British government, with the sole exception of John Montague Stow, the last colonial governor, who served as governor-general temporarily until he was replaced by Sir Arleigh Winston Scott. In the event of a vacancy the chief justice served as administrator of the government.

Status

Denotes Chief Justice acting as Officer Administering the Government

No.	Portrait	Governor-General (Birth–Death)	Term of office			Prime Minister	Monarch
No.	Portrait	Governor-General (Birth–Death)	Took office	Left office	Tenure	Prime Minister	Monarch
1		Sir; John Montague Stow (1911–1997)	30 November 1966	18 May 1967	169 days	Barrow	Elizabeth II (1966–2021)
2		Sir; Arleigh Winston Scott (1900–1976)	18 May 1967	9 August 1976 (Died in office)	9 years, 83 days	Barrow	Elizabeth II (1966–2021)
–		Sir; William Randolph Douglas (1921–2003)	9 August 1976	17 November 1976	100 days	Barrow; Adams	Elizabeth II (1966–2021)
3		Sir; Deighton Lisle Ward (1909–1984)	17 November 1976	9 January 1984 (Died in office)	7 years, 53 days	Adams	Elizabeth II (1966–2021)
–		Sir; William Randolph Douglas (1921–2003)	9 January 1984	24 February 1984	46 days	Adams	Elizabeth II (1966–2021)
4		Sir; Hugh Springer (1913–1994)	24 February 1984	6 June 1990	6 years, 102 days	Adams; St. John; Barrow; Sandiford	Elizabeth II (1966–2021)
5		Dame; Nita Barrow (1916–1995)	6 June 1990	19 December 1995 (Died in office)	5 years, 196 days	Sandiford; Arthur	Elizabeth II (1966–2021)
–		Sir; Denys Williams (1929–2014)	19 December 1995	1 June 1996	165 days	Arthur	Elizabeth II (1966–2021)
6		Sir; Clifford Husbands (1926–2017)	1 June 1996	31 October 2011	15 years, 152 days	Arthur; Thompson; Stuart	Elizabeth II (1966–2021)
– (Note: Judge of the Supreme Court)		Sir; Elliott Belgrave (born 1931)	1 November 2011	30 May 2012	211 days	Stuart	Elizabeth II (1966–2021)
–		Dame; Sandra Mason (born 1949)	30 May 2012	1 June 2012	2 days	Stuart	Elizabeth II (1966–2021)
7		Sir; Elliott Belgrave (born 1931)	1 June 2012	30 June 2017	5 years, 29 days	Stuart	Elizabeth II (1966–2021)
– (Note: Former Deputy Prime Minister)		Sir; Philip Greaves (born 1931)	1 July 2017	8 January 2018	191 days	Stuart	Elizabeth II (1966–2021)
8		Dame; Sandra Mason (born 1949)	8 January 2018	30 November 2021	3 years, 326 days	Stuart; Mottley	Elizabeth II (1966–2021)

== Presidents (2021–present) ==
Under the Constitution of Barbados, as amended in 2021, the position of president of Barbados replaced the monarch as head of state. The position of president is elected by parliament for a four-year term. In the event of a vacancy, or for any reason the president is unable to perform the functions conferred upon them by the constitution, those functions are performed by an acting president appointed by the prime minister, after consultation with the leader of the opposition. However, while the president is suspended from office in case of ongoing impeachment proceedings, the president of the Senate of Barbados serves as acting president. The presidential line of succession is not defined beyond that.

Denotes Acting President

No.	Portrait	President (Birth–Death)	Term of office			Election	Political affiliation	Prime Minister
No.	Portrait	President (Birth–Death)	Took office	Left office	Tenure	Election	Political affiliation	Prime Minister
1		Dame; Sandra Mason (born 1949)	30 November 2021	30 November 2025	4 years	2021	Independent	Mottley
2		Lt. Col. Jeffrey Bostic (born 1960)	30 November 2025	Incumbent	317 days	2025	Barbados Labour Party	Mottley

== Standards ==
Royal Standard

Governor-General's Standard

Presidential Standard
