= Embassy of Barbados, Washington, D.C. =

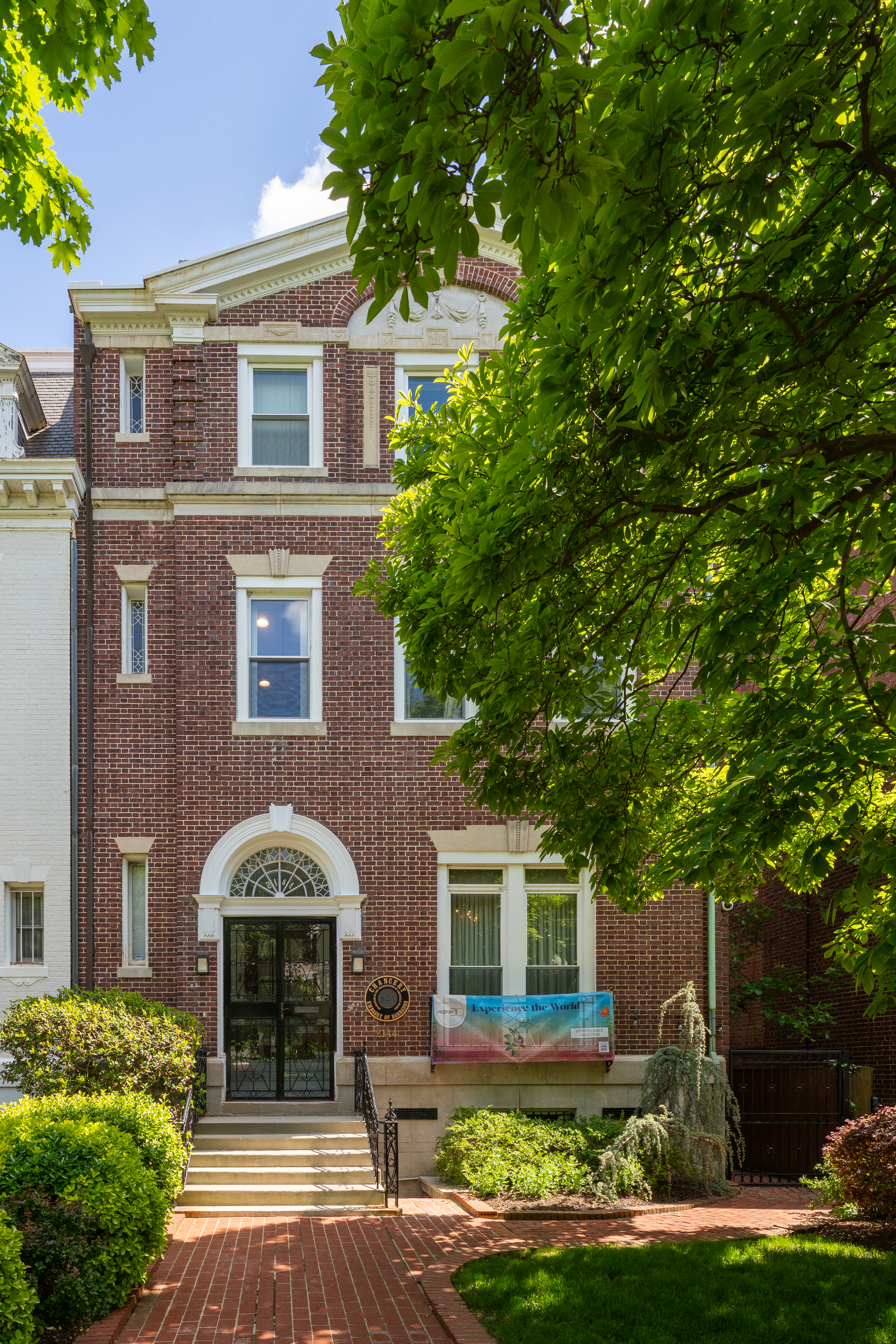
- Location: Washington, D.C. 20008
- Address: 2144 Wyoming Avenue, N.W.
- Coordinates: 38°55′1″N 77°2′55.46″W
- Ambassador: Victor Fernandes
- Website: http://www.foreign.gov.bb/

The Embassy of Barbados in Washington, D.C. is the primary diplomatic mission of Barbados to the United States of America, and the Organisation of American States (OAS). It is maintained by Ministry of Foreign Affairs and Foreign Trade Barbados. The present Ambassador is Victor Fernandes, appointed on January 6, 2024, who replaced Noel Anderson Lynch.

It is located to the East of the official Embassy Row area at 2144 Wyoming Avenue N.W. in Washington, D.C.'s Kalorama neighborhood.

== Overview ==
The embassy also operates two Consulates-General in: Miami and New York City; a Permanent Mission to the United Nations in New York City; and it is also further supported by a collection of Honorary Consulates in: Atlanta, Boston, Denver, Detroit, Houston, Los Angeles, Louisville, New Orleans, Portland, San Francisco, and Toledo.

== Heads of mission ==
Representative	Title	Appointed (presentation of credentials)	Termination of mission	Appointed by
Hilton Augustus Vaughan	Ambassador Extraordinary and Plenipotentiary	December 1, 1967	–	Errol Barrow (G.G. John Montague Stow)
Valerie Theodore McComie	Ambassador Extraordinary and Plenipotentiary	September 1, 1968	–	Errol Barrow (G.G. Arleigh Winston Scott)
Fozlo Brewster	Counselor, Charge d'Affaires ad interim	May 22, 1974	–	Errol Barrow (G.G. Arleigh Winston Scott)
Cecil Beaumont Williams	Ambassador Extraordinary and Plenipotentiary	June 25, 1974 (August 19, 1974)	–	Errol Barrow (G.G. Arleigh Winston Scott)
Fozlo Brewster	Counselor, Charge d'Affaires ad interim	December 16, 1975	–	Errol Barrow (G.G. Arleigh Winston Scott)
Maurice A. King	Ambassador Extraordinary and Plenipotentiary	January 28, 1976 (February 9, 1976)	–	Errol Barrow (G.G. Arleigh Winston Scott)
Ralphston Orlando Marville	Counselor, Charge d'Affaires ad interim	September 24, 1976	–	John "Tom" Adams (G. G. William Douglas)
Oliver Hamlet Jackman	Ambassador Extraordinary and Plenipotentiary	May 13, 1977 (May 16, 1977)	–	John "Tom" Adams (G. G. Deighton Lisle Ward)
Ralphston Orlando Marville	Charge d'Affaires ad interim	December 26, 1980	–	John "Tom" Adams (G. G. Deighton Lisle Ward)
Charles A. T. Skeete	Ambassador Extraordinary and Plenipotentiary	February 4, 1981 (February 24, 1981)	–	John "Tom" Adams (G. G. Deighton Lisle Ward)
Clifton Maynard	Minister-Counselor, Charge d'Affaires ad interim	July 28, 1983)	–	John "Tom" Adams (G. G. Deighton Lisle Ward)
Peter Douglas Laurie	Ambassador Extraordinary and Plenipotentiary	November 15, 1983 (November 21, 1983)	–	John "Tom" Adams (G. G. Deighton Lisle Ward)
Sir William Randolph Douglas	Ambassador Extraordinary and Plenipotentiary	April 7, 1987 (May 11, 1987)	–	Errol Barrow (G. G. Hugh Springer)
Dr. Rudi Valentine Webster	Ambassador Extraordinary and Plenipotentiary	November 5, 1991 (November 25, 1991)	–	Erskine Sandiford (G. G. Ruth Nita Barrow)
Dr. Sir Courtney N. Blackman, KA	Ambassador Extraordinary and Plenipotentiary	February 8, 1995 (March 20, 1995)	–	Owen Seymour Arthur (G. G. Ruth Nita Barrow)
Michael Ian King	Ambassador Extraordinary and Plenipotentiary	October 10, 2000 (December 7, 2000)	–	Owen Seymour Arthur (G. G. Sir Clifford Husbands)
John Ernest Beale	Ambassador Extraordinary and Plenipotentiary	January 29, 2009 (May 20, 2000)	June 30, 2016	David Thompson (G. G. Sir Clifford Husbands)
Selwin Charles Hart	Ambassador Extraordinary and Plenipotentiary	November 1, 2016 (January 18, 2017)	August 15, 2018	Freundel Stuart (G.G. Sir Eliot Belgrave)
Noel Anderson Lynch	Ambassador Extraordinary and Plenipotentiary	October 1, 2018 (January 11, 2019)	Current	Mia Amor Mottley (G.G. Dame Sandra Mason)

== History of visits ==
- List of diplomatic visits to the United States: North America and the Caribbean#Barbados

== Chancery building history ==
Former entities located at 2144 Wyoming:

- James Horatio Watmough (~1912– ~1917), Naval Officer
- Katharine Price Collier (~1918)
- Mabel Grouitch (June 1919)
- Frank L. Smith, U.S. House of Representatives (~1920)
- Legation of Finland 1940–1950
- Austria (~1953– ~1956)
- Embassy of Morocco ( ~1958–1962)
- Embassy of Syrian Arab Republic (~1962–1965)

== See also ==
- Diplomatic missions of Barbados
- Embassy of the United States in Barbados
- List of diplomatic missions in Washington, D.C.
- Barbados – United States relations
