= List of prime ministers of Barbados =

This is a list of prime ministers of Barbados.

== Premiers of Barbados (1954–1966) ==
=== Queen Elizabeth II in right of the United Kingdom (1954–66) ===
Barbados Labour (2) Democratic Labour (1)
No.	Portrait	Name (Birth–Death)	Election	Term of office			Political party	Governor
No.	Portrait	Name (Birth–Death)	Election	Took office	Left office	Time in office	Political party	Governor
1		The Right Excellent; Sir Grantley Herbert Adams; CMG QC; MP for Saint Joseph (1898–1971)	1951	1 February 1954	17 April 1958	4 years, 75 days	BLP	Savage Arundell
1		The Right Excellent; Sir Grantley Herbert Adams; CMG QC; MP for Saint Joseph (1898–1971)	1956	1 February 1954	17 April 1958	4 years, 75 days	BLP	Savage Arundell
2		Hugh Gordon Cummins; MP for Saint Thomas (1891–1970)	—	17 April 1958	8 December 1961	3 years, 235 days	BLP	Arundell Stow
3		The Right Excellent; Errol Barrow; PC QC; MP for Saint John (1920–1987)	1961	8 December 1961	30 November 1966	4 years, 357 days	DLP	Stow

== Prime Ministers of Barbados (1966–present) ==
=== Queen Elizabeth II in right of Barbados (1966–2021) ===
Democratic Labour Party (4) Barbados Labour Party (4)
No.	Portrait	Name (Birth–Death)	Election	Term of office			Political party	Governor-General
No.	Portrait	Name (Birth–Death)	Election	Took office	Left office	Time in office	Political party	Governor-General
1		The Right Excellent; Errol Barrow; PC QC; MP for Saint John (1920–1987)	1966	30 November 1966	8 September 1976	9 years, 283 days	DLP	Stow Scott
1		The Right Excellent; Errol Barrow; PC QC; MP for Saint John (1920–1987)	1971	30 November 1966	8 September 1976	9 years, 283 days	DLP	Stow Scott
2		The Right Honourable; Tom Adams; QC; MP for Saint Thomas (1931–1985)	1976	8 September 1976	11 March 1985^{[†]}	8 years, 184 days	BLP	Ward Springer
2		The Right Honourable; Tom Adams; QC; MP for Saint Thomas (1931–1985)	1981	8 September 1976	11 March 1985^{[†]}	8 years, 184 days	BLP	Ward Springer
3		The Right Honourable; Sir Harold Bernard St. John; KA; MP for Christ Church East Central (1931–2004)	—	11 March 1985	29 May 1986	1 year, 79 days	BLP	Springer
(1)		The Right Excellent; Errol Barrow; PC QC; MP for Saint John (1920–1987)	1986	29 May 1986	1 June 1987^{[†]}	1 year, 3 days	DLP	Springer
4		The Right Honourable; Sir Lloyd Erskine Sandiford; KA PC; MP for Saint Michael South (1937–2023)	—	1 June 1987	7 September 1994	7 years, 98 days	DLP	Springer Barrow
4		The Right Honourable; Sir Lloyd Erskine Sandiford; KA PC; MP for Saint Michael South (1937–2023)	1991	1 June 1987	7 September 1994	7 years, 98 days	DLP	Springer Barrow
5		The Right Honourable; Owen Arthur; PC; MP for Saint Peter (1949–2020)	1994	See also § Arthur Cabinet			BLP	Barrow Husbands
5		The Right Honourable; Owen Arthur; PC; MP for Saint Peter (1949–2020)	1994	7 September 1994	16 January 2008	13 years, 131 days	BLP	Barrow Husbands
5		The Right Honourable; Owen Arthur; PC; MP for Saint Peter (1949–2020)	1999	7 September 1994	16 January 2008	13 years, 131 days	BLP	Barrow Husbands
5		The Right Honourable; Owen Arthur; PC; MP for Saint Peter (1949–2020)	2003	7 September 1994	16 January 2008	13 years, 131 days	BLP	Barrow Husbands
6		The Honourable; David Thompson; QC; MP for Saint John (1961–2010)	2008	16 January 2008	23 October 2010^{[†]}	2 years, 280 days	DLP	Husbands
7		The Right Honourable; Freundel Stuart; PC QC; MP for Saint Michael South (born 1951)	—	See also § Stuart Cabinet			DLP	Husbands Belgrave Mason
7		The Right Honourable; Freundel Stuart; PC QC; MP for Saint Michael South (born 1951)	—	23 October 2010	25 May 2018	7 years, 214 days	DLP	Husbands Belgrave Mason
7		The Right Honourable; Freundel Stuart; PC QC; MP for Saint Michael South (born 1951)	2013	23 October 2010	25 May 2018	7 years, 214 days	DLP	Husbands Belgrave Mason
8		The Honourable; Mia Mottley; QC; MP for Saint Michael North East (born 1965)	2018	25 May 2018	30 November 2021	3 years, 189 days	BLP	Mason

=== Republic (2021–present) ===
Barbados Labour (1)
No.	Portrait	Name (Birth–Death)	Election	Term of office			Political party	President
No.	Portrait	Name (Birth–Death)	Election	Took office	Left office	Time in office	Political party	President
(8)		The Honourable; Mia Mottley; QC; MP for Saint Michael North East (born 1965)	2022	30 November 2021	Incumbent	4 years, 317 days	BLP	Mason Bostic
(8)		The Honourable; Mia Mottley; QC; MP for Saint Michael North East (born 1965)	2026	30 November 2021	Incumbent	4 years, 317 days	BLP	Mason Bostic

== Timeline ==
This is a graphical lifespan timeline of the prime ministers of Barbados. They are listed in order of first assuming office.

The following chart lists prime ministers by lifespan (living prime ministers on the green line), with the years outside of their tenure in beige.

== See also ==
- Ilaro Court
- Elections in Barbados
- Politics of Barbados
- Prime Minister of the West Indies Federation
- Governor-General of Barbados
- List of Commonwealth of Nations prime ministers
- List of current members of the British Privy Council

== Notes ==
^† Died in office.
