= Order of precedence in Barbados =

Relative preeminence of officials for ceremonial purposes

The following is the Barbadian Table of Precedence.

1. The President of Barbados (Jeffrey Bostic)
2. The Prime Minister (Mia Mottley)
3. The Chief Justice (Leslie Haynes)
4. The Members of the Cabinet
  1. The Attorney-General of Barbados, as the first minister to be sworn in after the Prime Minister.
  2. Other cabinet ministers, their own order unknown.
5. The former Governors-General (Sir Elliott Belgrave)
6. The National Hero (Rihanna)
7. The President of the Senate (Reginald Farley)
8. The Speaker of the House of Assembly (Arthur Holder)
9. The Leader of the Opposition
10. The former Prime Ministers, and the former Chief Justices
11. The Members of the President's Privy Council of Barbados
12. The Chairman of the Barbados Christian Council
13. The Ambassadors and High Commissioners
14. The Justices of the Court of Appeals, and the Judges of the High Court
15. The Parliamentary Secretaries
16. The Deputy President of the Senate
17. The Deputy Speaker of the House of Assembly
18. The Members of the Senate
19. The Members of the House of Assembly
20. The spouses of deceased dignitaries such as: Governors-General, Prime Ministers, and National Heroes (Suo jure/Jure uxoris ascribed)
21. The Chairmen of the Commissions established under the Constitution
22. The Head of the Civil Service
23. The Ombudsman, Director of Public Prosecutions, and Auditor General
24. The Director of Finance and Economic Affairs, the Solicitor General, the Chief Parliamentary Counsel, the Permanent Secretaries, and the Governor of the Central Bank
25. The Ambassadors/High Commission (Overseas)
26. The Chief of Staff for the Barbados Defence Force, and the Commissioner of Police
27. 1. The Chancellor, University of the West Indies; 2. The Chairman;The Cave Hill Campus Council, University of the West Indies; 3. The Principal, Cave Hill Campus; and the Pro Vice Chancellor of the University of the West Indies.
28. The former Ministers
29. The Members of The Order of the Caribbean Community, and the holders of knighthoods conferred under the monarchy of Barbados.
30. The holders of the Companion of Honour of Barbados
31. The holders of the Companions of the Order of St. Michael and St. George
32. The Heads of the regional bodies with diplomatic status.
33. The Related grades, and the Clerk of Parliament
34. The Chargé d'affaires and Acting High Commissioners, Deputy High Commissioners, Counsellors in Embassies, High Commissions and Legations, Consul-General - Chefs de Poste
35. The Consuls - Chefs de Posts
36. The Members of the Commissions established under the Constitution
37. The Chairmen of Statutory Boards
38. The Heads of Government Departments, including the Chief Technical Officers of departments integrated in Ministries, The Chief Magistrate, and the Chief Executive Officers of Statutory Boards
39. Honorary Consuls, Vice-Consuls in Embassies, and High Commissions and Legations

== See also ==
- Government of Barbados
- Order of precedence
- List of heads of state by diplomatic precedence
