= Order of National Heroes =

Highest civilian honor of Barbados

Awarded by President of Barbados
- Type: National Honour
- Established: 20 April 1998; 28 years ago
- Criteria: At the pleasure of the president with the recommendation of the prime minister
- Status: Currently constituted
- Founder: Parliament of Barbados
- Chancellor: Jeffrey Bostic (President of Barbados)
- Secretary: Vacant
- Classes: Member (National Hero)

Statistics
- First induction: 1998
- Last induction: 2021
- Total inductees: 11

Precedence
- Next (higher): None
- Next (lower): Order of Freedom of Barbados

The Order of National Heroes is the supreme honour within the national honours system of Barbados and was established by the Order of National Heroes Act 1998 by the Parliament of Barbados. Members are referred to as National Heroes, and are accorded the style "The Right Excellent". The Order recognises the most prominent figures in Barbados' history. As of July 2026, Rihanna is the only living person conferred with the title.

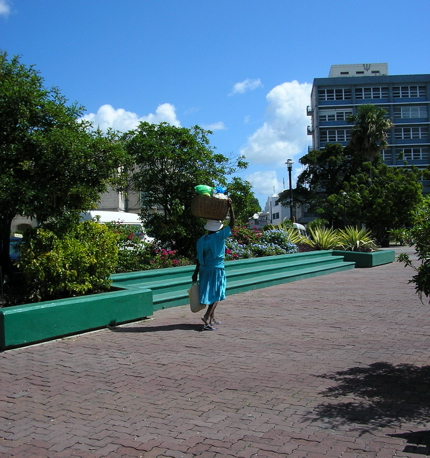
Heroes Square, formerly known as Trafalgar Square in Bridgetown.

== History ==
The first National Heroes Day was celebrated on 28 April 1998, the centenary of the birth of Grantley Adams. On the same day, Trafalgar Square was renamed National Heroes Square.

Eleven people have been created National Heroes of Barbados to date, of which ten were nominated by Prime Minister Owen Arthur and formally appointed by the Governor-General in 1998, in accordance with the Act. Of the original ten, only Frank Leslie Walcott and Sir Garfield Sobers were living at the time of their appointment.

In 2021, the Government started a search for new National Heroes. Citizens were encouraged to nominate people who they thought qualified for the high honour. The government of Barbados ultimately chose singer Rihanna for this honour, which was conferred upon her on the day Barbados transitioned to a republic.

The president, being the legal successor to the governor-general, adopted the latter's role and duties of appointing national heroes after Barbados became a republic in 2021.

The National Heroes' Day is now celebrated on every 28 April as a public holiday.

== National Heroes ==
- The Right Excellent Bussa (also known as Busso or Bussoe) (died 1816)
- The Right Excellent Sarah Ann Gill (1795–1866)
- The Right Excellent Samuel Jackman Prescod (1806–1871)
- The Right Excellent Charles Duncan O'Neal (1879–1936)
- The Right Excellent Sir Grantley Herbert Adams CMG, QC (1898–1971)
- The Right Excellent Clement Osbourne Payne (1904–1941)
- The Right Excellent Sir Hugh Worrell Springer GCMG, CBE (1913–1994)
- The Right Excellent Sir Frank Leslie Walcott KA, OBE (1916–1999)
- The Right Excellent Errol Walton Barrow PC, QC (1920–1987)
- The Right Excellent Sir Garfield St Aubrun Sobers AO, OCC (1936–2026)
- The Right Excellent Robyn Rihanna Fenty (born 1988)

== National Heroes Gallery ==
The Barbados National Heroes Gallery, located in the Museum of Parliament, traces the lives and contributions made by the National Heroes.

The West Wing of Parliament, including the National Heroes Gallery, was closed in 2020 due to environmental issues. The government was criticized for leaving it in a state of abandonment and open to robberies.

== See also ==
- Table of precedence for Barbados at number 6.
- Order of the National Hero (Jamaica), similar award
