= List of post-nominal letters (Barbados) =

This is a list of post-nominal letters used in Barbados after a person's name in order to indicate their positions, qualifications, memberships, or other status.

The said orders and decorations and their post-nominals are placed after the Barbados Jubilee Honour.

== List of post-nominal letters ==
Office	Post-nominal
Order of National Heroes
National Hero	NH
Order of Barbados (2021–present)
Member of the Order of Freedom of Barbados	FB
Member of the Order of the Republic	OR
Gold Award of Achievement	GA
Gold Trident of Excellence	GTE
Silver Trident of Excellence	STE
Barbados Service Star	BSS
Barbados Service Medal	BSM
Order of Barbados (1980-2021)
Knight of St Andrew	KA
Dame of St Andrew	DA
Companion of Honour of Barbados	CHB (sometimes ChB)
Gold Crown of Merit	GCM
Silver Crown of Merit	SCM
Barbados Service Star	BSS
Barbados Service Medal	BSM
Bravery Decorations
Barbados Star of Gallantry	SG
Barbados Bravery Medal	BM
Military Honours
Meritorious Service Cross	MSC
Meritorious Service Star	MSS
Meritorious Service Medal	MSM
Efficiency Decoration	ED
Efficiency Medal	EM
Miscellaneous Honours
Barbados Jubilee Honour	BJH
Barbados Centennial Honour	BCH
Justice of the Peace
Justice of the Peace	JP
Judicial Appointments
Senior Counsel	SC
Parliament of Barbados
Member of Parliament	MP
