= Charles Skeete =

Barbadian economist and diplomat

Ambassador of Barbados to the United States
- In office February 4, 1981 – July 28, 1983
- Prime Minister: Tom Adams
- Preceded by: Oliver H Jackman
- Succeeded by: Peter Laurie

Personal details
- Born: December 20, 1937 St. Michael, Barbados
- Died: December 9, 2017 (aged 79) Fairfax, Virginia
- Spouse: Joylyn Skeete

Charles A. "Charlie" Skeete (c. 1938 – December 9, 2017) was a Barbadian economist and diplomat. He served as Barbados' Ambassador to the United States from 1981 to 1983 and Permanent Representative of Barbados to the Organization of American States (OAS) during the 1980s.

A graduate of the University of the West Indies, Skeete became one of the Caribbean's leading economists. In the 1980s, Skeete was appointed to the committee that analyzed the economies and social development of the member states of the Caribbean Community (CARICOM).

Prior to his career as a diplomat, Skeete served as the Permanent Secretary of Barbados’ Ministry of Finance. He advised and consulted for several of Barbados governments and prime ministers, including Prime Ministers Errol Barrow and Tom Adams. In the early 1980s, Prime Minister Tom Adams appointed Skeete as the country's lead negotiator during negotiations with the International Monetary Fund for an IMF Stand-By Arrangement.

Skeete served as Ambassador to the United States from 1981 until 1983, as well as Permanent Representative of Barbados to the Organization of American States (OAS).

He first became the representative for the English-speaking Caribbean on the Inter-American Development Bank's executive board. He then served as a senior economic adviser for the Inter-American Development Bank, based in Washington, D.C., for more than thirty years.

In 2006, Skeete's alma mater, the Combermere School, inducted him into its Blue Ribbon Class of distinguished alumni.

Charlie Skeete died at his home in Fairfax, Virginia, in the United States, on December 9, 2017, at the age of 79. he was survived by his wife, Joylyn Skeete, and son, Nicholas Skeete.
