= William Randolph Douglas =

Barbadian politician

The Right Honourable Sir William Douglas KCMG PC

Acting Governor-General of Barbados
- In office 9 August 1976 – 17 November 1976
- Monarch: Elizabeth II
- Prime Minister: Errol Barrow; Tom Adams
- Preceded by: Arleigh Scott
- Succeeded by: Deighton Ward
- In office 10 January 1984 – 24 February 1984
- Monarch: Elizabeth II
- Prime Minister: Tom Adams
- Preceded by: Deighton Ward
- Succeeded by: Hugh Springer

Personal details
- Born: 24 September 1921 British Windward Islands (present day Barbados)
- Died: 12 August 2003 (aged 81) Bridgetown, Barbados
- Spouse(s): Thelma Douglas (died. 1992); Denise Douglas (m. 1997)

Sir William Randolph Douglas KCMG PC (24 September 1921 – 12 August 2003) was a Barbadian politician who served as Chief Justice of Barbados from 1965 to 1986, and twice served as the acting Governor-General: from 9 August 1976 until 17 November 1976, and again from 10 January 1984 until 24 February 1984. Between 1987 and 1991, Douglas served as ambassador to the United States.
