= Cecil Williams (cricketer) =

Barbadian cricketer

Personal information
- Full name: Cecil Beaumont Williams
- Born: 8 March 1926; Cats Castle, St Michael, Barbados
- Died: 20 September 1998 (aged 72); Pickering, Ontario, Canada
- Nickname: Monty, Boogles
- Batting: Right-handed
- Bowling: Right-arm leg-spin

Domestic team information
- Years: Team
- 1947–48 to 1956–57: Barbados

Career statistics
Competition	First-class
Matches	37
Runs scored	987
Batting average	29.02
100s/50s	2/5
Top score	133
Balls bowled	4501
Wickets	75
Bowling average	29.10
5 wickets in innings	4
10 wickets in match	0
Best bowling	7/55
Catches/stumpings	27/–
- Source: Cricinfo, 12 July 2018

Cecil Beaumont "Monty" Williams OBE (8 March 1926 – 20 September 1998) was a Barbadian cricketer who played first-class cricket for Barbados from 1948 to 1956. He later served as a Barbadian high commissioner and ambassador.

== Education ==
Cecil Williams was born in St Michael Parish, Barbados, in a family of 10 children. He went to school at Harrison College in Bridgetown, and won scholarships to Codrington College in Barbados and Durham University in England. He taught at Harrison College before being awarded a scholarship to study at New College, Oxford.

== Cricket career ==
Williams was a middle-order batsman and leg-spin and googly bowler. He played two matches for Barbados against the touring MCC in 1947–48 with only moderate success, but made a big impression in his two matches against Trinidad in 1948–49, scoring 108 in one match and taking 6 for 28 in the other.

He was expected to be prominent among the West Indies team that toured England in 1950, but the younger spinners Sonny Ramadhin and Alf Valentine were so successful in the Tests, taking 59 wickets between them, that Williams was unable to force his way into the Test team. Wisden did note, however, that he showed "much promise". He achieved his best first-class bowling figures in the match against MCC at Lord's, when he took 7 for 55 in the second innings.

He captained Barbados in two first-class matches against E. W. Swanton's XI in 1955–56, scoring 133 in the second match. He played for a West Indies XI against E. W. Swanton's XI in the last match of the tour.

After Williams retired from the game, he served on the board of management of the Barbados Cricket Association.

== Diplomatic career ==
In 1954, Williams joined the Barbados civil service, rising to Permanent Secretary in the Ministry of Education by 1958. After his studies at Oxford, he became in turn High Commissioner to Canada, Ambassador to the United States and High Commissioner to the UK. He was awarded the OBE in 1963 and made a Companion of Honour of Barbados in 1982.

On retirement from the diplomatic service in 1979, Williams joined Barbados Shipping and Trading, Barbados's largest company, in an executive position.

== Personal life ==
Williams married Dorothy Marshall in 1952. They had two sons and a daughter. He died of cancer in Toronto in September 1998, aged 72.

One of his brothers, Sir Denys Williams, was Chief Justice of Barbados from 1987 to 2002.
