= Orders, decorations, and medals of Barbados =

The Barbados National Honours and Decorations system is similar to that of the United Kingdom. Likewise, it consists of three types of award – honours, decorations and medals. Appointments are made on a yearly basis on Independence Day by the president of Barbados.

Before the transition to a parliamentary republican system, Barbadians were conferred honours in the British honours system as well until recently. This ceased with the creation of the Republic of Barbados and the replacement of the positions of Queen of Barbados and Governor-General of Barbados with the position of President of Barbados as head of state.

Appointments of Knights and Dames of the Order of St. Andrew have also ceased.

== Structure ==
=== Orders of merit ===
- Order of National Heroes
- Within the Order of Barbados:
  - Order of Freedom of Barbados
  - Order of the Republic

=== Decorations and awards ===
- Being part of the Order of Barbados:
  - Gold Award of Achievement
  - Trident of Excellence
  - Barbados Service Award
  - Barbados Services Medal of Honour
  - Barbados Humanitarian Service Award
  - Award of Pride of Barbados
  - Prime Minister's Award for Leadership
- Barbados Bravery Decorations:
  - Barbados Star of Gallantry
  - Barbados Bravery Medal

=== Miscellaneous ===
- Barbados Jubilee Honour
- Barbados Centennial Honour

== Former decorations and awards ==
- Within the Order of Barbados:
  - Knight or Dame of St Andrew
  - Companion of Honour of Barbados
  - Crown of Merit

== Style ==
Knights and Dames of St Andrew within the former Order of Barbados of the Commonwealth Realm of Barbados attach Sir or Dame before their names, and use their corresponding post-nominals after their name, e.g. Sir John Smith, KA, or Dame Jane Smith, DA.

Members of the Order of National Heroes are referred to as "National Hero", and are accorded the style The Right Excellent.

Recipients of the Order of Freedom of Barbados receive the style The Most Honourable, and they also use their corresponding post-nominal letters "FB".

Companions of Honour of the former Order of Barbados of the Commonwealth Realm of Barbados, as well as Members of the current Order of the Republic, are accorded the style The Honourable, and with respectively the post-nominals "CHB" or "OR".

Recipients of the other decorations and awards do not receive a style, but they may attach the according postnominal letters to their name, e.g., John Smith, BSS.
