= Gilbert Elliott (cricketer) =

Barbadian cricketer

Personal information
- Full name: Gilbert Elliott
- Born: 21 April 1870; Bridgetown, Saint Michael, Barbados
- Died: Unknown
- Batting: Unknown
- Bowling: Unknown
- Relatives: Greenidge Elliott (brother)

Career statistics
Competition	First-class
Matches	5
Runs scored	78
Batting average	13.00
100s/50s	0/0
Top score	36*
Balls bowled	60
Wickets	1
Bowling average	29.00
5 wickets in innings	0
10 wickets in match	0
Best bowling	1/13
Catches/stumpings	3/–
- Source: Cricinfo, 29 March 2019

Gilbert Elliott (21 April 1870 – date of death unknown) was a Barbadian first-class cricketer.

Gilbert was educated born at Bridgetown, where he was educated at Harrison College. After leaving Harrison College, he travelled to England to study medicine. He returned to Barbados with Arthur Priestley's touring side in 1896–97, playing two minor matches at the Kensington Oval during the tour. He played five first-class matches during the tour, making two first-class appearances against Trinidad at Port-of-Spain, and three first-class appearances against Jamaica at Kingston. In his five first-class matches, he scored 78 runs with a high score of 36 not out, as well as taking one wicket. His brother, Greenidge, was also a first-class cricketer.

Elliott married Adah Isabella Cox in London in August 1895, when he gave his occupation as "Physician & Surgeon".
