= Harrison College (Barbados) =

Secondary school in Bridgetown, Barbados

Coordinates: 13.100109°N 59.610299°W

Information
- Motto: In Deo Fides (Trust In God)
- Established: 1733; 293 years ago
- Principal: Mrs. Kaylene Kellman-Holder
- Vice Principal: Dr. Martin Alleyne
- Campus: Bridgetown, Barbados

Harrison College is a co-educational grammar school (secondary school) in Bridgetown, Barbados. Founded in 1733, the school takes its name from Thomas Harrison, a Bridgetown merchant, who intended it to serve as "A Public and Free School for the poor and indigent boys of the parish".

Even in the nineteenth century it was recognised as perhaps the most prestigious secondary school in the British West Indies, attracting boys from neighbouring islands, including Pelham Warner who later went on to become the "Grand Old Man" of English cricket. Described as "The Eton College of Barbados", since Barbados' independence in 1966, five out of Barbados's eight Prime Ministers have been alumni of Harrison College, among whom are also numbered the national poet Kamau Brathwaite and Alan Emtage the co-inventor of Archie, the world's first Internet search engine.

The school is responsible for the production of at least 65% of all government scholars or exhibition winners since the government introduced these aids to help funding with tertiary education.

It was an all-boys school for most of its history, with girls admitted to the Sixth Form since at least 1970 and to the lower forms from September 1980. Since the 1960s, no fees have been charged to study at Harrison College, but entry is by a competitive national examination. Harrison College or "Kolij" as it is more affectionately known to its students and alumni has been a cornerstone of Barbadian education since its establishment in 1733.

== Location ==
The school is spread over several acres in Crumpton Street, at the heart of the country's capital, Bridgetown. The campus includes: an assembly hall; library; laboratories for music, art, physics, chemistry, and biology; two large playing fields in addition to basketball and tennis courts; headmaster's and treasurer's offices, faculty retreat and an outdoor firing range maintained by the school's cadet corps.

== Accreditation ==
Harrison College is one of 21 public secondary schools accredited by the Ministry of Education of Barbados. Entry to the school is governed by results of an examination taken in the last year of primary education, the Barbados Secondary Schools Entrance Examination. Traditionally the top 120 students (60 males and 60 females) in the examination are awarded admission into the school. However, after zoning was implemented in 1996, students may opt to go to other schools.

== Structure ==
The school's population is 1000 to 1,100 students. The junior school (forms 1–3) has around 360 students who take subjects which include English, French, Spanish, mathematics, physics, chemistry, biology, integrated science, geography, history, woodwork, metalwork, music, art, religious studies, technical drawing and physical education.

At the end of 2nd form, students are allowed to choose between keeping Religious Studies, Art, Music or Technical Drawing.

In the fourth year all students start a two-year course leading to the Caribbean Secondary Education Certificate (CSEC). Students are required to take English, mathematics, one science subject (physics, chemistry or biology), one language (either French or Spanish) and one social science (either history or geography). They are also given the choice of two other subjects chosen from among foreign languages, science, history or geography, art, technical drawing, principles of business, principles of accounts, and information technology. Students take at leat eight subjects.

Nearly all students continue their studies at sixth form level and entry is dependent on a satisfactory performance at the CSEC examination. There is a great flexibility of choice at sixth form level as a wide range of subjects is offered to suit a range of interests, university requirements and ability.

At the end of their upper sixth form year, students sit the Caribbean Advanced Proficiency Examination (CAPE). Harrison College has maintained a minimum 75% pass rate at CSEC and 70% at 'A' Level and CAPE. Since 1990, 150 students have attained Barbados scholarships and government awards.

== Faculty ==
The college has sixty-three faculty members, including part-time staff, fifty-three of whom have bachelor's degrees and ten of whom hold master's degrees.

== Calendar ==
The academic year has 37 weeks and is divided into three terms in the traditional model: Michaelmas Term, Hilary Term, and Trinity Term. Detailed reports of students are sent to parents at the end of each term. In addition, mid-term reports are sent to parents of students in forms 1–5.

== Careers ==
The great majority of students leaving Harrison College pursue some form of higher education, going to universities and colleges in the US, Canada, the United Kingdom, as well as the regional University of the West Indies. A guidance counsellor is on staff to advise students on the choice of careers.

== Evaluation ==
Grade point averages are not used. Instead, marks in individual subjects are reported by means of percentages and in forms 1–5 the student's rank in each subject is reported.

== Activities ==
The student population is divided into four houses for competitive academic and sporting events called "inter-house". The four Houses are "A" Armstrong- blue; "B" Deighton-red; "C" Collymore- green and "D" Dalton- yellow. The houses have strong traditions as relatives of past students are normally allocated to the same house their brothers, sisters, fathers or mothers were in.

Within the school grounds there are playing facilities for cricket, football, table tennis, volleyball, netball, basketball, hockey, rugby, and track and field. Competitive fixtures are arranged with local club teams as well as other teams.

Strong emphasis is placed on sports; the school has produced athletes who have represented the country at the national, regional and international levels. 2000 Olympics 100 m bronze medalist Obadele Thompson and 1998 Commonwealth Games and then 400 m hurdles champion Andrea Blackett are alumni of the school.

The school has won national school titles in sports that include cricket, football, volleyball, hockey, track and field, swimming, netball, rugby and tennis.

Music plays an important role in the life of the school. The Harrison College ensemble has given public performances at home and overseas.

The school has societies and clubs – the Computer and Information Technology Club, Chess Club, Photographic Club, Science Club, Key Club, Environmental Club, Girl Guides, Boy Scouts, Debating Society, Inter-School Christian Fellowship, an active Duke of Edinburgh Award Scheme and a table tennis club. There is a P.T.A and Alumni Association.

The #1 company of the Barbados Cadet Corps, formerly consisting of students from Harrison College and its sister school Queen's College, (now the #21 company) was the first company formed at the inception of the Corps over 100 years ago.

== Uniform ==
- Wearing uniform is compulsory at Harrison College. Junior boys wear khaki shorts and shirts with epaulettes in the school colours of maroon and gold. They also wear khaki knee high socks with brown laced dress shoes.
- Junior girls wear a mustard dress with a belt in the school colours (maroon and gold), white ankle high socks also with brown laced dress shoes.
- Senior boys are required to wear white buttoned down, short sleeved shirts and grey slacks and senior girls wear white buttoned down short sleeve shirts and grey A-Line skirts. Seniors may wear either epaulettes or a school tie in the school colours of maroon and gold. Shoes for seniors are black laced dress shoes. Males must wear dark coloured socks, females white ankle high socks.
- On special occasions, navy blue blazers bearing the school crest and motto "In Deo Fides" (Trust in God) may be worn by the senior school students.
- Additionally, there are two ties that can be acquired by the students. Students earn these ties for athletic achievement (called Colours) and one for making a substantial contribution to a club (extracurricular activity).

== Notable alumni ==
- Sir Grantley Herbert Adams – former Premier and Prime Minister of West Indies Federation
- John Michael Geoffrey Manningham Adams – former Prime Minister
- Owen Arthur – former Prime Minister
- Errol Walton Barrow – former Premier and first Prime Minister of Barbados, decorated WWII RAF Flying Officer
- Alfred Pakenham Berkeley – former Bishop of Barbados
- Jacob Bethell – international cricketer for England
- Andrea Blackett – athlete, Commonwealth Games gold medalist
- Dr Henry Edmund Gaskin Boyle (1875–1941), British anaesthetist, inventor of the Boyle's Machine
- Ian Bradshaw – cricketer
- Robin Bynoe – Test cricketer
- Marsha K. Caddle - politician and economist
- Austin Clarke - Writer
- Rupert "Rupee" Clarke – entertainer
- Dr Richard Drayton – historian, Rhodes Professor of Imperial History, King's College London
- Gilbert Elliott (1870–unknown), first-class cricketer
- Greenidge Elliott (1861–1895), first-class cricketer
- Alan Emtage – computer scientist - inventor of Archie, the world's first search engine
- Dr Abel Hendy Jones Greenidge – Writer and lecturer Ancient History, Balliol, Brasenose and Hertford Colleges, Oxford
- Charles Wilton Wood Greenidge – former Judge of Court Appeal Barbados, Solicitor General and Attorney General Trinidad, Chief Justice of British Honduras and Solicitor General of Nigeria
- Adrian Griffith – former Barbados and West Indies opening batsman
- Jason Haynes (cricketer) – Barbados Senior Cricket Captain, 2008
- David Holford – Test cricketer
- Anthony Howard- Test cricketer, West Indies Team manager & Former Director of Cricket WICB
- Sir Clifford Husbands – former Governor-General
- Shontelle Layne – singer, songwriter
- Sir Roy Marshall - former Vice Chancellor of the University of the West Indies and the University of Hull, former High Commissioner from Barbados to the United Kingdom
- Hayley Matthews – captain of West Indies women's cricket team
- George Moe – former Attorney General of Barbados and Chief Justice of Belize
- Carlie Pipe – long-distance runner and national record holder in the half marathon
- Lloyd Erskine Sandiford – former Prime Minister
- Sir Arleigh Winston Scott – former Governor-General and first native Barbadian to hold that office
- M. P. Shiel – novelist
- Cammie Smith – Test cricketer
- Sir Hugh Springer – former Governor-General
- Sir Harold Bernard St. John – former Prime Minister
- Obadele Thompson – Track and field athlete, Olympic bronze medalist
- Sir Clyde Walcott – Test cricketer
- Sir Deighton Lisle Ward – former Governor-General
- Sir Pelham Warner "Plum Warner" – the Grand Old Man of English cricket
- Henry Wilcoxon – actor
- Sir Denys Williams – former Chief Justice of Barbados
- Rev. Guy Hewitt - former High Commissioner from Barbados to the United Kingdom

== See also ==
- Queen's College (Barbados)
- List of schools in Barbados
- Education in Barbados
