= Government of Barbados =

National government

- Parliamentary Republic
- Coat of arms of Barbados
- Formation: 30 November 1966; 59 years ago
- Founding document: Constitution of Barbados
- Country: Barbados
- Website: www.gov.bb

Office of the President
- Head of State: President of Barbados
- Seat: State House

Legislative branch
- Legislature: Parliament: House of Assembly; Senate
- Meeting place: Parliament Buildings

Executive branch
- Head of Government: Prime Minister of Barbados
- Appointed by: President of Barbados
- Headquarters: Ilaro Court
- Main organ: Cabinet of Barbados
- Departments: 19 Ministries

Judicial branch
- Court: Supreme Court of Barbados
- Seat: Supreme Court of Barbados Complex

The Government of Barbados is a unitary parliamentary republic, where the President is the head of state and the Prime Minister is the head of government.

== Structure ==
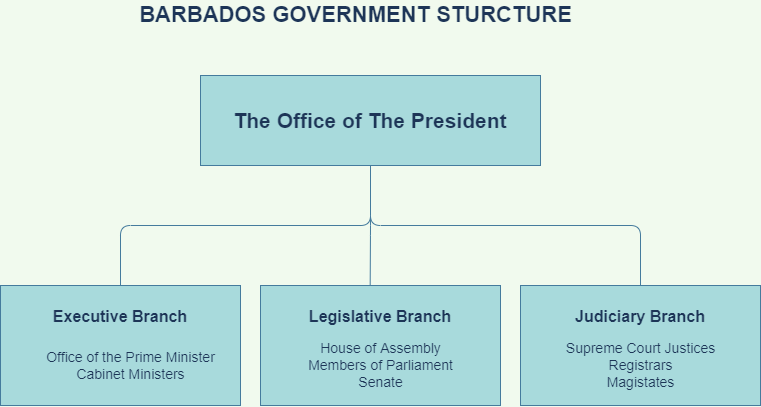
Simplification of the government structure of Barbados

The country has a bicameral legislature and a political party system, based on universal adult suffrage and fair elections. The Senate has 21 members, appointed by the President, 12 on the advice of the Prime Minister, two on the advice of the Leader of the Opposition, and seven at the President's discretion. The House of Assembly has 30 members, all elected. Both houses debate all legislation. However, the House of Assembly may override the Senate's rejection of bills, except those amending the Constitution.

Officers of each house (President and Deputy President of the Senate; Speaker, Deputy Speaker, and Chairman of Committees of the Assembly) are elected from the members of the respective houses.

In keeping with the Westminster system of governance, Barbados has evolved into an independent parliamentary democracy, meaning that all political power rests with Parliament under a non-political President as head of state. Executive authority is vested in the President, who normally acts only on the advice of the Prime Minister and Cabinet, who are collectively responsible to Parliament. Barbadian law is rooted in English common law, and the Constitution of Barbados, implemented in 1966, is the supreme law of the land.

Fundamental rights and freedoms of the individual are set out in the Constitution and are protected by a strict legal code.

The Cabinet is headed by the Prime Minister, who must be an elected member of Parliament. Other ministers are appointed from either chamber by the President, as advised by the Prime Minister.

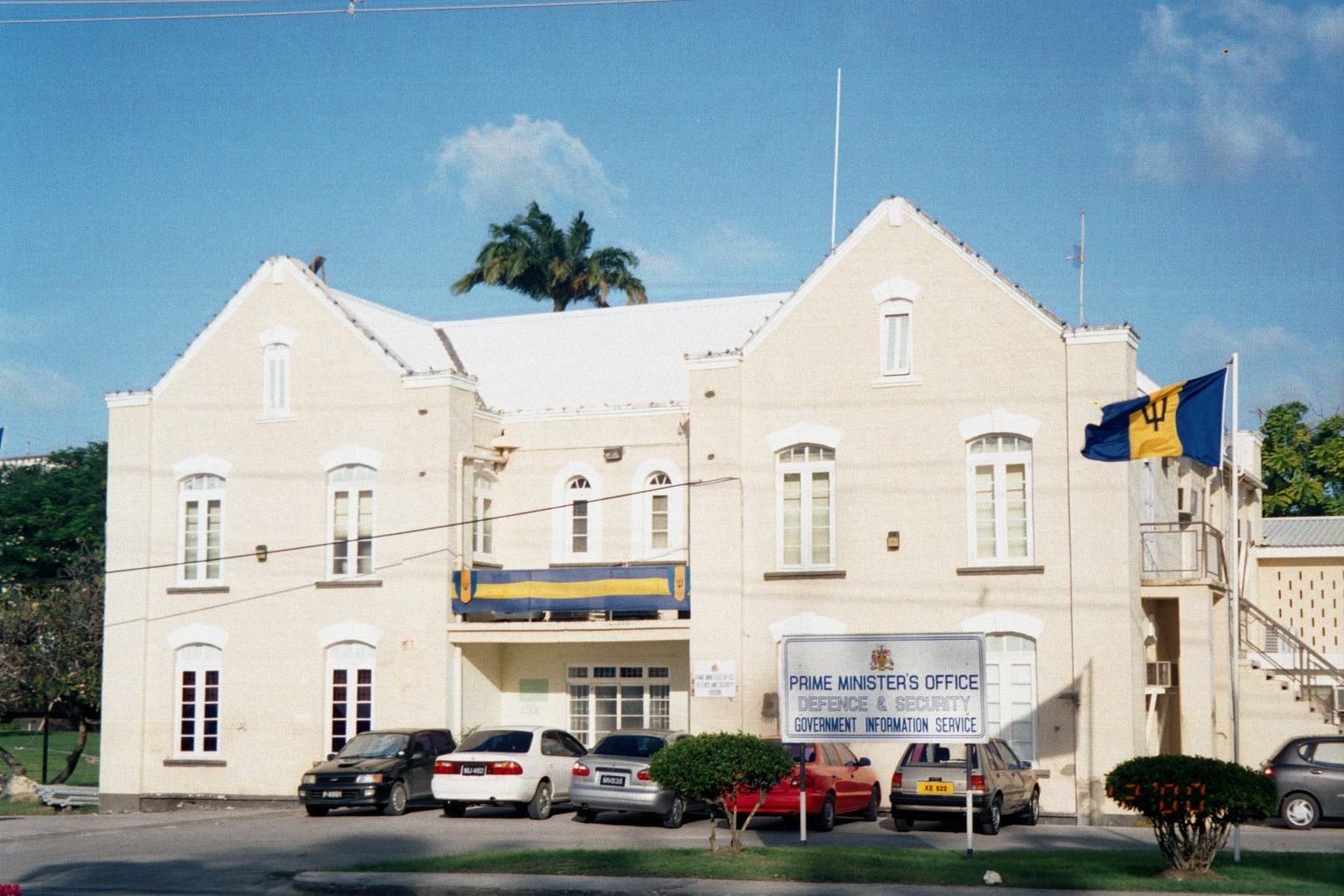
Office of the Prime Minister of Barbados on Bay Street, Bridgetown, Barbados. (c.a. November 2000)

The President appoints as Leader of the Opposition the member of the House of Assembly who commands the support of the largest number of members of that House in opposition to the ruling party's government.

The maximum duration of a Parliament is five years from the first sitting. There is a simultaneous dissolution of both Houses of Parliament by the President, acting on the advice of the Prime Minister.

There is an established non-political civil service. Also, there are separate constitutional commissions for the Judicial and Legal Service, the Public Service, and the Police Service.

== History ==
The government has been chosen by elections since 1961 elections, when Barbados achieved full self-governance. Before then, the government was a Crown colony consisting of either colonial administration solely (such as the Executive Council), or a mixture of colonial rule and a partially elected assembly, such as the Legislative Council.

Between 1966 and 2021, the head of state of Barbados was the Monarchy of Barbados, represented by the Governor-General of Barbados. After decades of republicanism, the monarchy was abolished and replaced with a new head of state office, the President of Barbados, on 30 November 2021.

Since independence, the Democratic Labour Party (DLP) has held office 1966 to 1976, from 1986 to 1994, and from January 2008 to 2018. The Barbados Labour Party (BLP) has governed from 1976 to 1986, from September 1994–2008 and from 2018 to the present day.

== Executive branch ==
Main office-holders
Office	Name	Party	Since
President	Jeffrey Bostic		30 November 2025
Prime Minister	Mia Mottley	Barbados Labour Party	25 May 2018

The Executive Branch of government conducts the ordinary business of government. These functions are called out by the Prime Minister and cabinet ministers. The Prime Minister chooses the ministers of government they wish to have in the cabinet but they are actually appointed by the President.

- Heads of State
  - President
- Head of Government
  - Prime Minister
  - Attorney Generals
  - Ministers

Office	Office Holder	Constituency	Political Party
Prime Minister; Minister of Finance and Economic Affairs, with responsibility for Culture, Security, Public Service, Caricom and Development Commissions	Mia Mottley	St. Michael North East	Barbados Labour Party
Deputy Prime Minister; Senior Minister; Minister of Transport, Works and Water Resources	Sanita Bradshaw	St. Michael South East	Barbados Labour Party
Attorney General and Minister of Legal Affairs; Senior Minister Governance	Dale Marshall	St. Joseph	Barbados Labour Party
Minister of Energy and Business Development; Senior Minister	Kerrie Symmonds	St. James Central	Barbados Labour Party
Minister of Foreign Affairs and Foreign Trade; Senior Minister, Social and Environmental Policy	Jerome Walcott	N/A (Senator)	Barbados Labour Party
Senior Minister in the Prime Minister's Office, with responsibility for Infrastructure and Town Planning Matters	William Duguid	Christ Church West	Barbados Labour Party
Minister of Homes Affairs and Information	Wilfred Abrahams	Christ Church East	Barbados Labour Party
Minister of Agriculture, Food and Nutrition Security	Indar Weir	St. Philip South	Barbados Labour Party
Minister of Tourism and International Transport	Ian Gooding Edghill	St. Michael West Central	Barbados Labour Party
Minister for the Public Service, Home Affairs, Labour and Gender Affairs	Lisa Cummings	N/A (Senator)	Barbados Labour Party
Minister of Education, Technological and Vocational Training	Kay McConney	St. Philip West	Barbados Labour Party
Minister of Housing, lands and Maintenance	Dwight Sutherland	St. George South	Barbados Labour Party
Minister of People Empowerment and Elder Affairs	Kirk Humphrey	St. Michael South	Barbados Labour Party
Minister of the Environment and National Beautification and Blue Economy	Adrian Forde	Christ Church West Central	Barbados Labour Party
Minister of Labour, Social Security and Third Sector	Colin Jordan	St. Peter	Barbados Labour Party
Minister of Industry, Innovation, Science and Technology	Davidson Ishmael	St. Michael North	Barbados Labour Party
Minister of Youth, Sports and Community Empowerment	Charles Griffith	St. John	Barbados Labour Party
Minister in the Ministry of Finance and Economic Development	Ryan Straughn	Christ Church East Central	Barbados Labour Party
Minister in the Office of the Prime Minister	Chantal Munroe Knight	N/A (Senator)	Barbados Labour Party
Minister of State in the Ministry of Health and Wellness	Sonia Browne	St. Philip North	Barbados Labour Party
Minister of State in the Ministry of Foreign Trade and Ministry of Business Development	Sandra Husbands	St. James South	Barbados Labour Party

Source: St.Lucia Times

Parliamentary Secretaries
Office	Office Holder	Constituency	Political party
Parliamentary Secretary in the Ministry of Transport, Works and Water Resources, with responsibility for Water Resources	Rommel Springer	St. Andrew	Barbados Labour Party
Parliamentary Secretary in the Ministry of People Empowerment and Elder Affairs	Corey Layne	City of Bridgetown	Barbados Labour Party

Source: St.Lucia Times

Permanent Secretaries
Ministerial Office	Position	Office Holder
Ministry of Foreign Affairs and Foreign Trade	Head of the Public Service, Director-General of Foreign Trade	Louis Woodroffe
Prime Minister's Office	Permanent Secretary	Alies Jordan
Ministry of the Public Service	Director General (Human Resources)	Gail Atkins
Ministry of Finance, Economic Affairs and Investment	Permanent Secretary	Nancy Headley
Ministry of Foreign Affairs and Foreign Trade	Permanent Secretary	Simone Rudder
Office of the Attorney General and Ministry of Legal Affairs	Permanent Secretary	Yvette Goddard
Ministry of Education, Technological and Vocational Training	Permanent Secretary	Betty Alleyne Headley
Ministry of Home Affairs	Permanent Secretary	Deborah Payne
Ministry of Health and Wellness	Permanent Secretary	Janet Philips
Ministry of Agriculture and Food Security	Permanent Secretary	Terry Bascombe
Ministry of Labour and Social Partnership Relations	Permanent Secretary	Dr. Karen Best
Ministry of Housing, Lands and Rural Development	Permanent Secretary	Timothy Maynard
Ministry of International Business and Industry	Permanent Secretary	June Chandler
National Insurance Department	DIRECTOR	Jennifer Hunte
Ministry of Tourism and International Transport	Permanent Secretary	Donna Cadogan
Ministry of Youth and Community Empowerment	Permanent Secretary	Yolande Howard
Ministry of People Empowerment and Elder Affairs	Permanent Secretary	Gabrielle Springer
Ministry of Energy, Small Business and Entrepreneurship	Permanent Secretary (Special Assignments)	Andrew Gittens
Ministry of Environment and National Beautification	Permanent Secretary	Daphne Kellman
Ministry of Energy, Small Business and Entrepreneurship	Permanent Secretary (Small Business and Entrepreneurship)	Francine Blackman
Ministry of Transport, Works and Maintenance	Permanent Secretary	Mark Cummins
Prime Minister's Office	Permanent Secretary (Culture)	Jehu Wiltshire
Ministry of Maritime Affairs and the Blue Economy	Permanent Secretary	Sonia Foster
Ministry of Innovation, Science and Smart Technology	Permanent Secretary	Charley Browne
Ministry of Information, Broadcasting and Public Affairs	Permanent Secretary	Sandra Phillips
Cabinet Office	Cabinet Secretary	Cecile Humphrey
Ministry of Energy, Small Business and Entrepreneurship	Permanent Secretary (Small Business and Entrepreneurship)	Esworth Reid

Source: BGIS

== Legislative branch ==
Under Barbados' version of the Westminster system of government, the executive and legislative branches are partly intertwined. The only official Cabinet office (other than Prime Minister) expressly mentioned in the country's constitution is the Office of the Attorney-General.

- President
- Chief Secretaries (abolished)
- Auditors-General
- Senators
  - Presidents of the Senate
- Members of the House (also known as Members of Parliament)
  - Speakers of the House of Assembly
- Clerks of Parliament

=== Law ===
The Constitution of Barbados is the supreme law of the nation. The Attorney General heads the independent judiciary. Historically, Barbadian law was based entirely on English common law with a few local adaptations. At the time of independence, the Parliament of the United Kingdom lost its ability to legislate for Barbados, but the existing English and British common law and statutes in force at that time, together with other measures already adopted by the Barbadian Parliament, became the basis of the new country's legal system.

Legislation may be shaped or influenced by the United Nations, the Organization of American States, or other international bodies to which Barbados has obligatory commitments by treaty. Additionally, through international co-operation, other institutions may supply Parliament with key sample legislation to be adapted to meet local circumstances before enacting it as local law.

New acts are passed by Parliament and require approval by the President to become law. The President has the power to "withhold assent" from laws by vetoing the proposed law without parliamentary override.

== Judicial branch ==
The judiciary is the legal system through which punishments are handed out to individuals who break the law. The functions of the judiciary are to enforce laws, to interpret laws, to conduct court hearings, and to hear court appeals.

The local court system of Barbados is made up of:

- Magistrates' Courts: covering criminal, civil, domestic, domestic violence, and juvenile matters. Magistrates can also take up matters dealing with coroner's inquests, liquor licences, and civil marriages. They also deal with contract and tort law where claims do not exceed $10,000.
- Supreme Court: made up of the High Court and the Court of Appeals.
  - High Court: consisting of civil, criminal, and family law divisions.
  - Court of Appeal: handles appeals from the High Court and Magistrates' Courts. It hears appeals in both the civil and criminal law jurisdictions. It may consist of a single Justice of Appeal sitting in Chambers; or may sit as a Full Court of three Justices of Appeals.
- Caribbean Court of Justice (CCJ): based in Port of Spain, Trinidad and Tobago, the CCJ is the court of last resort (final jurisdiction) over Barbadian law. It replaced the London-based Judicial Committee of the Privy Council. The CCJ may resolve other disputed matters dealing with the Caribbean Single Market and Economy.
- Chief Justices
  - Justices of Appeals
  - Magistrates

== Perception ==
Transparency International ranked Barbados as 23rd place (of 180) in the world on its Corruption Perceptions Index in 2024, being the least corrupt country in the Caribbean.

== See also ==
- Politics of Barbados
- Monarchy of Barbados
- Parliament of Barbados
- Prime Minister of Barbados
- Cabinet of Barbados
- List of government budgets by country
- List of countries by tax revenue as percentage of GDP

== Gallery ==
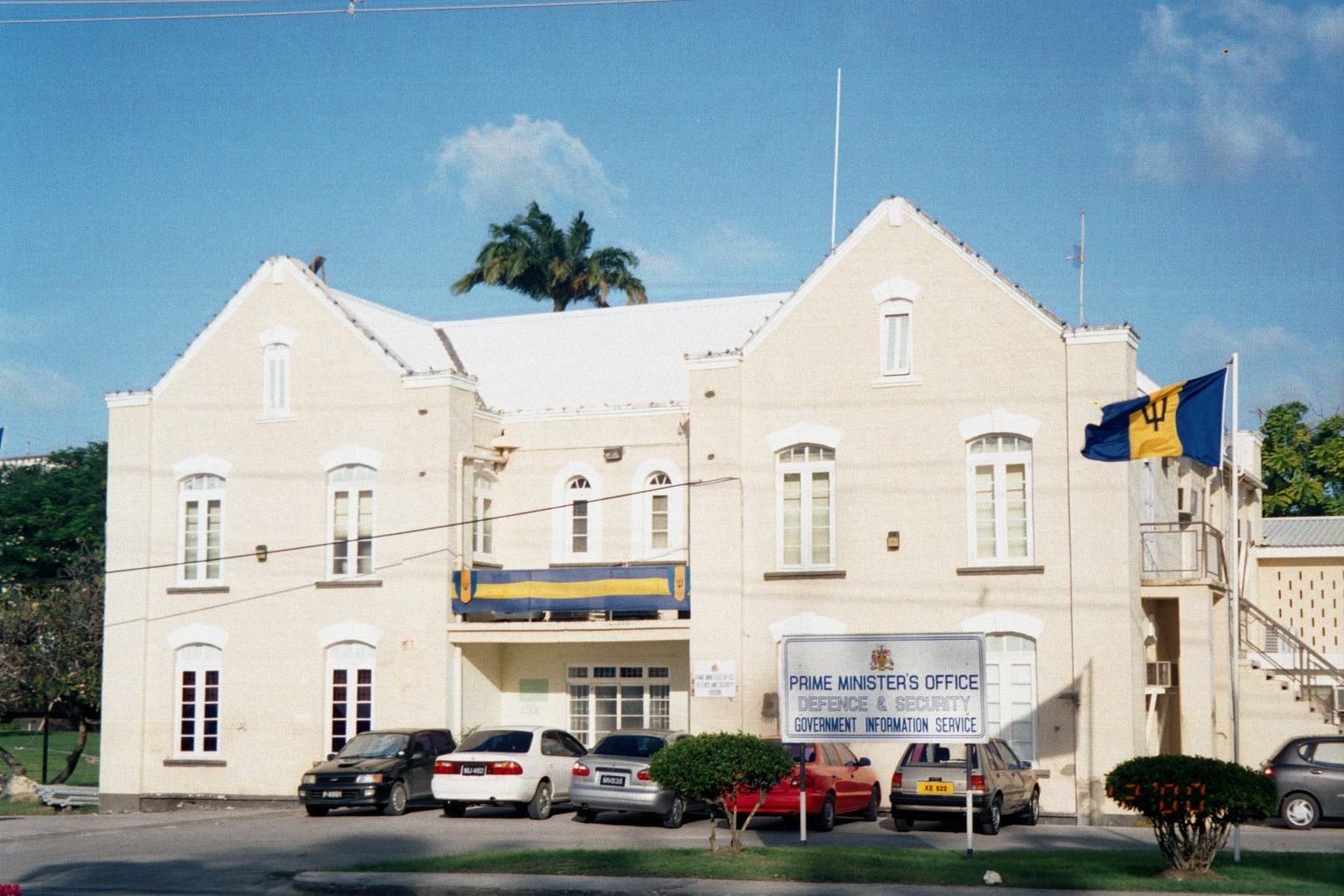
Office of the Prime Minister

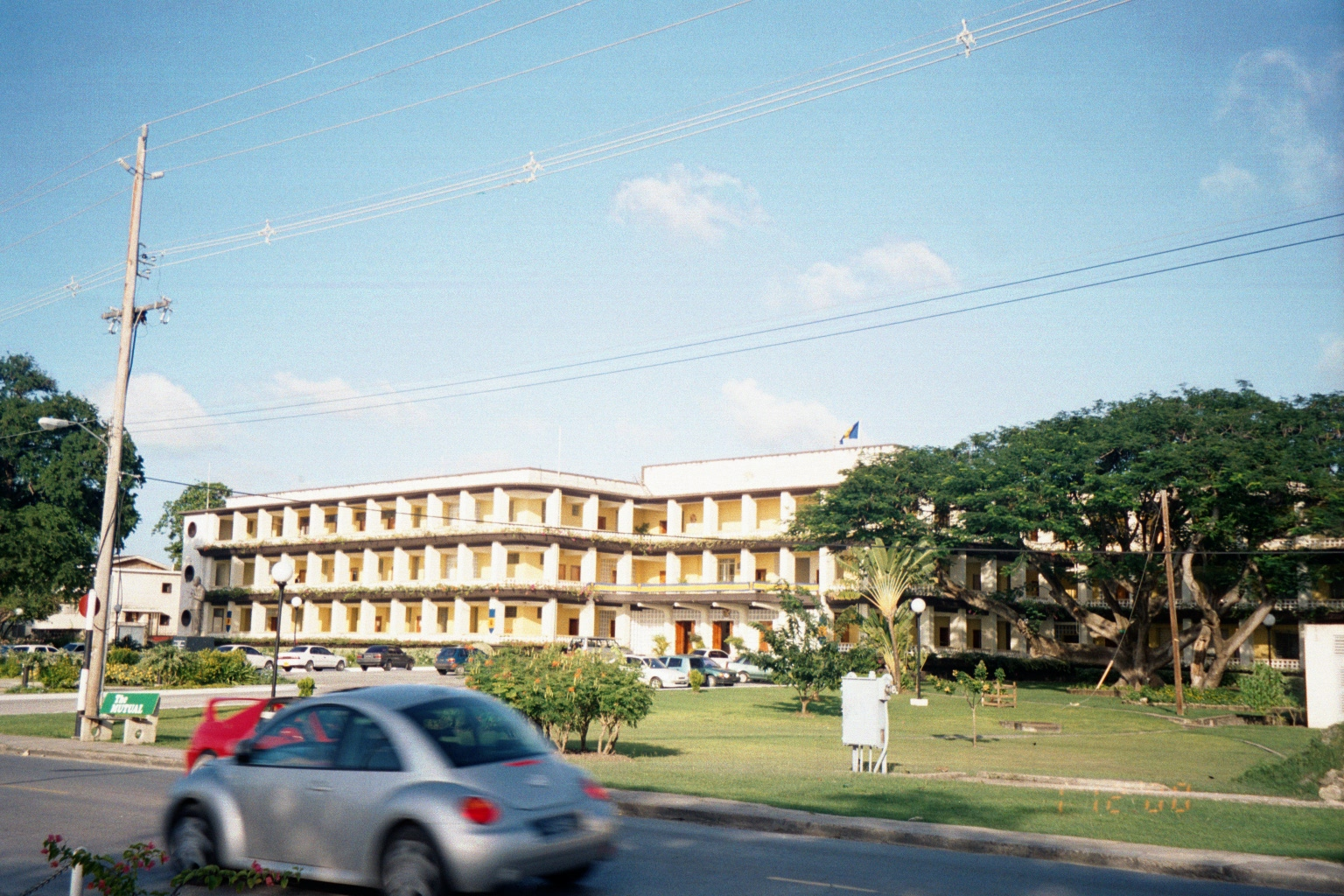
The Cabinet Office in the Government Headquarters complex

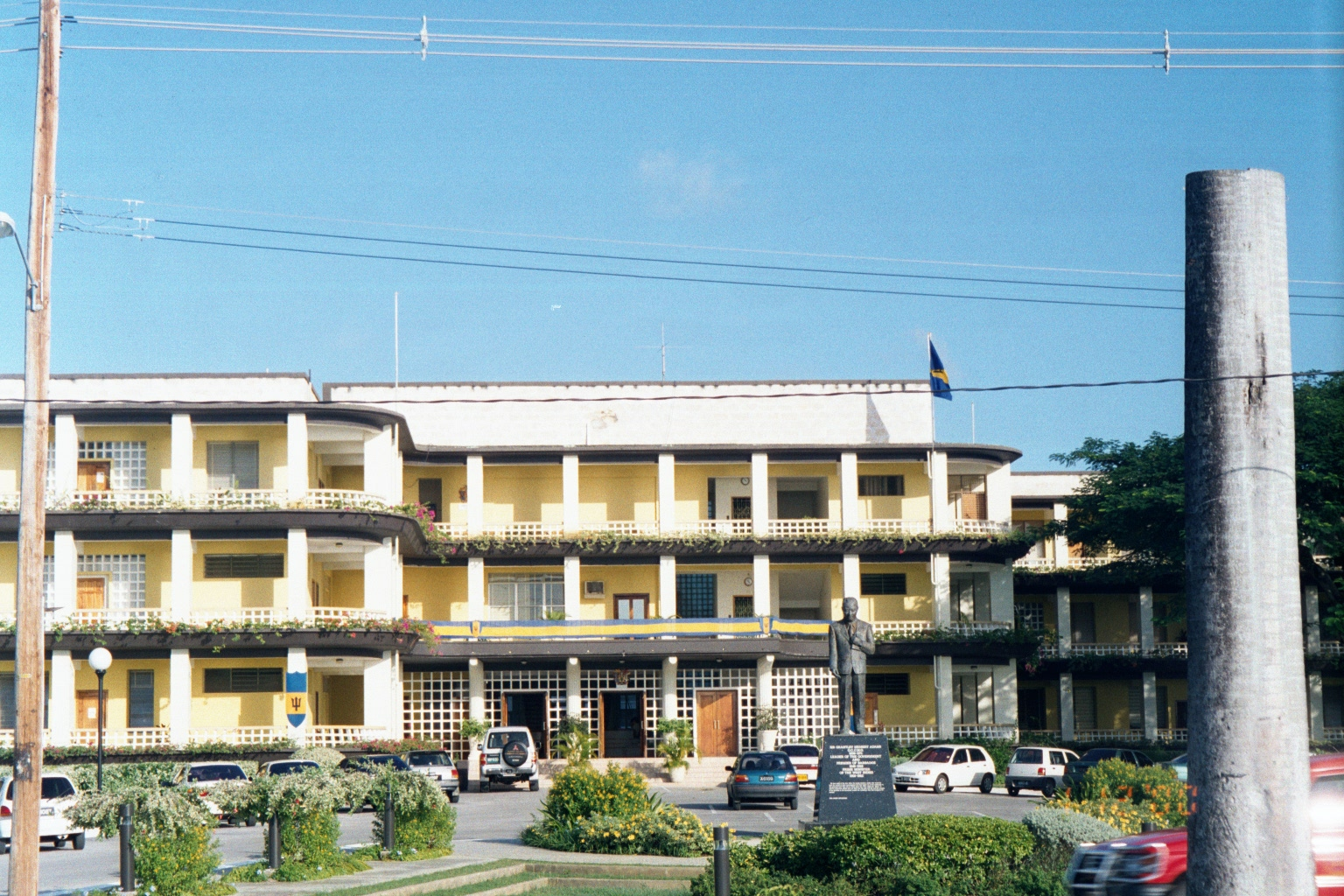
Main entrance to the Government Headquarters complex, with a statue of Sir Grantley Adams in the foreground
