= Nita Barrow =

Governor-General of Barbados

Her Excellency Dame Nita Barrow GCMG DA

5th Governor-General of Barbados
- In office 6 June 1990 – 19 December 1995
- Monarch: Elizabeth II
- Prime Minister: Lloyd Erskine Sandiford; Owen Arthur
- Preceded by: Hugh Springer
- Succeeded by: Clifford Husbands

Personal details
- Born: 15 November 1916 Saint Lucy, Barbados
- Died: 19 December 1995 (aged 79) Bridgetown, Barbados
- Education: University of Toronto

Dame Ruth Nita Barrow (15 November 1916 – 19 December 1995) was the first female governor-general of Barbados. Barrow was a nurse and a public health servant from Barbados. She served as the fifth governor-general of Barbados from 6 June 1990 until her death on 19 December 1995. She was the older sister of Errol Barrow, the first prime minister of Barbados.

== Early life ==
Ruth Nita Barrow was born in Barbados to a respected Anglican priest, the Reverend Reginald Grant Barrow, and Mrs. Ruth Alberta Barrow (née O'Neal). She was the second of her parents' five children, whom included Sybil Barrow, Ena Comma, and Errol Barrow. She trained as a nurse, midwife and health care administrator. She held a variety of nursing, public health and public administration jobs in Barbados and Jamaica in the 1940s/1950s.

== Education ==
She began her nursing profession in her early years following in the steps of her uncle and father, and completed her basic training at the Barbados General Hospital. She then began training in midwifery at the Port of Spain General Hospital in Trinidad.

Barrow was a graduate in nursing from Columbia University (New York), University of Toronto, (Canada), and the University of Edinburgh (Scotland). She later continued her education in a specialized study at the Royal College of Nursing of Edinburgh University in 1951-52, and at Columbia University in 1962-63.

As a public servant, she served as an Instructress at the West Indies School of Public Health in Jamaica in 1945 to 1950. She later became responsible in the Nursing and Public Health fields as the first West Indian Matron of the University College Hospital in 1954 and the first Principal Nursing Officer in Jamaica in 1956.

Following the regional expansion of the West Indies School, she became a director of a nursing research project in the Commonwealth Caribbean. This led to modernizing nurses training and began the Advanced Nursing program at the University of the West Indies.

== Career ==
Barrow's career began in 1964, when she became a Nursing Advisor for the Pan American Health Organization for the Caribbean area. In 1975, she became the Director of the Christian Medical Commission of the World Council of Churches (WCC) and President of the World YWCA (1975–1983). She was president of the International Council for Adult Education (ICAE) from 1982 through 1990 and Convenor of the Non-Governmental Organization (NGO) Forum for the Decade of Women in Nairobi, Kenya in 1983. In 1985, at the Nairobi World Conference on Women, Barrow served as the chair of the NGO Forum.

She was a member of the Commonwealth Group of Eminent Persons that visited South Africa in 1986. During that mission she successfully thwarted South Africa's military restrictions, through entering the restricted area of Alexandra township disguised in African garb and head-dress.

Barrow was conferred the highest honor in Barbados; she was made a Dame of St. Andrew (DA) of the Order of Barbados in 1980. In 1990, she was appointed Dame Grand Cross of the Order of St Michael and St George (GCMG). She was also awarded an Honorary Fellowship of the Royal College of Nursing (FRCN).

Barrow suffered from a stroke the night of her death. She was survived by her sisters, Sybil Barrow and Ena Comma.

== Legacy ==
The Errol & Nita Barrow Educational Trust raises funds and make financial awards to enable Bajans and Commonwealth Caribbean citizens to pursue a course of study that will further the development of Barbados and the Caribbean.

The ICAE created the Dame Nita Barrow award which supports regional and nation adult education organizations that have made a great contribution towards the empowerment of women.

Die Nita Barrow Collection, a collection of documents about Nita Barrow's life and times, has been inscribed into UNESCO's list on world documentary heritage, the Memory of the World Register.

== Positions ==
- Nursing and Public Health positions in Barbados and Jamaica (1940–1956)
- Chief Nursing Officer, Jamaica (1956–1967)
- Public health advisor to the World Health Organization and the Pan-American Health Organization (1963–75)
- Nursing Advisor, Pan America Health Organization (1967–1971)
- Associate Director, Christian Medical commission of World Council of Churches, Geneva (1971–1975)
- President of the World YWCA (1975–83)
- Director/Health Consultant, World Health Organization (1981–1986)
- President of the International Council for Adult Education (1982–90)
- President of the World Council of Churches (1983)
- Ambassador to the United Nations (1986–90)
- Honorary Fellow, Royal College of Nursing
- Governor General of Barbados (1990–1995)

== Honors and awards ==
- 1975 Doctor of Laws, University of the West Indies
- 1980 honorary Fellow of the Royal College of Nursing
- 1980 Dame of St. Andrew, by Order of Her Majesty Queen Elizabeth II
- 1982 Doctor of Science, McMaster University, Canada
- 1983 Gamaliel Chair Lecturer, University of Wisconsin–Milwaukee, USA
- 1984 Spirit of Caribbean Award, Caribbean Resources Foundation
- 1985 West Indian of the Year, Bajan Magazine
- 1986 Caribbean Prize for Peace through the Struggle for Justice, Caribbean Council of Churches
- 1986 Outstanding Citizen of the Year Award, Kiwanis Club of Barbados
- 1987 CARICOM Women's Award
- 1987 Doctor of Laws, University of Toronto, Canada
- 1987 Doctor of Human Letters, Morris Brown University, USA
- 1988 Doctor of Humanities, Mount St. Vincent University, Canada
- 1988 Doctor of Laws, University of Winnipeg, Canada
- 1988 Presidential Medal, Brooklyn College, USA
- 1988 Honorable Doctor of Laws, Spelman College, USA
- 1989 The Christiane Reimann Prize, International Council of Nurses, Geneva, Switzerland
- Honorary Doctor of Law, Queen's University, Canada
- Honorary Doctor of Literature, Wilfrid Laurier University

== See also ==
- Memory of the World Register – Latin America and the Caribbean
- List of the first female holders of political offices in the Americas

== Sources ==
1. Blackman, Francis Woodie. Dame Nita: Caribbean Woman, World Citizen. Kingston, Jamaica: Ian Randle Publishers, 1985.

Government offices
Preceded by Hugh Springer	Governor-General of Barbados; 1990–1995	Succeeded by Denys Williams; Acting
