= Privy Council of Barbados =

The Privy Council of Barbados is a formal body of advisors to the head of state (the sovereign represented viceregally by the Governor-General of Barbados) prior to 30 November 2021 and the President of Barbados as of 30 November 2021) and is provided for in the 1966 Constitution of Barbados, which reads:

76. 1. There shall be a Privy Council for Barbados which shall consist of such person as the Governor General, after consultation with the Prime Minister, may appoint by instrument under the Public Seal.

2. The Privy Council shall have such powers and duties as may be conferred or imposed upon it by this Constitution or any other law.

3. The office of a member of the Privy Council appointed under this section shall become vacant -

a. at the expiration of fifteen years from the date of his appointment or such shorter period as may be specified in the instrument by which he was appointed;

b. when he attains the age of seventy-five years; or

c. if his appointment is revoked by the Governor General, acting after consultation with the Prime Minister, by instrument under the Public Seal.

77. 1. The Privy Council shall not be summoned except by the authority of the Governor General acting in his discretion.

2. The Governor General shall, so far as is practicable, attend and preside at all meetings of the Privy Council.

3. Subject to the provisions of this Constitution, the Privy Council may regulate its own procedure.

4. The question whether the Privy Council has validly performed any function vested in it by this Constitution shall not be inquired into in any court.

Since 30 November 2021, references to the Governor-General of Barbados has been replaced with references to the President of Barbados.

== Composition ==
The Privy Council is appointed by the President of Barbados after consultation with the Prime Minister. It consists of 12 members, with the President as chairman.

It formerly advised the Governor-General of Barbados in the exercise of the royal prerogative of mercy and in the exercise of his or her disciplinary powers over members of the public and police services until the declaration of the Republic of Barbados on 30 November 2021.

== History ==
=== Barbados early governance ===
The early Barbadian Legislature was composed of a Governor (who was at times also Governor-in-chief of other British West Indies colonial islands including the Windward islands) has an Executive Council consisting of the Governor, Major-General, Colonial Secretary, and Attorney-General, a Legislative Council in which the senior officer commanding the troops, the Colonial Secretary, and the Attorney-General sit ex officio, and a House of Assembly of twenty-four members, elected annually by franchise. The first Governor of Barbados was Henry Powell from 17 February 1627.

The first Council was formed in 1657 under King Charles II and managed by his Governor and the first Privy Council head was Sir Peter Colleton (1673–1674, acting). The first Member of Her Majesty's Council of Barbados in 1657 was William Sharpe.

=== Modern privy council ===
In 1965 it was recorded that "There shall be a Privy Council for Barbados which shall consist of such persons as the Governor-General, after consultation with the Prime Minister, may appoint by instrument under the Public Seal".

== See also ==
- List of colonial secretaries of Barbados
- List of governors of Barbados
- List of presidents of the Legislative Council of Barbados
- Judiciary of Barbados and Judicial Committee of the Privy Council in the Caribbean Community.
