= Greenidge Elliott =

Barbadian cricketer (1861–1895)

Personal information
- Born: 21 October 1861; Saint Michael, Barbados
- Died: 8 December 1895 (aged 34); Addah, Gold Coast Colony (now Ghana)
- Source: Cricinfo, 13 November 2020

Greenidge Elliott (21 October 1861 – 8 December 1895) was a Barbadian cricketer. He played in one first-class match for the Barbados cricket team in 1883/84.

== See also ==
- List of Barbadian representative cricketers
