= Arleigh Winston Scott =

Sir Arleigh Winston Scott GCMG GCVO

2nd Governor-General of Barbados
- In office 18 May 1967 – 9 August 1976
- Monarch: Elizabeth II
- Prime Minister: Errol Barrow; Tom Adams
- Preceded by: John Montague Stow
- Succeeded by: Deighton Lisle Ward

Personal details
- Born: 27 March 1900 My Lord’s Hill, St. Michael, Colony of Barbados
- Died: 9 August 1976 (aged 76) Government House, St. Michael, Barbados
- Education: Howard University; University of Edinburgh

Sir Arleigh Winston Scott GCMG GCVO (27 March 1900 – 9 August 1976) was the second governor-general of Barbados between 18 May 1967 and 9 August 1976.

== Biography ==
The first native Governor-General of Barbados, Scott was educated at St. Giles Boys' School and Harrison College. He studied medicine at Howard University in the United States and later the University of Edinburgh in Scotland. After qualifying, he returned to the United States for further studies and became a visiting ophthalmic surgeon to Harlem Hospital in New York City.

He returned to Barbados in 1953, and became successful and highly regarded as a medical practitioner. He established a nursing home, which is known as Woodside Memorial Clinic, and which he continued to run until he became Governor-General. He had a distinguished record in community work and gave his services without charge to the Children's Goodwill League, as well as lecturing in public health. From time to time he taught hygiene to the pupils of some of the primary schools in the Bridgetown area.

Dr. Scott served in the Barbados Senate from 1964 to 1967, and in 1966 was appointed to the Privy Council of Barbados. In May 1967, on the retirement of John Stow (the last colonial Governor of Barbados), Dr. Scott was appointed Governor-General by the Queen on the recommendation of the Prime Minister. In the same year he was knighted and became known as Sir Winston Scott.

He was a member of Phi Beta Sigma fraternity.

He died suddenly while in office.
