= Order of Barbados =

Awarded by Government of Barbados
- Type: National Honour
- Established: 25 July 1980
- Eligibility: Citizens of Barbados.
- Awarded for: Service to Barbados.
- Status: Currently constituted
- Chancellor: President of Barbados

Precedence
- Next (higher): Order of National Heroes
- Next (lower): Various awards
- Ribbon of the order (1980 to 2021)

The Order of Barbados is a national Order of honours and decorations for Barbados.

== History ==
The first Order of Barbados was instituted by Queen Elizabeth II by letters patent dated 25 July 1980. In 2019, the Parliament of Barbados passed an Act amending the Order of Barbados to include the newly created Order of Freedom of Barbados. This new order was designed to be the highest honour Barbados could offer, in order to replace the traditional Knights and Dames of St Andrew. However, the act provided that the recipient would still be able to choose between receiving the new Order of Freedom or the traditional knighthood.

With Barbados becoming a republic on 30 November 2021, a new Order of Barbados came into force that was established with the Barbados National Honors and Decorations Act 2021 by the Parliament of Barbados on 28 October 2021, and which replaced the former Order of Barbados that existed under the monarchy.

== Order of Barbados (2021–present) ==
The Order under the Republic of Barbados consists of the following honours and decorations:

Honours and decorations of the Order of Barbados
Award	Grade	Post-nominal letters	Style
Order of Freedom of Barbados	Member	FB	The Most Honourable
Order of the Republic	Member	OR	The Honourable
Gold Award of Achievement	—	GA	—
Trident of Excellence	Gold Trident of Excellence	GTE	—
Trident of Excellence	Silver Trident of Excellence	STE	—
Barbados Service Award	Barbados Service Star	BSS	—
Barbados Service Award	Barbados Service Medal	BSM	—
Barbados Services Medal of Honour	—	—	—
Barbados Humanitarian Service Award	—	—	—
Award of Pride of Barbados	—	—	—
Prime Minister’s Award for Leadership	—	—	—

== Order of Barbados (1980–2021) ==
The Order while Barbados was still a Commonwealth realm (1966–2021) consisted of four classes of members, two of which were subdivided into two grades. There was a limit as to how many appointments could be made to each grade each year.

Grades of the Order of Barbados
Class	Grade	Post-nominal letters	Style
Knight or Dame of St. Andrew	—	KA/DA	Sir or Dame
Companion of Honour of Barbados	—	CHB	The Honourable
Crown of Merit	Gold Crown of Merit	GCM	—
Crown of Merit	Silver Crown of Merit	SCM	—
Barbados Service Award	Barbados Service Star	BSS	—
Barbados Service Award	Barbados Service Medal	BSM	—

When the Order of the Commonwealth realm of Barbados became obsolete, no further appointments were made with this former Order, although "all appointments, awards or decorations conferred prior to 30 November 2021 pursuant to the Letters Patent shall continue to be acknowledged as validly conferred; and all holders of appointments, awards or decorations conferred pursuant to the Letters Patent shall be deemed to be members of the (new) Order".

== Officers ==
- Sovereign: Queen Elizabeth II, as Queen of Barbados (1980–2021)
- Chancellor: The Governor-General of Barbados (1980–2021) and then the President of Barbados (2021–present)
