= Errol Barrow =

Barbadian politician (1920–1987)

The Right Excellent Errol Walton Barrow PC QC
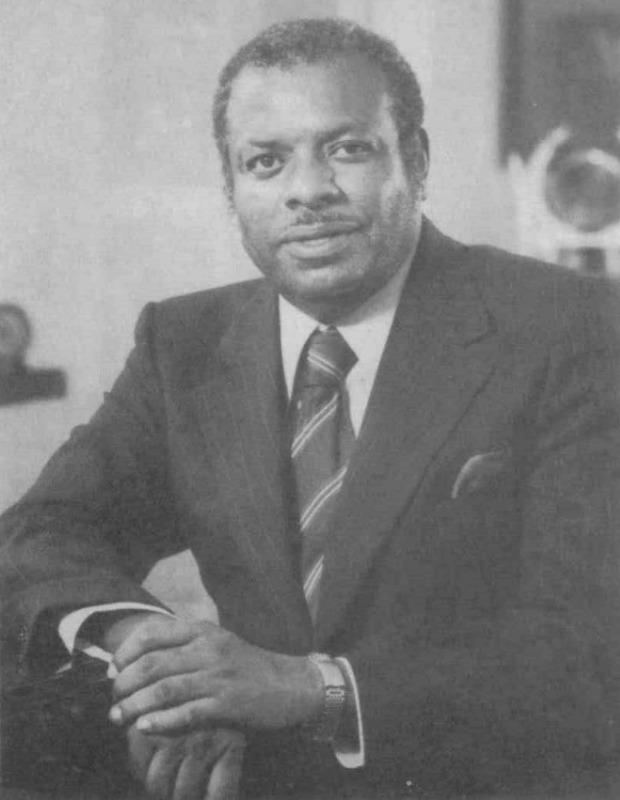
- Barrow in 1976

1st Prime Minister of Barbados
- In office 29 May 1986 – 1 June 1987
- Monarch: Elizabeth II
- Governor-General: Hugh Springer
- Deputy: Lloyd Erskine Sandiford
- Preceded by: Bernard St. John
- Succeeded by: Lloyd Erskine Sandiford
- In office 30 November 1966 – 8 September 1976
- Monarch: Elizabeth II
- Governors-General: John Montague Stow; Arleigh Winston Scott
- Deputy: James Cameron Tudor (1966-1971); Cuthbert Edwy Talma (1971-1976)
- Preceded by: Position established
- Succeeded by: Tom Adams

3rd Premier of Barbados
- In office 4 December 1961 – 30 November 1966
- Monarch: Elizabeth II
- Governor: John Montague Stow
- Deputy: James Cameron Tudor
- Preceded by: Hugh Cummins
- Succeeded by: Position abolished

Personal details
- Born: 21 January 1920 Saint Lucy, British Windward Islands (present day Barbados)
- Died: 1 June 1987 (aged 67) Bridgetown, Barbados
- Party: Democratic Labour Party (1955–1987)
- Other political affiliations: Barbados Labour Party (before 1955)
- Spouse: Carolyn Marie Barrow, (nee Plaskett)
- Children: 3
- Education: Harrison College; Inns of Court; London School of Economics
- Occupation: Lawyer; Jurist; Academic; Professor; Author; Member of Parliament; Politician

Military service
- Allegiance: Great Britain
- Branch/service: Royal Air Force
- Years of service: 1940–1947
- Rank: Flying Officer

Errol Walton Barrow PC QC (21 January 1920 – 1 June 1987) was a Barbadian statesman and the first prime minister of Barbados. Born into a family of political and civic activists in the parish of Saint Lucy, he became a WWII aviator, combat veteran, lawyer, politician, gourmet cook and author. He is often referred to as the "Father of Independence" in Barbados.

== Early life ==
Errol Walton Barrow was born on 21 January 1920 in Saint Lucy, Barbados, the fourth of five children born to the Rev. Reginald Grant Barrow (1889–1980) and his wife Ruth Albertha (née O'Neal) (1884–1939). Ruth was the daughter of a prosperous blacksmith whose success allowed him to purchase the plantation at Saint Lucy, where Errol would later be born.

Reverend Barrow, an Anglican priest, had been appointed headmaster of the Alleyne school after his sermons as curate of St Lucy parish church brought him into conflict with the island's ruling class and church hierarchy. His removal from the pulpit did not succeed in curtailing his advocacy and agitation on behalf of poor black labourers on the island. In 1919 after he challenged the financial misappropriations of the white planters who oversaw the school's endowment, the church summarily transferred him to the island of St. Croix in the US Virgin Islands (USVI) leaving his wife alone to give birth to their second son at her family home, before she could join her husband with their four infant children.

As parish priest at Holy Cross Episcopal Church, Rev. Barrow's brand of what was later termed "liberation theology", was no better received by church authorities there than it had been in Barbados. By late 1920, he was forced out of Holy Cross and he founded St. Luke AME, the first African Methodist Episcopal Church in the USVI. Although he found a home for his values in the AME Church, his theological freedom made him all the more dangerous in the eyes of the island's authorities, and in 1922 he was deported by order of the Governor as an "undesirable".

Rev. Barrow eventually made his way to New York and became a Bishop in the AME church. Unfortunately, he never reunited with his wife and it was thus that Errol Barrow spent the first six years of his life in St Croix and began his education at the Danish Preparatory School there. He would not see his father again until years later.

Ruth Barrow returned to Barbados to raise her five children with the help of her extended family, living with their grandmother Catherine O’Neal in Bridgetown. Her older brother, Dr. Charles Duncan O’Neal, was a prominent physician and activist (later a National Hero of Barbados) who founded the Democratic League and Workingmen's Association, the first socialist organization in Barbados. Under his fatherly influence, Dr. O'Neal's philosophies formed the core of the young Errol's political and social beliefs. Among Errol's playmates at his grandmother's house on Crumpton Street was his cousin Hugh Springer, later Sir Hugh, Governor General of Barbados and the third member of the family to be named a National Hero.

In Barbados, Errol first attended Wesley Hall Boys School before winning a scholarship to Combermere School, which he attended for one year before being admitted to Harrison College, then the most prestigious boys school on the island. It was during his schoolboy days that Barrow acquired the nickname "Dipper", ostensibly for his awkward cricket batting style. It was a moniker that would follow him as an affectionate brand well into his political career. After graduating from Harrison Barrow spent a year working as a legal clerk while studying to earn a scholarship to Codrington College, the school from which his father had emerged as its youngest ever graduate in 1919. His mother died in 1939, and he won the Island Scholarship in 1940, but by December of that year he had chosen a different path.

== World War II and the aftermath ==
In December 1940, Errol Barrow, along with 11 other of his countrymen who became known as "The Second Barbadian Contingent", enlisted in the Royal Air Force to serve during World War II. His sister Dame Nita Barrow recounted the event in her eulogy to him at his funeral.

"I as the big sister packed his clothes ready for his move to the College. Then as he was about to leave a couple of days later, he calmly announced that he would not be going to College. 'I'm going to England. I've joined the Royal Air Force.' "

After joining the RAF Volunteer Reserve in London as an Aircraftman 2 (AC2), Barrow underwent initial training for light bomber crews at RAF Benson. He was then stationed at RAF Marham and trained as a wireless operator. By January 1942 he had been promoted to AC1 and was posted to No. 17 Initial Training Wing in August. Thereafter, he undertook an 18-month navigator training course in Canada. Barrow was awarded his Air Navigator wings and promoted to Sergeant on 25 November 1943.

At this point Barrow was united with the men whose lives would become mutually dependent on each other if they were to survive the war: RAF pilot Andrew Leslie Cole and RAAF Wireless/Air gunners Leo Leslie J. Schultz and Robert Allen Stewart and RAF Navigator and Bomber Errol Walton Barrow spent four months training for operational missions in Nova Scotia, graduating on 7 April 1944. The newly formed crew returned to England on 20 September 1944 and joined 88 Squadron, part of the 2nd Tactical Air Force (TAF), flying Douglas Boston light bombers (aka DB-7s and A-20s by the Americans). Between 23 September 1944 and 26 March 1945, Errol Barrow would fly 48 operational sorties giving him 103 hours and 25 mins combat flying. During that time he would have seen first-hand the horrors of medium-altitude bombing. Under battle conditions Barrow proved himself to be an exceptionally competent navigator. His key task as navigator was to get the pilot and crew to their destination, then once over the target to discharge the bomb load and then get the crew back home.

Barrow saw active service supporting the Allied ground forces, bombing German communication infrastructure positions and airfields over the European theatre. His first sorties included supporting ground forces involved in the Battle for Arnhem. Others included support for ground forces during the Battle of the Bulge. At wars end he was appointed as personal navigator to the Commander in Chief of the British Zone of occupied Germany, Air Chief Marshall Sir William Sholto Douglas. During that period Barrow rose to the rank of Flying Officer. Sholto Douglas, who later became chairman of British European Airways, remained close to Barrow and made him godfather to his only child.

His final RAF posting saw him seconded to the Colonial Office, where he oversaw the education and vocational training initiatives for ex-servicemen from all of the colonial territories. Notably of the twelve men who left Barbados as part of the Second Contingent, six were killed during the war.

In September 1947, he was given special permission by the University of London to study at the London School of Economics and study law at the Inns of Court concurrently, taking degrees in 1950 and 1949 respectively. During that time, Barrow also served as Chairman of the Council of Colonial Students where his contemporaries included Forbes Burnham, Michael Manley, Pierre Trudeau, and Lee Kwan Yew, all destined to become political leaders in their home countries.

== Political career ==
Barrow returned to Barbados in 1950 and was elected to the Barbados Parliament in 1951 as a member of the Barbados Labour Party (BLP) representing the parish of Saint George. Feeling the fever of anti-colonialism he had inculcated during his student days in London, he quickly became dissatisfied by general failure of the incremental approach to change advocated by the party stalwarts and their continued support of imperialist powers. By 1952, he began to openly challenge his party's policies and by 1955 made a declaration in Parliament stating: "I no longer want to be associated with them politically or otherwise." ^{:72}

In April 1955, Barrow and 21 other like-minded politicians and activists adopted the Constitution of the Democratic Labour Party (DLP) as a progressive alternative to the BLP. In the 1956 general election, the DLP fielded 16 candidates, of whom 12 were defeated, including the incumbent Barrow in his Saint George constituency. ^{:75}

Barrow returned to parliament in the by-election of 1958 representing the parish of Saint John and was elected Chairman of the DLP in 1959. In December 1961, the party won the general election with Barrow as its leader. He then served as Premier of Barbados from 1961 until 1966 when, after leading the country to independence from Great Britain, he became the island's first Prime Minister. He served continuously in that capacity as well as stints as Minister of Finance, and Minister of Foreign Affairs for the next ten years.

During his tenure, the DLP government accelerated industrial development, expanded the tourist industry to reduce the island's economic dependence on sugar, introduced National Health Insurance and Social Security, and implemented free secondary school education.

Barrow was a dedicated proponent of regional integration, spearheading the foundation of the Caribbean Free Trade Association (CARIFTA) in 1965. Eight years later CARIFTA evolved into the Caribbean Community (CARICOM), when Barrow, together with Forbes Burnham of Guyana, Dr. Eric Williams of Trinidad and Tobago and Michael Manley of Jamaica enacted the Treaty of Chaguaramas to bolster political and economic relations between the English-speaking Caribbean territories.

After another landslide victory in 1971, the DLP returned to the electorate in 1976 for a mandate after two years of bitter controversy over constitutional amendments put forth by the government. Barrow, who had invited public comment on the amendments verbally lashed out at those who had been critical of what he viewed as a minor procedural change in the appointment of judges. A general economic downturn that affected most countries in the hemisphere contributed to a shift in public sentiment resulting in the party's election defeat.

As an indomitable advocate of Caribbean sovereignty he fiercely opposed interference in Caribbean affairs. As opposition leader in 1983, he spoke out forcefully against the United States invasion of Grenada and he was scathing in his criticism of other Caribbean leaders who kow-towed to Washington in the hope of getting economic handouts:

"Mr. Seaga (Prime Minister of Jamaica, Edward Seaga) thinks that the solution to Jamaica's problems is to get President Reagan to play Santa Claus. I do not believe in Santa Claus."

In May 1986, after 10 years in opposition, Barrow was re-elected as Prime Minister in a landslide victory in which the DLP won 24 of 27 seats in the House of Assembly. The campaign was notable for an address he gave at a political rally some two weeks before the election, which came to be known as the "Mirror Image" speech. In it, Barrow rhetorically asked Barbadians what kind of a future they saw for themselves when they looked in the mirror; contrasting a life of menial labour as an émigré in the developed world, or staying and building a strong and independent Barbados to rival other small states like Singapore.

His re-election served as a catalyst for resurgent nationalism in the region, which by and large had subordinated itself to U.S. aid policy in the early 1980s. Barrow wasted no time in distancing himself from the "mendicant mentality" of his predecessors J. M. G. Adams and Bernard St. John. In his first press conference as Prime Minister he referred to Reagan as "that cowboy in the White House". In a British interview, he characterized the President of the United States as "a zombie; he's programmed, a very dangerous person".

He chastised Washington for its treatment of not only the Caribbean states, but also of Canada and the United Kingdom, which he described as Barbados' closest allies. His political opponents deemed his attacks on Reagan as "tactically stupid", but for most Barbadians, his outspokenness meant that "The Skipper" was back.

A year after his re-election, Prime Minister Errol Barrow collapsed and died at his home on 1 June 1987. By an act of Parliament in 1998, Barrow was posthumously named as one of the National Heroes of Barbados.

== Personal life ==
Errol Barrow was a son of the Rev. Reginald Grant Barrow (1889–1980) and Ruth Albertha O'Neal (maiden; 1884–1939). His sister, Dame Nita Barrow, also became a social activist, humanitarian leader and later Governor General of Barbados. He had three other siblings, and two half-siblings from his father's second marriage.

Errol Barrow married Carolyn Marie Plaskett, the daughter of a prominent American Baptist minister in Orange, NJ, on 18 November 1945. Their union produced two children: Lesley (1949–2008) and David (born 1953). Despite their eventual estrangement the couple never divorced.

In the late 1950s, his relationship with union activist Thelma Padmore produced a son Eric (born 1960).

In her autobiography, the American singer Nina Simone claimed to have had an affair with Barrow (whose first name she misspells) during the brief period that she lived in Barbados.

During the last thirteen years of his life until his death, Barrow lived with socialite Jeanine Leemans.

== Legacy ==
The Errol Barrow Centre for Creative Imagination, at the University of the West Indies, Cave Hill campus, promotes the making, study and appreciation of the arts. It is "a hub for creative expression and the creative cycle: creation, production, distribution, appreciation and preservation of art". He is also one of the namesakes of the island's ABC Highway.

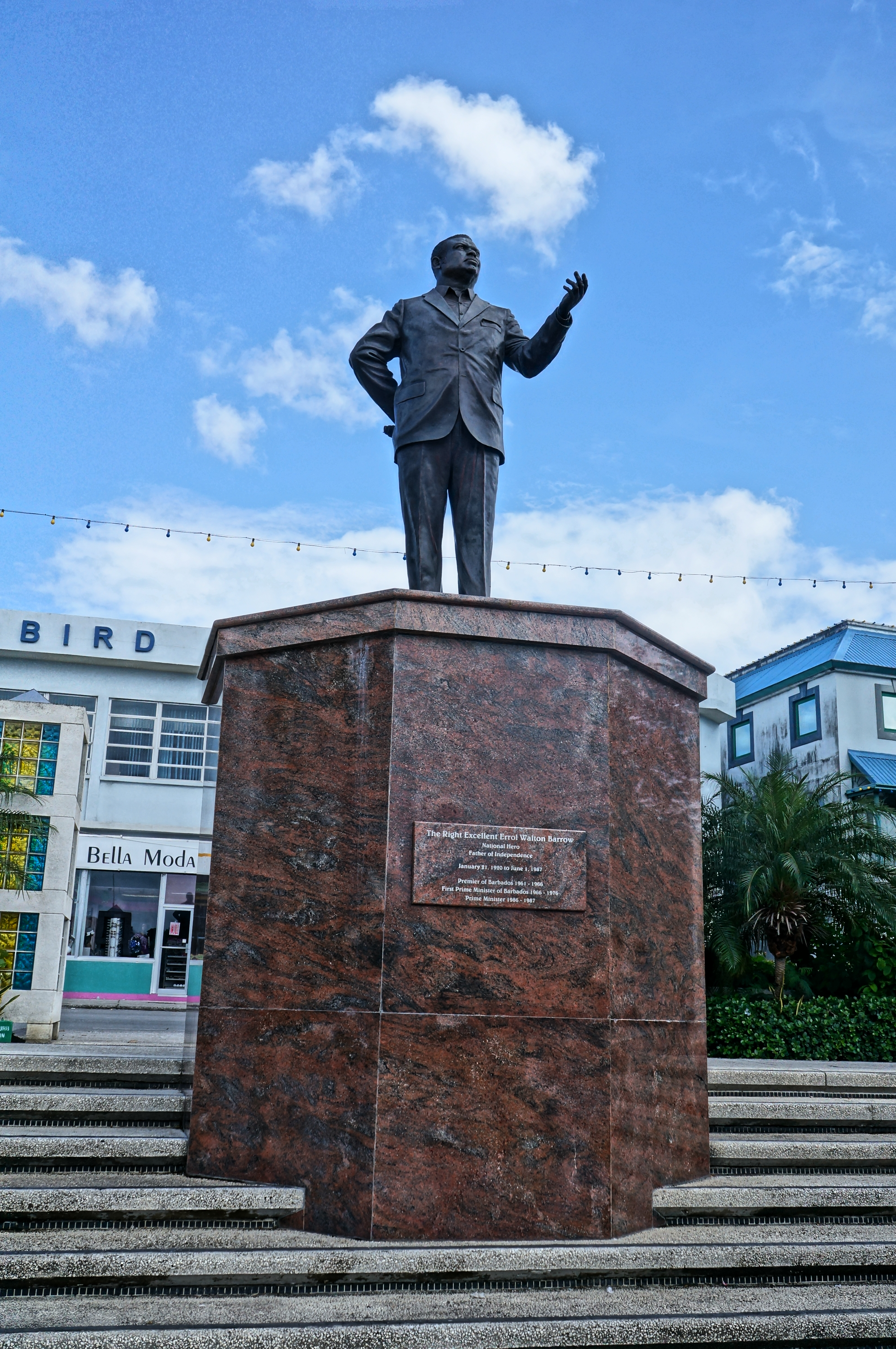
Statue of Errol Barrow at Independence Square, Bridgetown, Barbados

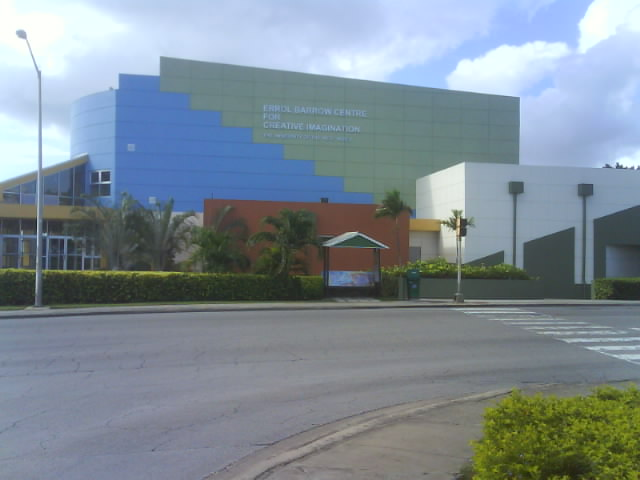
Errol Barrow Center For Creative Imagination

== See also ==
- Politics of Barbados
- List of Premiers/Prime Ministers of Barbados
- National Heroes of Barbados

Parliament of Barbados
Preceded by	Member of Parliament for Saint George; 1951–1956	Succeeded by
Preceded by	Member of Parliament for Saint John; 1958–1987	Succeeded by David Thompson
Political offices
Preceded by Hugh Cummins	Premier of Barbados; 1961–1966	Office abolished
Preceded by Hugh Cummins	Minister of Finance of Barbados; 1961–1976	Succeeded by Tom Adams
New office	Prime Minister of Barbados; 1966–1976	Succeeded by Tom Adams
Preceded by Harold Bernard St. John	Prime Minister of Barbados; 1986–1987	Succeeded by Erskine Sandiford
Party political offices
New political party	Leader of the Democratic Labour Party; 1955–1976	Succeeded by Frederick Smith
Preceded by Frederick Smith	Leader of the Democratic Labour Party; 1978–1987	Succeeded by Lloyd Erskine Sandiford
