= Tom Adams (politician) =

Former Prime Minister of Barbados

The Right Honourable Tom Adams QC
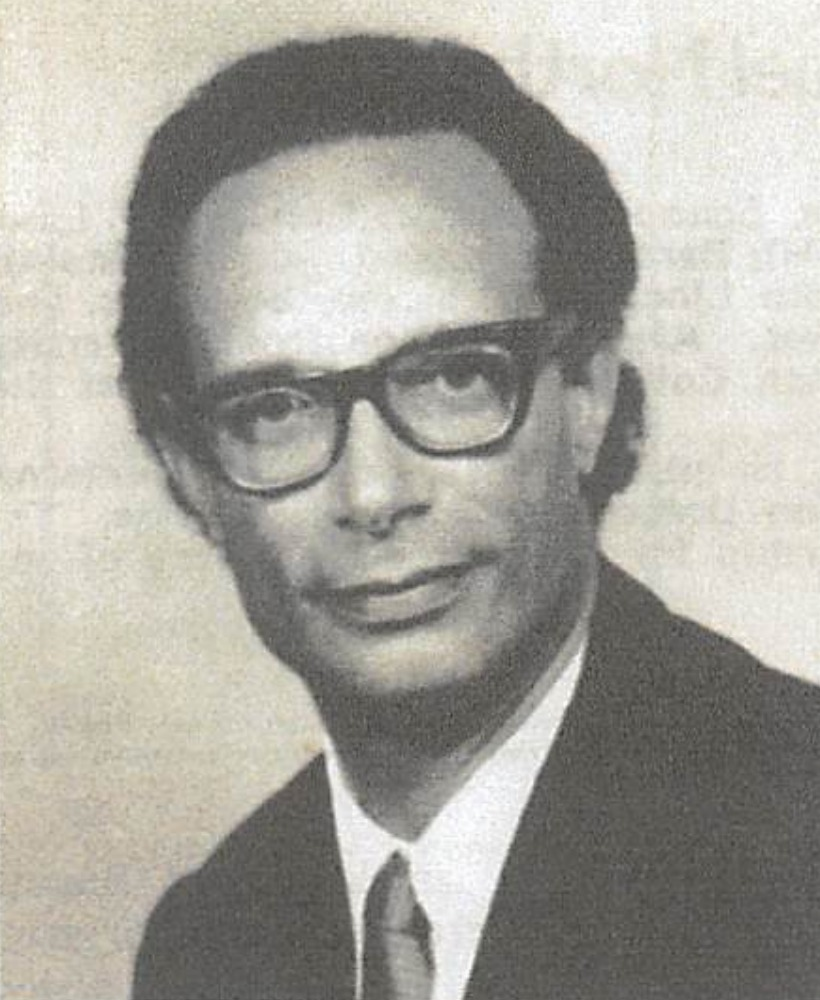

2nd Prime Minister of Barbados
- In office September 8, 1976 – March 11, 1985
- Monarch: Elizabeth II
- Governors-General: Deighton Lisle Ward; Hugh Springer
- Deputy: Bernard St. John
- Preceded by: Errol Barrow
- Succeeded by: Bernard St. John

Personal details
- Born: Jon Michael Geoffrey Manningham Adams; September 24, 1931 British Windward Islands (present day Barbados)
- Died: March 11, 1985 (aged 53) Barbados
- Party: Barbados Labour Party
- Spouse: Genevieve Adams
- Occupation: Lawyer

Jon Michael Geoffrey Manningham Adams (September 24, 1931 – March 11, 1985), known as Tom Adams, was a Barbadian politician who served as the second Prime Minister of Barbados from 1976 until 1985.

== Biography ==
=== Personal life ===
The only son of Sir Grantley Adams, a lawyer and the only Premier of the West Indies Federation, and Grace Adams (née Thorne), Tom Adams was educated at Harrison College, from which he won a scholarship to Magdalen College, Oxford.

=== Prime minister ===
He served as the second Prime Minister of Barbados between 1976 and 1985. His party, the Barbados Labour Party (BLP), had capitalized on the population's desire for a change from Errol Barrow's Democratic Labour Party, which had governed the island since independence in 1966.

Adams moved the country back towards the liberalism the BLP had been founded on, a trend in keeping with the popularity of liberal economist Friedrich Hayek in Margaret Thatcher's Britain and Ronald Reagan's United States in the early 1980s.

In 1983, Adams was the leading proponent in the grouping of Eastern Caribbean states that asked Reagan to intervene when a leadership struggle within the Leninist ruling party on Grenada ended in bloodshed. On Oct. 12, a military-backed, insurgent faction led by Bernard Coard, Grenada's deputy prime minister, ousted Prime Minister Maurice Bishop and put him under house arrest. When Bishop's followers sought to restore him to power a week later, he and seven of his most loyal followers were executed by a Grenadian military firing squad. Adams was convinced that further disorder on Grenada was inevitable and posed a threat to the entire region. He brokered support for an intervention in secret diplomatic dealings with the Reagan administration and like-minded leaders in the English-speaking Caribbean. Barbados was used as a staging point for some of the U.S. forces, and a nominal contingent of the Barbados Defence Force accompanied in the invasion force's wake, not least to allow (as Barrow claimed) Reagan to gild the statistics. The Barbadian population was of two minds about Adams' move, generally conceding that Bishop's murder had moved Grenada too far, but being uneasy with Reagan's US heavy-handedness. Nevertheless, Adams' BLP was tipped to win the upcoming elections at the time. During his tenure as prime minister, he held the additional portfolio of Minister of Finance.

Adams died of a heart attack at Ilaro Court, the Prime Minister's official residence, on March 11, 1985. He was the first sitting prime minister of Barbados to die in office. He was buried in Bridgetown, Barbados, at the churchyard of the Cathedral Church of Saint Michael and All Angels on Saint Michael's Row.

Queen Elizabeth II was among global leaders who sent condolence as was addressed to Sir Hugh Springer, the then Governor-General of Barbados, which read:

″I was very shocked to hear of the sudden death of the prime minister, and Prince Philip and I send our deepest sympathy to the government and people of Barbados. The distinguished service given by Tom Adams to Barbados and to the Commonwealth (of Britain and its former colonies) during nine years as prime minister will always be remembered.″

Adams' deputy Prime Minister, Bernard St. John, succeeded him but the Barbadian electorate turned back to the other political party, voting in Errol Barrow, and his Democratic Labour Party in the subsequent election in 1986. Barrow also died in office in 1987 shortly after his election victory.

Many international leaders throughout the Commonwealth Caribbean and members of the resident diplomatic corp presented condolence.

== Legacy ==
The ten-story building in Bridgetown which houses the Central Bank of Barbados is today known as the Tom Adams Financial Centre in his honour. He is also one of the namesakes of the island's ABC Highway.

== See also ==
- Politics of Barbados
- List of Premiers/Prime Ministers of Barbados

Political offices
Preceded by Errol Barrow	Prime Minister of Barbados; 1976–1985	Succeeded by Harold Bernard St. John
Preceded by Errol Barrow	Minister of Finance of Barbados; 1976–1985	Succeeded by Harold Bernard St. John
