= Hugh Springer =

Governor-general of Barbados (1913–1994)

The Most Excellent Sir Hugh Springer GCMG CBE

4th Governor-General of Barbados
- In office 24 February 1984 – 6 June 1990
- Monarch: Elizabeth II
- Prime Minister: Harold Bernard St. John; Errol Barrow; Lloyd Erskine Sandiford
- Preceded by: Deighton Lisle Ward
- Succeeded by: Nita Barrow

Personal details
- Born: 22 June 1913 Saint Michael, Barbados
- Died: 14 April 1994 (aged 80) Bridgetown, Barbados
- Spouse: Dorothy Gittens
- Education: Harrison College; Hertford College, Oxford

Sir Hugh Worrell Springer GCMG CBE (22 June 1913 – 14 April 1994) was the organiser and first general secretary of the Barbados Workers' Union, and Barbados' fourth governor-general. He was a lawyer, politician and public servant. By an act of Parliament in 1998, Springer was named as one of the eleven National Heroes of Barbados.

== Early life and education ==
Springer was educated at Harrison College in Bridgetown, Barbados. Upon receiving a Barbados Scholarship in Classics, Springer studied Greek as an undergraduate at Hertford College, University of Oxford, receiving a BA in 1936.

== Career ==
=== Law and politics ===
He was called to the bar at the Inner Temple in 1938, and subsequently returned to Barbados. He practised law in Barbados from 1938 to 1947.

He co-founded the Progressive League with the barrister Grantley Adams. As General Secretary of the League, Springer transformed it into two initially closely related organisations, the Barbados Labour Party and the Barbados Workers' Union. From 1940 to 1947 he was the General Secretary of the Barbados Labour Party and also General Secretary of the Barbados Workers’ Union. In 1940 he was elected to the House of Assembly.

=== Higher education ===
Springer perceived Higher Education as vitally important for achieving regional cooperation and integration. He had previously sought employment in education in London in the 1930s, but was rejected on the basis of his ethnicity. In 1938 he taught Classics temporarily at Codrington College. He was a member of the Asquith Commission on Colonial Higher Education in 1943-4 and sat on the Provisional Council of the University College at Kingston which was founded as an outcome of the commission. In 1947 resigned from the Cabinet of Barbados and took up the position as the Registrar of the University College of West Indies, which he held until 1963, when he became Director until 1966.

=== International politics ===
Following the collapse of the Federation of the West Indies in 1962, Springer dedicated time to considering regional politics. He received a John Simon Guggenheim Fellowship and a Fellowship of the Harvard Centre for International Affairs where he completed his 1962 book Reflections on the Failure of the First West Indian Federation. During 1962-63 he was a Senior Visiting Fellow at All Souls College, University of Oxford. On returning to Barbados, Springer was appointed as the Director of the Institute of Education at the University of the West Indies.

=== Commonwealth and international education ===
Springer dedicated much of the period from 1964–84 to the areas of commonwealth and international education. He was Assistant Secretary General (Education) at the Commonwealth Secretariat (1966–1970), and Secretary General of the Association of Commonwealth Universities (1970–1980), and served as a Director of the United World Colleges (1978–1990).

He was appointed Governor-General of Barbados in 1984, a position which he held until he retired due to ill-health in 1990.

== Honors ==
Springer received an honorary doctorate from Heriot-Watt University in 1976, and was elected as an honorary fellow of Hertford College, Oxford in 1974 and All Souls College in 1988, where a portrait of Hugh Springer by Hector Whistler is now on display in the hall of the College.

Springer received a Doctorate of Civil Law from the University of New Brunswick in 1980.

In 1998, Hugh Springer was named as one of the ten Barbadian National Heroes, designated by the Order of National Heroes Act. A biography of Hugh Springer was published in 2008, authored by Kean H. W. Springer. A commemorative stamp of Hugh Springer was issued in 2016 as part of ‘The Builders of Barbados' series.

== Selected publications ==
Springer, H.W. 1962. Reflections of the Failure of the First West Indian Federation.

Springer, H. W. 1967 "University-Government Relationships in the West Indies ", in University of London, Institute of Commonwealth Studies, Collected Seminar Papers on Relations between Governments and Universities (London: Institute of Commonwealth Studies)

Trade union offices
Preceded by New position	General Secretary of the Barbados Workers' Union; 1941–1947	Succeeded by Frank Walcott
Political offices
Preceded by William Randolph Douglas	Governor General of Barbados; 1984–1990	Succeeded by Nita Barrow
