= Governor-General of Barbados =

Representative of the monarch

- Coat of arms of Barbados

- Flag of the governor-general

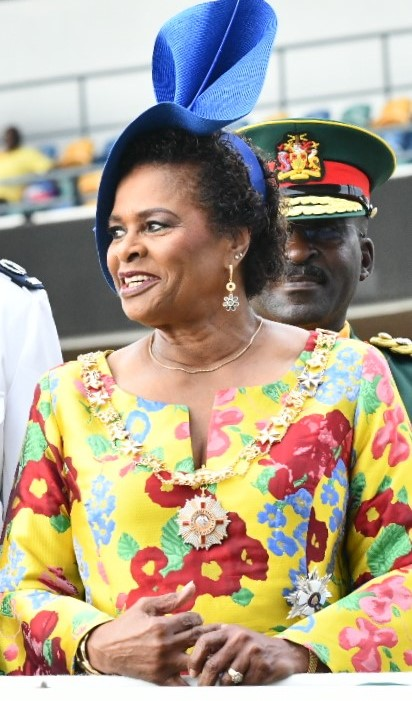
- Last in office Sandra Mason; 8 January 2018 – 30 November 2021
- Style: His/Her Excellency
- Status: Abolished
- Residence: Government House, Barbados
- Appointer: Monarch of Barbados
- Term length: At Her Majesty's pleasure
- Formation: 30 November 1966
- First holder: John Montague Stow
- Final holder: Sandra Mason
- Abolished: 30 November 2021
- Salary: 220,998 BBD annually

The governor-general of Barbados was the representative of the Barbadian monarch from independence in 1966 until the establishment of a republic in 2021. Under the government's Table of Precedence for Barbados, the governor-general of Barbados was regarded as being the most important of all personnel of the Barbados government.

The office was established by Chapter IV of the 1966 Constitution of Barbados. The governor-general was appointed by the monarch on the advice of the prime minister of Barbados. The governor-general exercised the monarch's executive powers and gave assent to bills in the monarch's name, promulgating them as laws. The powers of the monarch and the governor-general were limited, and they, in most instances, exercised authority on the advice of the prime minister or other persons or bodies within Barbados.

The office of the governor-general was established when Barbados gained independence in 1966. Since then, Barbados had eight governors-general. On 30 November 2021, Barbados became a republic and the office of governor-general was abolished.

== Duties ==
The Barbadian monarch, on the advice of her Barbadian prime minister, appointed a governor-general to be her representative in Barbados. Both the monarch and the governor-general held much power in the country, though it was rarely used unilaterally; it was usually only used in such a way in emergencies and in some cases war.

The governor-general represented the monarch on ceremonial occasions such as the State Opening of Parliament and the presentation of honours and military parades. Under the constitution, the governor-general was given authority to act in some matters; for example, in appointing and disciplining officers of the civil service, granting "any person convicted of any offence against the laws of Barbados a pardon", and in proroguing parliament. However, in only a few cases was the governor-general empowered to act entirely on his/her own discretion, often requiring the countersignature of the prime minister to exercise their powers.

The governor-general of Barbados also chaired the Privy Council of Barbados.

== List of governors-general ==
Following is a list of people who served as governor-general of Barbados from independence in 1966 to the establishment of a republic in 2021.

Symbols

^† Died in office.

Denotes acting governors-general

No.	Portrait	Name (Birth–Death)	Term of office			Monarch (Reign)
No.	Portrait	Name (Birth–Death)	Took office	Left office	Time in office	Monarch (Reign)
1		John Montague Stow (1911–1997)	30 November 1966	18 May 1967	169 days	Elizabeth II (1966–2021)
2		Arleigh Winston Scott (1900–1976)	18 May 1967	9 August 1976^{[†]}	9 years, 82 days	Elizabeth II (1966–2021)
–		William Randolph Douglas (1921–2003); Acting Governor-General	9 August 1976	17 November 1976	100 days	Elizabeth II (1966–2021)
3		Deighton Lisle Ward (1909–1984)	17 November 1976	9 January 1984^{[†]}	7 years, 53 days	Elizabeth II (1966–2021)
–		William Randolph Douglas (1921–2003); Acting Governor-General	10 January 1984	24 February 1984	45 days	Elizabeth II (1966–2021)
4		Hugh Springer (1913–1994)	24 February 1984	6 June 1990	6 years, 104 days	Elizabeth II (1966–2021)
5		Nita Barrow (1916–1995)	6 June 1990	19 December 1995^{[†]}	5 years, 195 days	Elizabeth II (1966–2021)
–		Denys Williams (1929–2014); Acting Governor-General	19 December 1995	1 June 1996	165 days	Elizabeth II (1966–2021)
6		Clifford Husbands (1926–2017)	1 June 1996	31 October 2011	15 years, 151 days	Elizabeth II (1966–2021)
–		Elliott Belgrave (b. 1931); Acting Governor-General	1 November 2011	30 May 2012	211 days	Elizabeth II (1966–2021)
–		Sandra Mason (b. 1949); Acting Governor-General	30 May 2012	1 June 2012	2 days	Elizabeth II (1966–2021)
7		Elliott Belgrave (b. 1931)	1 June 2012	30 June 2017	5 years, 29 days	Elizabeth II (1966–2021)
–		Philip Greaves (b. 1931); Acting Governor-General	1 July 2017	8 January 2018	191 days	Elizabeth II (1966–2021)
8		Sandra Mason (b. 1949)	8 January 2018	30 November 2021	3 years, 326 days	Elizabeth II (1966–2021)

== Official oath of office ==
According to the First Schedule section of the 1966 Constitution of Barbados, the official oath of office for the governor-general of Barbados was as follows:

I, (name), do swear that I will well and truly serve Her Majesty Queen Elizabeth II, Her Heirs and Successors, in the office of Governor-General. So help me God.

== Abolition ==
In September 2020, the government of Barbados announced that it planned to abolish the Barbadian monarchy and the position of the governor-general, and the Queen of Barbados to be replaced with a ceremonial president, akin to that of the president of Trinidad and Tobago. Incumbent governor-general Sandra Mason was elected president on 20 October 2021 and took office on 30 November 2021.

== See also ==
- Government House, the official residence of the governor-general
- Order of Barbados
- List of governors of Barbados
- Governor-General of the West Indies Federation
- List of prime ministers of Barbados
