= Deighton Lisle Ward =

Politician

Sir Deighton Lisle Ward GCMG GCVO

3rd Governor-General of Barbados
- In office 17 November 1976 – 9 January 1984
- Monarch: Elizabeth II
- Prime Minister: Tom Adams
- Preceded by: Arleigh Winston Scott
- Succeeded by: Hugh Springer

Personal details
- Born: 16 May 1909 British Windward Islands (present day Barbados)
- Died: 9 January 1984 (aged 74) Barbados
- Education: Harrison College

Sir Deighton Harcourt Lisle Ward GCMG GCVO (16 May 1909 – 9 January 1984) was a Barbadian politician who served as third governor-general of Barbados from 1976 to 1984.

== Biography ==
In 1958, he was one of the candidates of the Barbados Labour Party when they won four of the five seats in the House of Representatives in the Federal Parliament of the West Indies Federation. He was a Freemason and also President of the Barbados Football Association. The first native Governor-General, Arleigh Winston Scott, took office in 1967 after Barbados independence was granted in 1966.

Ten years later, Scott died in office and on 17 November 1976, Deighton Lisle Ward was sworn in as Governor-General. The Governor-General of Barbados is the domestic representative appointed by the Queen of Barbados. The Queen of Barbados is also the head of state for fifteen states in the Commonwealth Nations which were former colonies of Britain. Deighton Ward was the Governor-General of Barbados from 1976 until 1984 when he died in office.

He was a Knight Grand Cross of the Royal Victorian Order and Knight Grand Cross of The Most Distinguished Order of Saint Michael and Saint George.
