= Prime Minister of Barbados =

Head of government

- Coat of arms of Barbados

- Standard of the Prime Minister

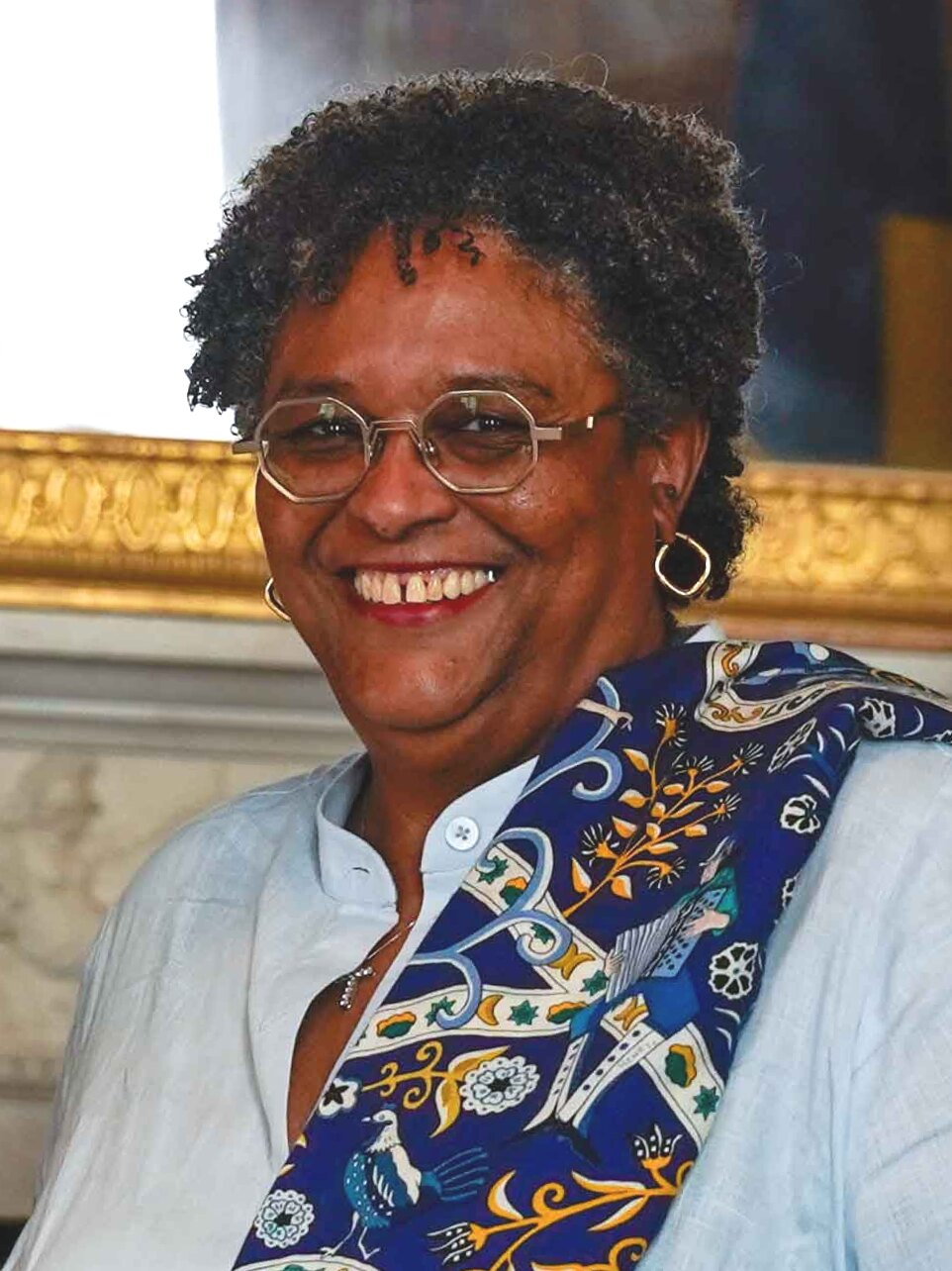
- Incumbent; Mia Mottley since 25 May 2018
- Style: The Honourable
- Type: Head of government
- Member of: House of Assembly
- Residence: Ilaro Court
- Seat: Bridgetown
- Appointer: President of Barbados
- Term length: Five years, renewable indefinitely
- Formation: 30 November 1966; 59 years ago
- First holder: Errol Barrow
- Deputy: Deputy Prime Minister of Barbados
- Salary: Barbadian dollars $213,334/US$ 106,667 annually

The prime minister of Barbados is the head of government of Barbados. The prime minister is appointed by the president under the terms of the Constitution. As the nominal holder of executive authority, the president holds responsibility for conducting parliamentary elections and for proclaiming one of the candidates as prime minister.

== Background ==
Sir Grantley Herbert Adams was appointed Barbados' first Premier on 1 February 1953 when Barbados attained full self-government. When Barbados negotiated full political independence from Britain on 30 November 1966, the office was renamed Prime Minister. Despite the renaming, the functions of the office were not significantly changed.

== Appointment and tenure ==
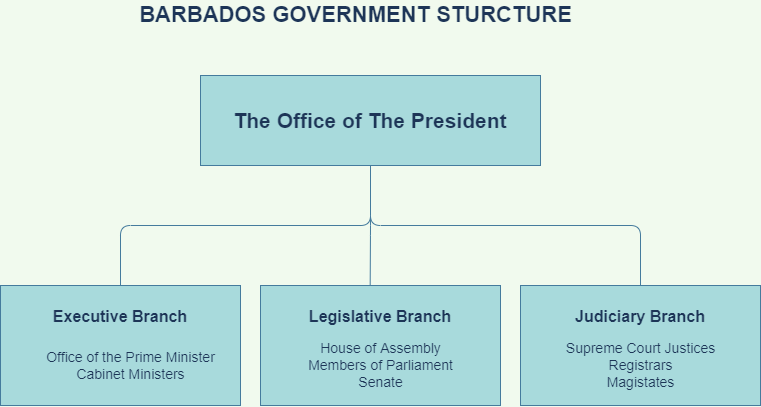
Simplification of the government structure of Barbados

As a former British colony, Barbados has largely adopted British political models and follows the Westminster, or Cabinet, system of government, in which the executive branch of government is responsible to the legislature. The prime minister was historically appointed by the governor-general until 2021, and by the president of Barbados thereafter, to serve a maximum five-year term in Parliament. The president must endeavour to find a candidate acceptable to a majority in the House; if no such candidate can be found, the president must dissolve Parliament and call an election prematurely.

Incumbent prime ministers who lose their seat in a parliamentary election may not be prime minister. If the prime minister dies, as has happened on three occasions, the president appoints a replacement from Parliament to serve the remainder of the five-year term of Parliament. The prime minister must also be supported, or at least accepted, by a majority in the House of Assembly. If at any time the prime minister loses the "confidence" of the House, he must resign, along with the entire Cabinet. In practice, this usually reduces the prime minister's appointment to a formality, as the parliamentary leader of the majority political party or coalition is invariably appointed. If, however, no such majority party or coalition exists, whether due to electoral fragmentation or to party realignments after an election, the president's role becomes much more important.

The prime minister of Barbados is technically the "first among equals," whose vote in meetings of the Cabinet carries no greater weight than that of any other minister. In practice, the prime minister dominates the government. Other ministers are appointed by the president, but on the prime minister's "advice", and may be dismissed by the prime minister at any time (although hypothetically, the prime minister's control over ministerial appointments may be tempered by the realities of coalition politics: the leader or leaders of coalition partners may insist on having a say in the matter too).

== Holders ==
There were three premiers prior to independence and there have been eight prime ministers since independence.

== Responsibilities ==
The prime minister advises the president, appoints ministers, controls a majority in the House of Assembly, and appoints 12 senators. Although the prime minister is appointed by the president of Barbados, they are almost always the leader of the majority party.

== Official oath of office ==
I, _________________________, being appointed Prime Minister, do swear that I will to the best of my judgment, at all times when so required, freely give my counsel and advice to the President (or any other person for the time being lawfully performing the functions of that office) for the good management of the public affairs of Barbados, and I do further swear that I will not on any account, at any time whatsoever, disclose the counsel, advice, opinion or vote of any particular Minister or Parliamentary Secretary and that I will not, except with the authority of the Cabinet and to such extent as may be required for the good management of the affairs of Barbados, directly or indirectly reveal the business or proceedings of the Cabinet or the nature or contents of any documents communicated to me as Prime Minister or any matter coming to my knowledge in my capacity as such, and that in all things I will be a true and faithful Prime Minister. So help me God.

== British Privy Council ==
Prior to the establishment of the Caribbean Court of Justice in 2005, it was common for Barbadian prime ministers to be nominated to the British Privy Council, whose large membership includes prominent British persons and persons from other Commonwealth nations that continue to share the same person as monarch.

Prime ministers added to the Privy council (by year):

- The Rt Hon. Errol Barrow, 1969;
- The Rt Hon. Tom Adams, 1977;
- The Rt Hon. Lloyd Erskine Sandiford, 1989;
- The Rt Hon. Owen Arthur, 1995;
- The Rt Hon. Freundel Stuart, 2014.

== See also ==
- List of Commonwealth heads of government
- Politics of Barbados
- Ilaro Court
- Prime Minister of the West Indies Federation
- Governor-General of Barbados
- List of Privy Counsellors (1952–present)
