= President of Barbados =

Head of state

- Coat of arms of Barbados

- Presidential standard

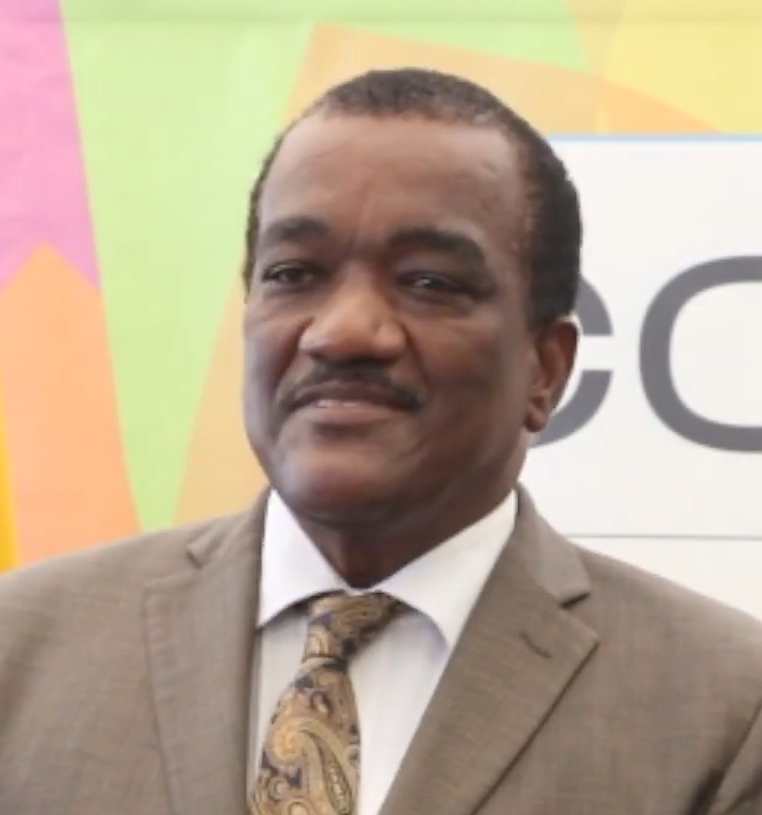
- Incumbent; Jeffrey Bostic since 30 November 2025
- Style: Mr. President (informal); His Excellency (formal)
- Status: Head of state
- Residence: State House
- Appointer: Parliament of Barbados
- Term length: Four years renewable once
- Constituting instrument: Constitution of Barbados (1966)
- Precursor: Monarch of Barbados
- Formation: November 30, 2021 (4 years ago)
- First holder: Dame Sandra Mason
- Succession: Line of Succession
- Salary: BDS $232,047 annually

The president of Barbados is the head of state of Barbados and the commander-in-chief of the Barbados Defence Force. The office was established when the country became a parliamentary republic on 30 November 2021. Prior to that date, the head of state was Elizabeth II, Queen of Barbados, who was represented on the island by a governor-general. The final person to hold that position, Dame Sandra Mason, served as Barbados' first president from 2021 to 2025, and was then succeeded by the current president, Jeffrey Bostic.

== History ==
In 1979, a commission of inquiry known as the Cox Commission on the Constitution was constituted and charged with studying the feasibility of introducing a parliamentary republican system. The Cox Commission came to the conclusion that Barbadians preferred to maintain the constitutional monarchy. The proposal to move to a republican status was therefore not pursued. The 1994 manifesto of the Barbados Labour Party dealt with the republic issue, proposing a referendum. In line with this promise, on 29 October 1996, a Constitution Review Commission, chaired by Sir Henry de Boulay Forde, was appointed to review the Constitution of Barbados. The Commission reported back on 15 December 1998, and recommended that Barbados adopt a parliamentary republican system. In 1999, the Barbados Labour Party's manifesto proposed that the findings of the commission and its recommendation that Barbados become a republic would receive the early attention of the government.

A referendum bill was introduced in parliament and had its first reading on 10 October 2000. With the dissolution of parliament just prior to the elections in 2003, the bill was not carried over.

Prime Minister Owen Arthur established in 1998 a constitutional commission led by Sir Henry Forde. It concluded, "Barbadians, with few exceptions, believe that our head of state should be a citizen of Barbados by birth or descent, who lives in Barbados." Arthur subsequently called for a referendum on becoming a republic to be held in 2005. Accordingly, a second referendum bill was introduced in 2005, and passed into law in October 2005. The referendum under the 2005 act was planned to be held concurrently with the 2008 Barbadian general election. On 2 December 2007, reports emerged that this vote was put off due to concerns raised by the Electoral and Boundaries Commission. Following the election, David Thompson replaced Arthur as prime minister, and the plan was shelved.

On 22 March 2015, Prime Minister Freundel Stuart announced his intention to move the country towards a republican form of government "in the very near future". The general secretary of the Democratic Labour Party, George Pilgrim, confirmed the move and said that it is expected to coincide with the 50th anniversary of Barbadian independence in 2016.

The Barbados Labour Party government of Prime Minister Mia Mottley announced in its throne speech in September 2020 that Barbados would become a republic by November the following year, abolishing the position of monarch of Barbados and replacing that of governor-general with a president (of Barbadian nationality) as head of state, as Mottley asserted that "Barbadians want a Barbadian head of state [sic]". (Note: The Forde commission in 1998 found the Queen of Barbados to be "the Barbadian head of state".) It was this proposal that was eventually enacted into law—on 20 September 2021, the Constitution (Amendment) (No. 2) Bill, 2021 was introduced to the Parliament of Barbados, and was subsequently passed on 6 October. Prime Minister Mia Mottley described the move as "having the confidence that we can be responsible for our affairs, in every respect"; though, the country had already been fully sovereign since 1966. The law instituted a parliamentary republic with a prime minister as head of government and a predominantly ceremonial president as head of state.

The first candidate for president of Barbados, the Governor-General of Barbados, Dame Sandra Mason, was nominated jointly by the prime minister and the leader of the opposition on 12 October 2021, and subsequently elected by parliament on 20 October. Mason took office on 30 November 2021.

== Election ==
The president is indirectly elected by the Parliament of Barbados.

The prime minister and the leader of the opposition jointly nominate a consensus candidate 90 days before the incumbent's term is due to expire, and that candidate is then elected in a walkover without a vote unless any member of Parliament lodges their objection. If an objection is lodged, the joint sitting is suspended and the two Houses of Parliament, the Senate and the House of Assembly, meet separately and each vote on accepting or rejecting the nominee. A two-thirds majority of valid votes in each house separately is then required to elect a candidate on all rounds of balloting.

If no consensus candidate is nominated by the 60th day before the end of the incumbent's term, the election is opened to other candidates. To gain ballot access in such an open election, a candidate must be nominated either by the prime minister, the leader of the opposition, or at least ten members of the House of Assembly. The requirement for a two-thirds majority of valid votes in each house separately also applies in an open election; this means that if only one candidate has been nominated, the voting system is the same as when a consensus candidate has been objected to.

== Temporary vacancy ==
Whenever the office of president is temporarily vacant; until a new president is appointed; and whenever the holder of the office is absent from Barbados, on vacation, or is for any reason unable to perform the functions conferred upon them by the Constitution, those functions are performed by an individual appointed by the prime minister, after consultation with the leader of the opposition, to serve as acting president. However, if the president is suspended from office in case of ongoing impeachment proceedings, the president of the Senate of Barbados serves as acting president. The presidential line of succession is not defined beyond that.

== Constitutional role ==
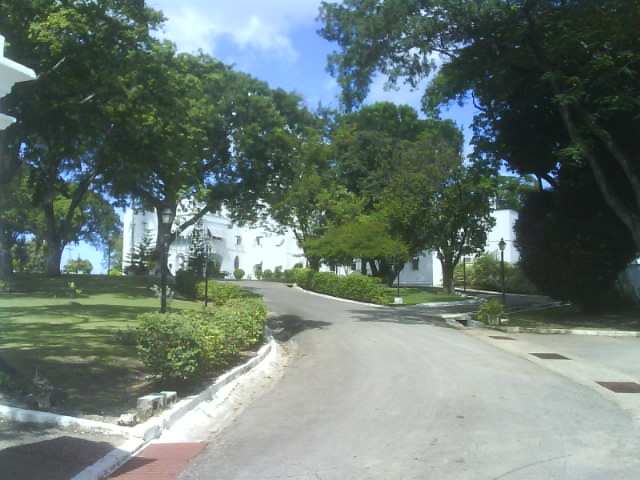
State House − the residence of the president of Barbados

Barbados' constitution gives the country a Westminster parliamentary system of government based on that of the United Kingdom, wherein the role of the head of state is both legal and practical. Similarly to other parliamentary republics in the Commonwealth of Nations such as India and Trinidad and Tobago, but unlike continental European parliamentary states such as Germany and Italy, the president of Barbados is formally vested with great constitutional power extending to all three branches of government. In practice, the constitutional conventions that bound the head of state and her representatives when Barbados was a constitutional monarchy were expected to remain in force, meaning that executive power would continue to be exercised by the prime minister and cabinet as per the amended constitution. The document codified this practice by requiring the president to "act in accordance with the advice of the Cabinet or a Minister acting under the general authority of the Cabinet" except in certain circumstances, usually described as the reserve powers.

=== Executive powers ===
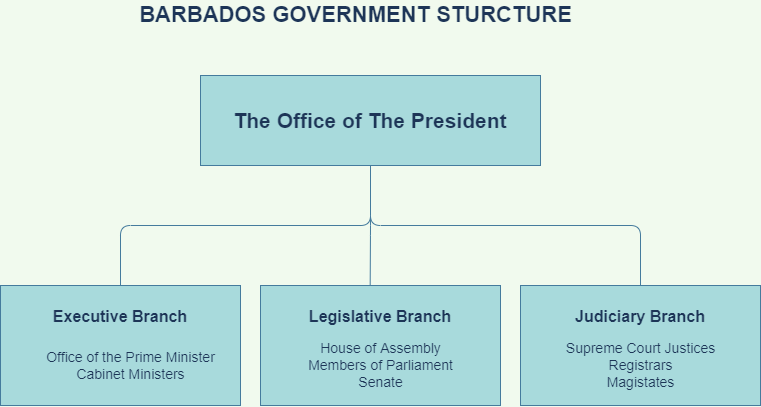
Simplification of the government structure of Barbados

The president is the nominal source of executive power. Under the amended Constitution, the president is bound, with few exceptions, to exercise this power on the advice of the prime minister and cabinet. Hence, in normal practice, as is the case with heads of state in other Westminster systems, executive authority is exercised by the prime minister and their cabinet, on behalf of the president.

The president appoints as prime minister the individual most likely to maintain the support of the House of Assembly; usually this is the leader of the political party with a majority in that house or the leader of the senior partner in a governing coalition. However, in a scenario when no party or coalition holds a majority (referred to as a minority government situation), the president's judgement about the most suitable candidate for prime minister is brought into play. Even then, the House of Assembly's right to hold a vote of no confidence in the government limits the president's freedom of action. The president must additionally appoint to Cabinet, on the advice of the prime minister, at least five other ministers. All ministers are accountable to the democratically elected House of Assembly and, through it, to the people.

=== Legislative powers ===
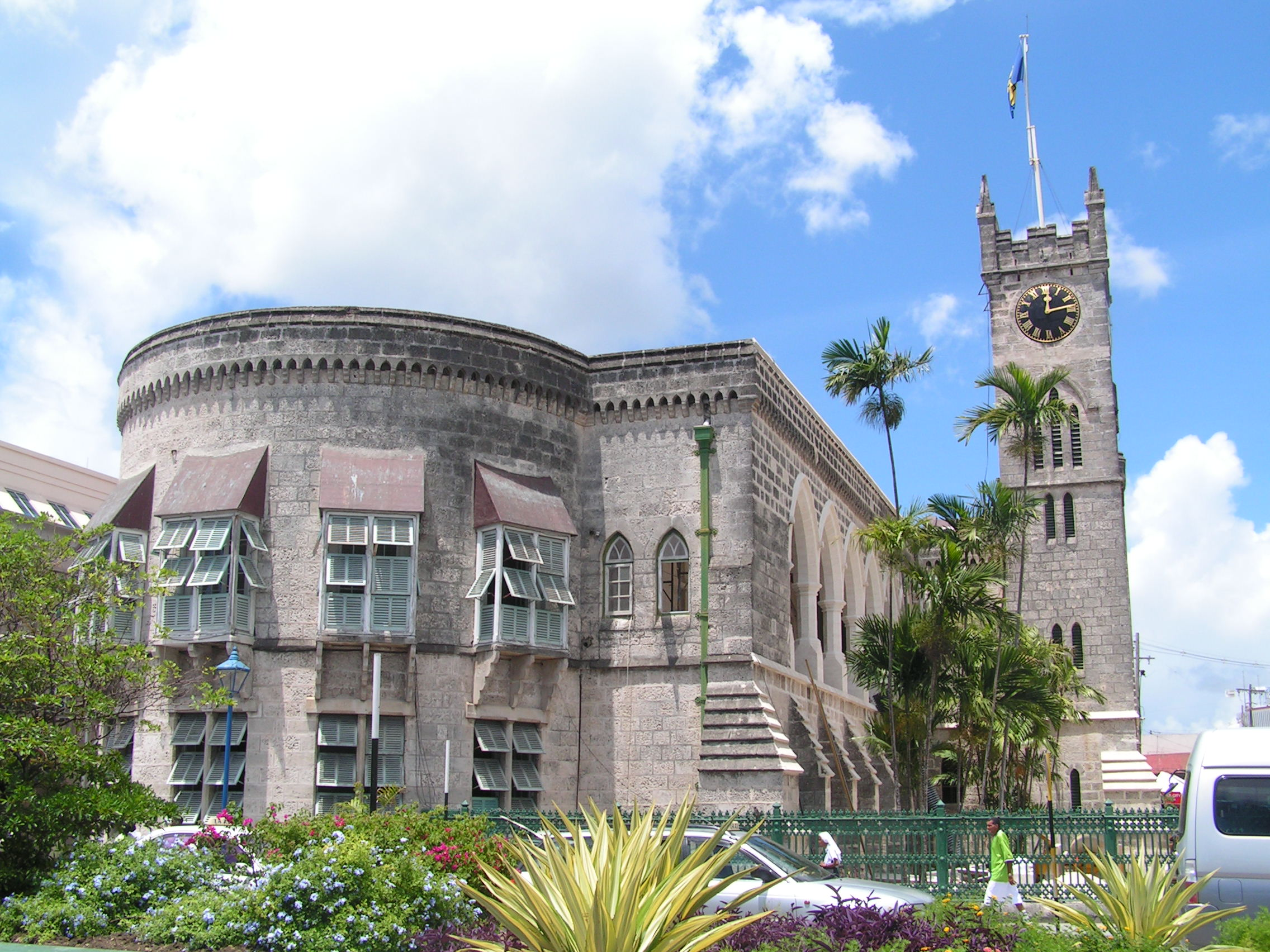
The Parliament of Barbados, in Bridgetown

The president, along with the Senate and the House of Assembly, is one of the three components of parliament. Since the president is almost always required to act on the advice of the cabinet, the president's role in the legislative process is limited to assenting to bills and signing them into law. However, the president has the absolute power to withhold assent to Bills passed by Parliament (i.e. to veto without parliamentary override). Furthermore, a form of pocket veto exists: the Constitution does not give a specific time frame for presidential action on a Bill passed by Parliament, thus the president can hypothetically postpone the signature of a Bill indefinitely, effectively vetoing it. Further, the Constitution outlines that the president is responsible for appointing senators — twelve on the advice of the prime minister, two on the advice of the leader of the opposition, and seven by the president at their discretion to represent various religious, social, economic, or other interests in Barbados.

The president additionally summons, prorogues, and dissolves parliament; after the latter, the writs for a general election are usually dropped by the president at State House. In practice, these powers are almost always exercised on the advice of the cabinet.

=== Judicial powers ===
The president has the right to appoint judges on the joint recommendation of the prime minister and leader of the opposition, and pardon offenders.

== Official oath of office ==
According to the Constitution (Amendment) (No. 2) Act, 2021 and the First Schedule section of the Constitution of Barbados, the official oath of office or affirmation for the president of Barbados is as follows:

I, [name], do swear (solemnly affirm) that I will well and truly serve Barbados in the office of President. (So help me God. (to be omitted in affirmation))

== See also ==
- List of heads of state of Barbados
