= Saint Peter (Barbados Parliament constituency) =

Saint Peter is a constituency in the Saint Peter parish of Barbados. It was established in 1645 as one of the original eleven constituencies. Originally the constituency, like the other original ten, was represented by 2 members until 1971 when the single-member system was introduced. Since 2018, it has been represented in the House of Assembly of the Barbadian Parliament by Colin Jordan. Jordan is a member of the BLP. (Note: As with all constituencies, the constituency elects one member of parliament (MP) by the first past the post system of election at least every five years.)

Since at least the 1951 Barbadian general election, Saint Peter had been considered an electoral strong hold of the BLP who has represented the constituency since then with the exception of a brief period of time between 2014 and 2018 where long-time representative and former prime minister of Barbados Owen Arthur left the party to be an independent.

== History ==
=== Members of Parliament ===
The following list contains the Members of Parliament for the Saint Peter since the introduction of the single-member system in 1971. Owen Arthur won the seat for thirty years starting in 1984. In 1991, 1994 and 1999, while was Prime Minister, he was opposed by Yvonne Walkes who represented the Democratic Labour Party.

Election	Member	Party
1971	Walter Hinds	Barbados Labour Party
1976	Walter Hinds	Barbados Labour Party
1981	Walter Hinds	Barbados Labour Party
1984	Owen Arthur	Barbados Labour Party
1986	Owen Arthur	Barbados Labour Party
1991	Owen Arthur	Barbados Labour Party
1994	Owen Arthur	Barbados Labour Party
1999	Owen Arthur	Barbados Labour Party
2003	Owen Arthur	Barbados Labour Party
2008	Owen Arthur	Barbados Labour Party
2013	Owen Arthur	Barbados Labour Party
2014	Owen Arthur	Independent (Note: Arthur left the BLP and became an independent politician in 2014.)
2018	Colin Jordan	Barbados Labour Party
2022	Colin Jordan	Barbados Labour Party
