= City of Bridgetown (Barbados Parliament constituency) =

Barbados electoral district

- Constituency
- Interactive map of City of Bridgetown
- Coordinates: 13°5′48.45″N 59°36′51.39″W
- Country: Barbados
- Parish: St. Michael
- ISO 3166 code: 3166-2:BB-08

The City of Bridgetown constituency is one of eleven (11) electoral districts in the Parish of St. Michael, and one thirty (30) nationally in Barbados. The Constituency covers a portion of the capital city Bridgetown. The district formed in 1843 is the first electoral district formed after the original eleven in the country. The first representative for the constituency was the national hero the Right Excellent Samuel Jackman Prescod. The member of parliament since 2022 is Corey Lane from the Barbados Labour Party. Before then it was held by Lt.Col. Jeffrey Bostic (Ret.) from 2013. The seat is usually won by a slim margin.

== Area ==
From a point on the western sea coast west of the junction of Highway 7 (the Bridgetown-Oistins Road) with Beckles Road, along a straight line to the junction of Highway 7 with Beckles Road; thence along the middle of Beckles Road to its junction with Old Quarry Avenue; thence along the middle of Old Quarry Avenue to its junction with Bayview Avenue; thence in an easterly direction along the middle of Bayview Avenue to its junction with Water"ll Place; thence in a northerly direction along the middle of Watermill Place to its junction with St.Paul's Avenue; thence in a straight line to the Culloden Farm-Roseneath southern boundary wall; thence in an easterly direction along Culloden Farm-Roseneath boundary wall to its junction with Culloden Road; thence in a northerly direction along the middle of Culloden Road to its junction with Highway 6 (the Bridgetown-Collymore Rock Road); thence in a westerly direction along the middle of Highway 6 to its junction with Martindales Road; thence along the middle of Martindales Road to its junction with Halls Road at the Mencea Cox Round-a-bout; thence along the middle of Halls Road to its junction with Tweedside Road and Roebuck Street at the James A. Tudor Round-a-bout; thence in westerly direction along the middle of Roebuck Street to its junction with Country Road; thence along the middle of Country Road to its junction with White Park Road and Passage Road; thence along the middle of Passage Road to its junction with Baxters Road and Westbury Road; thence in a north westerly direction along the middle of Westbury Road to its junction with President Kennedy Drive; thence in a south westerly direction along the middle of President Kennedy Drive to its junction with Prescod Boulevard and University Row at Elsie Payne Round-a-bout; thence in a northerly direction, then in a westerly, and southerly direction and then in a south easterly direction along the sea coast to a point on the coast west of the junction of Highway 7 with Beckles Road (the starting point).

== Members of Parliament ==
The following list contains the Members of Parliament for the City of Bridgetown since the introduction of the single-member system in 1971.

Election	Member	Party
1971	Elliott Mottley	BLP
1976	Billie Miller	BLP
1981	Billie Miller	BLP
1986	Peter Miller	DLP
1991	Billie Miller	BLP
1994	Billie Miller	BLP
1999	Billie Miller	BLP
2003	Billie Miller	BLP
2008	Pat Todd	DLP
2013	Lt. Col. (Ret.) Jeffrey Bostic	BLP
2018	Lt. Col. (Ret.) Jeffrey Bostic	BLP
2022	Corey Lane	BLP
2026	Michael Lashley	BLP

== See also ==
- Cabinet (Barbados)
- House of Assembly (Barbados)
- List of parliamentary constituencies of Barbados

== Sources ==
- City of Bridgetown, CaribbeanElections.com
- Election results 2003,
