= Christ Church West (Barbados Parliament constituency) =

Christ Church West is a constituency in the Christ Church area of Barbados represented in the House of Assembly of the Barbadian Parliament since 2018 by William Duguid MP of the BLP, who previously represented the constituency between 2003 and 2013. (Note: As with all constituencies, the constituency elects one Member of Parliament (MP) by the first past the post system of election at least every five years.)

Since its founding in 1971 this constituency has been chiefly held by the BLP. For a brief period between 2015 and 2018, this constituency was represented in Parliament by an Independent MP, as the sitting MP, Dr. Maria Agard, who had been elected as a member of the BLP in 2013, was expelled from the Party.

== Boundaries ==
From a point on the southern sea coast south of the junction of the Highway 7 (Hastings-Top Rock Road) with Rendezvous Hill in a straight line to Highway 7; thence in a northerly direction along Rendezvous Hill to its junction with Rendezvous Ridge, then in an easterly direction to the eastern boundary of Rendezvous Ridge Development, then in a northerly direction to the ABC Highway, thence across the ABC Highway to a point south of the western boundary of Tino Terrace (at Lot #29); thence in a northerly direction along the western boundary of Tino Terrace and Warners Gardens (Lot #53); thence in an easterly direction along Warners Gardens northern boundary to a point where it meets the southern terminus of Brownes Road (at Lot #76) thence in northerly direction along the Brownes Road-Sargeants Village Tenantry Road to the junction with Highway 6 (the Sargeants Village Road); thence in a westerly direction along the middle of the Sargeants Village Road to its junction with the Errol Barrow Highway at the Garfield Sobers Round-a-bout; thence in a westerly direction along the middle of the Errol Barrow Highway to its junction with Highway 6 (Collymore Rock-Sargeants Village Road); thence in a westerly direction along the middle of Highway 6 to its junction with Clapham Park Road thence along the middle of the Clapham Park Road to its junction with Clapham Road; thence in a westerly direction along the middle of Clapham Road to its junction with Observatory Road; thence in a south westerly direction along the middle of Observatory Road to its junction with Fordes Road; thence in a westerly direction, along the middle of Fordes Road to its junction with Brittons New Road; thence ip a westerly direction along the middle of Brittons New Road to its junction with Reservoir Road; thence in a southerly direction along the middle of Reservoir Road to the Ridge and using an imaginary line continue over and beyond the Ridge to the 1st Ave Dayrell's Road; thence southerly along the middle of 1st Avenue Dayrells Road to its junction with Dayrells Road; thence in a westerly direction along the middle of Dayrells Road to its junction with the Garrison Road; thence in a south westerly direction along the middle of the Garrison Road to its junction with Highway 7; then directly across Highway 7 and continuing in a south westerly direction along the road leading to Gravesend Beach and directly to the sea; thence in an easterly direction along the sea coast to a point on the coast south of the junction of Rendezvous Hill with Highway 7 the starting point).

== History ==
=== Members of Parliament ===
Election	Member	Party
1971	Henry de Boulay Forde	BLP
1976	Henry de Boulay Forde	BLP
1981	Henry de Boulay Forde	BLP
1986	Henry de Boulay Forde	BLP
1991	Henry de Boulay Forde	BLP
1994	Henry de Boulay Forde	BLP
1999	Henry de Boulay Forde	BLP
2003	William Fondleroy Duguid	BLP
2008	William Fondleroy Duguid	BLP
2013	Maria Agard	Independent (Note: Maria Agard was elected on a BLP ticket, but was expelled from the Barbados Labour Party in 2015)
2018	William Fondleroy Duguid	BLP
2022	William Fondleroy Duguid	BLP
