= Henry de Boulay Forde =

Barbadian politician (1933–2024)

Sir Henry de Boulay Forde KC
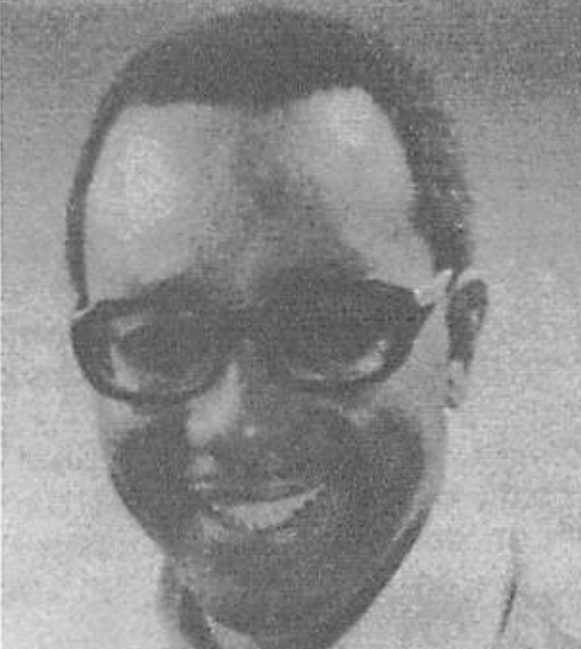
- Forde in 1976

Leader of the Opposition
- In office 1986–1989
- Prime Minister: Errol Barrow; Lloyd Erskine Sandiford
- Preceded by: Errol Barrow
- Succeeded by: Richard Christopher Haynes
- In office 22 January 1991 – 1 August 1993
- Prime Minister: Lloyd Erskine Sandiford
- Preceded by: Richard Christopher Haynes
- Succeeded by: Owen Arthur

Attorney-General of Barbados
- In office 1976–1981
- Preceded by: George Moe
- Succeeded by: Louis Tull

Minister of External Affairs
- In office 1976–1981
- Prime Minister: Tom Adams
- Preceded by: George Moe
- Succeeded by: Louis Tull

Member of Parliament for Christ Church West
- In office 9 September 1971 – 1999
- Preceded by: Constituency created
- Succeeded by: William F. Duguid

Personal details
- Born: 20 March 1933 Christ Church, Colony of Barbados
- Died: 15 October 2024 (aged 91) Barbados
- Party: Barbados Labour Party

Sir Henry de Boulay Forde (20 March 1933 – 15 October 2024) was a Barbadian politician and lawyer who served as the Leader of the Opposition from 1986 to 1989 and from 1991 to 1993. He also served as leader of the Barbados Labour Party from 1986 to 1993 and as the Attorney-General of Barbados from 1976 to 1981.

== Early life ==
Henry de Boulay Forde was born on 20 March 1933 on Water Street, Christ Church, Barbados to a working class family and attended Christ Church Boys’ Foundation School for the start of his secondary education, from which he won a scholarship to Harrison College, the premier boys' secondary school of the island, from which he won the Barbados Scholarship in Classics which took him to Christ's College, Cambridge University for his law degree. He dined at the Middle Temple and was admitted to the British and Barbadian Bar in 1959.

== Political career ==
Forde began his political career in the 1960s, having a hand in negotiations that led to Barbados's independence in 1966. He won the Christ Church West seat in 1971, a seat he would hold for the next 30 years until 2003. He would then be appointed Minister of External Affairs and Attorney-General of Barbados in 1976, serving until 1981 in the Tom Adams administration. After Tom Adams' death, and Bernard St. John's premiership ended with the 1986 Barbadian general election he would assume leadership of the BLP in 1986 and the position as Leader of the Opposition until 1989 when Richard Christopher Haynes broke away from the then in-power Democratic Labour Party with some other DLP members, forming the National Democratic Party which became the second largest party in the House of Assembly of Barbados making Haynes the new leader of the opposition. After the 1991 Barbadian general election he would then again become opposition leader until 1993, stepping down as BLP leader due to poor health. Owen Arthur then succeeded him as party leader who would then go on to win the 1994 Barbadian general election.

In 1996, Forde would chair the commission inquiry, the Constitution Review Commission which reviewed the Constitution of Barbados in regards to preparing for Barbados to become a republic. The commission held public hearings in Barbados and overseas. The commission reported back on 15 December 1998, and submitted its report to the then Governor-General, Sir Clifford Husbands. A referendum Bill was introduced in Parliament and had its first reading on 10 October 2000. With the dissolution of Parliament just prior to the elections in 2003, the Referendum Bill was not carried over. Forde would later retire from politics in 1999 but continued to practice law.

== Death ==
Forde died on 15 October 2024, at the age of 91.
