= 1978 St. Michael South Central by-election =

Parliamentary by-election in Barbados in 1978

- 6 July 1978
- Turnout: 67.5%

Candidate	Richard Christopher Haynes	Charles Hinds
Party	DLP	BLP
Popular vote	2,604	1,367
Percentage	64.74%	33.99%
MP before election
Frederick Smith
DLP
Elected MP
Richard Christopher Haynes
DLP

A by-election was held in the Barbadian constituency of the St. Michael South Central on 6 July 1978 after the resignation of Democratic Labour Party member Frederick Smith who was the representative of the constituency in the House of Assembly of Barbados.

== Previous election ==
1976 general election: Saint Michael South Central
Candidate	Party	Votes	%
Frederick Smith	Democratic Labour Party	1,615	49.68
Charles Hinds	Barbados Labour Party	1,595	49.06
Grafton Clarke	Independent	41	1.26
Total		3,251	100.00
Valid votes		3,251	99.27
Invalid/blank votes		24	0.73
Total votes		3,275	100.00
Registered voters/turnout		4,759	68.82
Source: Caribbean Elections, Barbados Electoral and Boundaries Commission

== Result ==
Richard Christopher Haynes won the election. Turnout was 67.5%.

Candidate	Party	Votes	%
Richard Christopher Haynes	Democratic Labour Party	2,604	64.74
Charles Hinds	Barbados Labour Party	1,367	33.99
Carl Haddock	Independent	51	1.27
Total		4,022	100.00
Valid votes		4,022	97.95
Invalid/blank votes		84	2.05
Total votes		4,106	100.00
Registered voters/turnout		6,086	67.47
DLP hold			
Source: Barbados Electoral and Boundaries Commission

== See also ==
- 1976 Barbadian general election
- List of parliamentary constituencies of Barbados
