= Richard Christopher Haynes =

Barbadian politician

Sir Richard Christopher Haynes FRCP KA

Leader of the Opposition
- In office 1989 – 22 January 1991
- Prime Minister: Lloyd Erskine Sandiford
- Preceded by: Henry deBoulay Forde
- Succeeded by: Henry deBoulay Forde

Minister of Finance
- In office 1986–1987
- Preceded by: Harold Bernard St. John
- Succeeded by: Lloyd Erskine Sandiford

Member of Parliament for St. Michael South Central
- In office 6 July 1978 – 22 January 1991
- Preceded by: Frederick Smith
- Succeeded by: David Bowen
- In office 6 September 1994 – 1998
- Preceded by: David Bowen
- Succeeded by: David Gill

Personal details
- Born: 10 June 1936 Newbury, St. George, Barbados
- Died: 23 June 2013 (aged 77) Queen Elizabeth Hospital, St. Michael, Barbados
- Party: National Democratic Party (1989-1998)
- Other political affiliations: Democratic Labour Party (1978–1989)

Sir Richard Christopher Haynes (10 June 1936 – 23 June 2013), also known as Richie Haynes, was a Barbadian politician and surgeon who served as the Leader of the Opposition from 1989 to 1991 after he left the ruling Democratic Labour Party and formed the National Democratic Party. He also served as Minister of Finance from 1986 to 1987. He was married to Jamaican-Barbadian senator Carol Lady Haynes.

== Early life ==
Richard Haynes was born on 10 June 1936 in Newbury, St. George in pre-independence Barbados. He went to school at Workman’s Junior School for his primary education and for his secondary education he attended St. George’s Boys School. He began to study medicine and attended the University of Edinburgh in Scotland for his tertiary education in 1963, where he earned a degree and returned home to Barbados to become the Head of the Department of Medicine as Senior Physician Specialist and the Chief of Medical Staff at the Queen Elizabeth Hospital (QEH). There he pioneered the development of Intensive Care Unit (ICU) at QEH and transformed QEH into a hospital suitable to facilitate tertiary education for medical students during his tenure until from 1967 to 1976. He also opened up a medical practice in 1972, co-founding the Delaware Medical Centre.

== Political career ==
Haynes began his tenure in politics by running as a candidate for the Democratic Labour Party for the 1978 St. Michael South Central by-election which was triggered after the resignation of DLP member Frederick Smith. Haynes won the election and retained the seat for the DLP, a seat he would hold until 1998 with a brief interregnum between 1991 and 1994. As a member of parliament, Haynes remained in the opposition until the DLP retook the government in the 1986 general elections. He was subsequently given the position of Minister of Finance which he held between 1986 and 1987. After the death of Prime Minister Errol Barrow in 1986, the premiership passed to Lloyd Erskine Sandiford and the cabinet was reshuffled in 1987, and the portfolio of Finance was placed under Sandiford's purview leaving Haynes as a backbencher. In 1989 Haynes and three other DLP members defected from the party, dissatisfied with Sandiford, and formed the National Democratic Party. This made them the second largest party in the house and Haynes, as the leader of the party, became the opposition leader. He lost the role after the 1991 general elections in which the NDP lost all of their seats. After the vote of no-confidence of Sandiford succeeded and triggered the 1994 Barbadian general election, Haynes was able to reclaim his seat and the NDP captured 13% of the popular vote. This would mark the most recent time a party that was not the DLP or the BLP would win a seat in a general election. Haynes then later retired from elective politics in 1998 and the NDP was dissolved.

== Later life and death ==
Later in 1998 he chaired what was known as the Haynes commission as Chairman of the Advisory Commission of Enquiry into the QEH. Haynes would later receive the national award of the Knight of St Andrew in 2003 as recognition for his contributions to Barbados in the field of health care. Haynes died on 23 June 2013 at age 77 from throat cancer.
