= List of parliamentary constituencies of Barbados =

This is a list of the 30 constituencies currently represented in the Parliament of Barbados, as at the February 2013 general election. From 1971, each constituency has been represented by a single Member of Parliament (MP). The number of seats were increased from 28 to 30 just ahead of the 2003 elections.

== History ==
After Barbados was settled by the Kingdom of England, a House of Burgesses was established to conduct the business of governance in the colony along with the Governor. From an early date, if not the beginning, there were two members of the House of Assembly for each parish; in 1843 two members were added for Bridgetown, bringing the total to 24 Members. In 1971 dual representatives for each constituency were abolished in favour of single seat ridings and the entire island was divided into 24 constituencies. In 1981 three more constituencies were created; thus bring the total to 27. By the election of 1991 a 28th was added, and finally ahead of the 2003 general election two more were added bringing the national total to 30. As of 2011 the Electoral and Boundaries Commission decided that no new constituencies would be needed. However, there was a subsequent call made by the media that St. Philip-South's population was now too large and was disproportionate to all other constituencies. Despite the call, Barbados held the 2013 elections without adding any new constituencies.

== List of constituencies ==
List of constituencies
Name	Created
City of Bridgetown	1843
Christ Church East	1971
Christ Church East Central	1981
Christ Church South	1991
Christ Church West	1971
Christ Church West Central	1981
St. Andrew	Original
St. George North	1971
St. George South	1971
St. James Central	2003
St. James North	1981
St. James South	1981
St. Lucy	Original
St. Michael Central	1971
St. Michael East	1981
St. Michael South	1971
St. Michael South Central	1971
St. Michael South East	1971
St. Michael North	1971
St. Michael North East	1971
St. Michael North West	1971
St. Michael West	1971
St. Michael West Central	1981
St. Peter	Original
St. Philip North	1971
St. Philip South	1971
St. Philip West	2003
St. John	Original
St. Joseph	Original
St. Thomas	Original

== See also ==
- Electoral calendar
- Electoral system
- List of electoral districts by nation
- Electoral and Boundaries Commission
