= Lloyd Erskine Sandiford =

Prime Minister of Barbados from 1987 to 1994

The Right Honourable Sir Lloyd Erskine Sandiford KA, PC
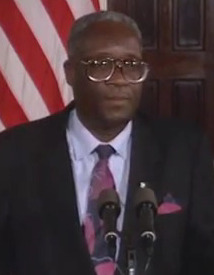
- Sandiford in 1993

4th Prime Minister of Barbados
- In office 1 June 1987 – 6 September 1994
- Monarch: Elizabeth II
- Governors-General: Hugh Springer; Nita Barrow
- Deputy: Philip Greaves
- Preceded by: Errol Barrow
- Succeeded by: Owen Arthur

4th Deputy Prime Minister of Barbados
- In office 3 June 1986 – 1 June 1987
- Prime Minister: Errol Barrow
- Preceded by: Harold Bernard St. John
- Succeeded by: Philip Greaves

Personal details
- Born: 24 March 1937 British Windward Islands (now Barbados)
- Died: 26 June 2023 (aged 86) Bridgetown, Barbados
- Party: Democratic Labour Party
- Spouse: Angelita Sandiford
- Profession: Economics Lecturer

Sir Lloyd Erskine Sandiford, KA, PC (24 March 1937 – 26 June 2023) was a Barbadian politician. He served as the fourth prime minister of Barbados from 1987 to 1994, and later served as Barbados' first resident ambassador in Beijing, China, from 2010 to 2013.

== Biography ==
Sandiford was born on 24 March 1937 in Barbados and educated at the Coleridge and Parry School, Harrison College and the University of the West Indies in Jamaica, where he received his Bachelor of Arts in English. He then studied at Britain's University of Manchester, receiving his Master's degree in economics and social studies. Sandiford returned to Barbados, where he joined the Democratic Labour Party (DLP). In 1967, one year after independence, he was appointed to the Senate. Sandiford left the Senate to run in the 1971 election, in which he won a seat in the House of Assembly. The DLP, under Errol Barrow, formed the government; Sandiford served in many cabinet positions including as minister of education. The DLP lost the 1976 election to the Barbados Labour Party (BLP) and formed the opposition.

Sandiford took part in the U.S. Department of State's 1976 International Visitor Leadership Program.

In 1986, the DLP was again voted into power, with Sandiford defeating BLP MP Lionel Seymour Craig in the Saint Michael South constituency. Sandiford was made deputy prime minister and minister of education under Barrow in 1986. In 1987, Barrow died unexpectedly and Sandiford was appointed prime minister. He led the DLP to victory in the 1991 elections. He also held the additional portfolio of minister of finance. In 1994 Sandiford narrowly lost a no confidence motion brought against him by the opposition when a number of members of his own party broke ranks and voted in support of the motion. Sandiford then called elections for 1994, two years before they were constitutionally due, but lost to the BLP led by Owen Arthur. He remained in parliament until 1999 when he focused on being a tutor at the Barbados Community College, where he taught economics and Caribbean politics.

In 2000, Sandiford was conferred the highest honour in Barbados; he was made a Knight of St. Andrew (KA) of the Order of Barbados. In April 2008, under Prime Minister David Thompson, a resolution was brought to the Parliament of Barbados that the Sherbourne Conference Centre – which was Sir Lloyd's idea and brainchild – be renamed the Sir Lloyd Erskine Sandiford Conference Centre.

Sandiford was later appointed Barbadian Ambassador to China, presenting his credentials on 3 March 2010.

== Personal life and death ==
Sandiford's wife Angelita, Lady Sandiford, is a psychologist and educator. They had one son and two daughters.

Lloyd Erskine Sandiford died on 26 June 2023, at the age of 86.

== Honours and memberships ==
Co-chair of The Summit Council for World Peace, Washington, D.C. – 2011

- LL.D (Hon.) University of the West Indies – 2009
- LL.D (Hon.) Barbados Community College – 2004
- Knight of St. Andrew – 2000
- Member of Her Majesty's Privy Council – 1989
- Member of the Privy Council of the United Kingdom – 1989
- Order of the Liberator, Venezuela – 1987
- Member of the Council of Freely Elected Presidents and Prime Ministers, Carter Centre, Atlanta, USA
- Life Member Commonwealth Parliamentary Association

== Publications ==
Sandiford was the author of the book The Essence of Economics: An Introductory Text (1998), and several poems, including "Ode to the Environment" and "When She Leaves You". Seven volumes of his speeches have been published. He has written many articles, and contributed a chapter entitled "The Role of the Private Sector in the Structural Adjustment Process" in the book Business, Government and Society, edited by Monya Anyadike-Danes, Eastern Caribbean Consultants, Barbados (1994). He also wrote the book Politics and Society in Barbados and the Caribbean: An Introduction (Cassia Publishing Ltd, 2000) and Fighting for the Just Society: An Autobiographical Note (2011).

Political offices
Preceded by Errol Barrow	Prime Minister of Barbados; 1987–1994	Succeeded by Owen Arthur
Preceded by Richie Haynes	Minister of Finance of Barbados; 1987–1993	Succeeded by David Thompson
