= Saint Michael North East (Barbados Parliament constituency) =

Parliamentary constituency in Barbados

- Constituency for the House of Assembly of Barbados
- Region: Saint Michael, Barbados

Current constituency
- Created: 1971

Saint Michael North East is a constituency in the Saint Michael parish of Barbados. It was established in 1971. Since 1994, it has been represented in the House of Assembly of the Barbadian Parliament by Mia Mottley, leader of the Barbados Labour Party and Prime Minister since 2018. (Note: As with all constituencies, the constituency elects one member of parliament (MP) by the first past the post system of election at least every five years.) The Saint Michael North East constituency is a safe seat for the BLP.

== Boundaries ==
The constituency runs:

From the junction of Spooners Hill with Accommodation Road in a south easterly, easterly and south easterly direction along the middle of Accommodation Road to its junction with 2nd Avenue Promenade Road; thence along the middle of 2nd Avenue Promenade Road to its junction with Military Road; thence in a south easterly direction along the middle of Military Road to its junction with Highway 2 (the Bank Hall Main Road); thence in a north easterly direction along the middle of Highway 2 to its junction with Waterford Cross Road; thence in an easterly direction along the middle of Waterford Cross Road to its junction with Highway 3 (the Station Hill-Dayrells Hill Road); thence in a northerly direction along the middle of Highway 3 to its junction with Cole Hole at Bourne’s Village; thence in a northerly direction along this road to the culvert where it crosses a gully; thence along this gully in a south westerly, north westerly and north easterly direction to a point opposite Applewhaites Tenantry Road, thence along the line joining this point to the road junction and in a north westerly direction along Applewhaites Tenantry Road to its junction with a public road called Highway E (the Hothersal Turning-Bibbys Lane Road); thence in a south westerly direction along the middle of Highway E to its junction with the Canewood-Jackson Road; thence in a westerly direction along the middle of Canewood-Jackson Road to its junction with Highway 2 (Jackson Spooners Hill Road); thence in a southerly direction along the middle of Jackson-Spooners Hill Road to its junction with 4th Avenue Green Hill Road; thence in a north westerly direction along the middle of 4th Avenue Green Hill Road to its junction with 2nd Avenue Green Hill Road; thence in a southerly direction along 2nd Avenue Green Hill Road to its junction with Johnson Land Tenantry Road; thence in a northerly and south westerly direction along the middle of Johnson Land Tenantry Road to its junction with Whitehall Tenantry Road; thence in a westerly direction along the middle of Whitehall Tenantry Road to its junction with Whitehall No.1 Road; thence in a south westerly direction along the middle of Whitehall No. 1 Road to its junction with Whitehall-Cave Hill Road; thence in a north westerly direction along the middle of Whitehall-Cave Hill Road to a point north of the flight of steps terminating in Rockhampton Road; then along this flight of steps to Rockhampton Road; thence in an easterly and then southerly direction along the middle of Rockhampton Road to its junction with Brecon Road; thence in an easterly direction along the middle of Brecon Road to its junction with Long Gap; thence in an easterly direction along the middle of Long Gap to its junction with the Spooners Hill Road; thence in a southerly direction along the middle of Spooners Hill Road to its junction with Accommodation Road (the starting point).

== Members ==
Election	Member	Party
2018	Mia Mottley	BLP
2022	Mia Mottley	BLP
2026	Mia Mottley	BLP

== Elections ==
=== 2026 ===
St. Michael North East
Party	Candidate	Votes	%	±%
BLP	Mia Mottley	3,560	87.90	+1.9
DLP	Damien Griffith	391	9.65	−3.05
BSP	Clerene Howard	99	2.44	New
Majority		3,169	78.25	+4.95
Turnout		4,050		
BLP hold		Swing	+1.9	

=== 2022 ===
St. Michael North East
Party	Candidate	Votes	%	±%
BLP	Mia Mottley	3,216	86.0	−1.2
DLP	Damien Griffith	476	12.7	+3.1
BFP	Roy Turney	48	1.3	+0.6
Majority		2,740	73.3	−4.3
Turnout		3,740		
BLP hold		Swing	-2.1	

=== 2018 ===
St. Michael North East
Party	Candidate	Votes	%	±%
BLP	Mia Mottley	4,553	87.2	+18.3
DLP	Patrick Todd	500	9.6	−21.5
SB	Kemar Stuart	133	2.5	New
Bajan Free Party	Enlou Frere	37	0.7	New
Majority		4,053	77.6	+39.8
Turnout		5,223		
BLP hold		Swing	+19.9	
