= Mia Mottley =

Prime Minister of Barbados since 2018

The Honourable Mia Mottley SC MP
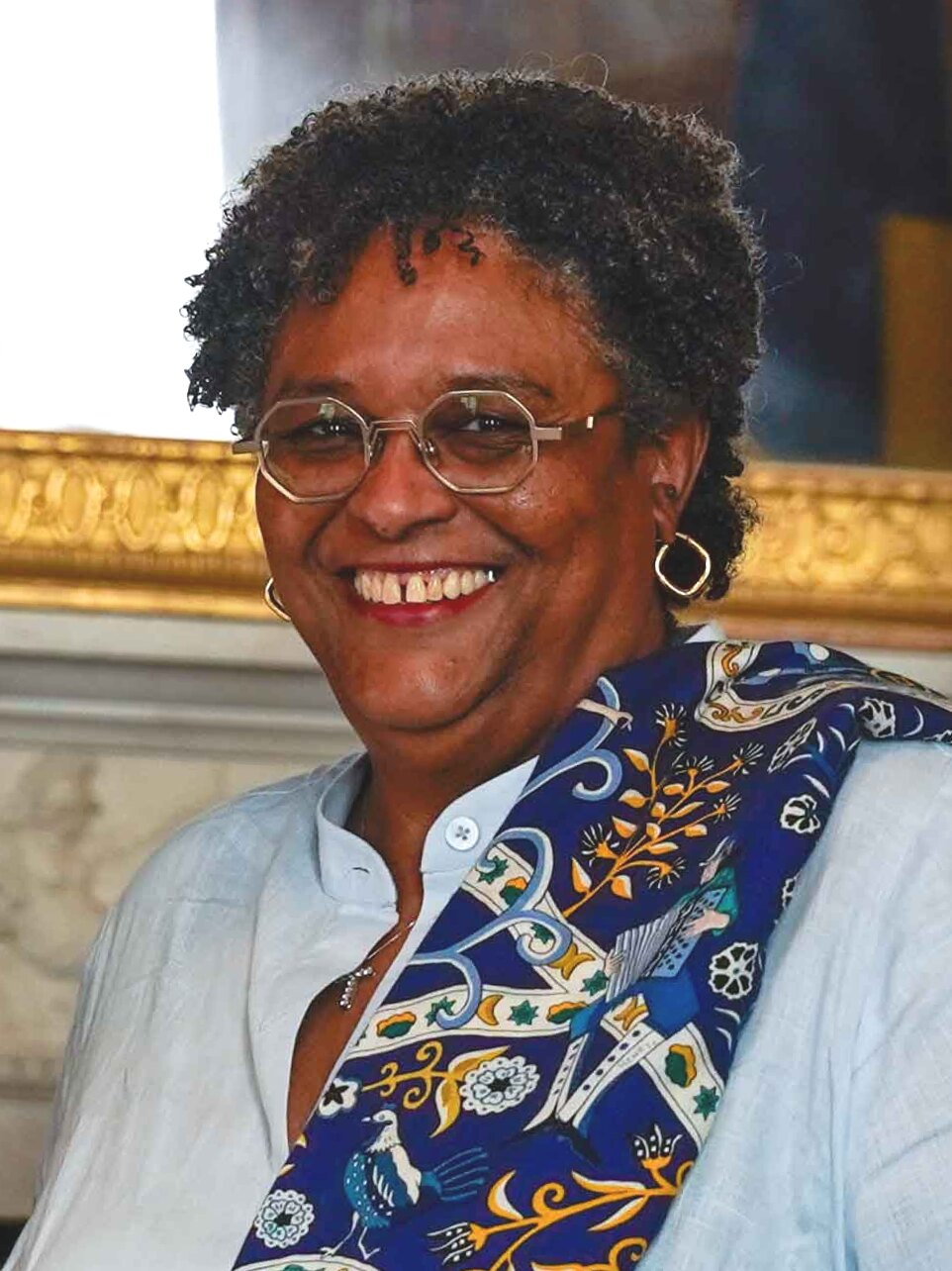
- Mottley in 2026

8th Prime Minister of Barbados
- Incumbent
- Assumed office 25 May 2018
- Monarch: Elizabeth II (until 2021)
- President: Sandra Mason; Jeffrey Bostic
- Governor-General: Sandra Mason (until 2021)
- Deputy: Santia Bradshaw (since 2022)
- Preceded by: Freundel Stuart

7th Deputy Prime Minister of Barbados
- In office 26 May 2003 – 15 January 2008
- Prime Minister: Owen Arthur
- Preceded by: Billie Miller
- Succeeded by: Freundel Stuart

Leader of the Opposition
- In office 26 February 2013 – 25 May 2018
- Prime Minister: Freundel Stuart
- Preceded by: Owen Arthur
- Succeeded by: Joseph Atherley
- In office 7 February 2008 – 18 October 2010
- Prime Minister: David Thompson
- Preceded by: David Thompson
- Succeeded by: Owen Arthur

Member of Parliament for Saint Michael North East
- Incumbent
- Assumed office 6 September 1994
- Preceded by: Leroy Brathwaite
- Majority: 3,243 (62.1%)

Chairwoman of the Caribbean Community
- In office 1 January 2025 – 30 June 2025
- Preceded by: Dickon Mitchell
- Succeeded by: Andrew Holness

Personal details
- Born: 1 October 1965 (age 61) Bridgetown, Barbados
- Party: BLP
- Relations: Eva Mottley (cousin)
- Education: Merrivale Preparatory School; United Nations International School; Queen's College (Barbados); London School of Economics (LLB)
- Occupation: Politician and lawyer
- Mia Mottley's voice Mia Mottley speaks on cooperation between Barbados and the United States; Recorded 13 October 2021

Mia Amor Mottley (born 1 October 1965) is a Barbadian politician and lawyer who has served as the eighth prime minister of Barbados since 2018 and as Leader of the Barbados Labour Party (BLP) since 2008. Mottley is the first woman to hold both positions. Having overseen the abolition of the Barbadian monarchy, she is the first prime minister of the Barbadian republic.

Mottley has been the Member of Parliament for the constituency of Saint Michael North East since 1994. From 1994 to 2008, she held a succession of ministerial portfolios, including the post of Attorney-General of Barbados, becoming the first woman to be so appointed.

Mottley was twice the Leader of the Opposition in the House of Assembly of Barbados; first from 2008 to 2010, then from 2013 to 2018. In 2018, her party won a historic landslide victory in the 24 May general election, securing all 30 seats in the House and 72.8% of the popular vote in the most successful election performance in Barbadian political history. In the 2022 general election, the BLP again won all 30 seats in the legislature. Mottley won a third term in the 2026 general election, with her party claiming all 30 seats for a third consecutive landslide victory.

== Early life, family and education ==
Mottley was born in Bridgetown and is the granddaughter of Ernest Deighton Mottley (1907–1973), a real estate broker and successful politician particularly at the parish level. He was the first Mayor of Bridgetown (1959), representing Bridgetown in the House of Assembly from 1946, who belonged to the conservative Barbados National Party. He was granted the Ordinary Commander of the Civil Division for public services in Barbados in June 1962 and assisted Wynter Algernon Crawford (1910–1993), Barbados's Trade Minister, at the Independent Conference in London during June and July 1966.

Mottley's uncle, also named Ernest Deighton Mottley, became the political leader of the short-lived Christian Social Democratic Party (CSD) created in March 1975. Her cousin was the actress Eva Mottley.

Mia's father Sir Elliott Deighton Mottley KCMG KC was a barrister who sat in the House of Assembly for a relatively short time, vacating the seat to become consul-general in New York. He was educated at Eagle Hall School, Harrison College, Middle Temple and the Inns of Court School of Law. He once served as Bermuda's attorney-general and sits on the Court of Appeal of Belize. He married Mia's mother Santa Amor Tappin in December 1964, three years after being called to the Bar, and was elected to represent Bridgetown in May 1969.

Mia Mottley was educated at Merrivale Preparatory School, the United Nations International School, and Queen's College (Barbados). She later studied at the London School of Economics and was awarded a law degree from the University of London in 1986.

== Political career ==
Mottley first entered Barbadian politics in 1991, when she lost an election race in St. Michael North East against Leroy Brathwaite (a defeat of fewer than 200 votes). Between 1991 and 1994, she was one of two Opposition Senators in the Upper House, Senate of Barbados, where she was Shadow Minister of Culture and Community Development. During that time, she served on numerous Parliamentary Joint Select Committees on areas including Praedial Larceny and Domestic Violence.

Following the BLP's victory in the 1994 Barbadian general election, Mottley was appointed the minister of education, youth affairs and culture in September 1994, under Prime Minister Owen Arthur. At the age of 29, she was one of the youngest Barbadians to be assigned a ministerial portfolio. During her tenure, she co-authored the White Paper on Education entitled Each Child Matters, which draws the link between better education and job fulfilment.

She was elected general secretary of the Barbados Labour Party in 1996. In that year and again in 1997, she was Chairwoman of the Caricom Standing Committee of Ministers of Education.

Mottley was appointed Attorney-General of Barbados and Minister of Home Affairs in August 2001 and is the first female (in Barbados) to hold this position. She is also the youngest ever Queen's Counsel in Barbados. In addition to being a Member of the Privy Council of Barbados, she was the Leader of the House and a member of the National Security Council and the Barbados Defence Board. She is also credited with helping the Education Sector Enhancement Programme, popularly known as "EduTech", which aims to increase the number of young people contributing to the island's development.

In Youth Affairs, Mottley directed the establishment of the Youth Entrepreneurship Scheme and a National Youth Development Programme.

Two years later, Mottley became the second female deputy prime minister and chairman of the Social Council of Barbados and the deputy chairman of Barbados's Economic Council. She held the chairmanship of a number of key Cabinet sub-committees, notably on Telecommunications Reform and on oversight of the administrative and legislative initiatives to prepare Barbados for the advent of the Caribbean Single Market and Economy.

In a government reshuffle in February 2006, Mottley was appointed minister of economic affairs and development, a post she also held until 2008, where her responsibilities put her in charge of key economic agencies.

Following the BLP's defeat in the 2008 Barbadian general election held on 15 January 2008, and Owen Arthur's resignation as party leader, Mia Mottley was elected as BLP party leader in a leadership election on 19 January 2008 against former Attorney-General of Barbados, Dale Marshall (politician). She is the first woman to lead the party, as well as the country's first female opposition leader. Mottley was sworn in as opposition leader on 7 February 2008. She promised the people that the Barbados Labour Party would be a strong and unified Opposition that would fight for the rights of all citizens in the country.

On 18 October 2010, Mottley was ousted as Leader of the Opposition following a vote of no-confidence by five of her parliamentary colleagues. The group of MPs placed their support behind former prime minister Owen Arthur, who assumed the leadership position that same day after another leadership election in which he defeated Mia Mottley.

In the February 2013 general election, the BLP was narrowly defeated, obtaining 14 seats against 16 for the Democratic Labour Party (DLP). A few days after the election, on 26 February 2013, the BLP parliamentary group elected Mottley as Leader of the Opposition, replacing Arthur.

=== Premiership ===
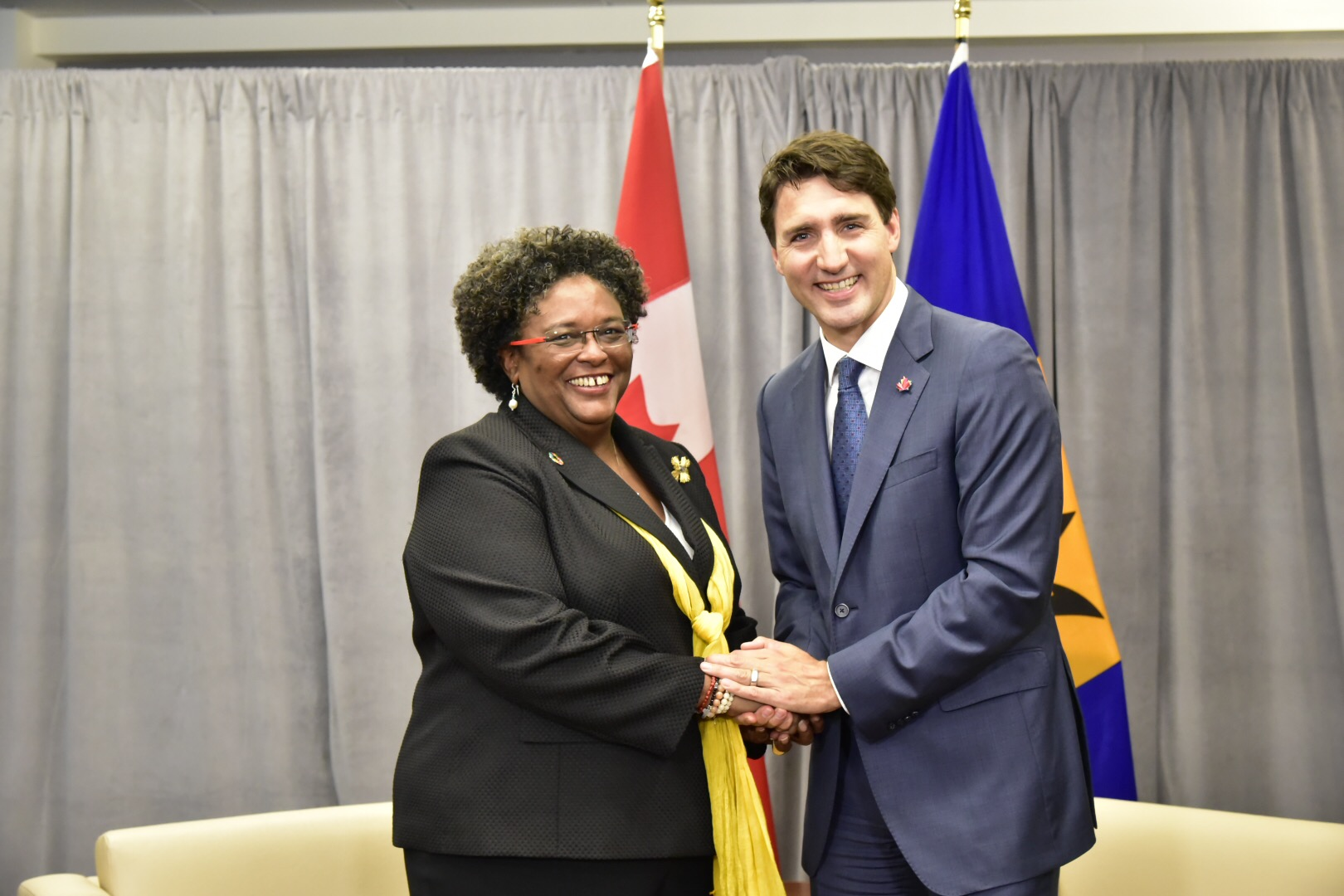
Mottley with Canadian Prime Minister Justin Trudeau, 24 September 2018

In the 24 May 2018 general election, the BLP won the biggest majority government in Barbadian history, winning 72.8% of the popular vote and all 30 seats in the legislature. Mottley was sworn in as Barbados's first female prime minister on 25 May 2018. Since assuming office, she has concurrently held the role of Minister of Finance.

A week after the elections, Joseph Atherley, MP for St. Michael West, left the BLP to become the House of Assembly's sole opposition member, citing concerns about a one-party legislature. He was subsequently appointed Leader of the Opposition.

In May 2018, Mottley disclosed previously uncovered financial obligations of the state, saying that the new government inherited a large debt. Disclosure of information about the current level of debt led to an increase in the debt-to-GDP ratio from 137 per cent to 175 per cent — the fourth-highest value in the world after Japan, Greece, and Sudan. Mottley announced that new government had no other choice than to ask the IMF to facilitate debt restructuring. A week later, following the election, on 5 June 2018 Barbados failed to fulfil its obligation to pay the 26th coupon on Eurobonds maturing in 2035. This was the first time in history that a sitting government did not fulfil its obligation.

In the 2019 New Year Honours, Mottley's father Elliott received a knighthood on the nomination of the Barbadian government.

Mottley addressed the United Nations General Assembly in New York on 27 September 2019 with a 39-minute speech centred on climate change and its effects on Barbados and other Caribbean nations.

In 2020, Mottley served as the Chairperson of the Caribbean Community (CARICOM) bloc, a rotating position held for six months.

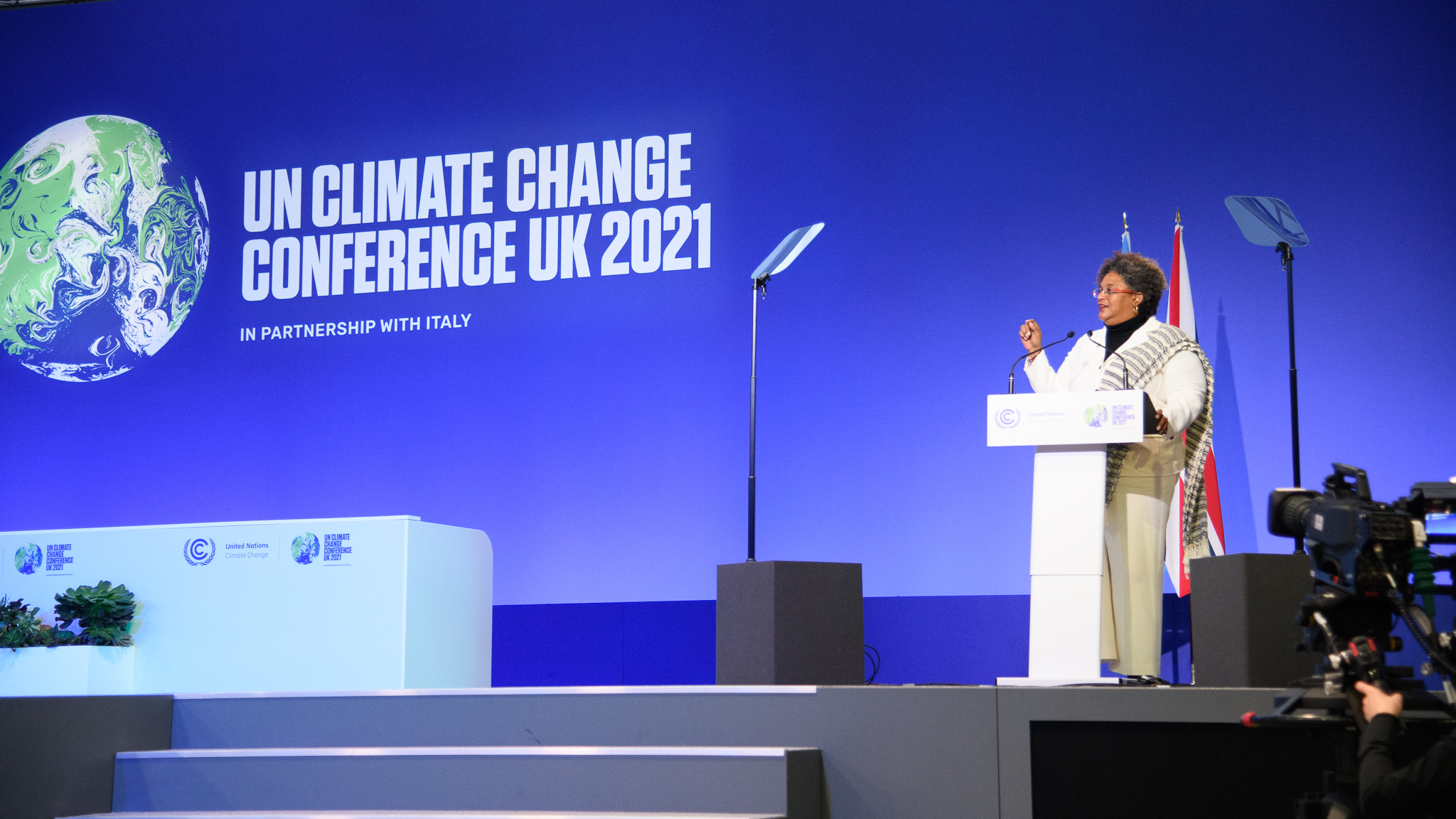
Mottley at the opening ceremony of the COP26 climate summit in Glasgow on 1 November 2021

In the 2020 Throne Speech, Mottley's government announced a plan to abolish the Barbadian monarchy, removing the Queen of Barbados, Elizabeth II, as the country's sovereign and head of state, making Barbados a republic. She argued that after more than 54 years of independence, it was time for Barbados to "fully leave our colonial past behind". Under her proposal, the country would retain its Westminster-derived system and become a parliamentary republic, with a mostly ceremonial president as head of state, intending to complete the process by November for the 55th anniversary of the country's independence. On 27 July 2021, Mottley announced that her cabinet had decided that the country would complete its transition to a parliamentary republic by 30 November. Legislation amending the Constitution was enacted by the Parliament of Barbados in October. The decision to enact constitutional changes without a referendum faced some criticism; a University of the West Indies (UWI) poll found that, although only a minority wanted to retain the Barbadian monarch as head of state, most objected to the lack of consultation.

On 12 October 2021, the incumbent governor-general, Dame Sandra Mason, was jointly nominated by Mottley and Leader of the Opposition Joseph Atherley as the country's first president, and was subsequently elected on 20 October. Mason took office on 30 November 2021 in a ceremony also attended by the then-Prince of Wales.

Mottley addressed the United Nations General Assembly in New York on 24 September 2021 with a short speech to support UN Secretary-General António Guterres' warnings that the world is moving in the wrong direction. She threw away her original script and instead gave a passionate post in which she called for global, moral leadership in the fight against climate change, economic and technological inequality, racism and unfair distribution of COVID-19 vaccines.

Following her party's landslide victory in the 2022 general election, Mottley was sworn in as prime minister for a second term on 20 January.

On 20 June 2022, it was reported that Mottley had tested positive for COVID-19. A media statement was released, stating: "It is a mild case and she has indicated that she is doing well."

Mottley hosted a retreat convened in Barbados at the end of July 2022 with senior United Nations and International Monetary Fund officials, the Rockefeller and Open Society Foundations, academics and civil society, and other international figures, following which she laid out the "Bridgetown Agenda", offering practical solutions to reform the international financial system in connection with halting climate change.

On 23 September 2022, Mottley delivered the inaugural Kofi Annan Memorial Lecture, hosted by the Kofi Annan Foundation, in partnership with the International Peace Institute, Open Society Foundations and International Crisis Group.

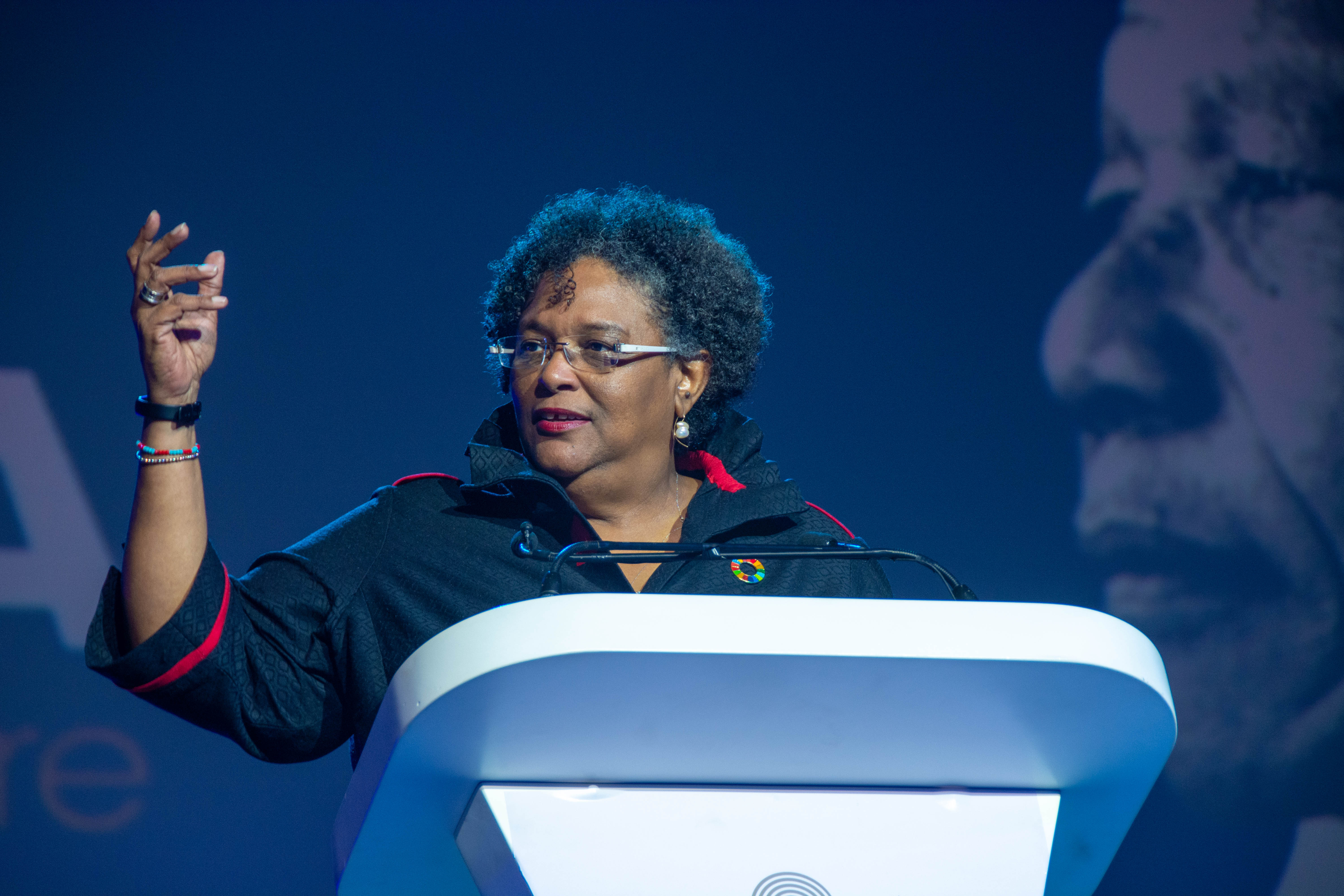
Mottley delivering the Nelson Mandela Annual Lecture in Durban, South Africa, in November 2022

In November 2022, Mottley delivered the Nelson Mandela Annual Lecture, with the theme being "Social Bonding and Decolonisation in the Context of the Climate Crisis: Perspectives from the Global South".

On 27 November 2023, Mottley joined the advisory board of the Global Center on Adaptation.

Mottley addressed the United Nations General Assembly again in September 2024, succeeding Israeli prime minister Benjamin Netanyahu as speaker. The speech disavowed global wars in general and the Gaza war and Israel–Hezbollah conflict in particular, claiming war to be a distraction and drain on funding which could be used instead to combat the global climate crisis and emerging infectious disease.

In February 2025 while at the 38th African Union (AU) Summit, Mottley addressed the collective heads of the body to share that the time had come for Africa and the Caribbean to overcome their trans-Atlantic destinies.

Mottley was elected to a third term as prime minister after the BLP won all 30 seats in the House of Assembly in the 2026 Barbadian general election on 11 February.

Mia Mottley authored a column for Project Syndicate that said climate change jeopardizes the planet, including small island developing nations like Barbados. She has described rising temperatures as a "death sentence" for the Global South. That includes droughts, fires and rising sea levels. She writes that a new financing system is needed to address these challenges. "This is not charity; it is an investment in our collective future. When some people are left to die, all of humanity – present and future – will eventually suffer."

== Honours and awards ==
Mottley is a recipient of the following honours:

- Kenya:
  - Elder of the Order of the Golden Heart of Kenya (2019)
- Guyana:
  - Order of Roraima of Guyana (2020)
- Venezuela:
  - Grand Cordon of the Order of the Liberator (2023)
- Suriname:
  - Grand Cordon of the Ere-Orde van de Palm (2025)

Others

- Lifetime Achievement Award (Champions of the Earth) in 2021.

In December 2020, Mottley was named Person of the Year by Caribbean National Weekly, along with Oliver Mair.

In May 2022, Mottley was featured on the cover of TIME magazine, the first Barbadian to do so, and was named one of "The 100 Most Influential People of 2022", in recognition of her outspoken advocacy for addressing climate change.

In November 2022, the United Nations Foundation announced Mottley as the recipient of one of its annual Global Leadership Awards, honouring her as "Champion for Global Change" and citing "her exemplary leadership in fighting for a just, equitable, and sustainable world".

In December 2022, Mottley was named on the BBC's 100 Women list as one of the world's inspiring and influential women of the year, and by the Financial Times on "The FT's 25 most influential women of 2022".

In 2023, she was included in the Forbes list of the "World's 100 Most Powerful Women".

In 2025, Forbes magazine again named Prime Minister Mottley to their annual "World's 100 Most Powerful Women" list for 2025. Mottley secured the 99th ranking.

Parliament of Barbados
Preceded by Leroy Brathwaite	Member of Parliament for Saint Michael North East; 1994–present	Incumbent
Political offices
Preceded by	Minister of Education, Youth Affairs and Culture; 1994–1996	Succeeded by Ronald DaCosta Jones
Preceded by	Attorney General of Barbados; 2001–2003	Succeeded by Dale Marshall
Preceded by	Minister of Home Affairs; 2001–2003	Succeeded by Dale Marshall
Preceded by Billie Miller	Deputy Prime Minister of Barbados; 2003–2008	Succeeded by Freundel Stuart
Preceded by	Minister of Economic Affairs and Development; 2006–2008	Succeeded by Tyrone E. Barker
Preceded by Freundel Stuart	Prime Minister of Barbados; 2018–present	Incumbent
Preceded by Christopher Sinckler	Minister of Finance of Barbados; 2018–present	Incumbent
Party political offices
Preceded by	Shadow Minister of Culture and Community Development; 1991–1994	Succeeded by Cynthia Forde
Preceded by	General Secretary of the Barbados Labour Party; 1996–2001	Succeeded by Joseph J. S. Atherley
Preceded by Owen Seymour Arthur	Leader of the Barbados Labour Party; 2008–2010	Succeeded by Owen Seymour Arthur
Preceded by Owen Seymour Arthur	Leader of the Barbados Labour Party; 2013–present	Incumbent
