= List of deputy prime ministers of Barbados =

Deputy Prime Minister of Barbados
- Coat of arms of Barbados

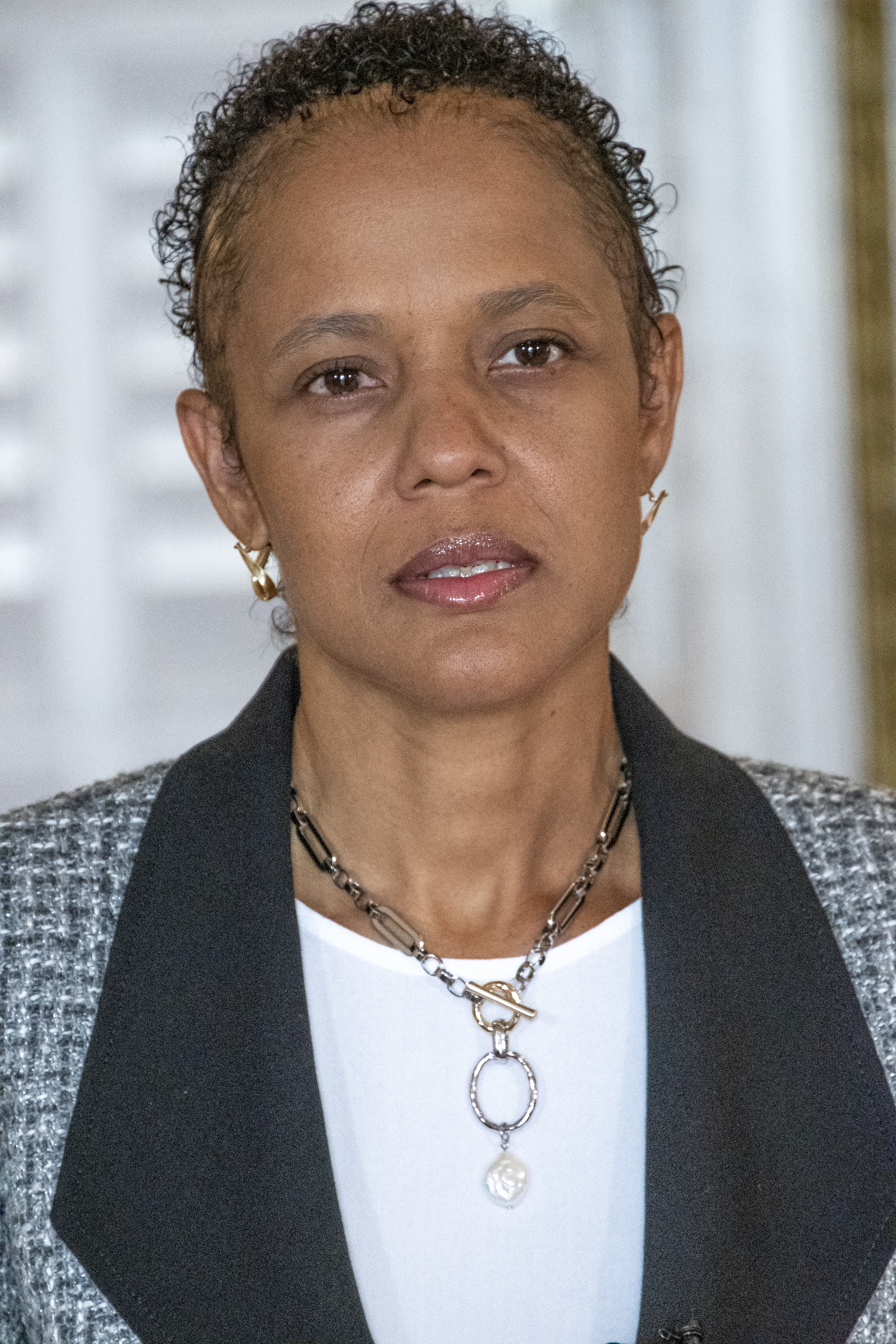
- Incumbent; Santia Bradshaw since 26 January 2022
- Style: The Honourable
- Member of: House of Assembly
- Appointer: Prime Minister of Barbados
- Term length: Five years
- Formation: 30 November 1966; 59 years ago
- First holder: James Cameron Tudor

This is a list of deputy prime ministers of Barbados.

== Deputy premiers of Barbados (1961–1966) ==
Democratic Labour Party (1)
No.	Incumbent (Birth–Death)	Portrait	Tenure		Political affiliation	Prime Minister	References
No.	Incumbent (Birth–Death)	Portrait	Took office	Left office	Political affiliation	Prime Minister	References
1	Wynter Crawford (1910–1993)		December 1961	1965	Democratic Labour Party	Errol Barrow	
2	James Cameron Tudor (1919–1995)		1965	1966	Democratic Labour Party	Errol Barrow	

== Deputy prime ministers of Barbados (Commonwealth Realm) (1966–2010) ==
Democratic Labour Party (5) Barbados Labour Party (3)
No.	Incumbent (Birth–Death)	Portrait	Tenure			Political affiliation	Prime Minister	References
No.	Incumbent (Birth–Death)	Portrait	Took office	Left office	Time in office	Political affiliation	Prime Minister	References
1	James Cameron Tudor (1919–1995)		30 November 1966	9 September 1971	4 years, 283 days	Democratic Labour Party	Errol Barrow	
2	Cuthbert Edwy Talma (1909–1994)		10 September 1971	2 September 1976	4 years, 358 days	Democratic Labour Party	Errol Barrow	
3	Harold Bernard St. John (1931–2004)		7 September 1976	11 March 1985	8 years, 185 days	Barbados Labour Party	Tom Adams	
Vacant (11 March 1985 - 3 June 1986)
4	Lloyd Erskine Sandiford (1937–2023)		3 June 1986	1 June 1987	363 days	Democratic Labour Party	Errol Barrow	
5	Philip Greaves (born 1931)		1 June 1987	6 September 1994	7 years, 97 days	Democratic Labour Party	Lloyd Erskine Sandiford	
6	Billie Miller (born 1944)		12 September 1994	21 May 2003	8 years, 251 days	Barbados Labour Party	Owen Arthur	
7	Mia Mottley (born 1965)		26 May 2003	15 January 2008	4 years, 234 days	Barbados Labour Party	Owen Arthur	
Vacant (15 January 2008- 25 November 2008)
8	Freundel Stuart (born 1951)		25 November 2008	23 October 2010	2 years, 28 days	Democratic Labour Party	David Thompson	
Vacant (23 October 2010- 30 November 2021)

== Deputy Prime Ministers of Barbados (Republic) (2022–present) ==
Barbados Labour Party (1)
No.	Incumbent (Birth–Death)	Portrait	Tenure			Political affiliation	Prime Minister	References
No.	Incumbent (Birth–Death)	Portrait	Took office	Left office	Time in office	Political affiliation	Prime Minister	References
Vacant (30 November 2021- 26 January 2022)
9	Santia Bradshaw (born 1976)		22 January 2022	Incumbent	4 years, 228 days	Barbados Labour Party	Mia Mottley	

== See also ==
- Prime Minister of Barbados
- Cabinet of Barbados
- President of Barbados
