= Lionel Seymour Craig =

Barbadian politician (1929–2014)

Lionel Seymour Craig, CHB, (13 February 1929 – 9 March 2014) was a Barbadian politician and a member of the Barbados Labour Party (BLP). He served as a Member of the Parliament of Barbados for Saint James from 1966 to 1986. He was also a Cabinet Minister between 1976 and 1986, including a tenure as Minister of Housing from 1976 and 1981, as well as the Minister of Labour.

Craig was the last surviving member of the Barbados Labour Party's 1966 parliamentary group. He was also one of the last living politicians to have worked with Sir Grantley Herbert Adams, the first Prime Minister of Barbados and the founder of the Barbados Labour Party (BLP).

== Political career ==
In 1966, Craig was elected to Parliament from the Saint James constituency under the former double member constituency representation system. He then held the St James North constituency seat once Barbados instituted the single member constituencies, which replaced the old double member representations.

Craig was a member of the Cabinet of Barbados from 1976 to 1986. He first served as the Minister of Housing from 1976 to 1981. As Housing Minister, Craig was responsible for the development of some of the country's major housing complexes, including the Bagatelle extension, Ferniehurst, the Haynesville extension, Oxnards, Rosemont, Wotton, and West Terrace. He later held the portfolio of Minister of Labour.

In 1986, Craig vacated his seat in the Saint James North constituency to contest the neighboring Saint Michael South constituency. However, he was defeated by Lloyd Erskine Sandiford, who won Saint Michael South in the 1986 Barbadian election. Craig retired from politics soon after his defeat.

== Honours ==
In 2009, Craig was named a Companion of Honour of Barbados, the country's second highest award, for his contribution to politics.

== Personal life ==
Craig underwent heart bypass surgery in 2001. However, he suffered a heart attack in February 2013.

Lionel Seymour Craig died at 9:30 a.m. on 9 March 2014, at the age of 85 at Queen Elizabeth Hospital in Bridgetown. He had been taken to the hospital suffering from chest pains. He was survived by his second wife, Tracy, whom he married in 1995; their daughter; and a son from his first marriage.
