= Glyne Murray =

Barbadian politician and diplomat

Glyne Samuel Hyvestra Murray is a Barbadian politician, businessman and diplomat. He was the former minister of state in the cabinet of Prime Minister Owen Arthur. He was the former Barbadian ambassador to Canada.
