= Leader of the Opposition (Barbados) =

Leader of the largest minority party in Barbados Parliament

Leader of the Opposition of Barbados
- Coat of arms of Barbados

- Flag of Barbados
- Incumbent; Vacant since 11 February 2026
- Style: The Honourable
- Reports to: President of Barbados
- Appointer: President of Barbados
- Term length: While leader of the largest political party in the House of Assembly of Barbados that is not in government
- Inaugural holder: Sir Grantley Herbert Adams
- Formation: 1954

The leader of the opposition of Barbados is the Member of Parliament who leads the Official Opposition in the Barbados Parliament. The leader of the opposition is the leader of the largest political party in the House of Assembly of Barbados that is not in government.

== Overview ==
The political party or coalition that wins a majority of seats in Parliament forms the government headed by a prime minister. The political party with the second-largest majority forms the official opposition whose leader as the leader of the opposition.

The office was established alongside ministerial cabinet in 1954. Fred Goddard was the first leader of the opposition.

== List of leaders of the opposition ==
- Fred Goddard (1954 - 1956)
- Theodore Brancker (1956 - 1961)
- Ernest Deighton Mottley (1961 - 1966)
- Sir Grantley Herbert Adams (30 November 1966 - December 1970)
- Harold Bernard St. John (December 1970 - 10 September 1971)
- Tom Adams (10 September 1971 - 8 September 1976)
- Frederick G. Smith (8 September 1976 - July 1978)
- Errol Barrow (July 1978 - 29 May 1986)
- Henry deBoulay Forde (29 May 1986 - February 1989)
- Richard Christopher Haynes (February 1989 - 22 January 1991)
- Henry deBoulay Forde (22 January 1991 - 1 August 1993)
- Owen Arthur (1 August 1993 – 6 September 1994)
- David Thompson (September 1994 – September 2000)
- Clyde Mascoll (September 2000 – January 2006)
- David Thompson (January 2006 – January 2008)
- Mia Mottley (7 February 2008 – 18 October 2010)
- Owen Arthur (18 October 2010 – 26 February 2013)
- Mia Mottley (26 February 2013 – 25 May 2018)
- Joseph Atherley (1 June 2018 – 19 January 2022)
- Ralph Thorne (12 February 2024 – 11 February 2026)

== See also ==
- Cabinet of Barbados
