= Harold Bernard St. John =

Barbadian politician and prime minister

The Right Honourable Sir Harold Bernard St. John KA
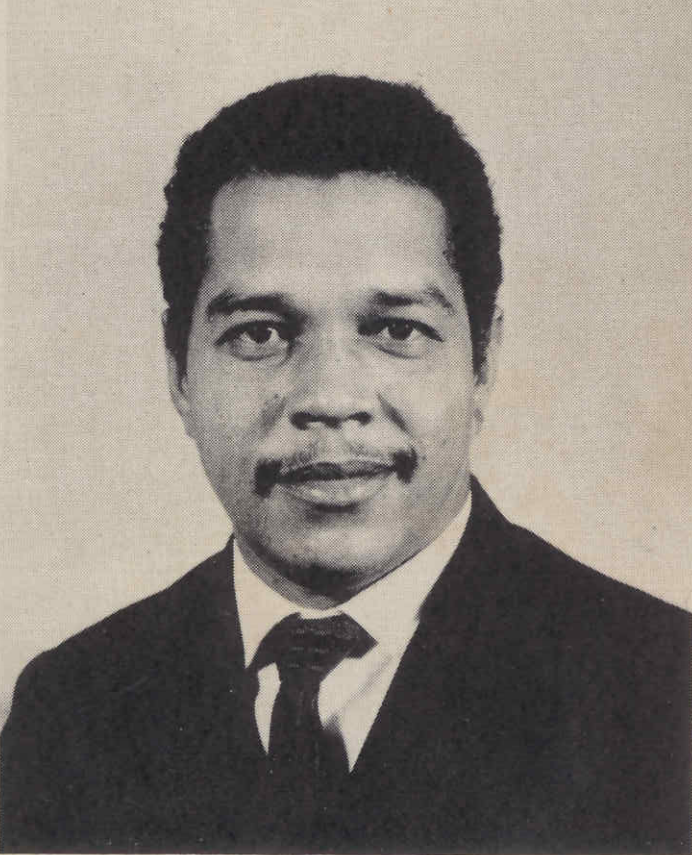

3rd Prime Minister of Barbados
- In office 11 March 1985 – 29 May 1986
- Monarch: Elizabeth II
- Governor-General: Hugh Springer
- Preceded by: J.M.G. (Tom) Adams
- Succeeded by: Errol Barrow
- Constituency: Christ Church South

3rd Deputy Prime Minister of Barbados
- In office 7 September 1976 – 11 March 1985
- Prime Minister: J.M.G. (Tom) Adams
- Preceded by: Cuthbert Edwy Talma
- Succeeded by: Lloyd Erskine Sandiford

Personal details
- Born: 16 August 1931 Christ Church, British Windward Islands, (present day Barbados)
- Died: 29 February 2004 (aged 72) Bridgetown, Barbados
- Party: Barbados Labour Party
- Spouse: Lady Stella St. John (née Hope)
- Profession: Lawyer

Sir Harold Bernard St. John, KA (16 August 1931 – 29 February 2004) was a Barbadian politician who served as the third prime minister of Barbados from 1985 to 1986. To date, he is the shortest serving Barbadian prime minister. He was leader of the Barbados Labour Party from 1970 to 1971 and again from 1985 to 1987. He was widely known as Bree.

== Biography ==
St. John was born in the Parish of Christ Church and attended the Christ Church Foundation School. He was professionally trained as a lawyer at the University College London and was called to the Bar at the Inner Temple in 1958. In 1959, before the island became independent from the United Kingdom, St. John joined the Barbados Labour Party beginning an opposition representative in the pre-independence Senate of Barbados in 1964. After independence in 1966, he was elected to the Barbados House of Assembly. He served as a member of the Upper Chamber between 1971 and 1976 as a member of the Opposition party.

St. John left the Senate of Barbados when he was re-elected to the House of Assembly of Barbados in 1976, when his party under J. M. G. Adams won the election. He served in numerous cabinet positions in the 1970s including deputy prime minister, minister of trade and industry, and minister of tourism, where he did his most influential work in developing the tourism industry in Barbados. When Adams died in 1985, St. John became prime minister. During his tenure as prime minister, he held the additional portfolio of Minister of Finance. The following year he was defeated in the elections by Errol Barrow and the Democratic Labour Party.

In 1994 when the BLP regained power, he did not return to the Cabinet and served instead as a backbencher under Owen Arthur. That same year St. John was conferred the highest honour in Barbados; he was made a Knight of St. Andrew (KA) of the Order of Barbados.

In 2004, Bernard St. John died of cancer in Bridgetown, aged 72. He left his widow Lady Stella (née Hope) and three children: Bryte, Charmaine and Nicole.

== See also ==
- Politics of Barbados
- List of Premiers/Prime Ministers of Barbados

Political offices
Preceded by J. M. G. Adams	Prime Minister of Barbados; 1985–1986	Succeeded by Errol Barrow
Preceded by J. M. G. Adams	Minister of Finance of Barbados; 1985–1986	Succeeded by Richie Haynes
