= Carol Lady Haynes =

Jamaican doctor and politician

Carol Lady Haynes, born Carol Jacobs, is a Jamaican-Barbadian doctor and politician. From 2015 to 2018, she was an independent member of the Senate of Barbados, and is well-known for her work in response to HIV/AIDS in Barbados as a doctor before entering the senate.

== Life and career ==
Carol Jacobs was born in Jamaica, the daughter of Dr. Lenworth Jacobs, and his wife, Mrs. Beth Jacobs, of St. Ann's Bay, Jamaica. She received her early education at St. Hilda's Diocesan High School and Hampton School, in Jamaica. A graduate of the University of the West Indies, she made Barbados her home. She gained early experience as a medical doctor at the Queen Elizabeth Hospital, Barbados. In 1979 she began her own private practice in family medicine. In 1988 she started involvement with the HIV/AIDS programme.

She married the doctor and politician Sir Richard Haynes (1936–2013), and the couple had two sons.

In 2000 she received the Barbados Centennial Honour. From 2001 to 2008 she chaired the Barbados National HIV Commission, serving as the Prime Minister's Special Envoy. In 2005 she was unanimously elected as Chair of the Global Fund to Fight AIDS, Tuberculosis and Malaria, the first woman and the first Caribbean person to hold this office. That year she also received the UNAIDS Gold Medal of Achievement. In 2006 she was the first ever recipient of the Barbados Gold Award of Achievement. However, in 2007 Barbados Underground called for her resignation, along with that of Prime Minister Owen Arthur, for having "failed Barbados in the fight against the spread of HIV/AIDS".

Carol Lady Haynes was sworn in as senator on 5 March 2015, and announced her intention to continue to practice as a doctor while serving as senator. In 2016 she was awarded an honorary degree from the University of the West Indies.
