= Philip Greaves =

Barbadian politician

The Right Honourable Sir Philip Greaves KA

Acting Governor-General of Barbados
- In office 1 July 2017 – 8 January 2018
- Monarch: Elizabeth II
- Prime Minister: Freundel Stuart
- Preceded by: Elliott Belgrave
- Succeeded by: Sandra Mason

5th Deputy Prime Minister of Barbados
- In office 1 June 1987 – 6 September 1994
- Preceded by: Lloyd Erskine Sandiford
- Succeeded by: Billie Miller
- Prime Minister: Lloyd Erskine Sandiford

Personal details
- Born: 19 January 1931 (age 95) British Windward Islands (now Barbados)
- Party: Democratic Labour Party

Sir Philip Greaves, KA (born 19 January 1931) is a Barbadian retired politician and former cabinet minister.

== Early life ==
Greaves is a barrister and former teacher.

== Political career ==
In 1965, he was appointed as a Cabinet Minister by the then-Premier, Errol Walton Barrow. The following year, in 1966, he was chosen as part of the delegation to England to negotiate for Barbados' Independence, and remains the only surviving member of the delegation. He has been a member of the Democratic Labour Party (DLP) since 1966. In 1971 he was appointed to the Senate of Barbados and as minister of home affairs. Later in 1971 he was elected to the House of Assembly of Barbados, and he was appointed as minister of housing and labour until the election defeat in 1976. In 1986 he was appointed as minister of transport, works and communications.

Greaves served as the deputy prime minister of Barbados from 1 June 1987 until 6 September 1994 under Lloyd Erskine Sandiford. He later served as acting governor-general of Barbados from 1 July 2017 until 8 January 2018.

== Personal life ==
Greaves is a member of the Seventh-day Adventist Church.

Political offices
Preceded by Sir Elliott Belgrave	Governor General of Barbados; Acting; 2017–2018	Succeeded by Dame Sandra Mason
