= National Democratic Party (Barbados) =

- Abbreviation: NDP
- Leader: Richard Haynes
- President: Richard Haynes
- Founder: Richard Haynes
- Founded: 1989
- Dissolved: 1998
- Split from: Democratic Labour Party
- Political position: Centre
- Colors

The National Democratic Party was a centrist political party in Barbados which had been founded in 1989 by four defecting Democratic Labour Party ministers of parliament, led by the former finance minister Richard Haynes. The party first contested national elections in 1991, when it won 6.8% of the vote, but failed to win a seat. In the 1994 elections it increased its share of the vote to 12.8% and won a single seat. However, the party did not contest any further elections.

== Elections ==
Election	Party Leader	Votes	%	Seats	+/–	Position	Government
1991	Richard Haynes	8,218	6.8	0 / 28	0	▲3rd	Extra-parliamentary
1994	Richard Haynes	15,980	12.77	1 / 28	▲1	3rd	Opposition
