= Yvonne Walkes =

Barbadian politician

- Occupations: politician and diplomat
- Known for: senator and High Commissioner
- Political party: Democratic Labour Party

Yvonne V. Walkes is a Barbadian politician. She was a senator from 1990 to 1994. In 2015 she was her country's High Commissioner to Canada.

== Career ==
She was a trade unionist in the 1970s and she began lecturing at the Barbados Workers’ Union Labour College in Saint Peter rising to be a Senior Tutor.

Walkes joined the Democratic Labour Party, and stood in the St Peter constituency seat in 1991 against Owen Arthur. She lost, and Arthur became the prime minister. He continued to be Prime Minister when he beat her into second place in the same constituency in 1994 and 1999. In 1999 she became the president of the National Organisation of Women (NOW).

She was elected to be the president of the Democratic League of Women in 2005. In 2015 she resigned that position when she was chosen as her country's high commissioner to Canada.

In 2025 she was speaking out in support of the DLP leader Ralph Thorne who was the leader of the opposition. She criticised the government and in particular its budget and its support for trade unionists.
