= Julie Arthur =

First Lady of Barbados

Julie Ann Arthur (née Price; born 1966/1967) is the widow of the former Prime Minister of Barbados, Owen Arthur, whom she married on August 12, 2006 in Bridgetown. The couple enjoyed their honeymoon in Birmingham, England.

They have one daughter together, Leah.
