= Attorney-General of Barbados =

Primary legal advisor to the Government

The Attorney-General of Barbados is the primary legal advisor to the Government of Barbados.

== Legal basis ==
According to Article 72 of the Constitution of Barbados, the Attorney-General holds ministerial rank in the government. He may, in the case of certain offences, give general or special directions to the Director of Public Prosecutions, which the latter must follow.

== List of attorneys-general ==
- Robert Hooper c.1693
- Edward Chilton, 1698 to 1705
- Thomas Hodges, FRS ?1706 to ?1721
- Jonathan Blenman, 1726 to
- Blenman 1728 to
- Timothy Blenman, 1741 to
- Henry Beckles, 1770 to 1772
- Robert Burnett
- Anthony Chester
- Robert Burnett Jones
- John Beckles, 1807 to 1823
- Matthew Coulthurst, to 1824
- Samuel Hinds, 1824 to 1826
- Henry Edward Sharpe, 1826 to 1828
- John Paynter Musson, 1828 to 1831
- Henry Edward Sharpe, 1831 to c. 1838
- post of Attorney-General of Barbados vacant, c. 1838 to 1841
- Henry Edward Sharpe, 1841 to 1846
- John Sealy, 1846 to >1869
- Francis Fleming, 1878 to 1882
- William Conrad Reeves, 1882 to 1886l
- Sir Henry Alleyne Bovell, 1886 to aft.1893
- G. Aubrey Goodman, 1907 to 1913
- Hon Sir Charles Pitcher Clarke, 1913 to 1925
- Sir Kenneth Elliston Poyser, 1925 to 1928
- Ernest Allan Collymore, 1928 to 1936
- Edward Keith Walcott, 1936 to 1946
- Sir John Whyatt, 1948 to 1951
- Sir William Campbell Wylie, 1951 to 1955
- Wilfred Jacobs, 1961 to 1963
- Barbados became independent, 1966
- Sir Frederick Smith, 1966 to 1971
- George Moe, 1971 to 1976
- Sir Henry de Boulay Forde, 1976 to 1981
- Louis Randall Tull, 1981 to 1985
- Sir David Anthony Simmons, 1985 to 1986
- Maurice Athelstan King, 1986 to 1994
- Sir David Anthony Simmons, 1994 to 2001
- Mia Mottley, 2001 to 2006 [1st female]
- Dale Marshall, 2006 to 2008
- Freundel Stuart, 2008 to 2010 (departed the position to become acting PM)
- Adriel Brathwaite, 2010 to 2018
- Dale Marshall, 2018 to 2026
- Wilfred Abrahams, 2026 to present

== See also ==
- Justice ministry
- Politics of Barbados
