= George Moe =

Barbadian judge and politician

George Cecil Rawle Moe CHB (12 March 1932 – 16 August 2004) was a Barbadian judge and politician.

== Early life ==
He was born in Barbados to Cecil and Odessa (née Marshall) Moe and educated at Harrison College, Oxford University and Columbia University, New York, where he was awarded L.L.M. He studied law and was called to the bar at the Middle Temple in London.

== Career ==
Moe began his legal career in his native Barbados, where his positions including Magistrate, Acting Assistant Legal Draughtsman, and Crown Counsel and Senior Crown Counsel in the Attorney General's Chambers. In the early 1970s he served as Permanent Representative of Barbados to the United Nations. He then went on to serve as Attorney General, Minister of Legal Affairs, and Minister of External Affairs under Errol Barrow from 1971 to 1976.

His career then took him out of his native country to Belize, where he served as Chief Justice from 1982 to 1985. He was the second Barbadian to hold that post, after Erskine Ward from 1955 to 1957. Following that, he joined the Court of Appeal of the Eastern Caribbean Supreme Court on 1 September 1985, where he sat until his retirement on 31 October 1991.

== Personal life ==
He married Olga Louise Atkinson and with her had two sons and a daughter. He was named a Companion of Honour of Barbados in 1992.

He died in Queen Elizabeth Hospital, Bridgetown at the age of 72 after a lengthy illness, and was given a state funeral at the Christ Church Parish Church. He was survived by his wife Olga and his children Stephen and Lucille.

Legal offices
Preceded by Albert Staine	Chief Justice of the Supreme Court of Belize; 1982–1985	Succeeded by George Brown (acting)
