= Louis Tull =

Barbadian lawyer and government minister (born 1938)

Sir Louis Tull KA SC MP
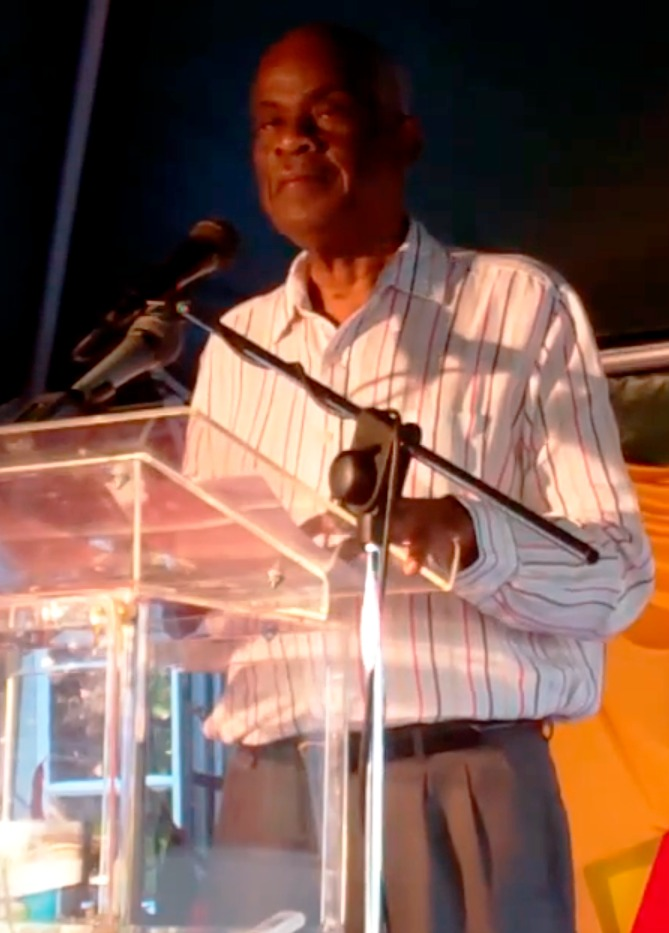
- Tull in 2013

Member of the Senate of Barbados
- In office 1971–1976

Member of the House of Assembly of Barbados
- In office 1976–1981

Member of Parliament for Saint Peter
- In office 1971–1988

Personal details
- Born: Louis Randall Tull; 27 January 1938 (age 88) Lears, St. Michael, Barbados
- Parents: Ordene Hayne Tull (father); Carlotta Jessica Goddard (mother)
- Awards: Knight St Andrew of the Order of Barbados

Sir Louis Randall Tull KA SC MP (born 27 January 1938) is a Barbados criminal attorney-at-Law and former BLP Member of Parliament.

== Career ==
Louis Randall Tull was born in Lears, Saint Michael, Barbados on 27 January 1938.

Having specialized in criminal law, Tull worked successfully at the Bar in Barbados during 1968.

His first political appointment was as Minister of Education and Culture in 1976. In 1971 he became a Senator in the Barbados Senate and in 1976 an elected Member of Parliament in the House Assembly Barbados, Bridgetown between 1976 and 1981.

In 1975 as Minister of Education and Culture, Tull attended and gave a speech at the opening ceremony where Her Majesty the Queen and Prince Philip unveiled the plaque for Barbados Community College’s $2.8 million expansion of its laboratories, auditoriums, gymnasium, library and student center in Bridgetown (1970-1975).

As Minister of Education and Culture, he introduced the new Education Act and initiated the planning for the CARIFESTA programme, after winning Barbados as the venue for the fourth Caribbean Festival.

In 1979 he represented the BLP party in St. Philip (South) and in 1981 won by 1,623 votes.

He was appointed Queen's Counsel in 1981 and Attorney-General, minister foreign affairs between 1981 and 1985 (succeeded Mr. Henry Forde); Minister of commerce, industry and consumer affairs for 1985/1986 and a Member of the Senate from 1986.

The nearby island of Grenada was going through a political crisis in 1983 and Barbados’ Prime Minister at the time, Tom Adams, had an intense dislike of Bishop of Grenada but Foreign Minister Tull was not sold on the idea of any invasion and thought he might turn Bishop so on 21 Jan 1983 went as a delegate to Cuna for talks.

On 3 Dec 1997, as special envoy of the Minister of Foreign Affairs for Barbados, Mr Tull was at the signing ceremony of the Mine Ban Treaty which committed Barbados and the Caribbean to a land mine-free zone.

== Honours and awards ==
Among some of his achievements, Tull was decorated in 1981 with the highest Colombian award, "The Great Cross of Boyaca" by Dr. Carlos Simmonds, Colombia's Minister of Foreign Affairs. He was also appointed to the Bar at the Inner Temple, London as Barbados' newest Queen's Counsel.

Awarded Legal Education Certificate on 14 September 1984 from Ocho Rios, Jamaica.

He was given Membership of UWI Campus Council Cave Hill between 2005 and 2006.

For his service to the country, in November 2006, Tull received the Knight of St Andrew, an award within the Order of Barbados introduced by Barbados in 1980.

Diplomatic posts
Government offices
