= 1999 Barbadian general election =

Election in Barbados

← 1994	20 January 1999	2003 →

28 seats in the House of Assembly 15 seats needed for a majority
- Turnout: 63.36% (▲2.47pp)
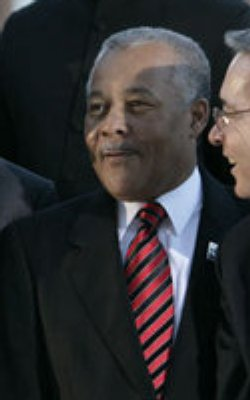

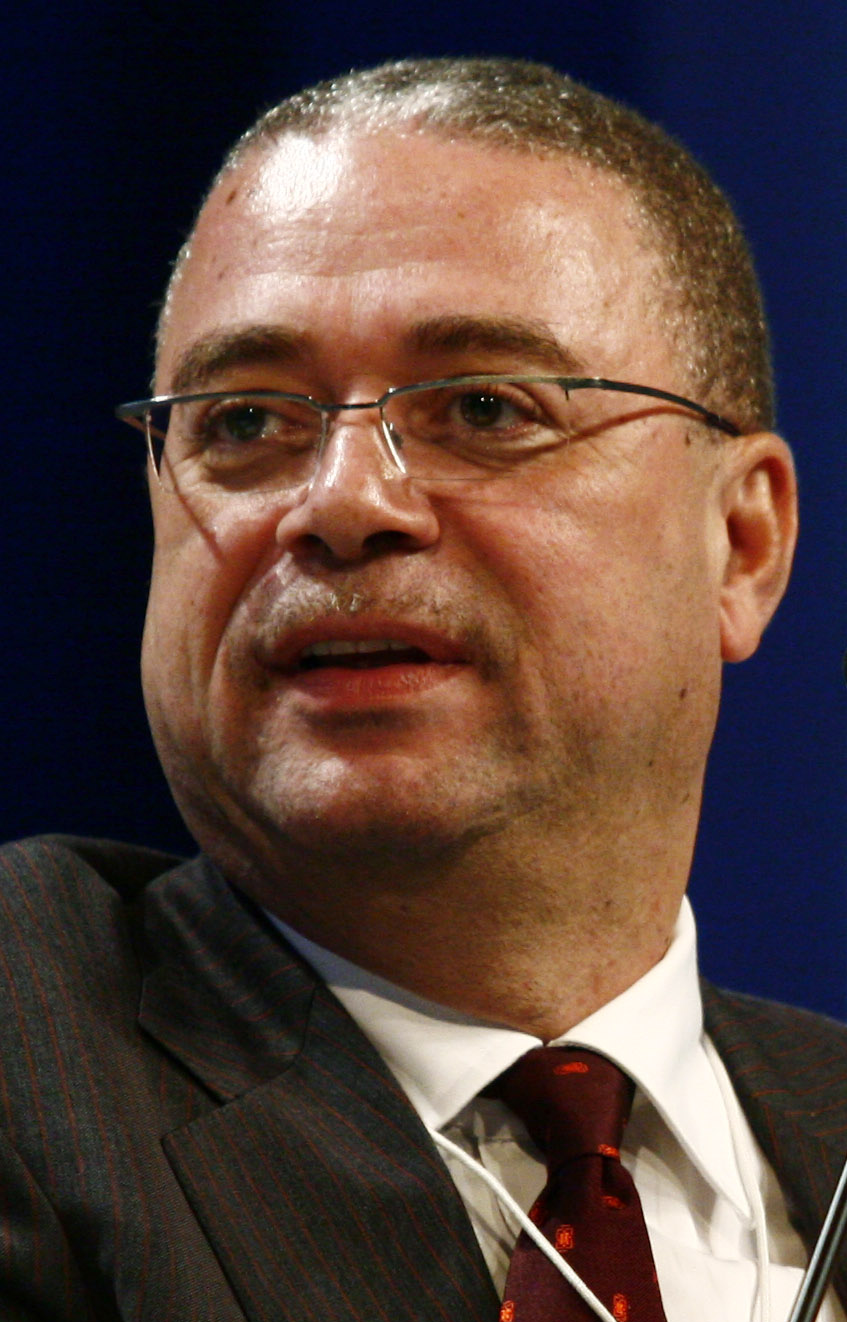
	First party	Second party
Leader	Owen Arthur	David Thompson
Party	BLP	DLP
Leader's seat	St. Peter	St. John
Last election	19 seats	8 seats
Seats won	26	2
Seat change	▲7	▼6
Popular vote	83,445	45,118
Percentage	64.87%	35.08%
Swing	▲16.53pp	▼3.25pp
- Results by constituency
Prime Minister before election
Owen Arthur
Barbados Labour Party
Elected Prime Minister
Owen Arthur
Barbados Labour Party

General elections were held in Barbados on 20 January 1999. The result was a landslide victory for the Barbados Labour Party led by Owen Arthur, which won 26 of the 28 seats. The opposition Democratic Labour Party led by David Thompson, only won two seats. Voter turnout was 63.4%.

At the time, this was the largest margin of victory since universal suffrage was introduced in 1951. This record would be broken in 2018, when the BLP won all 30 seats in the House of Assembly.

== Results ==
Party	Votes	%	Seats	+/–
Barbados Labour Party	83,445	64.87	26	+7
Democratic Labour Party	45,118	35.08	2	–6
Independents	67	0.05	0	0
Total	128,630	100.00	28	0
Valid votes	128,630	99.37		
Invalid/blank votes	820	0.63		
Total votes	129,450	100.00		
Registered voters/turnout	204,307	63.36		
Source: Nohlen
