= Frederick Smith (Barbadian barrister) =

Barbadian politician

Sir Frederick Smith KA, MBE, QC
- Born: 6 July 1924; Barbados
- Died: 11 July 2016 (aged 92)
- Education: Gray's Inn
- Alma mater: Combermere School; Harrison College
- Occupations: Lawyer; politician; jurist
- Known for: Attorney-General of Barbados; former Chief Justice of the Turks and Caicos Islands

Sir Frederick Smith, KA, MBE, QC (6 July 1924 – 11 July 2016) was the former Attorney-General of Barbados and former Chief Justice of the Turks and Caicos Islands 1987–1990, President of the Court of Appeal of Grenada and assistant Attorney General of British Cameroons.

== Biography ==
He was born in Barbados, the son of Cecil Gladstone Smith and his wife Lilian Angelique and was educated at Combermere School (1934 to 1936) and Harrison College (1936 to 1944). He went to the United Kingdom to study law at Gray's Inn in 1949 and established a private practice (Smith and Smith) upon returning to Barbados in 1952 with his brother Vernon Smith QC.

He worked in Jamaica and directly with the British Foreign Office on revising the Cayman Islands constitution.

Smith was a founding member of the Barbados-based Democratic Labour Party. He served on the first Provisional General Council and as the first party chairman from 1955 to 1956 after which he was elected to the Barbados House of Assembly. He served as Attorney General of Barbados from 1966 to 1971. He briefly served as leader of the opposition and the DLP from 1976 until returning the mantle to the previous party leader Errol Barrow in 1978. He was knighted by Queen Elizabeth II in November 1987.

Sir Frederick was outspoken in saying it is time for Barbados to do away with its affiliation with the Barbadian monarchy and to become an independent republic.
