= Owen Arthur =

Prime Minister of Barbados from 1994 to 2008

The Right Honourable Owen Arthur PC
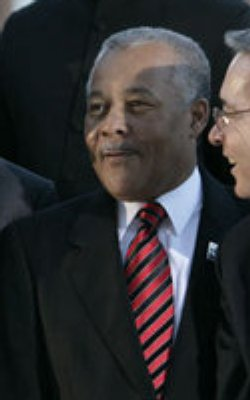

5th Prime Minister of Barbados
- In office 6 September 1994 – 15 January 2008
- Monarch: Elizabeth II
- Governors-General: Nita Barrow; Clifford Husbands
- Deputy: Billie Miller (1994–2003); Mia Mottley (2003–2008)
- Preceded by: Erskine Sandiford
- Succeeded by: David Thompson

Leader of the Opposition
- In office 1 August 1993 – 6 September 1994
- Prime Minister: Lloyd Erskine Sandiford
- Preceded by: Henry deBoulay Forde
- Succeeded by: David Thompson
- In office 18 October 2010 – 26 February 2013
- Prime Minister: Freundel Stuart
- Preceded by: Mia Mottley
- Succeeded by: Mia Mottley

Member of Parliament for Saint Peter
- In office 22 November 1984 – 6 March 2018
- Preceded by: Sybil Leacock (July 1984 – November 1984); Burton Hinds (1966–1984)
- Succeeded by: Colin Jordan

Personal details
- Born: Owen Seymour Arthur; 17 October 1949 Bridgetown, British Windward Islands (present day Barbados)
- Died: 27 July 2020 (aged 70) Bridgetown, Barbados
- Party: Barbados Labour Party (until 2014)
- Other political affiliations: Independent (2014–2018)
- Spouse(s): Beverly Arthur (née Batchelor) (m. 1978; div. 2000); Julie Arthur (m. 2006)
- Children: 2 daughters: Leah and Sabrina
- Parents: Frank Leroy Arthur (father); Iretha "Doll" Arthur (mother)

Owen Seymour Arthur PC (17 October 1949 – 27 July 2020) was a Barbadian politician who served as the fifth prime minister of Barbados from 6 September 1994 to 15 January 2008. He is the longest-serving Barbadian prime minister to date. He also served as Leader of the Opposition from 1 August 1993 to 6 September 1994 and from 23 October 2010 to 21 February 2013.

Arthur was a firm advocate for regional integration and cooperation among the countries of the Caribbean. He was described by CARICOM as the chief architect of the Caribbean Single Market and Economy. He argued in favour of making the Caribbean Court of Justice the final court of appeal for countries of the Caribbean, and he advocated for the University of the West Indies, regional airline LIAT, and projection of resistance against infringement on sovereignty by large nations.

== Early life and education ==
Arthur studied at All Saints Boys’ School, Coleridge and Parry Boys' School, and Harrison College. He earned a BA degree in economics and history in 1971 at the University of the West Indies – Cave Hill, Barbados, and an MSc degree in economics in 1974 at the University of the West Indies – Mona, Jamaica. After graduating, he joined Jamaica's National Planning Agency as an Assistant Economic Planner and later served as Director of Economics at the Jamaica Bauxite Institute between 1979 and 1981. In 1981, he returned to Barbados and worked for the Barbadian Ministry of Finance and Planning (1981–1983, 1985–1986) and also served as a Research Fellow at the UWI's Institute of Social and Economics Research (now the Sir Arthur Lewis Institute of Social and Economic Studies (SALISES)) from 1983 to 1985.

== Political career ==
=== Member of Parliament ===
Arthur was appointed to the Senate of Barbados in 1983, and won a by-election to the House of Assembly in 1984 for the constituency of Saint Peter. In 1985 he was appointed to be parliamentary secretary at the Ministry of Finance and Economic Affairs, a position he held until 1986. Arthur served concurrently as a part-time lecturer in management at UWI Cave Hill until he was chosen to be the leader of the Barbados Labour Party in 1993, making him the parliamentary Leader of the Opposition.

Arthur won the St Peter constituency seat for thirty years starting in 1984. In 1991, 1994 and 1999, including while he was Prime Minister, he was opposed by Yvonne Walkes who represented the Democratic Labour Party.

=== Fifth Prime Minister of Barbados (1994–2008) ===
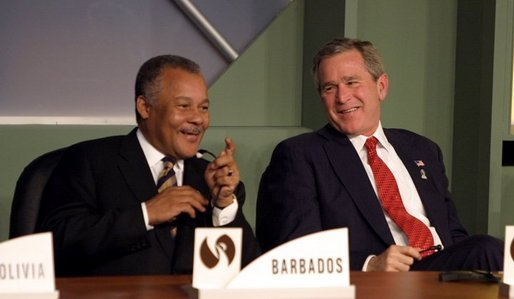
Arthur with U.S. President George W. Bush, 12 January 2004

In September 1994, the Labour Party won the general elections, making Arthur Prime Minister. He also acted as Minister of National Security, Minister of Finance, and Minister of Information, and appointed four female ministers, including all three female BLP MPs. The youngest of the four, 29 year-old Mia Mottley, eventually succeeded him as party leader in 2008 and was elected Prime Minister in 2018.

In 1995, Arthur devised the formation of a parliamentary law reform commission led by Henry Forde to advise on constitutional and institutional reform of Barbados Government., and Arthur would also that year become appointed a Privy Counsellor, giving him the title of "Right Honourable." As part of Arthur government's agenda he dedicated much of his work as Prime Minister towards advancing Caribbean regional integration, including by spearheading the creation of the CARICOM Single Market and Economy in 2001 with the signing of the Revised Treaty of Chaguaramas.

Arthur sought for Barbados to host several international community events including the UN Global Conference on Small Island Developing States (SIDS) which led to the Programme of Action for the Sustainable Development of Small Island Developing States, also referred to as the Barbados Programme of Action (BPOA), and further served as a principle negotiator in the 1997 Partnership for Prosperity and Security in the Caribbean also known as the "Bridgetown Declaration" between the West Indian nations and the United States.

After completing a popular first term, the BLP won a record-breaking 26 of 28 seats in the 1999 general election. A national plan for beautification of major business and community centres including Bridgetown, Holetown, Oistins, Speightstown, Warrens, and Wildey were devised and put into motion along with plans to greatly liberalise the Barbados economy and expand cultural industries. Plans for Double Taxation Agreements to spur international financial sector trade linkages, and for airport and seaport modernisation were also a focus.

The BLP kept a dominant majority by winning 23 of 28 seats in the 2003 general election, ensuring him a third term. A prominent plank of Arthur's platform for the 2003 elections was his promise to transform the country into a parliamentary republic, replacing Queen Elizabeth II with a Barbadian President as Head of State. Arthur planned to hold a national referendum on this proposition in 2005.

However, this timeline was pushed back due to other pressing developments, such as the implementation of the CARICOM Single Market and Economy and leading complex and difficult negotiations of the Economic Partnership Agreement between the CARIFORUM- and European Union bloc of countries along with the resulting joint Parliament.

Closer to home, Arthur took genuine interest in advancing plans for the regional hosting of the Cricket World Cup 2007. On 18 June 2007, Arthur gave an address at the U.S. Library of Congress to American and CARICOM country officials that outlined his plan for the CSME.

On 25 March 2007, on the bicentennial anniversary of the abolition of the slave trade in the British Empire, Parliament passed a resolution acknowledging that slavery was a crime against humanity. On this occasion, Arthur expressed support for slavery reparations; he felt that educational exchanges and technology transfers would be more appropriate than financial payments.

=== Leader of Opposition ===
In the general election held on 15 January 2008, the Barbados Labour Party was defeated by the Democratic Labour Party, winning ten seats against 20 for the DLP. DLP Chairman David Thompson was sworn in as prime minister on 16 January, succeeding Arthur. Despite the party's defeat, Arthur was re-elected to his own seat from St. Peter constituency with 65% of the vote. He also maintained that he could still contribute to CARICOM. On 19 January, Arthur stepped down as BLP leader, saying that an immediate leadership transition would be in the best interests of both the party and Barbadian democracy; former Deputy Prime Minister Mia Mottley was elected as the new party leader over former Attorney-General of Barbados Dale Marshall. Arthur said that he intended to serve out his parliamentary term.

In 2010, Arthur was given a vote of confidence by four of his parliamentary colleagues to return as Leader of the BLP after they expressed dissatisfaction with Mottley. A Barbados Labour Party leadership election was held on 16 October 2010 and Arthur defeated Mottley. Arthur was sworn in as Barbados' new Opposition Leader on 18 October 2010.

In the February 2013 general election, the BLP was narrowly defeated, obtaining 14 seats against 16 for the DLP. Arthur was re-elected to his seat. A few days after the election, on 26 February 2013, the BLP parliamentary group held a leadership election and elected Mottley as Leader of the Opposition, replacing Arthur. According to the party, Arthur was not present at the election in order to "give the members of the parliamentary grouping the freedom to choose the future of the Barbados Labour Party".

On 25 July 2014, Arthur submitted his resignation from the Barbados Labour Party, citing disagreements with Mottley, and served the rest of his term as an independent M.P. He did not stand in the 2018 Barbadian general election, and BLP member Colin Jordan was elected as the new M.P. for Saint Peter. After leaving the House of Assembly, Arthur retired from politics.

== Later career ==
Arthur was appointed professor of practice in Economics of Development at the University of the West Indies, Cave Hill, on 1 November 2018. He was the third professor of practice at the UWI Cave Hill Campus.

In January 2020, Arthur was appointed as Chairman of regional airline LIAT to supervise its financial recovery. He had been a staunch supporter of LIAT during his premiership.

Arthur was Chairman of the Commonwealth Observer Group during the 2020 Guyanese general election; he confirmed that the election had been orderly. He later criticized the incumbent APNU+AFC alliance for their months-long attempts to delay finalizing the election results.

== Death ==
Arthur was hospitalized with heart complications in July 2020. He died in the Queen Elizabeth Hospital in Bridgetown at 12:26 a.m on 27 July. The late prime minister was accorded a state funeral through which he was brought to the Barbados House of Assembly to lay in state from 12–13 August. Tributes followed from peers across the Americas and also from Commonwealth Secretary-General, The Baroness Scotland of Asthal.

== Honours and awards ==
Arthur was a 1999 recipient of the Order of José Martí of Cuba.

== See also ==
- Politics of Barbados

== Notes ==
Political offices
| Preceded by Erskine Sandiford | Prime Minister of Barbados; 1994–2008 | Succeeded by David Thompson |
| Preceded by David Thompson | Minister of Finance of Barbados; 1994–2008 | Succeeded by David Thompson |
