= 1971 Barbadian general election =

- 9 September 1971

24 seats in the House of Assembly 13 seats needed for a majority
- Turnout: 81.62% (▲1.92pp)
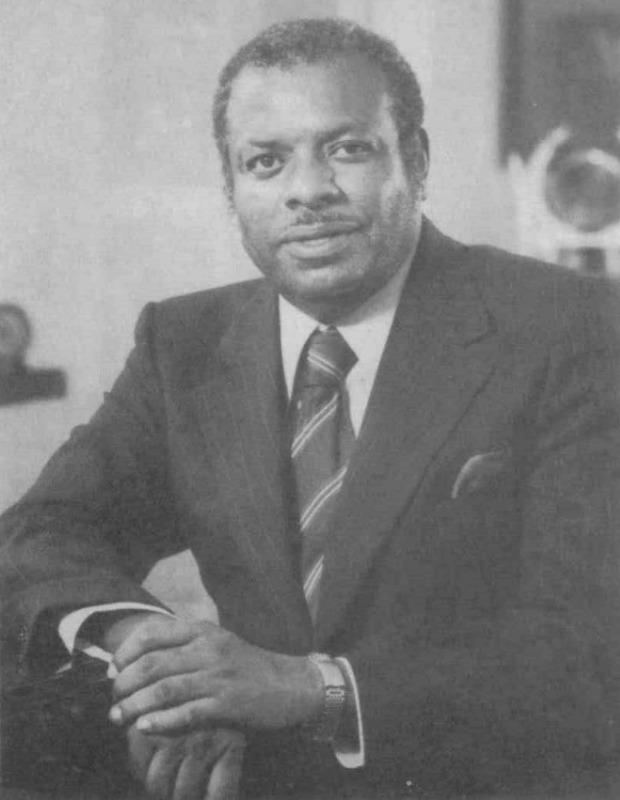

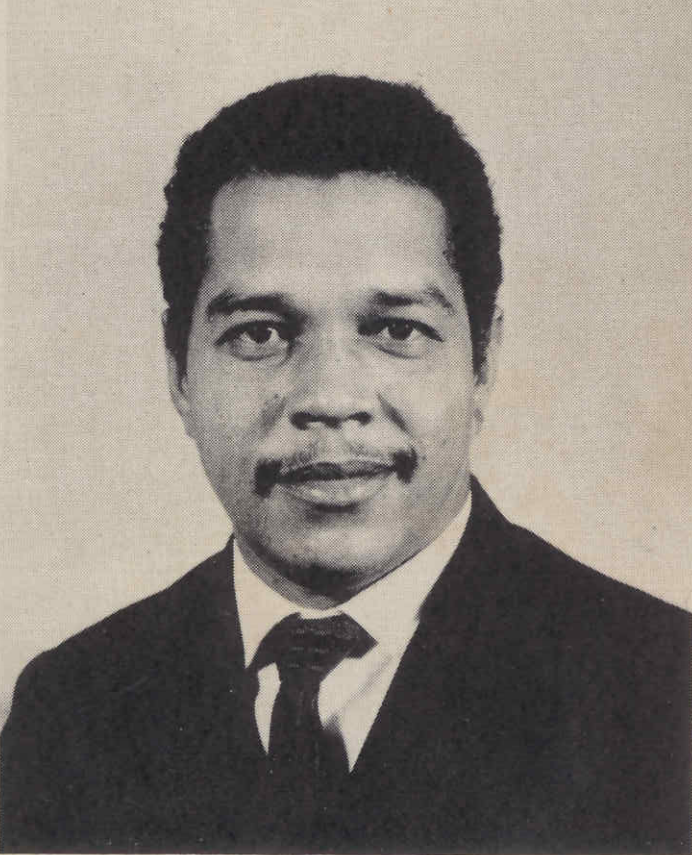
	First party	Second party
Leader	Errol Barrow	Bernard St. John
Party	DLP	BLP
Leader's seat	St. John	Christ Church South Central (Defeated)
Last election	14 seats	8 seats
Seats won	18	6
Seat change	▲4	▼2
Popular vote	53,295	39,376
Percentage	57.40%	42.41%
Swing	▲7.84pp	▲9.81pp
- Results by constituency
Prime Minister before election
Errol Barrow
DLP
Elected Prime Minister
Errol Barrow
DLP

General elections were held in Barbados on 9 September 1971. Amendments to the electoral system saw the two-member constituencies previously used replaced by single-member first-past-the-post constituencies. This was also the first election in modern Barbadian history to be contested by only two political parties, not including two independent candidates.

The result was a victory for the Democratic Labour Party, which won 18 of the 24 seats. Despite achieving a larger increase in vote share than its opponent, the Barbados Labour Party lost two seats and its leader, Harold Bernard St. John, was defeated in his constituency of Christ Church South Central. Voter turnout was 81.6%, the highest in the country's history.

== Results ==
Party	Votes	%	Seats	+/–
Democratic Labour Party	53,295	57.40	18	+4
Barbados Labour Party	39,376	42.41	6	–2
Independents	174	0.19	0	0
Total	92,845	100.00	24	0
Valid votes	92,845	98.75		
Invalid/blank votes	1,174	1.25		
Total votes	94,019	100.00		
Registered voters/turnout	115,189	81.62		
Source: Nohlen
