= 1981 Barbadian general election =

- 18 June 1981

27 seats in the House of Assembly 14 seats needed for a majority
- Turnout: 71.58% (▼2.51pp)
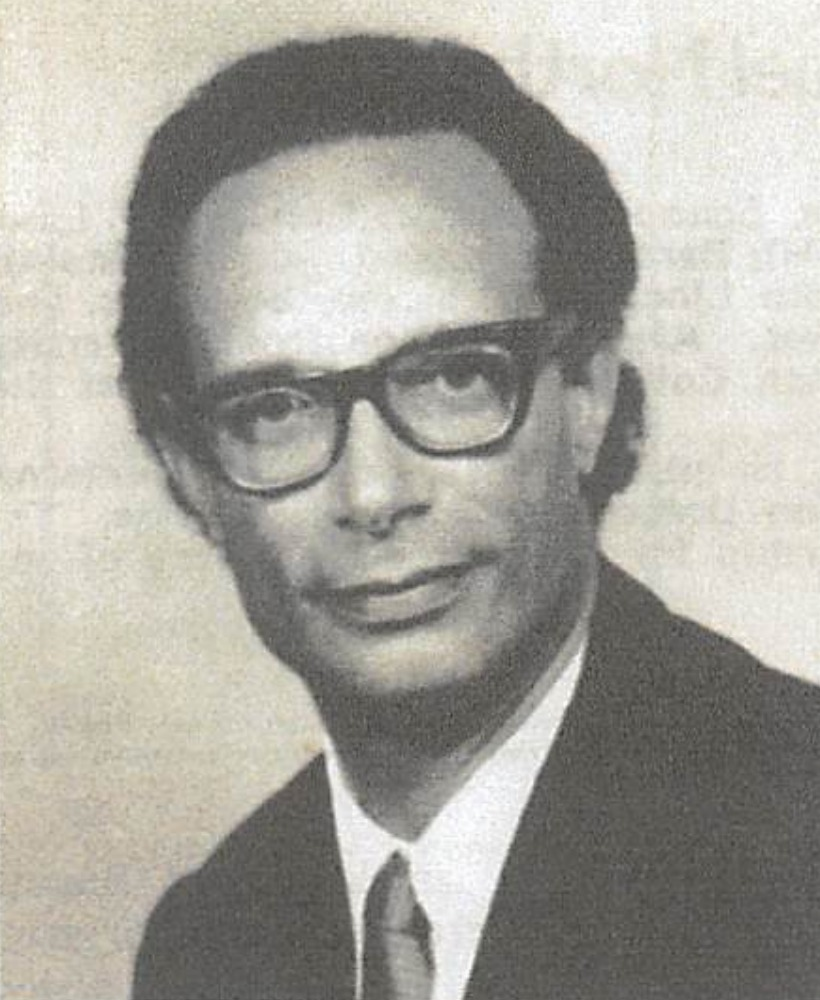

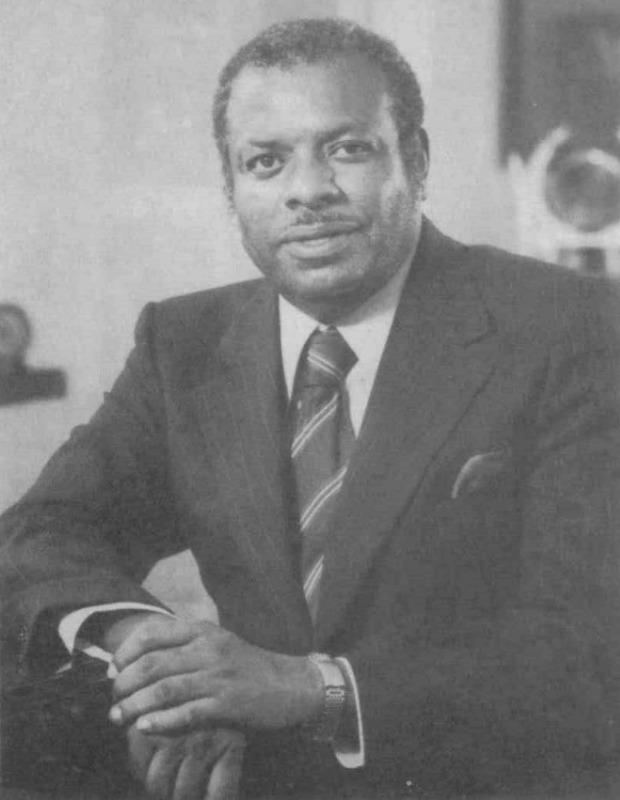
| | First party | Second party |
|---|---|---|
| Leader | Tom Adams | Errol Barrow |
| Party | BLP | DLP |
| Leader's seat | St. Thomas | St. John |
| Last election | 17 seats | 7 seats |
| Seats won | 17 | 10 |
| Seat change | Steady | ▲3 |
| Popular vote | 61,883 | 55,845 |
| Percentage | 52.22% | 47.13% |
| Swing | ▼0.47pp | ▲0.69pp |
- Results by constituency
Prime Minister before election
Tom Adams
BLP
Elected Prime Minister
Tom Adams
BLP

General elections were held in Barbados on 18 June 1981. The result was a victory for the ruling Barbados Labour Party, which won 17 of the 27 seats. Voter turnout was 71.6%.

This was the first election to take place after the Representation of the People (Amendment) Act (1980) had increased the number of seats in the House of Assembly of Barbados from 24 to 27, the first such expansion since 1843.

== Results ==
| Party | Votes | % | Seats | +/– |
|---|---|---|---|---|
| Barbados Labour Party | 61,883 | 52.22 | 17 | 0 |
| Democratic Labour Party | 55,845 | 47.13 | 10 | +3 |
| Independents | 773 | 0.65 | 0 | 0 |
| Total | 118,501 | 100.00 | 27 | +3 |
| Valid votes | 118,501 | 99.11 | | |
| Invalid/blank votes | 1,065 | 0.89 | | |
| Total votes | 119,566 | 100.00 | | |
| Registered voters/turnout | 167,029 | 71.58 | | |
Source: Nohlen
