= 1976 Barbadian general election =

- 2 September 1976

24 seats in the House of Assembly 13 seats needed for a majority
- Turnout: 74.09% (▼7.53pp)
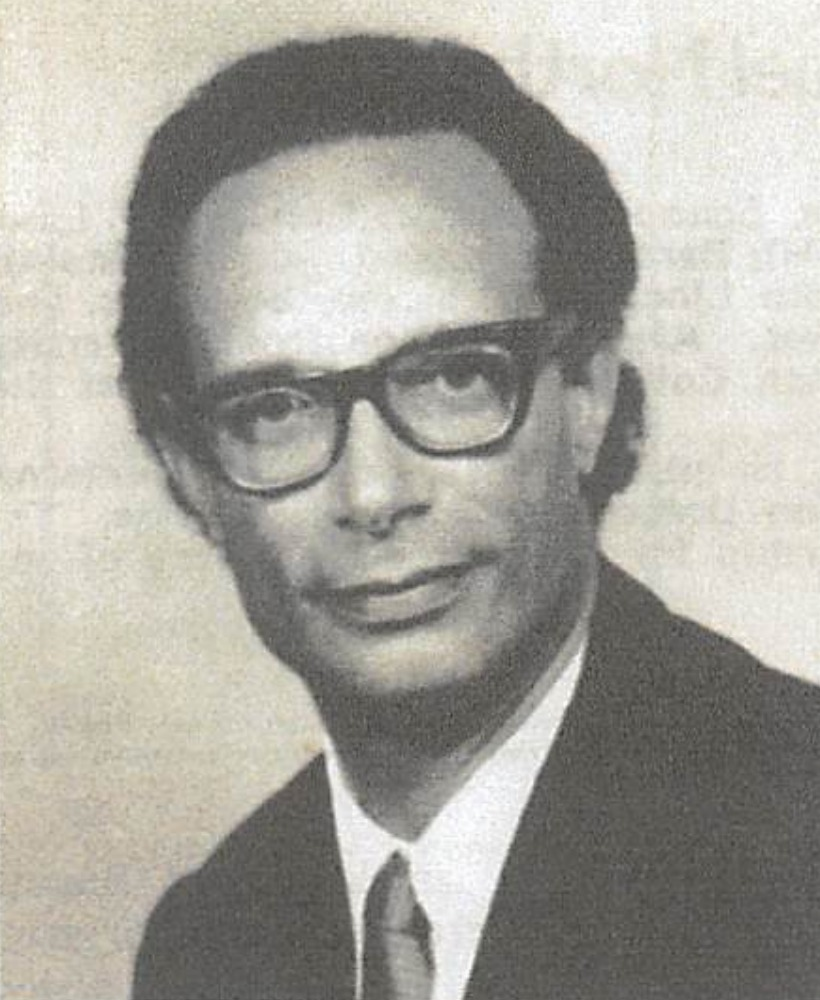

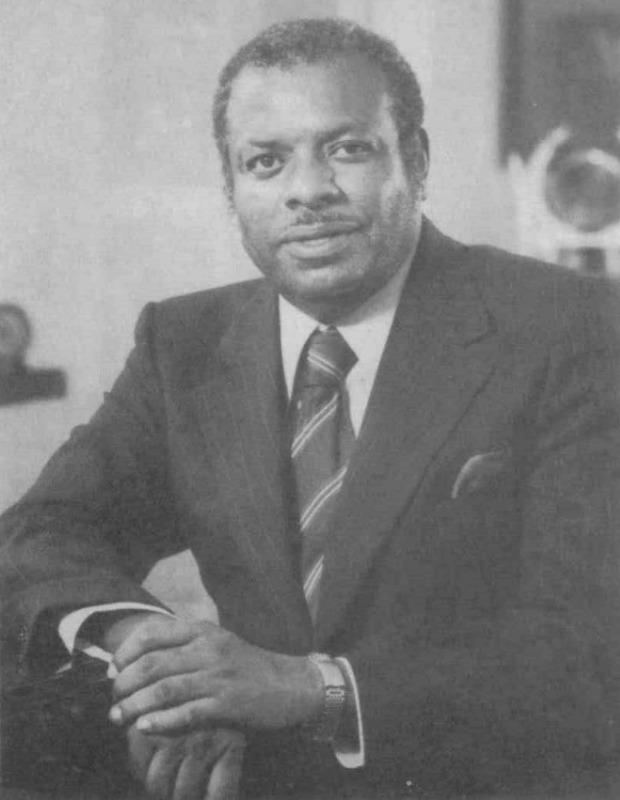
	First party	Second party
Leader	Tom Adams	Errol Barrow
Party	BLP	DLP
Leader's seat	St. Thomas	St. John
Last election	6 seats	18 seats
Seats won	17	7
Seat change	▲11	▼11
Popular vote	51,948	45,786
Percentage	52.69%	46.44%
Swing	▲10.28pp	▼10.96pp
- Results by constituency
Prime Minister before election
Errol Barrow
DLP
Elected Prime Minister
Tom Adams
BLP

General elections were held in Barbados on 2 September 1976. The result was a victory for the Barbados Labour Party, which won 17 of the 24 seats, defeating the ruling Democratic Labour Party and returning to power for the first time since 1961. This was the first and only election contested by the newly formed People's Political Alliance, whose eight candidates won only 572 votes. Voter turnout was 74.1%.

== Results ==
Party	Votes	%	Seats	+/–
Barbados Labour Party	51,948	52.69	17	+11
Democratic Labour Party	45,786	46.44	7	–11
People's Political Alliance	572	0.58	0	New
Independents	291	0.30	0	0
Total	98,597	100.00	24	0
Valid votes	98,597	99.13		
Invalid/blank votes	866	0.87		
Total votes	99,463	100.00		
Registered voters/turnout	134,241	74.09		
Source: Nohlen, Election Report
