= 2003 Barbadian general election =

- 21 May 2003

All 30 seats in the House of Assembly 16 seats needed for a majority
- Turnout: 56.88% (▼6.48pp)
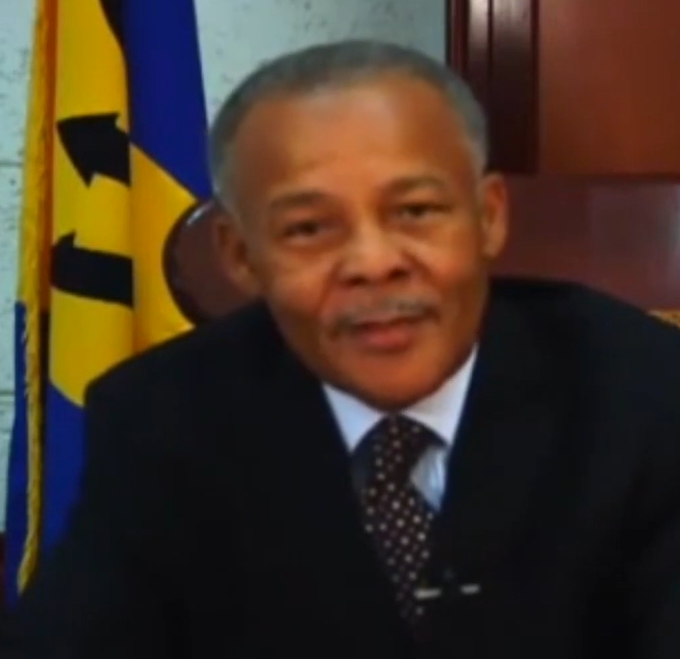

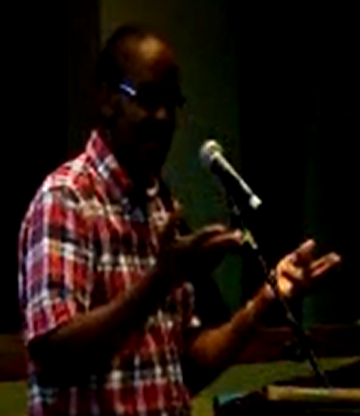
	First party	Second party
Leader	Owen Arthur	Clyde Mascoll
Party	BLP	DLP
Last election	64.87%, 26 seats	35.08%, 2 seats
Seats won	23	7
Seat change	▼3	▲5
Popular vote	69,720	54,746
Percentage	55.80%	44.09%
Swing	▼9.07pp	▲9.01pp
- Results by constituency
Prime Minister before election
Owen Arthur
BLP
Elected Prime Minister
Owen Arthur
BLP

General elections were held in Barbados on all 30 seats in the House of Assembly on 21 May 2003. The result was a victory for the Barbados Labour Party, which won 23 of the 30 seats. Voter turnout was 57%, the lowest since universal suffrage was introduced in 1951.

== Results ==
Party	Votes	%	Seats	+/–
Barbados Labour Party	69,294	55.80	23	–3
Democratic Labour Party	54,746	44.09	7	+5
Independents	137	0.11	0	0
Total	124,177	100.00	30	+2
Valid votes	124,177	99.77		
Invalid/blank votes	286	0.23		
Total votes	124,463	100.00		
Registered voters/turnout	218,811	56.88		
Source: Nohlen
