= 1994 Barbadian general election =

← 1991	6 September 1994	1999 →

All 28 seats in the House of Assembly 15 seats needed for a majority
- Turnout: 60.89% (▼2.83pp)
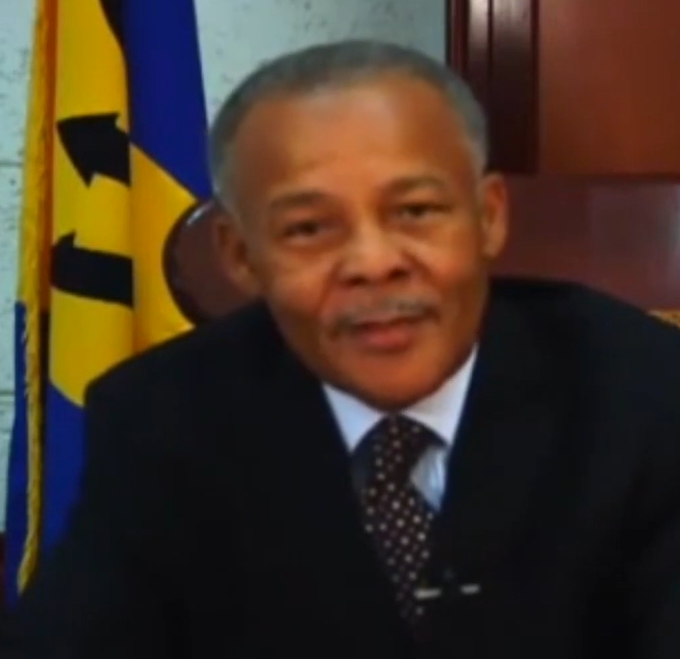

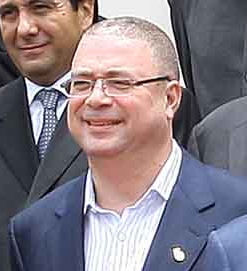

	First party	Second party	Third party
Leader	Owen Arthur	David Thompson	Richard Haynes
Party	BLP	DLP	NDP
Leader's seat	St. Peter	St. John	St. Michael South Central
Last election	10 seats	18 seats	0 seats
Seats won	19	8	1
Seat change	▲9	▼10	▲1
Popular vote	60,504	47,979	15,980
Percentage	48.34%	38.33%	12.77%
Swing	▲5.31pp	▼11.44pp	▲5.94pp
- Results by constituency
Prime Minister before election
Lloyd Erskine Sandiford
Democratic Labour Party
Elected Prime Minister
Owen Arthur
Barbados Labour Party

Early general elections were held in Barbados on 6 September 1994. The result was a victory for the opposition Barbados Labour Party, which won 19 of the 28 seats, with its leader Owen Arthur becoming prime minister. The ruling Democratic Labour Party led by David Thompson was reduced to only eight seats. The National Democratic Party became the first third party to win a seat since the Barbados National Party in 1966, with NDP leader, Richard Haynes, winning St. Michael South Central. Voter turnout was 61%.

== Results ==
Party	Votes	%	Seats	+/–
Barbados Labour Party	60,504	48.34	19	+9
Democratic Labour Party	47,979	38.33	8	–10
National Democratic Party	15,980	12.77	1	+1
Independents	700	0.56	0	0
Total	125,163	100.00	28	0
Valid votes	125,163	99.48		
Invalid/blank votes	659	0.52		
Total votes	125,822	100.00		
Registered voters/turnout	206,642	60.89		
Source: Caribbean Elections
