= 1991 Barbadian general election =

- 22 January 1991

28 seats in the House of Assembly 15 seats needed for a majority
- Turnout: 63.72% (▼12.98pp)
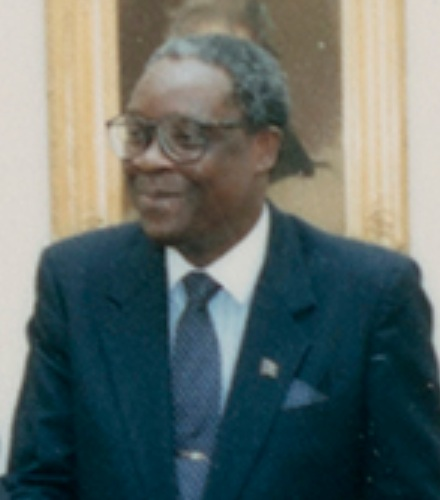

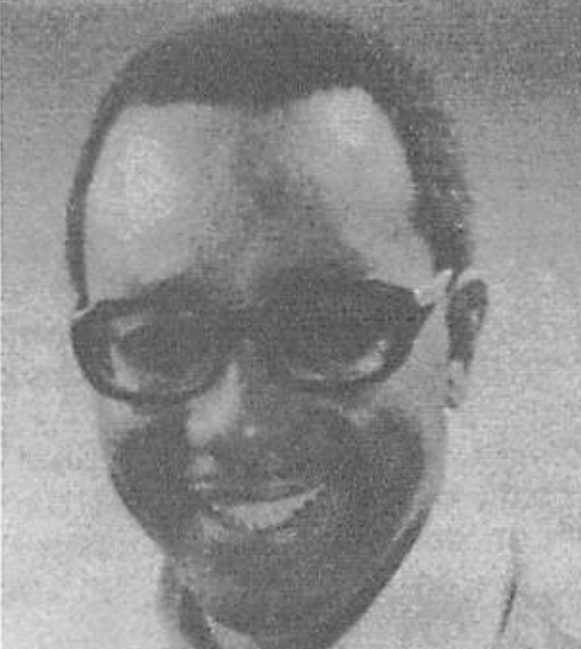
	First party	Second party
Leader	Erskine Sandiford	Henry Forde
Party	DLP	BLP
Last election	24 seats	3 seats
Seats won	18	10
Seat change	▼6	▲7
Popular vote	59,900	51,789
Percentage	49.77%	43.03%
Swing	▼9.68pp	▲2.66pp
- Results by constituency
Prime Minister before election
Lloyd Erskine Sandiford
DLP
Elected Prime Minister
Lloyd Erskine Sandiford
DLP

General elections were held in Barbados on 22 January 1991 to elect all 28 members (MPs) of the House of Assembly of Barbados. The result was a victory for the ruling Democratic Labour Party (DLP), which won 18 of the 28 seats. The opposition Barbados Labour Party led by Henry Forde won ten seats, an increase of seven compared to the 1986 elections. Voter turnout was 63.7%. DLP leader Lloyd Erskine Sandiford remained Prime Minister.

This was the first general election contested by the National Democratic Party (NDP), which had been founded in 1989 by four defecting DLP MPs, led by the former finance minister Richard Haynes. Despite polling nearly 7% of the national vote, all four lost their seats and no new NDP members were elected under Barbados' first-past-the-post electoral system.

== Results ==
Party	Votes	%	Seats	+/–
Democratic Labour Party	59,900	49.77	18	–6
Barbados Labour Party	51,789	43.03	10	+7
National Democratic Party	8,218	6.83	0	New
Independents	445	0.37	0	0
Total	120,352	100.00	28	+1
Valid votes	120,352	98.90		
Invalid/blank votes	1,344	1.10		
Total votes	121,696	100.00		
Registered voters/turnout	191,000	63.72		
Source: Nohlen
