= Barbados Labour Party =

Political party in Barbados

- Leader: Mia Mottley
- Chairperson: Reginald Farley
- General Secretary: Jerome Walcott
- Founder: Sir Grantley Adams
- Founded: 31 March 1938 (As the Barbados Progressive League)
- Headquarters: Grantley Adams House, 111 Roebuck Street, Bridgetown
- Youth wing: League of Young Socialists
- Ideology: Social democracy Republicanism; Asquithian liberalism
- Political position: Centre-left
- International affiliation: Socialist International (1987–2014); West Indies Federal Labour Party (1957–1961)
- Colours: Red and Gold
- House of Assembly: 30 / 30
- Senate: 12 / 21

Website
- www.blp.org.bb

The Barbados Labour Party is a political party in Barbados. It has served as the governing party of Barbados from 1954 to 1961, 1976 to 1986, 1994 to 2008, and since 2018.

The current Party Leader is Prime Minister Mia Amor Mottley, SC, MP while the Chairman is Reginald Farley, FB and General-Secretary is Dr. Jerome Walcott, FB, FRCS. Santia Bradshaw, MP is Deputy Prime Minister and Leader of Government Business in The House of Assembly, The Parliament of Barbados.

Former party leaders include Sir Grantley Adams, Dr. Hugh Gordon Cummins, Sir Harold Bernard St. John, Tom Adams, Sir Henry Forde and Professor Owen Arthur, PC.

Like Barbados' other major party, the Democratic Labour Party or the "Dems", the BLP has been broadly described as a centre-left social-democratic party, with local politics being largely personality-driven and responsive to contemporary issues and the state of the economy. However, the party distinguishes itself by being rooted in Asquithian Liberal policies, including a focus on trade as a way of bolstering economic growth over the creation of social services.

The BLP is a former observer member of the Socialist International.

== History ==
Originally called the Barbados Progressive League until 1944, the party was founded on 31 March 1938 at the home of James Martineau. During the first meeting, Chrissie Brathwaite and Grantley Adams were elected as chairman and vice-chairman, respectively. Adams had entered the House of Assembly in 1934 partly through his deconstruction of the labour-focused efforts of the Charles Duncan O'Neal's Democratic League, but this new party turned to organizing the political movement brought on by the unrest of 1937 that he had earlier opposed. As such, their objectives included many of the league's original goals, such as adult suffrage, free education, and better housing and health care.

The BLP first participated in general elections in 1940. In 1994, Owen Arthur became the prime minister as leader of the Barbados Labour Party. In the 2003 elections the BLP won 23 out of the 30 seats. The number increased to 24 in 2006, when in an almost unprecedented development the leader of the opposition, after a bitter and tumultuous internal battle within his own party, resigned the post and joined the governing party.

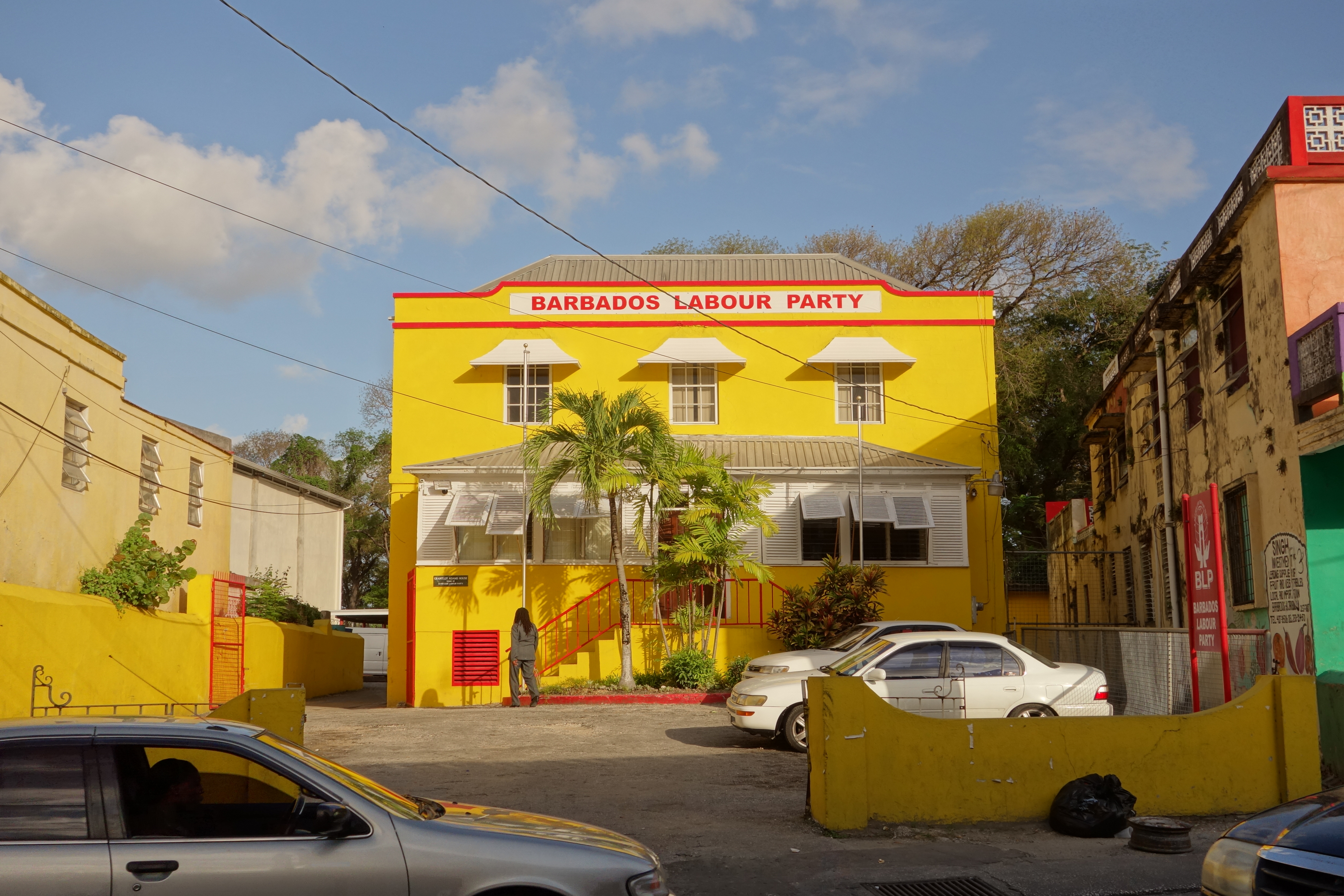
Grantley Adams House, the party's current headquarters, Bridgetown

The Barbados Labour Party governed from 1994 to 2008, which was commonly called the "Owen Arthur Administration". Prime Minister Arthur was chosen from among leaders around the globe to deliver the William Wilberforce lecture on the 200th anniversary of the Abolition of the Atlantic Slave Trade Act.

The party lost power in the 2008 general election, winning 10 seats against 20 for the Democratic Labour Party (DLP). After the election, Arthur stepped down as BLP leader and was replaced by former deputy prime minister Mia Mottley in a leadership election against Attorney-General of Barbados Dale Marshall. Mottley also became opposition leader.

In the summer of 2008 Hamilton Lashley, MP for St. Michael South East, resigned from the party to become an independent candidate in the House of Assembly. He was thereafter given a job by the DLP, the party he had belonged before crossing the floor to the BLP, as a consultant on poverty. This move by the member reduced to nine the number of seats the Barbados Labour Party had in the House.

After a decade in opposition, the BLP returned to power on 25 May 2018 under Mia Mottley, who became Barbados's first female prime minister. The party originally won all of the seats in the House of Assembly, but Bishop Joseph Atherley, the MP for St. Michael West, became an independent MP (later founder and leader of the People's Party for Democracy and Development) and the leader of the opposition on 2 June 2018.

In January 2022, the BLP obtained a landslide victory, winning all 30 legislative seats, in the first general election since Barbados became a republic in 2021.

In February 2024, BLP MP Ralph Thorne left the party, crossing the floor and becoming Leader of the Opposition. He joined the DLP shortly thereafter, becoming the party's leader its the first MP since 2018.

In the 2026 Barbadian general election on 11 February, the BLP again won all 30 seats in the House of Assembly.

== Electoral history ==
=== House of Assembly elections ===
Election	Party leader	Votes	%	Seats	+/–	Position	Result
1951	Grantley Herbert Adams	53,321	54.5%	15 / 24	▲15	▲1st	Majority government
1956	Grantley Herbert Adams	48,667	49.3%	15 / 24	Steady	1st	Majority government
1961	Hugh Gordon Cummins	40,096	36.8%	4 / 24	▼11	▼2nd	Opposition
1966	Grantley Herbert Adams	47,610	32.6%	8 / 24	▲4	2nd	Opposition
1971	Harold Bernard St. John	39,376	42.4%	6 / 24	▼2	2nd	Opposition
1976	Tom Adams	51,948	52.7%	17 / 24	▲11	▲1st	Supermajority government
1981	Tom Adams	61,883	52.2%	17 / 27	Steady	1st	Majority government
1986	Harold Bernard St. John	54,367	40.4%	3 / 27	▼14	▼2nd	Opposition
1991	Henry Forde	51,789	43.0%	10 / 28	▲7	2nd	Opposition
1994	Owen Arthur	60,504	48.3%	19 / 28	▲9	▲1st	Majority government
1999	Owen Arthur	83,445	64.9%	26 / 28	▲7	1st	Supermajority government
2003	Owen Arthur	69,294	55.9%	23 / 30	▼3	1st	Supermajority government
2008	Owen Arthur	61,316	46.5%	10 / 30	▼13	▼2nd	Opposition
2013	Owen Arthur	74,121	48.2%	14 / 30	▲4	2nd	Opposition
2018	Mia Mottley	112,955	73.5%	30 / 30	▲16	▲1st	Supermajority government
2022	Mia Mottley	78,960	69.3%	30 / 30	Steady	1st	Supermajority government
2026	Mia Mottley	71,109	69.8%	30 / 30	Steady	1st	Supermajority government

View source data.

=== West Indies election ===
Election	Party Group	Leader	Votes		Seats		Position	Government
Election	Party Group	Leader	No.	Share	No.	Share	Position	Government
1958	WIFLP	Grantley Herbert Adams	72,054	57.8%	4 / 5	80.0%	1st	WIFLP

== 2018 candidates ==
- Wilfred Abrahams (Christ Church East)
- William Duguid (Christ Church West)
- Rev. Joseph Atherley (St. Michael West)
- Colin Jordan (St. Peter)
- Jeffrey Bostic (The City of Bridgetown)
- Santia Bradshaw (St. Michael South East)
- Gline Clarke (St. George North)
- Adrian "Medic" Forde (Christ Church West Central)
- John King (St. Philip West)
- Ian Gooding-Edghill (St. Michael West Central)
- Cynthia Forde (St. Thomas)
- Marsha K. Caddle (St. Michael South Central)
- Charles Griffith (St. John)
- Edmund Hinkson (St. James North)
- Arthur Holder (St. Michael Central)
- Sandra Husbands (St. James South)
- Kirk Humphrey (St. Michael South)
- Dale Marshall (St. Joseph)
- Mia Mottley (St. Michael North East)
- Neil Rowe (St. Michael North West)
- George Payne (St. Andrew)
- Peter Phillips (St. Lucy)
- Trevor Prescod (St. Michael East)
- Ryan Straughn (Christ Church East Central)
- Dwight Sutherland (St. George South)
- Kerrie Symmonds (St. James Central)
- Ronald Toppin (St. Michael North)
- Dr. Ralph Thorne (Christ Church South)
- Sonia Browne (St. Philip North)
- Indar Weir (St. Philip South)

== Branches ==
The women's branch of the Barbados Labour Party is called the Women's League. The youth branch is called the League of Young Socialists.
