= Democratic Labour Party (Barbados) =

- Abbreviation: DLP
- Leader: David Estwick
- President: David Estwick
- Founder: Errol Barrow
- Founded: 27 April 1955
- Split from: Barbados Labour Party
- Headquarters: George Street, Belleville, St. Michael
- Ideology: Social democracy; Republicanism
- Political position: Centre-left
- International affiliation: West Indies Democratic Labour Party (1957–1961)
- House of Assembly: 0 / 30
- Senate: 1 / 21

Website
- www.dlpbds.org

The Democratic Labour Party (DLP), colloquially known as the "Dems", is a political party in Barbados, established in 1955. It was the ruling party administration from 15 January 2008 to 24 May 2018 but faced an electoral wipeout in the 2018 general election which left it with no members elected to the House of Assembly.

In common with Barbados' other major party, the Barbados Labour Party, the DLP has been broadly described as a centre-left social-democratic party, with local politics being largely personality-driven and responsive to contemporary issues and the state of the economy. Historically, the BLP claims a heritage from British liberalism, while the DLP was founded 11 years afterwards as a more left-leaning breakaway group.

== History ==
The DLP was founded in 1955 by Errol Barrow, James Cameron Tudor, Frederick "Sleepy" Smith and 26 others. Once members of the Barbados Labour Party (BLP), these 29 broke away to form this more left-leaning alternative. However, as a result of their common origin, the two parties have been and remain ideologically similar. In the 1956 general election the DLP received 19.9% of the vote and won four seats. In the following election in 1961 it received fewer votes than the BLP, but won a majority of the seats in Parliament, with Barrow becoming Premier.

After the party retained power in the 1966 election (this time with a plurality of the vote), Barrow became the country's first prime minister. The party won a third successive election in 1971, but lost power to the BLP in 1976. It remained in opposition until victory in the 1986 election, in which it won 24 of the 27 seats. The DLP remained in power following the 1991 election, but was defeated by the BLP in 1994. It returned to power again in the 2008 election, when DLP leader David Thompson became prime minister. Following his death in 2010, Freundel Stuart succeeded to the office, and led the party to a narrow election victory in 2013.

The 2018 election saw the DLP lose all of its MPs. Stuart stepped down as leader, and Verla De Peiza, unopposed in a leadership election held by the party on 1 August 2018, became his successor in the role of DLP leader and president.

After losing the 2022 election which resulted in the DLP not regaining any seats in the House of Assembly, De Peiza resigned on 21 January 2022. Ronnie Yearwood was then later elected DLP president after DLP elections took place on 1 May 2022.

Barbados Labour Party MP Ralph Thorne left the BLP in February 2024, becoming Leader of the Opposition. He joined the DLP shortly thereafter, becoming the party's leader and the party's first MP since 2018. Ronnie Yearwood remained as president of the party until his expulsion from the party along with Secretary General Steve Blackett on 24 August 2024 after a months-long inter-party dispute.

At the 2026 election, the BLP again swept every seat in the country, with Thorne losing his own seat. Following the results, Thorne stepped down as DLP leader. David Estwick, a member of the "old guard" of the DLP and a previous Minister of youth, culture and sport, was elected the new leader of the party, on 29th August 2028. He defeated rival member Stephen Lashley with 217-136 votes.

== Electoral history ==
=== House of Assembly elections ===
Election	Party leader	Votes	%	Seats	+/–	Position	Result
1956	Errol Barrow	19,650	19.9%	4 / 24	▲4	▲2nd	Opposition
1961	Errol Barrow	39,534	36.3%	15 / 24	▲11	▲1st	Majority government
1966	Errol Barrow	72,384	49.6%	14 / 24	▼1	1st	Majority government
1971	Errol Barrow	53,295	57.4%	18 / 24	▲4	1st	Supermajority government
1976	Errol Barrow	45,786	46.4%	7 / 24	▼11	▼2nd	Opposition
1981	Errol Barrow	55,845	47.1%	10 / 27	▲3	2nd	Opposition
1986	Errol Barrow	80,050	59.4%	24 / 27	▲14	▲1st	Supermajority government
1991	Erskine Sandiford	59,900	49.8%	18 / 28	▼6	1st	Majority government
1994	David Thompson	47,979	38.8%	8 / 28	▼10	▼2nd	Opposition
1999	David Thompson	45,118	35.1%	2 / 28	▼6	2nd	Opposition
2003	Clyde Mascoll	54,746	44.2%	7 / 30	▲5	2nd	Opposition
2008	David Thompson	70,135	53.2%	20 / 30	▲13	▲1st	Supermajority government
2013	Freundel Stuart	78,851	51.3%	16 / 30	▼4	1st	Majority government
2018	Freundel Stuart	33,551	21.8%	0 / 30	▼16	▼2nd	Extra-parliamentary
2022	Verla De Peiza	30,112	26.4%	0 / 30	Steady	2nd	Extra-parliamentary
2026	Ralph Thorne	27,808	27.3%	0 / 30	Steady	2nd	Extra-parliamentary

View source data.

=== West Indies election ===
Election	Party Group	Leader	Votes		Seats		Position	Government
Election	Party Group	Leader	No.	Share	No.	Share	Position	Government
1958	DLP	Errol Barrow	25,256	20.3%	0 / 5	0.0%	3rd	WIFLP
