= Monarchy of Barbados =

Queen of Barbados
- Coat of arms of Barbados

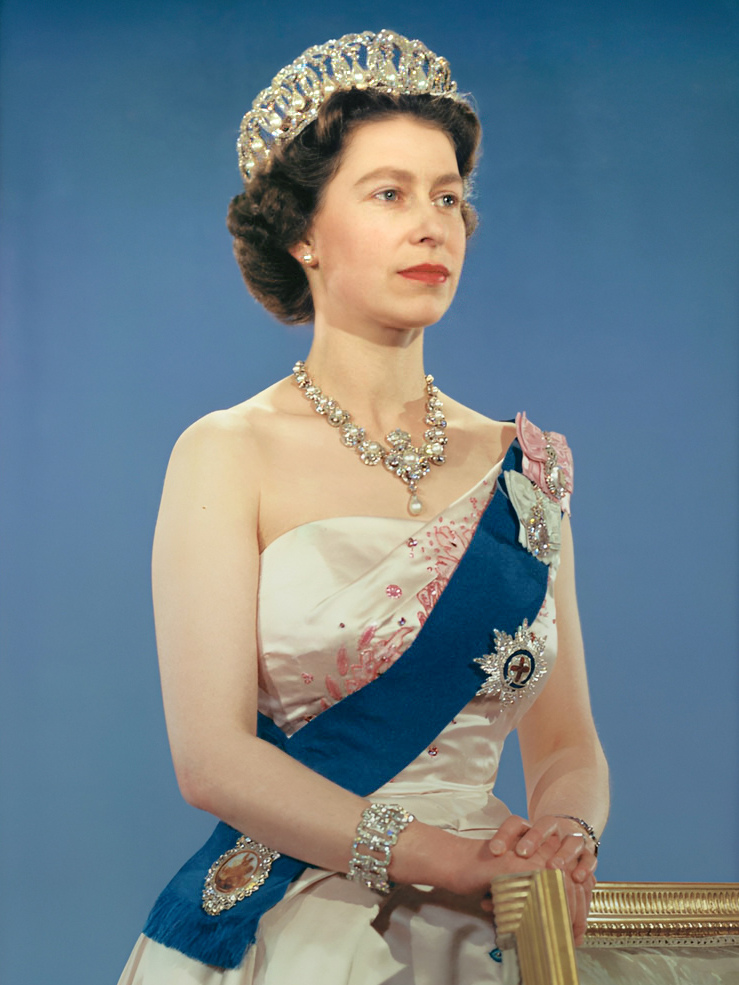
- Elizabeth II (only holder)

Details
- Style: Her Majesty
- Formed: 30 November 1966
- Abolished: 30 November 2021

The monarchy of Barbados was a system of government in which a hereditary monarch was the sovereign and head of state of Barbados from 1966 to 2021. Barbados shared the sovereign with the other Commonwealth realms, with the country's monarchy being separate and legally distinct. The monarch's operational and ceremonial duties were mostly delegated to her representative, the governor-general of Barbados.

The Barbados Independence Act 1966 transformed the colony of Barbados into the sovereign state of Barbados, with Elizabeth II as head of state. She was the only monarch from the independence of Barbados to the monarchy's abolition. As such, she was officially titled Queen of Barbados. The Barbadian Crown primarily functioned as a guarantor of continuous and stable governance and a nonpartisan safeguard against the abuse of power.

In September 2020, the Governor-General announced in the Throne Speech that Barbados would transition from a constitutional monarchy to a republic by the end of November 2021. The monarchy was abolished on 30 November 2021, when Barbados became a republic within the Commonwealth, with a president as its head of state.

== Origins ==
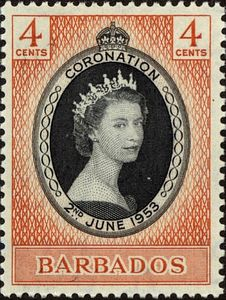
Coronation stamp, 1953

Monarchy in Barbados can trace its origins to the country's foundation as a colony, first of England, then as part of the British Empire. Barbados was claimed under King James I of England in 1625, though not colonised until 1627, when, in the name of King Charles I, Governor Charles Wolferstone established the first settlement on the island. By the 18th century, Barbados became one of the main seats of British authority in the British West Indies. Due to the economic burden of duties and trade restrictions, some Barbadians, including the Clerk of the General Assembly, attempted to declare in 1727 that the Act of Settlement 1701 had expired in the colony, since the Governor, Henry Worsley, had not received a new commission from King George II upon his accession to the throne. Thus, Barbadians refused to pay their taxes to a governor they recognised as having no authority. The Attorney and Solicitor General of Great Britain confirmed that Worsley was entitled to collect the dues owed. But, Worsley resigned his post before the directive arrived in Barbados.

After attempting in 1958 a federation with other West Indian colonies, Barbados continued as a self-governing colony under the Colonial Office until independence came with by Queen Elizabeth II signing the Barbados Independence Order in 1966. The Barbados Independence Act 1966, passed by the Parliament of the United Kingdom, transformed the Colony of Barbados into a sovereign state with an independent constitutional monarchy. The Queen's cousin, Prince Edward, Duke of Kent, represented her at the independence celebrations. On Independence Day, the Prince opened the second session of the first parliament, on behalf of the Queen.

== The Barbadian Crown and its aspects ==
The insignia of a Warrant Officer Class II of the Barbados Defence Force featuring the St Edward's Crown

Since Barbadian independence, the country's Crown had both a shared and a separate character, as the sovereign was equally shared with the other Commonwealth realms, while the sovereign's role as monarch of Barbados—represented by a viceroy, the governor-general of Barbados—was distinct to his or her position as monarch of any other realm, including the United Kingdom. (Note: The English Court of Appeal ruled in 1982, while "there is only one person who is the Sovereign within the British Commonwealth... in matters of law and government the Queen of the United Kingdom, for example, is entirely independent and distinct from the Queen of Canada.") Only Barbadian ministers of the Crown could advise the sovereign on matters of the Barbadian state. The monarchy thus ceased to be an exclusively British institution and, in Barbados, became a Barbadian, or "domesticated" establishment.

Since you became an independent country in 1966, you have continued to flourish and grow into a strong and confident nation. The extraordinary talents of your people, from the cricket field to the music industry have been admired and recognised throughout the world.

— Elizabeth II of Barbados, 2016

This division was illustrated in a number of ways: The sovereign, for example, held a unique Barbadian title and, when she was acting in public specifically as a representative of Barbados, she used, where possible, Barbadian symbols, including the country's national flag, and unique royal symbols. Per the Barbadian National Anthem law, upon arrival or departure of the sovereign or a member of the royal family, only the Barbadian national anthem (In Plenty and In Time of Need) was played.

A claim made by supporters of the monarchy was that it "keeps the line of stability open"; the sovereign's residence outside the country meant legitimate executive power would be unaffected by any hostile invasion of Barbados or other event that might render the entire sitting government incapacitated or otherwise unable to function. Such a situation did not arise; however, it may have helped had the Operation Red Dog invasion plot—which targeted the Commonwealth of Dominica and, likely, Barbados,—not been halted. (Note: During the 1990 Jamaat al Muslimeen coup attempt in nearby Trinidad and Tobago, all branches of government were successfully captured on the island, leading to the president and cabinet having to sign an amnesty to return toward governance.)

=== Title ===
Shortly after independence, Queen Elizabeth II, at the request of the Prime Minister of Barbados, adopted separate and distinct style and titles in her role as Queen of Barbados. Per a royal proclamation on 24 April 1967, later published in the Official Gazette of Barbados, the Queen's style and titles in relation to Barbados became: Elizabeth the Second, by the Grace of God, Queen of Barbados and of Her other Realms and Territories, Head of the Commonwealth.

This style reflected Barbados's status as an independent monarchy, highlighting the monarch's role specifically as Queen of Barbados, as well as the shared aspect of the Crown throughout the Commonwealth realms. Typically, the sovereign was styled "Queen of Barbados", and was addressed as such when in Barbados, or performing duties on behalf of Barbados abroad.

=== Succession ===
By convention, succession in Barbados was deferred to the laws of the United Kingdom; whoever was monarch of Britain was automatically also the monarch of Barbados. Succession in Britain is, for those born before 28 October 2011, by male-preference primogeniture and, for people born after 28 October 2011, by absolute primogeniture, governed by common law, the Act of Settlement 1701, Bill of Rights 1689, and Succession to the Crown Act 2013.

Though these laws still lie within the control of the British parliament, the United Kingdom cannot change the rules of succession without the unanimous consent of the other realms, unless explicitly leaving the shared monarchy relationship, which has been likened to a treaty among these countries. (Note: Justice Rouleau in a 2003 Ontario court ruling wrote that "Union under the... Crown together with other Commonwealth countries [is a] constitutional principle".) Barbados last indicated its consent to alteration to the line of succession in 2013, when the Barbadian Parliament passed the Succession to the Throne Act, 2013, which signified the legislature's acceptance to the British Succession to the Crown Bill 2013.

== Personification of the state ==
Barbados would, forever, be indebted to Her Majesty for providing that powerful and necessary symbol of continuity and assurance by remaining as the Head of State.

— Michael Carrington, Speaker of the House of Assembly of Barbados, 2012

The sovereign was regarded as the personification, or legal personality, of the Barbadian state. Therefore, the state was referred to as Her Majesty in Right of Barbados. The monarch, her position as sovereign, and not as an individual, was thus the owner of all state lands (called Crown lands), buildings and equipment (called Crown held property), as well as the copyright for all literary and artistic works (called Crown copyright). Government staff (the Civil Service) were also employed by the monarch or the governor-general, as were Supreme Court judges, members of the Barbados Defence Force, police officers, and senators.

The monarch was the locus of oaths of Allegiance, required of many employees of the Crown, as well as by new citizens, as per the Oath of Citizenship laid out in the Barbados Citizenship Act. This was done in reciprocation to the sovereign's Coronation Oath, wherein she promises to govern the peoples of her realms, "according to their respective laws and customs". The oath of allegiance in Barbados was:

"I, (name), do swear that I will be faithful and bear true allegiance to Her Majesty Queen Elizabeth II, Her Heirs and Successors, according to law. So help me God."

== Constitutional role and royal prerogative ==
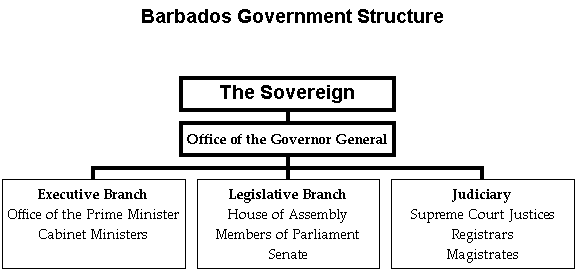
The structure of the Barbadian government, 1966-2021

The constitution of 1966 gave the country a similar parliamentary system of government to the other Commonwealth realms, wherein the role of the monarch and governor-general was both legal and practical, but not political. The Crown was regarded as a corporation, in which several parts shared the authority of the whole, with the sovereign as the person at the centre of the constitutional construct, meaning all powers of state were constitutionally reposed in the monarch. The constitution required most of the Queen's domestic duties to be performed by the governor-general, appointed by the monarch on the advice of the Prime Minister of Barbados.

All institutions of government acted under the sovereign's authority; the vast powers that belong to the Barbadian Crown were collectively known as the Royal Prerogative. Parliamentary approval was not required for the exercise of the Royal Prerogative; moreover, the consent of the Crown was sought before either of the houses of parliament may even debate a bill affecting the sovereign's prerogatives or interests.

The government of Barbados was also thus formally referred to as Her Majesty's Government. Further, the constitution instructed that any change to the position of the monarch, or the monarch's representative in Barbados, required the consent of two-thirds of all the members of each house of parliament.

=== Executive ===
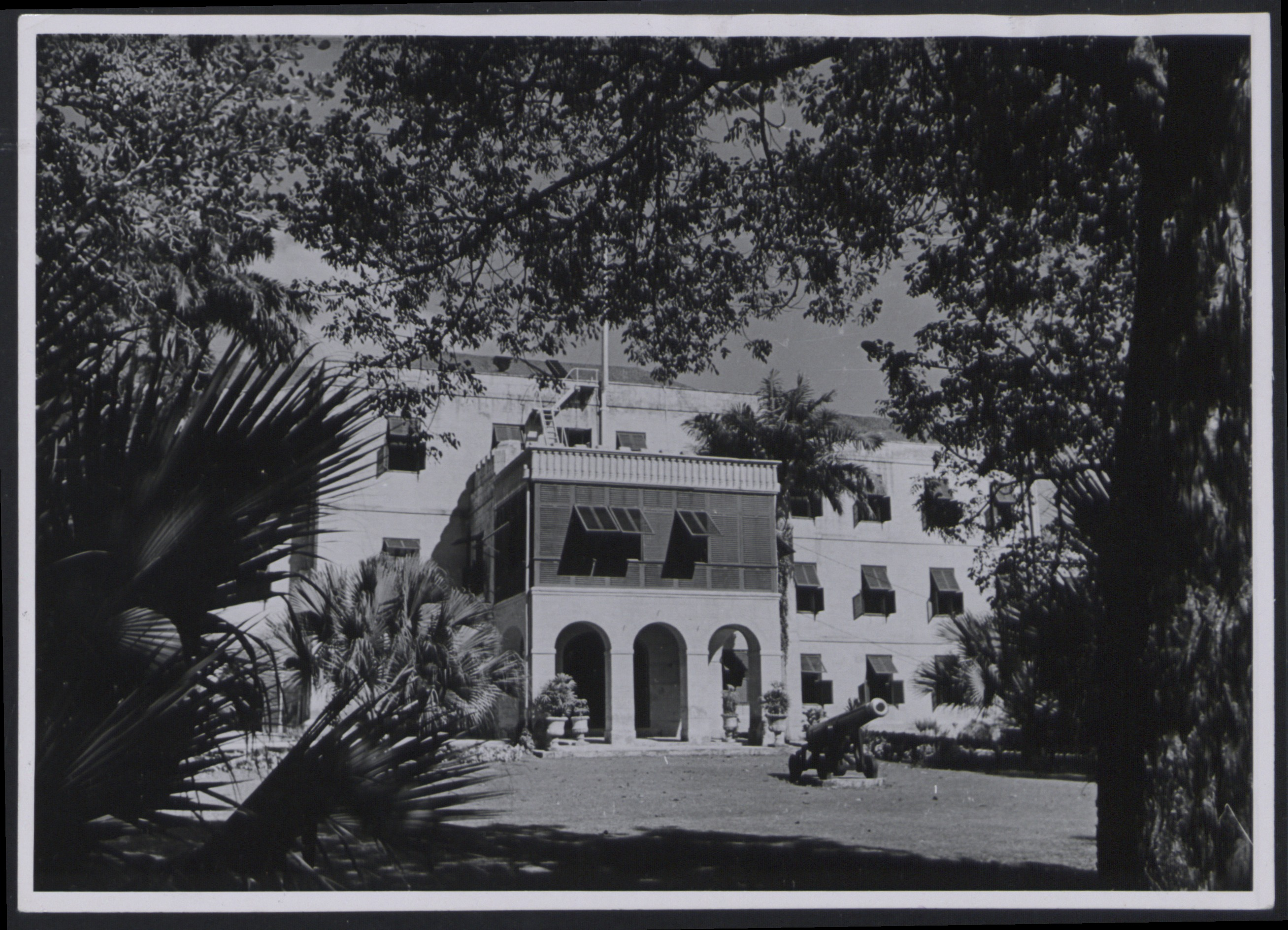
Government House, the residence of the governor-general of Barbados

One of the main duties of the Crown was to appoint a prime minister, who thereafter headed the Cabinet and advised the monarch or governor-general on how to execute their executive powers over all aspects of government operations and foreign affairs. The monarch's, and thereby the viceroy's role was almost entirely symbolic and cultural, acting as a symbol of the legal authority under which all governments and agencies operate, while the Cabinet directed the use of the Royal Prerogative, which included the privilege to declare war, maintain the Queen's peace, and direct the actions of the Barbados Defence Force, as well as to summon and prorogue parliament and call elections. The Royal Prerogative belonged to the Crown and not to any of the ministers, though it might have sometimes appeared that way, and the constitution allows the governor-general to unilaterally use these powers in relation to the dismissal of a prime minister, dissolution of parliament, and removal of a judge in exceptional, constitutional crisis situations.

There were also a few duties which were specifically performed by the Queen, such as appointing the governor-general, or the creation of Barbadian honours.

The governor-general, to maintain the stability of government, appointed as prime minister the individual most likely to maintain the support of the House of Assembly. The governor-general additionally appointed a Cabinet, at the direction of the prime minister, at least five other ministers of the Crown. The Queen was informed by her viceroy of the acceptance of the resignation of a prime minister and the swearing-in of a new prime minister and other members of the ministry, she remained fully briefed through regular communications from her Barbadian ministers, and she held regular audiences with them whenever possible. Members of various executive agencies and other officials are appointed by the Crown. The appointment of privy councillors, senators, and Supreme Court justices also fell under the Royal Prerogative.

=== Foreign affairs ===
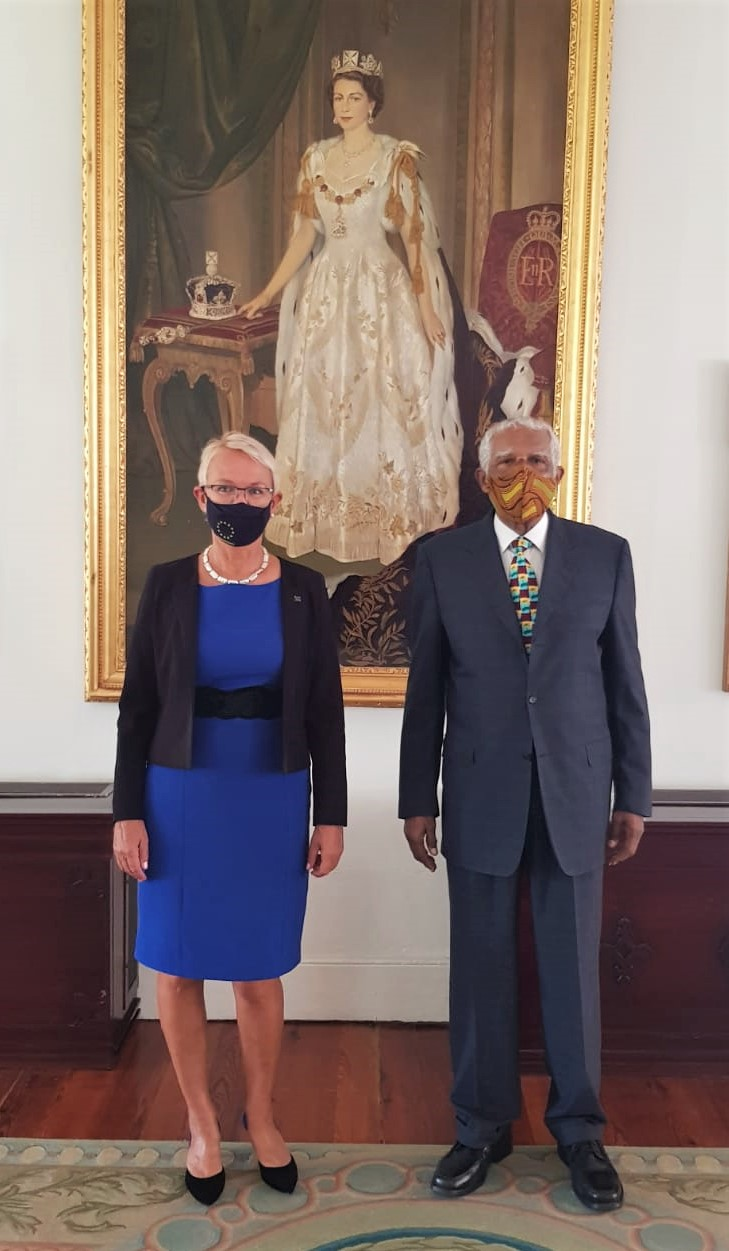
Sir Ken Hewitt, the Acting Governor-General of Barbados, and EU Ambassador Malgorzata Wasilewska stand under a portrait of Queen Elizabeth II, after Wasilewska presented her credentials to Hewitt

The Royal Prerogative further extended to foreign affairs: the governor-general ratified treaties, alliances, and international agreements. As with other uses of the Royal Prerogative, no parliamentary approval was required. However, a treaty couldn't alter the domestic laws of Barbados; an Act of Parliament was necessary in such cases. The governor-general, on behalf of the Queen, also accredited Barbadian High Commissioners and ambassadors and received diplomats from foreign states. In addition, the issuance of passports fell under the Royal Prerogative and, as such, all Barbadian passports were issued in the governor-general's name, the monarch's representative in Barbados.

=== Parliament ===
The sovereign, along with the Senate and the House of Assembly, was one of the three components of the Barbadian parliament. The authority of the Crown therein was embodied in the mace, which bore a crown at its apex; unlike other realms, however, the Barbados parliament only had a mace for the lower house.

The monarch did not, however, participate in the legislative process; the viceroy did, though only in the granting of Royal Assent. Further, the constitution outlined that the governor-general alone was responsible for appointing senators. The Governor-General made twelve senatorial appointments on the advice of the prime minister, two on the advice of leader of the opposition and seven at his own discretion. The Governor-General additionally summoned, prorogued, and dissolved parliament; after the latter, the writs for a general election were usually dropped by the governor-general at Government House.

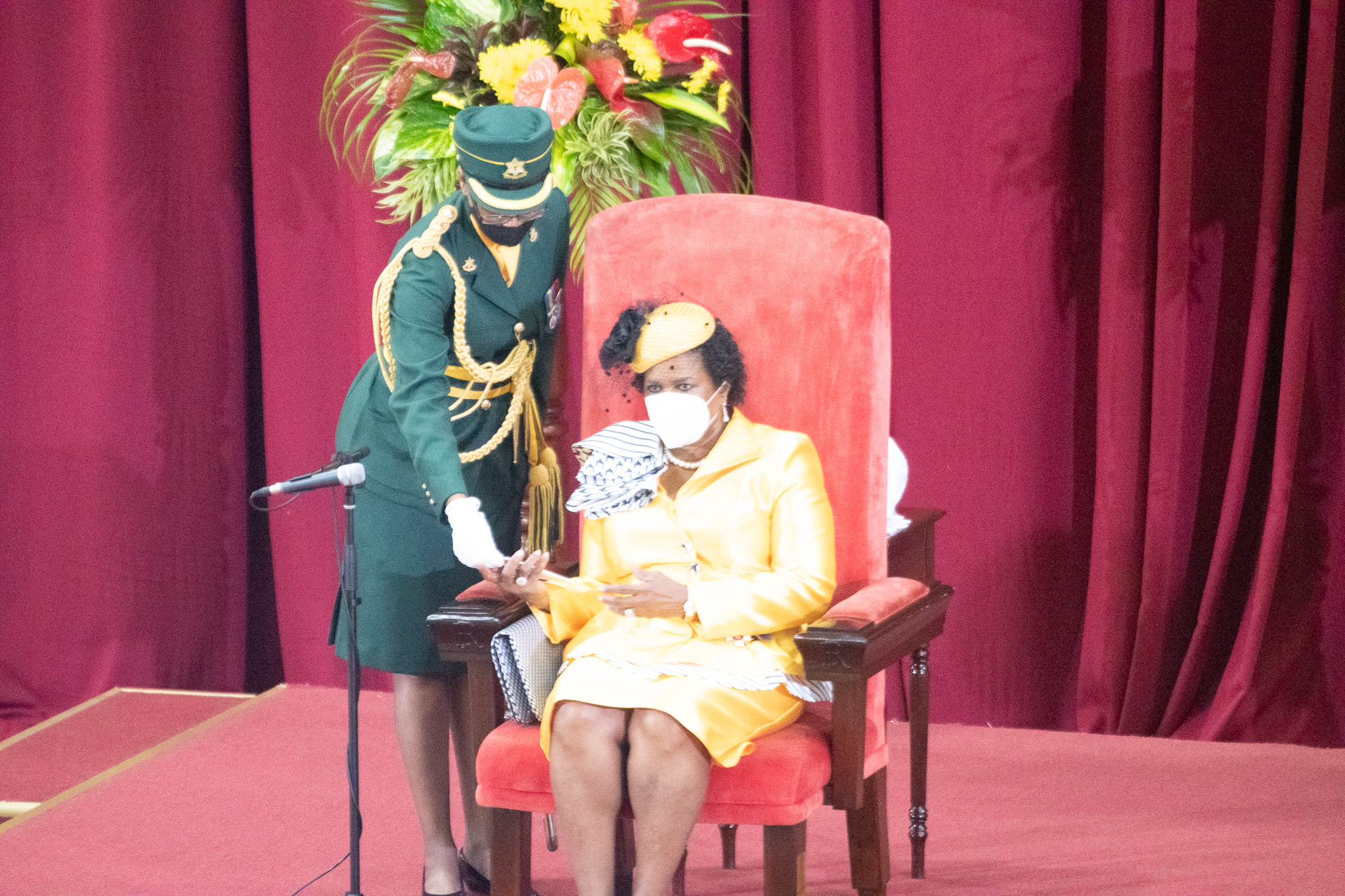
The Governor-General receiving the Throne Speech at the State Opening of Parliament, 2020

The new parliamentary session was marked by the Opening of Parliament, during which the monarch or the governor-general read the Speech from the Throne. As the monarch and the viceroy couldn't enter the House of Assembly, the Throne Speech took place in the Senate chamber; Members of Parliament were summoned to these ceremonies from the Commons by the Crown's messenger, after he knocked on the doors of the lower house that were slammed closed on him, to symbolise the barring of the monarch from the assembly.

All laws in Barbados were enacted only with the Governor-General's granting of Royal Assent in the monarch's name. Thus, bills began with the phrase: "Be it enacted by the Queen's Most Excellent Majesty, by and with the advice and consent of the Senate and House of Assembly of Barbados and by the authority of the same as follows". The Royal Assent, and proclamation, were required for all acts of parliament, usually granted or withheld by the Governor-General, with the Public Seal of Barbados.

=== Courts ===
Within the Commonwealth realms, the sovereign is responsible for rendering justice for all her subjects, and is thus traditionally deemed the fount of justice. In Barbados, criminal offences were legally deemed to be offences against the sovereign and proceedings for indictable offences are brought in the sovereign's name in the form of The Queen versus [Name]. Hence, the common law held that the sovereign "can do no wrong"; the monarch cannot be prosecuted in his or her own courts for criminal offences.

The monarch, and by extension the governor-general, on the advice of the Barbadian Cabinet, could also grant immunity from prosecution, exercise the royal prerogative of mercy, and pardon offences against the Crown, either before, during, or after a trial. The exercise of the 'Prerogative of mercy' to grant a pardon and the commutation of prison sentences is described in section 78 of the 1966 Constitution.

All Barbadian judges had to swear that they would "well and truly serve" the monarch of Barbados, on taking office. Under the Constitution, the Judicial Oath was:

"I, (name), do swear that I will well and truly serve Our Sovereign Lady Queen Elizabeth II, Her Heirs and Successors, in the office of the Chief Justice/Justice of Appeal/Judge of the High Court and I will do right to all manner of people after the laws and usages of Barbados without fear or favour, affection or ill will. So help me God."

However, the monarch did not personally rule in judicial cases; instead, judicial functions were performed in her name. In international cases, as a sovereign and under established principles of international law, the Queen of Barbados was not subject to suit in foreign courts without her express consent. In addition, the monarch also served as a symbol of the legitimacy of courts of justice and of their judicial authority. An image of the Queen or the Coat of arms of Barbados was always displayed in Barbadian courtrooms. Judges also had a pair of white gloves from the Queen on display on the edge of the bench, which marked the authority of the court, similar to the ceremonial mace of parliament.

Any attempt to kill the monarch or the governor-general was considered "high treason", and the person guilty of the offence was sentenced to death.

== Cultural role ==
=== The Crown and Honours ===
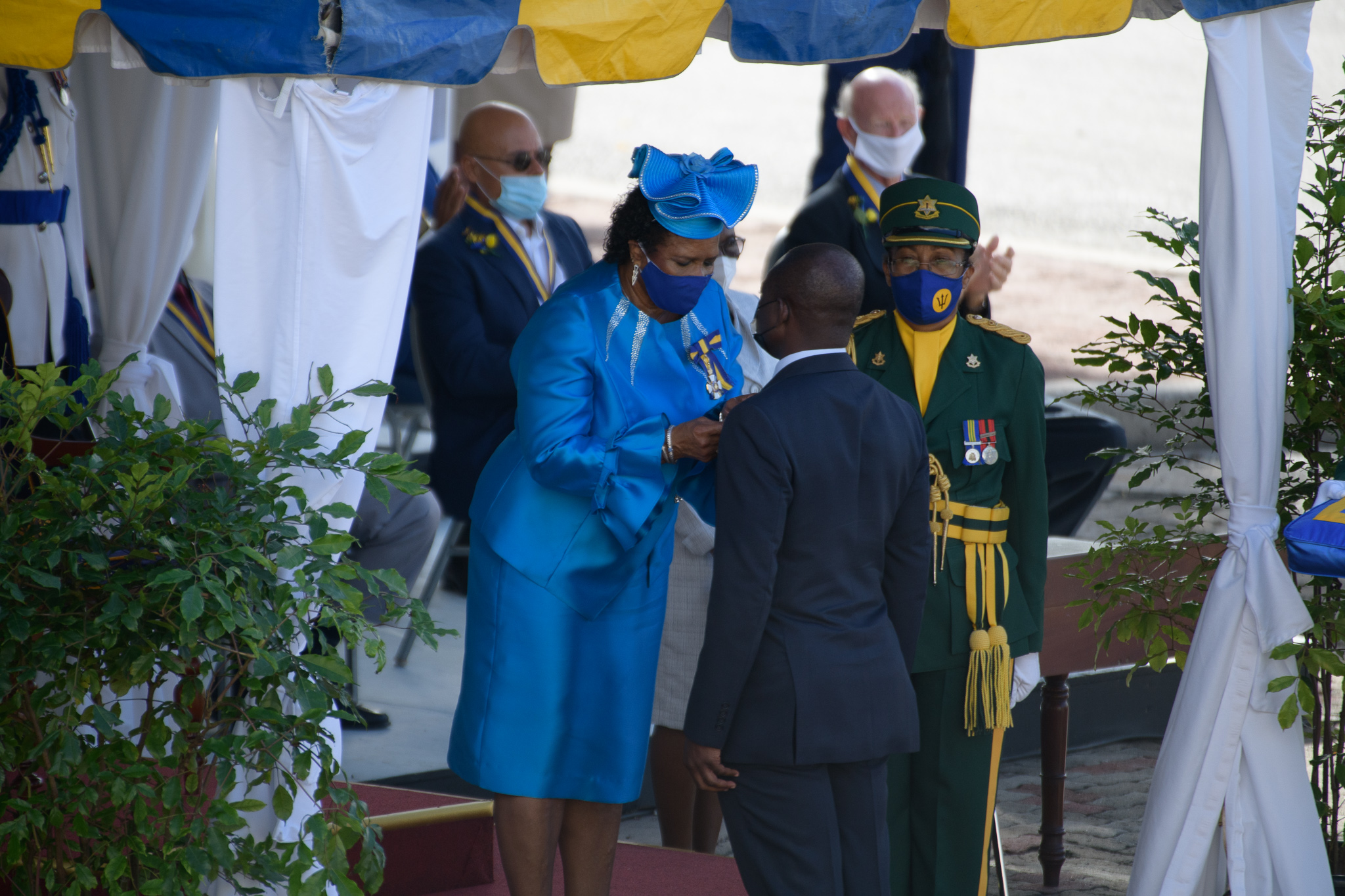
The monarch's representative, the Governor-General, conferring honours during the National Awards Ceremony at the Independence Day Parade, 2020

Within the Commonwealth realms, the monarch is deemed the fount of honour. Similarly, the monarch, as Sovereign of Barbados, conferred awards and honours in Barbados in her name. Most of them were often awarded on the advice of "Her Majesty's Barbados Ministers".

The Barbadian National Honours system was established in 1980 by warrant of the Queen of Barbados under a royal sign manual.

=== The Crown and the Defence Force ===
The rank insignia of a Barbadian Colonel (left), Lieutenant-Colonel (centre), and Major (right) of the Barbadian Defence Force featuring the St Edward's Crown

The monarch of Barbados was the Commander-in-Chief of the Barbados Defence Force.

The Crown sat at the pinnacle of the Barbados Defence Force. It was reflected in Barbados's naval vessels, which bore the prefix HMBS, i.e., Her Majesty's Barbadian Ship.

St Edward's Crown appeared on Barbados Defence Force regimental and maritime badges and rank insignia, which illustrated the monarchy as the locus of authority.

Every member of the Barbados Defence Force had to swear allegiance to the monarch on taking office. The oath was:

"I, (name), swear by Almighty God that I will be faithful and bear true allegiance to Her Majesty Queen Elizabeth the Second, Her Heirs and Successors, and that I will, as in duty bound, honestly and faithfully defend Her Majesty, Her Heirs and Successors, in person, crown and dignity against all enemies, and will observe and obey all orders of Her Majesty, Her Heirs and Successors, and of the officers set over me."

Queen's Colour of the Barbados Regiment

Queen's Colour of the Barbados Regiment

The Queen's Colour of the Barbados Regiment was carried only when a guard was mounted for the Queen of Barbados, the royal family, and the governor-general of Barbados. Mary, Princess Royal and Countess of Harewood, presented the regiment with its first stand of Colours on 23 February 1953. The Queen's Colour was paraded in Trooping the Colour for the first time on 19 February 1975, in the presence of the Queen. It was also trooped on 21 November 1987 to mark the 21st anniversary of Barbadian Independence, and on 4 June 2012 during the parade in honour of the Diamond Jubilee of Queen Elizabeth II.

=== The Crown and the Police Force ===
The rank insignia of a Barbadian Senior Superintendent (left) and Station Sergeant (right) of the Barbadian Police Force featuring the St Edward's Crown

The Barbadian Police Force was known as "The Royal Barbados Police Force". The prefix "Royal" was granted by the Queen during her visit in February 1966. The name was changed to "Barbados Police Service", when the monarchy was abolished in 2021.

Every member of the Royal Barbados Police Force had to swear allegiance to the monarch of Barbados, on taking office. Under the Police Act of Barbados, the oath of office was:

"I, (name), do hereby swear by Almighty God and do hereby solemnly and sincerely affirm that I will be faithful and bear true allegiance to Her Majesty Queen Elizabeth the Second, Her Heirs and Successors, and that I will faithfully serve Her Majesty the Queen, Her Heirs and Successors during my service in the Royal Barbados Police Force; that I will subject myself to all Acts, orders and regulations relating to the said Force now in force or which may from time to time be in force and will discharge all the duties of a police officer according to law, without fear or favour, affection or ill-will."

=== Barbadian royal symbols ===
From the beginning of Queen Elizabeth II's reign onwards, royal symbols in Barbados were altered to make them distinctly Barbadian or new ones created, such as the Coat of arms of Barbados (presented on 14 February 1966 by the Queen to then President of the Senate Sir Grey Massiah) and the Queen's Royal Standard for Barbados, created in 1975. Second in precedence was the personal flag of the governor-general.

The main symbol of the monarchy was the sovereign herself. Thus, framed portraits of her were displayed in public buildings and government offices. A portrait of the Queen also greeted visitors in the immigration queue at the airport in Bridgetown. The Queen also appeared on commemorative Barbadian stamps. A crown was also used to illustrate the monarchy as the locus of authority, appearing on police force, postal workers, prison officers, and Barbados Defence Force regimental and maritime badges and rank insignia, as well as Barbadian honours, the system of such created through Letters Patent issued by Queen Elizabeth II in July 1980.

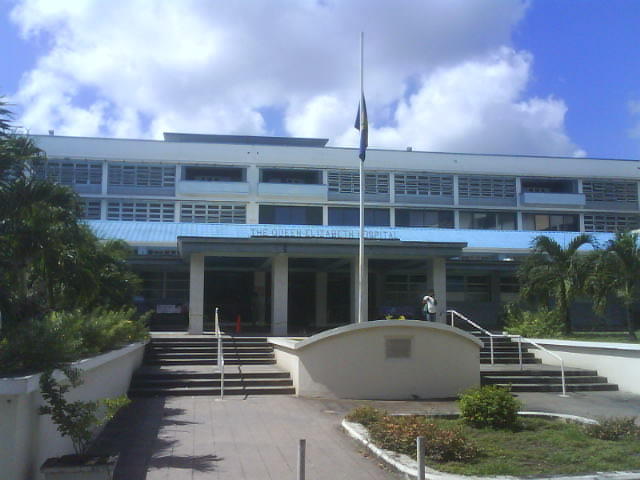
The Queen Elizabeth Hospital, Bridgetown

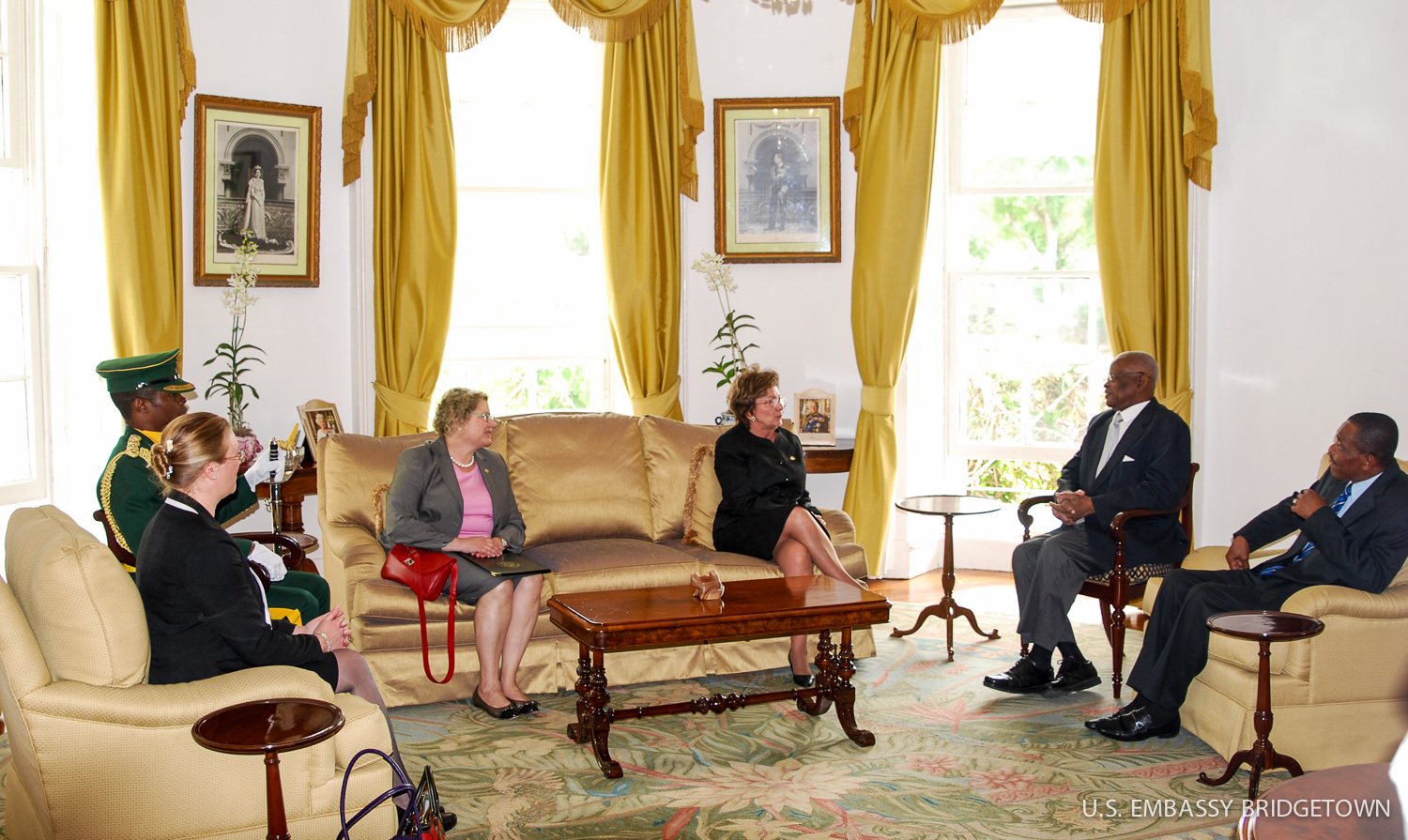
Portraits of the Queen and Prince Philip displayed at Government House, Bridgetown

Flag of the Barbadian Governor-General featuring the St Edward's Crown

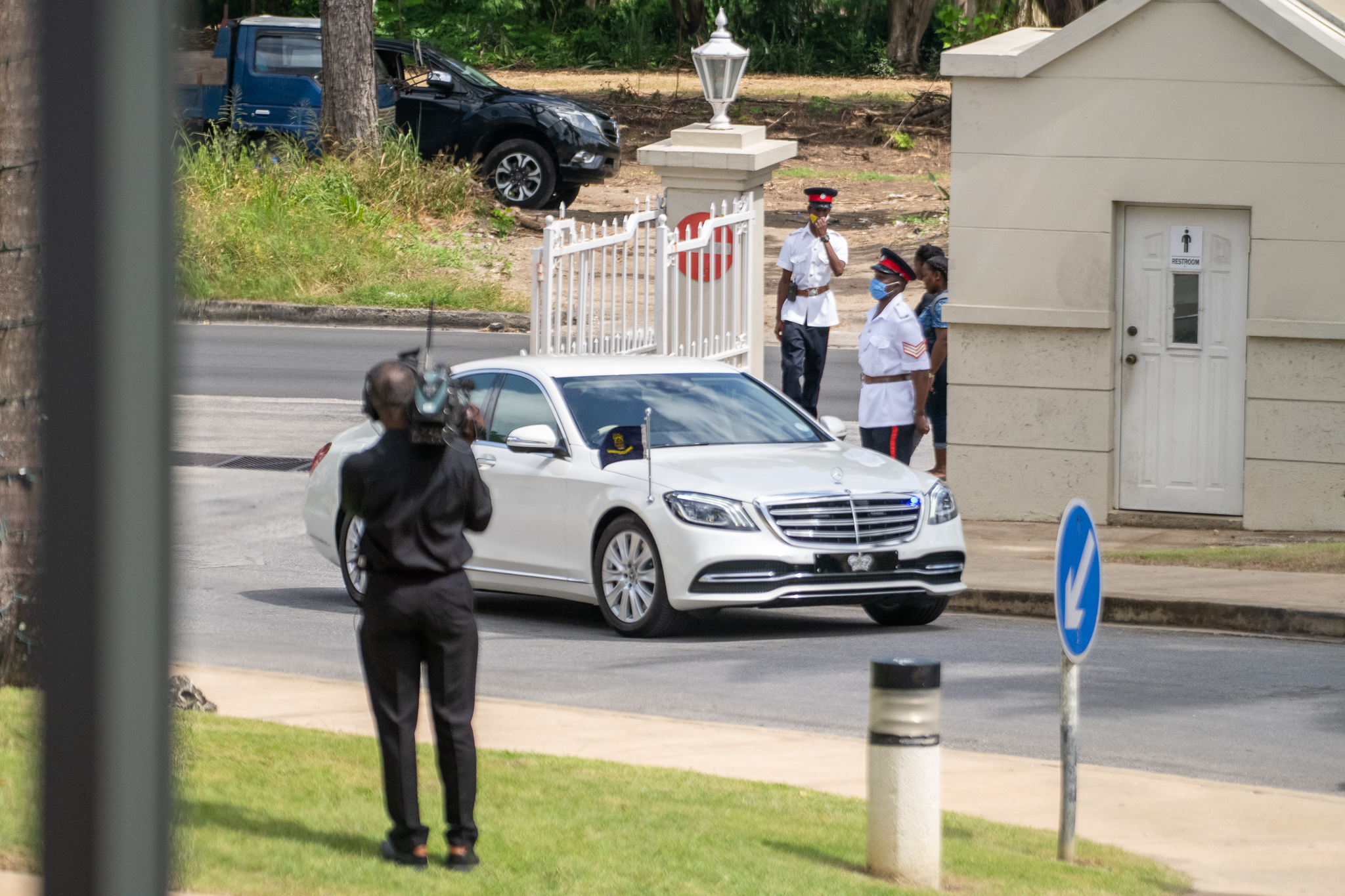
The Governor-General's car flying the flag, and displaying a crown on the number plate

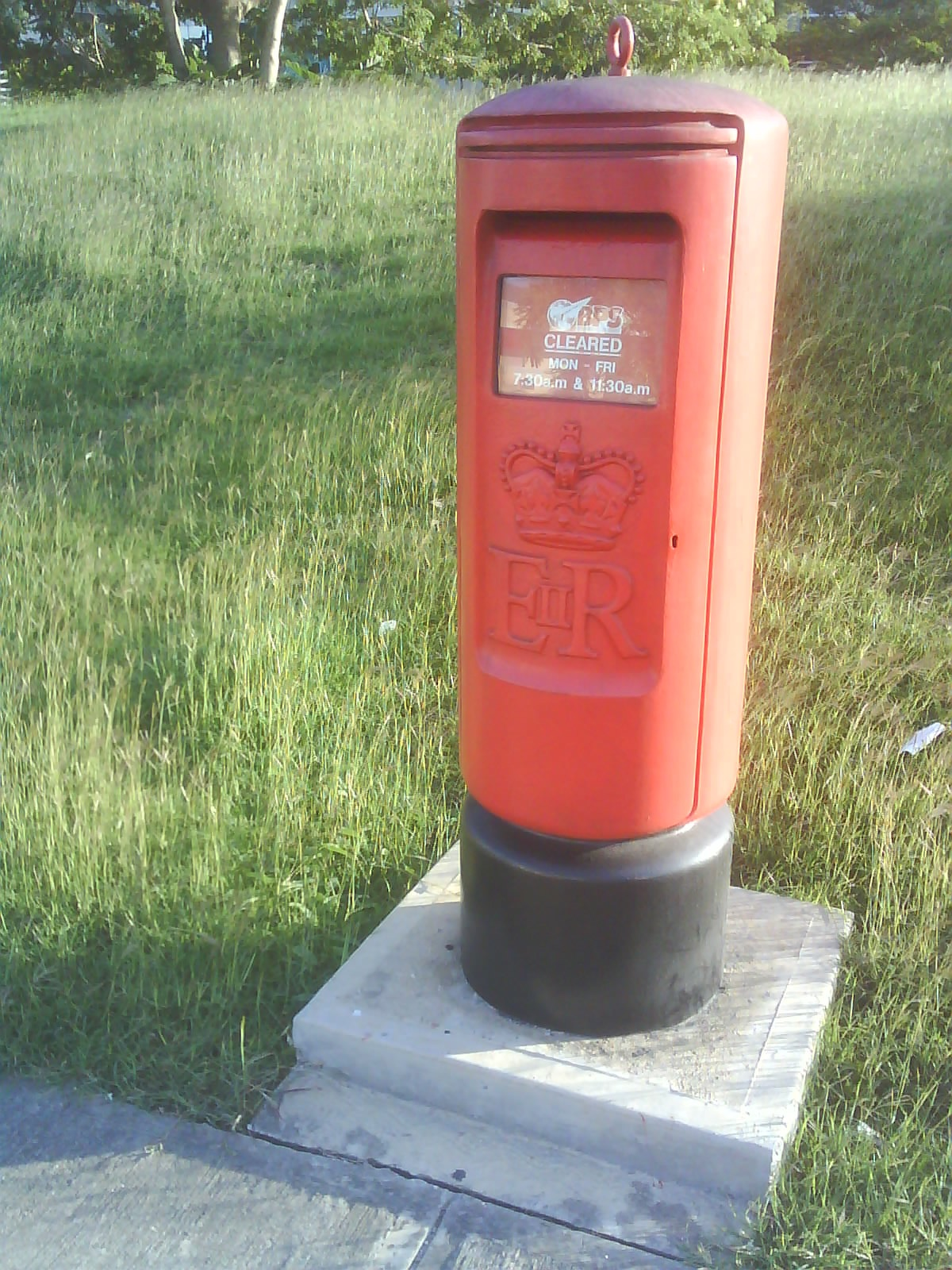
A post box in Barbados featuring the royal cypher of Queen Elizabeth II

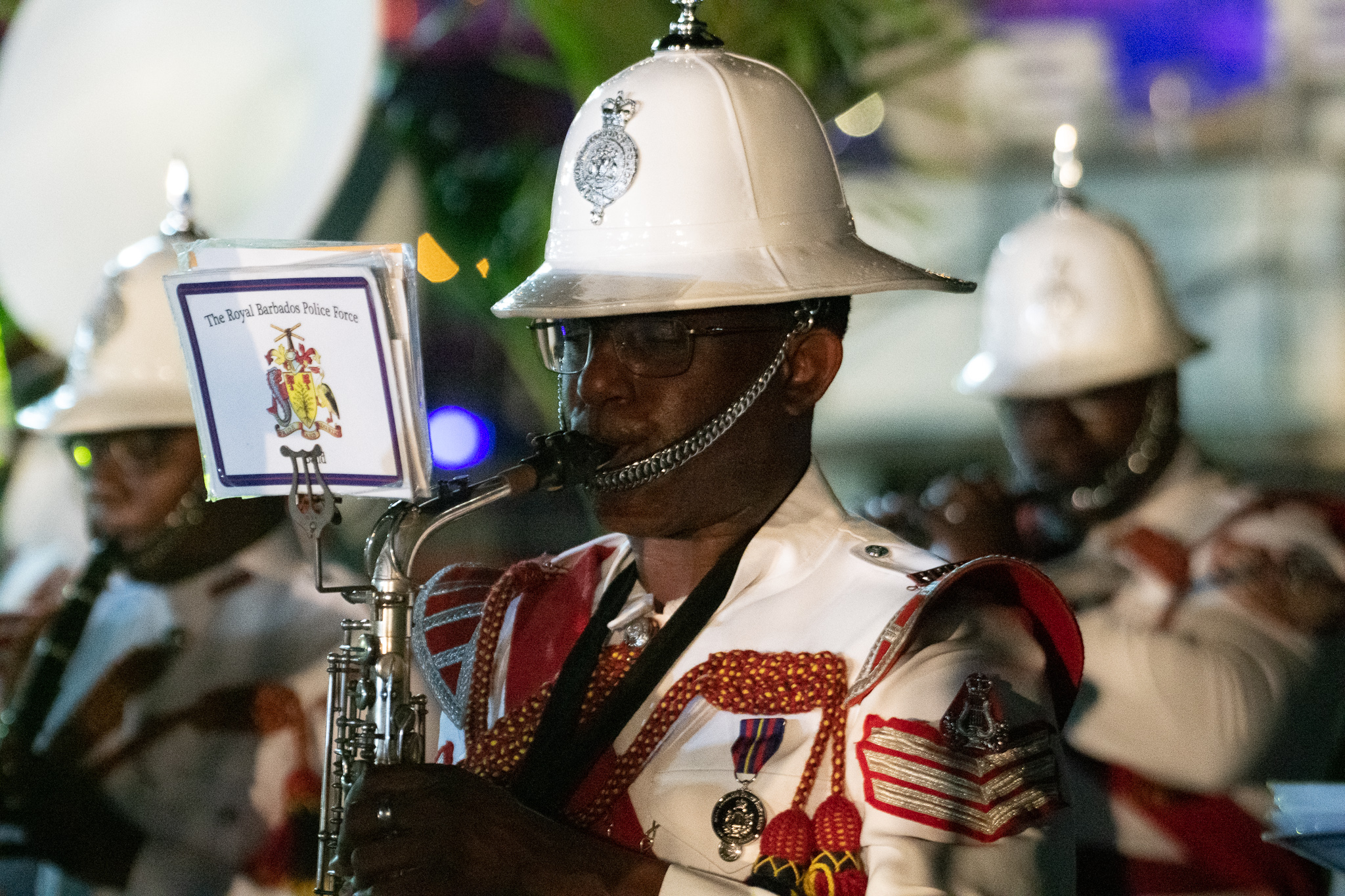
The headgear of members of the Royal Barbados Police Force featuring the St Edward's Crown

Queen's Personal Barbadian Flag

Elizabeth II had a personal Barbadian standard, in her role as Queen of Barbados. It was first used when the Queen visited Barbados in 1975. The standard consisted of a yellow field with a bearded fig tree, a long-established symbol of the island of Barbados, and the national flower the Pride of Barbados flowers in each of the upper corners. A blue disc of the letter "E" crowned surrounded by a garland of gold roses was displayed prominently on the flag within the centre of the tree.

Standard of Elizabeth II as Queen of Barbados

=== Royal visits ===
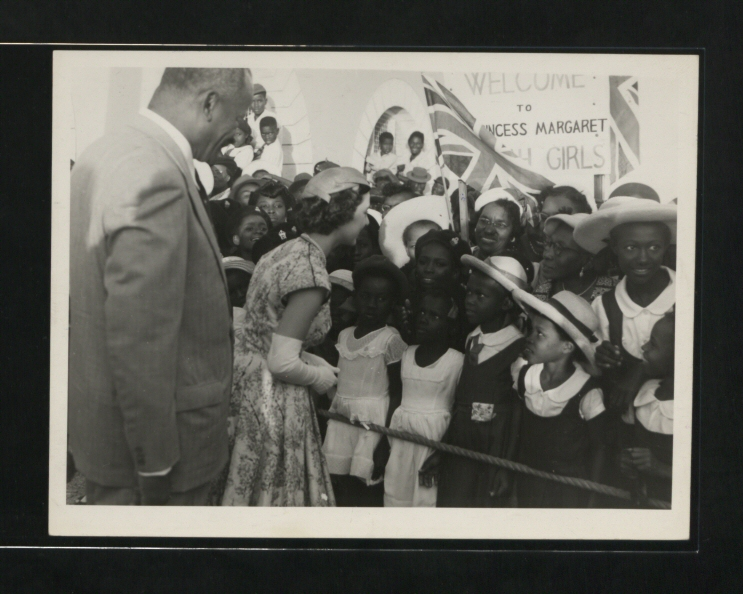
Princess Margaret at the opening of The Princess Margaret School in Barbados, 1955

In February 1966, the Queen, along with her husband, the Duke of Edinburgh, toured Barbados, opening Barclays Park, in Saint Andrew, amongst other events. During her 1975 visit, the Queen knighted Barbadian cricketer Sir Garfield Sobers in an open-air investiture before a crowd of 50,000 in Bridgetown. The Queen returned for her Silver Jubilee in 1977, after addressing the new session of parliament, she departed on the Concorde, which was the Queen's first supersonic flight. She also was in Barbados in 1989, to mark the 350th anniversary of the establishment of the Barbados parliament, where she received addresses from both houses.

Most significant of all your achievements, is the success with which you have nourished and brought to maturity, through many painful experiences, a constitutional system of democratic government, from which others have much to learn. For these reasons I am proud and happy to be your Queen, and I prạy that God may bless your national endeavours.

— Elizabeth II of Barbados, 1989

In 2010, Prince Harry visited Barbados to launch the first Sentebale Polo Cup, and to raise awareness and funding for Sentebale's work.

To mark the Queen's Diamond Jubilee in 2012, the country hosted the Queen's youngest son and his wife, the Earl and Countess of Wessex, between 23 and 24 February 2012. To a joint sitting of the Parliament of Barbados, the Earl read a written message from the Queen, in which the monarch stated she has taken note of the level of development Barbados had achieved during its 45 years of independence and called the country a model small state for others around the world.

The Princess Royal visited in 2015. In 2016, Prince Harry visited Barbados on behalf of the Queen, for Barbados's 50th anniversary of independence celebrations. The Queen shared person congratulations to the people and government of Barbados on reaching 50 years of political independence and touched on her family's fondness of Barbados and witnessing development of nation over that time. In her message, the Queen praised Barbadians and said they "have continued to flourish and grow into a strong and confident nation. The extraordinary talents of your people, from the cricket field to the music industry have been admired and recognised throughout the world". In March 2019, Charles, Prince of Wales and Camilla, Duchess of Cornwall visited Barbados.

== Republicanism ==
Former Prime Minister Owen Arthur called for a referendum on becoming a republic to be held in 2005. It was announced on 26 November 2007 that the referendum would be held in 2008, together with the general election. On 2 December 2007, reports emerged that this vote was put off due to concerns raised by the Electoral and Boundaries Commission. Following the election, David Thompson replaced Arthur as prime minister.

On 22 March 2015, Prime Minister Freundel Stuart announced his intention to move the country towards a republican form of government "in the very near future". The general secretary of the Democratic Labour Party, George Pilgrim, confirmed the move and said that it is expected to coincide with the 50th anniversary of Barbadian independence in 2016. According to the country's constitution, a two-thirds majority in parliament is needed to authorize the change; The Democratic Labour Party had a two-thirds majority in the Senate, but not in the House of Assembly.

=== Abolition ===
In September 2020, the Barbados Labour Party government of Prime Minister Mia Mottley announced in its Throne Speech that Barbados would become a republic by November 2021, replacing the Queen and Governor-General with a president with the same powers and functions as the monarch. The Barbados Labour Party had a two-thirds majority in both houses of the Barbadian parliament.

On 20 September 2021, the Constitution (Amendment) (No. 2) Bill, 2021 was introduced to the Parliament of Barbados. Passed on 6 October, the Bill made the following amendments to the Constitution of Barbados:

- All references in the law of Barbados to Her Majesty the Queen, the Crown, and the Sovereign shall be read and construed as referring to the State;
- All references to the Governor-General shall be read and construed as referring to the President of Barbados;
- All references to "Her Majesty's dominions" shall be read and construed as a reference to the Commonwealth of Nations.
- Vesting the prerogatives or privileges of the Crown or Sovereign in the State, subject to the Constitution;
- Vesting all the rights and privileges of the Governor-General in the President;
- Vesting all property held by the Crown in the State;
- Electing the first President in a joint sitting of the Parliament of Barbados by the joint nomination of the Prime Minister of Barbados and Leader of the Opposition by 15 October 2021 with the person elected to take office on 30 November 2021;
- Following the end of the first President's term, future presidents would be elected by either a joint nomination of the Prime Minister and Leader of the Opposition or if there is no joint nomination, a vote of both houses of the Parliament of Barbados where a two-thirds majority is required;
- President to serve a term of four years;
- All the powers of the Governor-General transferred to the President;
- Amending the official oaths of Barbados to remove references to the Queen.

The title 'Royal' would be removed from all institutions that have it in their name. Barristers would no longer be appointed as Queen's Counsel - but most likely be appointed Senior Counsel. Existing designations were not affected, but became King's Counsel upon the death of Queen Elizabeth II on 8 September 2022.

The decision to become a republic without holding a referendum on the issue was criticised.

Governor-General Dame Sandra Mason was on 12 October 2021 jointly nominated by the prime minister and leader of the opposition as candidate for the first president of Barbados, and was subsequently elected by parliament on 20 October.

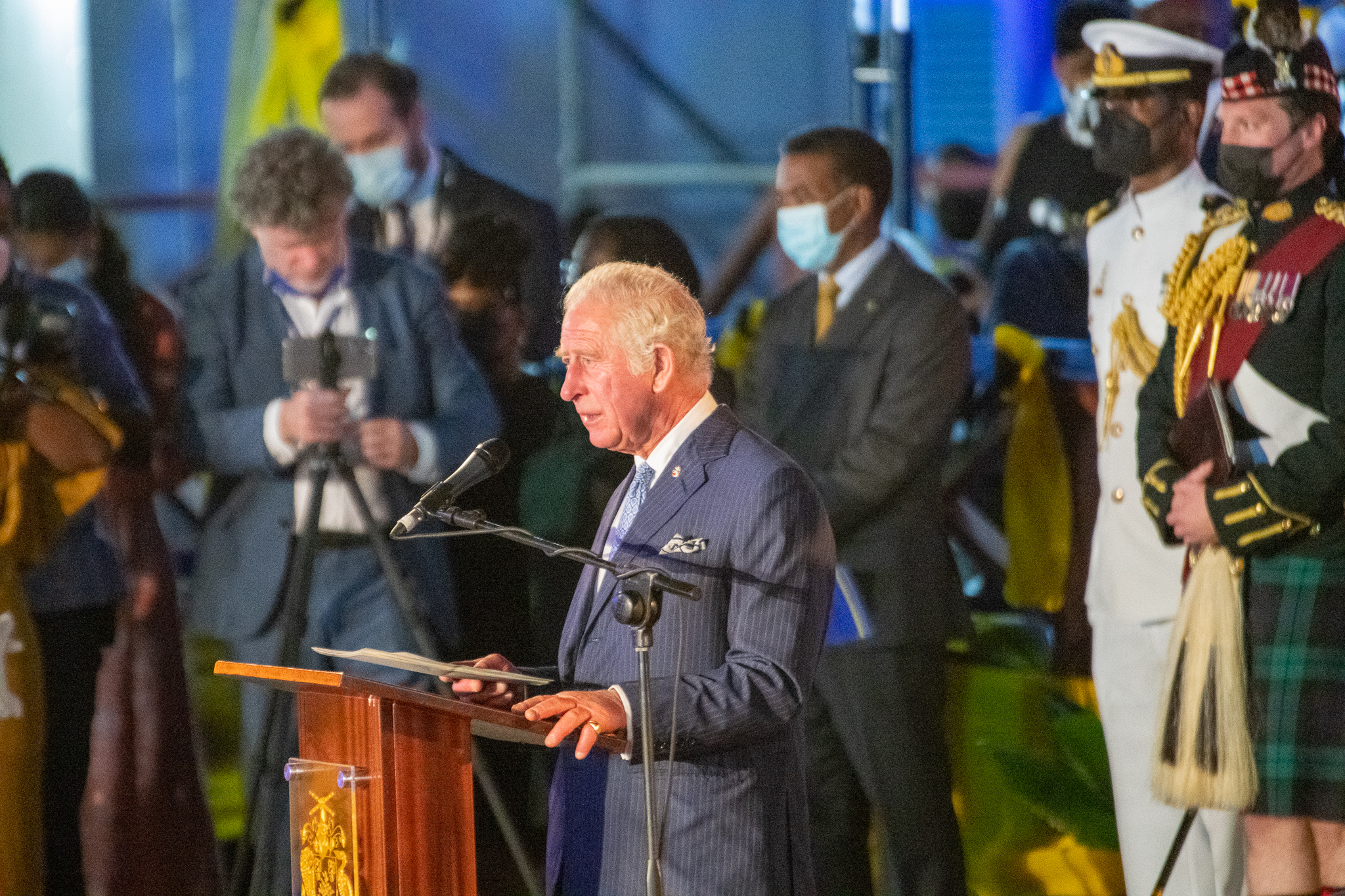
Charles, Prince of Wales, delivering a speech in Bridgetown, after Barbados became a republic

The monarchy was abolished on 30 November 2021. Dame Sandra Mason was sworn in as the first president of the newly formed republic. In a message to Mason, Queen Elizabeth II sent her congratulations and wished Barbadians happiness, peace, and prosperity for the future. Invited by Prime Minister Mia Mottley, Charles, Prince of Wales, as future head of the Commonwealth, attended the Republic Day events and celebrations in Bridgetown. It was the first time that a member of the royal family had attended the transition of a Commonwealth realm to a republic. The Prince was awarded the Order of Freedom of Barbados and undertook some public engagements.

Before 2007, a Commonwealth realm transitioning to a republic had to reapply for membership in the Commonwealth of Nations. As this is no longer the case, Barbados became the first country to remain a member having ceased to be a Commonwealth realm without having to reapply for Commonwealth membership.

== Monarch ==
Portrait	Regnal name (Birth–Death)	Reign over Barbados		Full name	Consort	House
Portrait	Regnal name (Birth–Death)	Start	End	Full name	Consort	House
	Elizabeth II (1926–2022)	30 November 1966	30 November 2021	Elizabeth Alexandra Mary	Philip Mountbatten	Windsor
	Elizabeth II (1926–2022)	Governors-general: John Montague Stow, Arleigh Winston Scott, Deighton Lisle Ward, Hugh Springer, Nita Barrow, Clifford Husbands, Elliott Belgrave, Sandra Mason				
	Elizabeth II (1926–2022)	Prime ministers: Errol Barrow, Tom Adams, Harold Bernard St. John, Lloyd Erskine Sandiford, Owen Arthur, David Thompson, Freundel Stuart, Mia Mottley				

== See also ==
- List of Commonwealth visits made by Queen Elizabeth II
- Monarchies in the Americas
- List of monarchies
- List of heads of state of Barbados
