= Constitution (Amendment) (No. 2) Act, 2021 =

Barbados constitutional amendment of 2021

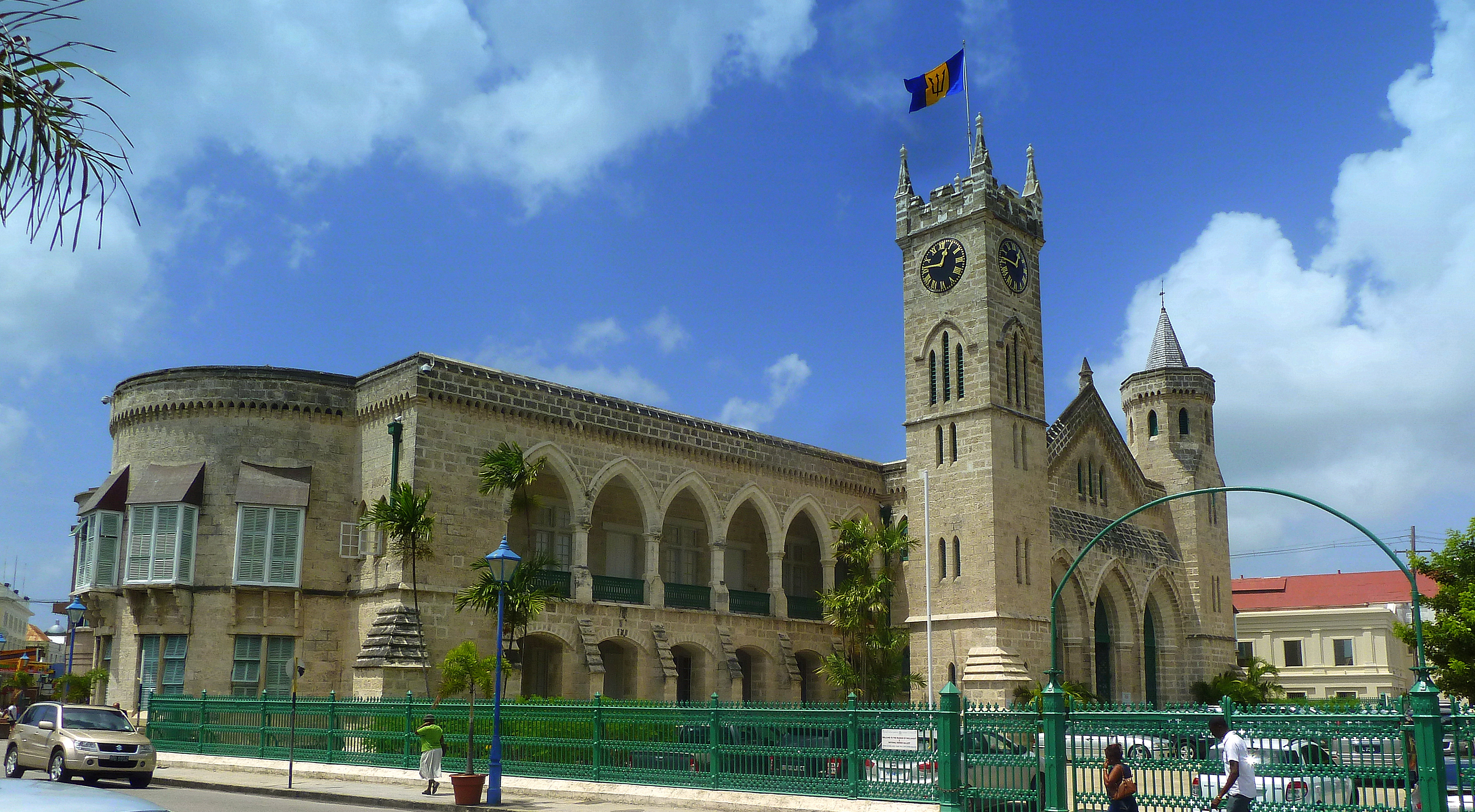

Parliament of Barbados
- Long title: An Act to alter the Constitution in order to provide for Barbados to become a republic with a President who shall be Head of State of Barbados; and to provide for related matters.
- Citation: Act 2021–22
- Territorial extent: Barbados
- Passed by: House of Assembly of Barbados
- Passed: 28 September 2021
- Passed by: Senate of Barbados
- Passed: 6 October 2021
- Royal assent: 7 October 2021
- Signed by: Sandra Mason (Governor-General of Barbados)
- Commenced: 11 October 2021 (section 7); 30 November 2021 (other sections)

Legislative history

Initiating chamber: House of Assembly of Barbados
- Bill citation: Constitution (Amendment) (No. 2) Bill, 2021
- Introduced by: Mia Mottley (Prime Minister of Barbados)
- Introduced: 20 September 2021
- First reading: 28 September 2021
- Second reading: 28 September 2021

Revising chamber: Senate of Barbados
- First reading: 29 September 2021
- Second reading: 6 October 2021

Related legislation
- Barbados Independence Act 1966

Keywords
- Republicanism, Head of state, Diplomatic credentials, Commonwealth membership criteria
- Status: Current legislation

The Constitution (Amendment) (No. 2) Act, 2021 is an act that amended the Constitution of Barbados to replace the Monarchy of Barbados as the country's Head of State with the office of the President of Barbados thereby transitioning its form of governance from a monarchy to a republic. Under the Act all of the functions previously performed by the Monarch and their Governor-General were transferred to the president. The amendment was passed on the 6 October 2021 with its commencement via proclamation being 11 October 2021 (section 7) and 30 November 2021 (other sections).

Its long title was:

An Act to alter the Constitution in order

(a) to provide for Barbados to become a republic with a President who shall be Head of State of Barbados; and

(b) to provide for related matters.

== Background ==
Barbados became an independent nation state on 30 November 1966, having previously been a British colony. Like many other former colonies, Barbados became a Commonwealth realm, with Elizabeth II as Queen of Barbados.

In September 2020, the Barbados Labour Party government of Prime Minister Mia Mottley announced in its Throne Speech that Barbados would become a republic by November 2021. The Barbados Labour Party held a two-thirds majority in both houses of the Barbadian Parliament (including all but one lower house seat), enough to approve a constitutional amendment. If the plan was successful, it meant that Barbados would cease to be a Commonwealth realm, but would maintain membership in the Commonwealth of Nations.

== Legislative history ==
The Bill was introduced to the House of Assembly of Barbados on 20 September 2021 and had its first and second reading on the 28 September 2021. The Bill was then passed that same day and sent to the Senate the following day on the 29th where it had its first reading that day and its second reading on 6 October 2021. It was then signed into law on the 7 October 2021 by Governor-General Sandra Mason.

== Amendments ==
- All references in the law of Barbados to Her Majesty the Queen, the Crown, and the Sovereign shall be read and construed as referring to the State;
- All references to "Her Majesty's dominions" shall be read and construed as a reference to the Commonwealth of Nations.
- All references to the Governor-General shall be read and construed as referring to the President of Barbados;
- All the powers of the Governor-General transferred to the President;
- Amending the official oaths of Barbados to remove references to the Queen;
- Electing the first President in a joint sitting of the Parliament of Barbados by 15 October 2021 by the joint nomination of the prime minister of Barbados and leader of the opposition with the person elected to take office on 30 November 2021;
- Following the end of the first president's term, future presidents will be elected by either a joint nomination of the prime minister and leader of the opposition or if there is no joint nomination, a vote of both houses of the Parliament of Barbados where a two-thirds majority is required;
- The President is to serve a term of four years and can be reelected only once;
- The President is immune from prosecution for the duration of their time in office;
- The Office of the president is considered vacant if they die in office, resigns the office by instrument in writing addressed to the House of Assembly and delivered to the Speaker; or is removed from office.
- The President may be removed from office if he wilfully violates any provision of the Constitution; if he behaves in a way that endangers the security of the State; for inability to discharge the functions of his office (whether arising from inability of body or mind or any other cause); or for misbehaviour.
- Vesting all property held by the Crown in the State;
- Vesting all the rights and privileges of the Governor-General in the President;
- Vesting the prerogatives or privileges of the Crown or Sovereign in the State, subject to the Constitution.
- Persons who immediately before the appointed day holds the office of Prime Minister, the office of Speaker, office of President of the Senate the office of Leader of the Opposition or Judges of the Supreme Court, shall as from that day continue to hold that respective office as if they had been appointed to that office in accordance with the provisions of the Constitution;
- Any power of a Commission established by the Constitution before the appointed day, which immediately before that day, was validly delegated to any person or authority shall, to the extent that that power could be delegated under the Constitution to such person or authority, be deemed as from the appointed day, to have been delegated to that person or authority in accordance with the provisions of the Constitution;
- The Royal Barbados Police Force was renamed the Barbados Police Service.

== Criticism ==
Then Opposition senator Caswell Franklyn, while supportive of the transition to a republic, criticized the bill stating that a new constitution "should be drawn up" to facilitate the transition instead of an amendment to the Barbados Independence Act 1966, further adding that the process was "rushed".

== See also ==
- Barbados Police Service
- List of heads of state of Barbados
- Republicanism in Barbados
