= Queen's Personal Barbadian Flag =

Personal flag used by Elizabeth II, Queen of Barbados

Queen's Personal Flag for Barbados
- Use: Small vexillological symbol or pictogram in black and white showing the different uses of the flag Reverse side is congruent with obverse side
- Proportion: 1:2
- Adopted: 1975
- Relinquished: 30 November 2021

The Queen's Personal Flag for Barbados was the personal standard of Elizabeth II, in her role as Queen of Barbados for use while in Barbados. It was first used when the Queen visited Barbados in 1975. The Queen's representative, the governor-general of Barbados, had their own standard. The flags of both the Queen and the governor-general were retired when Barbados ceased to be a Commonwealth realm; becoming a republic on 30 November 2021.

== Description ==
The escutcheon of the coat of arms of Barbados serves as basis for the flag.

The Queen's Personal Flag for Barbados consisted of a yellow field with a bearded fig tree, a long-established symbol of the island of Barbados, and the national flower, the Caesalpinia pulcherrima (also referred to as the Pride of Barbados) flowers in each of the upper corners. A blue disc of the letter "E" crowned surrounded by a garland of gold roses is displayed prominently on the flag within the centre of the tree. The disc is taken from the Queen's Personal Flag.

== History ==
The Queen's Personal Barbadian Flag was first used in 1975 when she visited Barbados. On her visit, she knighted the cricketer Garfield Sobers at Kensington Oval in Bridgetown. She visited again two years later whilst she was on her Silver Jubilee tour. In 2021, following Barbados's announcing that it was to become a republic, a flag lowering ceremony was held in the presence of Charles, then Prince of Wales and the Governor-General of Barbados, Dame Sandra Mason. Due to the Queen not being present, to symbolise the ending of the Barbadian monarchy, the Royal Standard of the United Kingdom was lowered in place of the Queen's Personal Barbadian Flag.

== See also ==
- Flags of Elizabeth II
- National symbols of Barbados
- List of Barbadian flags
