= Coat of arms of Barbados =

National coat of arms

Versions

- Armiger: Barbados
- Adopted: 1966
- Crest: A dexter Cubit Arm of a Barbadian erect proper the hand grasping two Sugar Canes in saltire proper.
- Torse: Or and Gules
- Shield: Or a bearded Fig Tree eradicated in chief two Red Pride of Barbados Flowers proper.
- Supporters: On the sinister (left) side a Dolphinfish and on the dexter (right) side a Pelican proper.
- Compartment: A scroll with the National Motto
- Motto: Pride and Industry
- Earlier version

The coat of arms of Barbados was adopted on 14 February 1966, by a royal warrant of Queen Elizabeth II. The coat of arms of Barbados was presented by the Queen to the then President of the Senate of Barbados, Sir Grey Massiah. Like other former British possessions in the Caribbean, the coat of arms has a helmet with a national symbol on top, and a shield beneath that is supported by two animals.

The arms were designed by Neville Connell, for many years curator of the Barbados Museum, with artistic assistance by Hilda Ince.

The coat of arms were unaffected by the 2021 governmental transition from a monarchy to republic.

== Official description ==
Barbadian law puts for the blazon of the coat of arms as follows:

Arms: Or a bearded Fig Tree eradicated in chief two Red Pride of Barbados Flowers proper.

Crest: On a Wreath Or and Gules A dexter Cubit Arm of a Barbadian erect proper the hand grasping two Sugar Canes in saltire proper.

Supporters: On the sinister (left) side a Dolphinfish and on the dexter (right) side a Pelican proper.

Motto: “ Pride and Industry. ”

== See also ==
- Flag of Barbados
- National symbols of Barbados
- Queen's Personal Barbadian Flag

== Notes ==
- CHAPTER 300A NATIONAL EMBLEMS AND NATIONAL ANTHEM OF BARBADOS (REGULATION)
