= 2021 Barbadian presidential election =

First Barbadian presidential election

- 20 October 2021

51 members of the Parliament of Barbados (30 MPs and 21 Senators) 20 House and 14 Senate votes needed to win
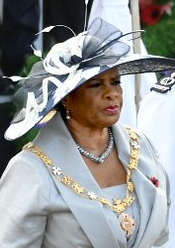
| Nominee | Sandra Mason |
| Party | Independent |
| Electoral vote | 18 (Senate); 27 (House) |
| Percentage | 100.00% (Senate); 100.00% (House) |
President before election
Office established
Elizabeth II as Queen of Barbados
Elected President
Sandra Mason
Independent

The 2021 Barbadian presidential election was held on 20 October 2021 to choose the first president of Barbados, an office established as part of Barbados becoming a republic. Sandra Mason, the incumbent governor-general of Barbados, was elected president, and she replaced Queen Elizabeth II as head of state of Barbados when she was sworn in on 30 November 2021.

== Electoral system ==
The president is elected indirectly by the Parliament of Barbados.

The prime minister and the leader of the opposition jointly nominate a consensus candidate 90 days before the incumbent's term is due to expire, who is then elected in a walkover without a vote unless any MP lodges their objection. If an objection is lodged, the joint sitting is suspended and the two Houses of Parliament, the Senate and the House of Assembly, meet separately and each vote on accepting or rejecting the nominee. A two-thirds majority of valid votes in each house separately is then required to elect a candidate on all rounds of balloting.

If no consensus candidate is nominated by the 60th day before the end of the incumbent's term, the election is opened to other candidates. To gain ballot access in such an open election, a candidate must be nominated either by the prime minister, the leader of the Opposition, or at least ten members of the House of Assembly. The requirement for a two-thirds majority of valid votes in each house separately also applies in an open election; this means that if only one candidate has been nominated, the voting system is the same as when a consensus candidate has been objected to.

== Candidate ==
Sandra Mason, the incumbent governor-general of Barbados, was the only candidate for the office; she was nominated jointly by the prime minister, Mia Mottley, and the leader of the opposition, Bishop Joseph Atherley. Mason would have been deemed elected without a vote if there had been no objections to her candidacy. However, Senator Caswell Franklyn formally objected, saying that the electors had not been notified of the election rules in advance, and claiming that the rules were made up without constitutional basis and that the ballot didn't allow a place to vote 'no'. Due to this objection, the joint sitting was suspended and each chamber of parliament proceeded to hold a separate vote on Mason's nomination.

The House of Assembly's session was attended by 28 out of 30 members with William Duguid and George Payne being absent, while the Senate's session was attended by 20 out of 21 members with Lucille Moe being absent. In both Assembly and Senate, the respective presidents – Arthur Holder and Reginald Farley – abstained from voting. Prime Minister Mottley said that the new president would promote "unity of purpose" for Barbados.

Mason was sworn in on 30 November, which was the 55th anniversary of Barbadian independence.

| Candidate | Senate | | House of Assembly | |
| Candidate | Votes | % | Votes | % |
|---|---|---|---|---|
| Sandra Mason | 18 | 100.00 | 27 | 100.00 |
| Total | 18 | 100.00 | 27 | 100.00 |
| Valid votes | 18 | 94.74 | 27 | 100.00 |
| Invalid/blank votes | 1 | 5.26 | 0 | 0.00 |
| Total votes | 19 | 100.00 | 27 | 100.00 |
| Registered voters/turnout | 21 | 90.48 | 30 | 90.00 |
Source: ,
