= National symbols of Barbados =

National emblems of Barbados are the symbols that are used in Barbados to represent the independent nation. The emblems reflect different aspects of its cultural life and history.

== List of symbols ==
Symbol	Image	Started on
National flag		30 November 1966; 59 years ago
Coat of arms of Barbados		14 February 1966; 60 years ago
Motto	Pride and Industry	14 February 1966; 60 years ago
National anthem	In Plenty and In Time of Need	30 November 1966; 59 years ago
National Pledge	The National Pledge	2 April 1973; 53 years ago
President's Standard		30 November 2021; 4 years ago
Prime Minister's Standard		
National colours	ultramarine #120A8F gold #D4A017 black #000000	
National dish	Cou-Cou and Flying Fish	
Floral emblem	Caesalpinia pulcherrima	
National Animal	Mahi-Mahi	
National bird	Pelecanus occidentalis	
National Dress for men	Proposed	
National Dress for women	Proposed	

== Former List of symbols ==
Symbol	image	Started-Ended
Colonial Municipal seal(s)
Bridgetown City Corporation		1942
Colonial flag(s)
Union Flag		1632–1801
Union Flag		1801–1871
Barbados & Windward Is.		1871–1885
Crown colony		1885–1958
Province of Barbados (West Indies Federation)		1958–1966
Vice-Royal insignia	Governor's Flag	1870–1966
Queen Elizabeth II Royal Cypher		1953–2021
Post-Colonial flag(s)
Queen Elizabeth II Royal Standard		1966–2021
Viceroy insignia	Governor-General	1966–2021

== Flag ==
The trident centred within the flag is a representation of the mythological Neptune, god of the sea. The trident in its original unbroken form was taken from the former colonial seal, which itself was replaced by the current coat of arms. Used within the national flag, the left and right shafts of the trident were then designed as 'broken' representing the nation of Barbados breaking away from its historical and constitutional ties as a former colony.

The three points of the trident represent in Barbados the three principles of democracy—"government of, for and by the people." The broken trident is set in a centred vertical band of gold representing the sands of Barbados' beaches. The gold band itself is surrounded on both sides by vertical bands of ultramarine (blue) representing the sea and sky of Barbados.

The design for the flag was created by Grantley W. Prescod and was chosen from an open competition arranged by the Barbados government. Over a thousand entries were received.

== Heraldry ==
The coat of arms depicts two animals which are supporting the shield. On the left is a "dolphin" which is symbolic of the fishing industry. On the right is a pelican which is symbolic of a small island named Pelican Island that once existed off the coast of Bridgetown. Above the shield is the helmet of Barbados with an extended arm clutching two sugar-cane stalks. The "cross" formation made by the cane stalks represents the saltire cross upon which Saint Andrew was crucified. On the base of the coat of arms reads "Pride and Industry".

=== Golden Shield ===
The Golden Shield in the coat of arms carries two "Pride of Barbados" flowers (Caesalpinia pulcherrima) and the "bearded" fig tree, which was common on the island at the time of its settlement by the British and may have contributed to Barbados being so named. Too, we can see a black arm with an tool for plantations (symbol of the slaves of the colonisation past) get out of a helmet. There is the typical bird on the right and the typical fish on the left.

== Flower ==
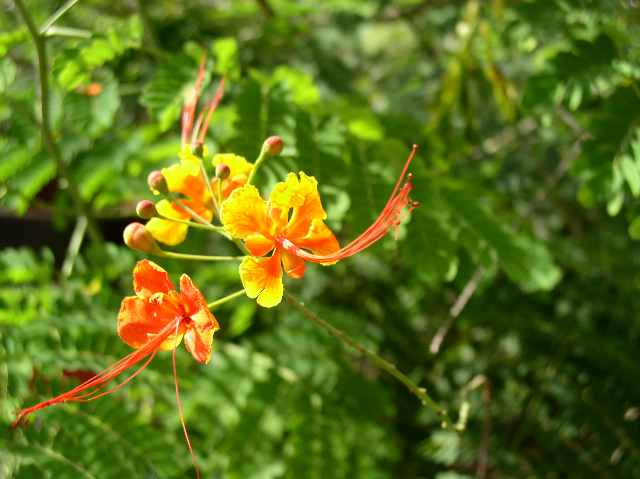
A yellow and red Pride of Barbados.

The national flower is the Pride of Barbados or Caesalpinia pulcherrima (L.) Sw., which grows across the island.

== National heroes ==
In April 1998, the Order of National Heroes Act was passed by the Parliament of Barbados. According to the government, the act established that 28 April (the centenary of the birth of Sir Grantley Adams) would be celebrated as National Heroes' Day. The act also declared that there are ten national heroes of Barbados, all of whom would be elevated to the title of "The Right Excellent". On the first day of Barbados as a parliamentary presidential republic, the government conferred the title of National Hero to singer Rihanna in 2021, raising the number to eleven National Heroes.

The eleven official National Heroes of Barbados are:

- Bussa (−1816)
- Sarah Ann Gill (1795–1866)
- Samuel Jackman Prescod (1806–1871)
- Dr. Charles Duncan O’Neal (1879–1936)
- Clement Osbourne Payne (1904–1941)
- Sir Grantley Herbert Adams (1898–1971)
- Rt. Hon. Errol Walton Barrow (1920–1987)
- Sir Hugh Worrell Springer (1913–1994)
- Sir Garfield St. Aubyn Sobers (born 1936)
- Sir Frank Walcott (1916–1999)
- Rihanna (born 1988)

== National Pledge ==
The National Pledge of Barbados is as follows

I pledge allegiance to my country Barbados and to my flag,
To uphold and defend their honour,
And by my living to do credit
To my nation wherever I go.

The Pledge was created by Lester Vaughan, born in 1910. Vaughan died on 16 September 2003, at the age of 92.
