= National Anthem of Barbados =

- National anthem of Barbados
- Also known as: In Plenty and in Time of Need
- Lyrics: Irving Burgie
- Music: C. Van Roland Edwards
- Adopted: 30 November 1966

Audio sample
- file; help

The "National Anthem of Barbados", also known by its incipit "In Plenty and in Time of Need", is the national anthem of the country of Barbados. It was written by Irving Burgie and was composed by C. Van Roland Edwards. As one part of the West Indies Federation from 1958 to 1962, Barbados' anthem was supposed to be "Forged from the Love of Liberty" (which is currently the national anthem of Trinidad and Tobago), however the current anthem was created with Barbados's moves toward full independence. The song was then adopted by Barbados when it became independent in 1966.

== History ==
The anthem was composed by C. Van Roland Edwards (1912–1985). Edwards, a composer who was partially blind, was assisted by his daughters Nannette and Eullia in his composition of "In Plenty and in Time of Need". The lyrics were written by Irving Burgie (1924–2019), a musician from Brooklyn, New York City, born to a Barbadian mother and an American father. A committee made up of Bruce St. John, Frank Collymore, Enid Lynch, George Lamming, Gerald Hudson and John Fletcher selected Edwards's composition as the national anthem, and Edwards was awarded BDS$500.

The anthem was first performed on Independence Day, on 30 November 1966. In 1967, the anthem's music was rearranged by Inspector Prince Cave of the Barbados Police Service, giving it a more sustained harmony while retaining the original tune.

== Lyrics ==
I
In plenty and in time of need
When this fair land was young
Our brave forefathers sowed the seed
From which our pride is sprung
A pride that makes no wanton boast
Of what it has withstood
That binds our hearts from coast to coast
The pride of nationhood

Chorus:
We loyal sons and daughters all
Do hereby make it known
These fields and hills beyond recall
Are now our very own
We write our names on history's page
With expectations great
Strict guardians of our heritage
Firm craftsmen of our fate

II
The Lord has been the people's guide
For past three hundred years.
With Him still on the people's side
We have no doubts or fears.
Upward and onward we shall go,
Inspired, exulting, free,
And greater will our nation grow
In strength and unity.

Chorus

== Rules regarding anthem ==
The Government of Barbados outlines the following rules for the National Anthem:

=== Conduct during play ===
1. Whenever the National Anthem is played all civilians present should stand at attention, men with bared heads. Persons in uniform should act in accordance with instructions.

=== Anthem application ===
2. Normally one verse only and the chorus will be played. Where a shortened version of the National Anthem is played, it shall consist of the first twelve bars of the verse and the last four bars of the chorus.

The National Anthem shall be played:

- (a) for the purposes of a salute on ceremonial or official occasions, on the arrival and departure of:
  - (i) the President of Barbados.
  - (ii) a foreign Sovereign, Head of State or member of a reigning foreign imperial or Royal Family,
  - (iii) Governors-General of Independent Commonwealth countries.
  - (iv) Governors of the Associated States, and
  - (v) Governors, High Commissioners of Officers administering the Government of a dependent territory within the Commonwealth
- (b) at the beginning of all public performances in a cinema house.

3. The National Anthem may be played

- (a) at the completion of any public function, or
- (b) when toasts are proposed at official functions.

=== Rules in usage ===
4. The National Anthem should not be parodied in verse or in song neither should it be played in any tempo other than that officially recognized (eighty-eight crotchets to the minute). Particularly, the tune should not be used as a dance number or for the purposes of advertisement.

5. When more than one anthem is played the Barbados anthem should be played last.

== See also ==
- National symbols of Barbados
