= Republicanism in Barbados =

Barbados's transition to a republic

On 30 November 2021, Barbados transitioned from a parliamentary constitutional monarchy under the hereditary monarch of Barbados (Queen Elizabeth II) to a parliamentary republic with a ceremonial indirectly elected president as head of state. The prime minister remained head of government while the last governor-general, Dame Sandra Mason, was elected as the country's first president on 20 October 2021, and took office on 30 November 2021.

== History ==
Barbados became an independent nation state on 30 November 1966, having previously been a British colony. Like many other former colonies, Barbados became a Commonwealth realm, with the British sovereign, Elizabeth II, also serving simultaneously, under Barbadian law, as Queen of Barbados.

=== 1979 commission ===
In 1979, a commission of inquiry known as the Cox Commission on the Constitution was charged with studying the feasibility of introducing a republican system. The Cox Commission came to the conclusion that Barbadians preferred to maintain the constitutional monarchy. The proposal to move to a republican form of government was therefore not pursued.

=== 1996 commission ===
The 1994 manifesto of the Barbados Labour Party dealt with the republic issue, proposing a referendum. In line with this promise, on 29 October 1996 a Constitution Review Commission, chaired by Henry de Boulay Forde, was appointed to review the Constitution of Barbados.

The commission elected Oliver Jackman, a former diplomat and a judge of the Inter-American Court of Human Rights, as its vice-chairman.

The commission was mandated to:

1. determine the necessity for retaining the monarchical system of government and make recommendations in respect of the executive form of government most suited to protect parliamentary democracy, the fundamental rights and freedoms of the citizens of Barbados and to achieve effective and efficient government so as to position Barbados to meet the challenges of the 21st century and beyond.

2. To advise and make a recommendation concerning the appropriateness or otherwise of maintaining Barbados' link with the Crown.

3. To advise and make a recommendation concerning a structure for the executive authority of Barbados that is best suited to protect the independence and authority of Parliament and the fundamental rights and freedoms of its citizens.

The commission held public hearings in Barbados and overseas. The commission reported back on 15 December 1998, and submitted its report to the then Governor-General, Sir Clifford Husbands. The commission recommended that Barbados adopt further checks and balances along with a parliamentary republic system. In 1999 the Barbados Labour Party's manifesto proposed that the findings of the commission and its recommendation that Barbados become a republic receive the early attention of the Government.

A Referendum Bill was introduced in Parliament and had its first reading on 10 October 2000. With the dissolution of Parliament just prior to the elections in 2003, the Referendum Bill was not carried over into the new Parliament.

=== 2008 proposed referendum ===
In February 2005 the Government of Barbados announced its intention to hold a referendum on the republic issue. It introduced a Referendum Bill that month. The Bill was passed into law as the Referendum Act in October 2005. The Act did not set a date for the referendum but instead specified that the "Referendum Day" could be proclaimed by the governor-general, being no more than 90 days and no less than 60 days from the date of proclamation. The Act itself did not and could not amend Barbados's constitution: under section 49.1 of the constitution a majority of two-thirds of Parliament is required to make any amendments.

According to the Referendum Act 2005, the question to be asked was:

Do you agree with the recommendation of the Constitution Review Commission that Barbados should become a parliamentary republic with the head of state of Barbados being a president who is a citizen of Barbados?

Owen Arthur, as prime minister, stated publicly: "Heaven forbid, but if Her Majesty Queen Elizabeth were to die, if Prince Charles and Prince William were to die, I would have a fundamental difficulty swearing allegiance to King Harry." The comment came shortly after Prince Harry had attended a public function in fancy dress wearing a Nazi armband in January 2005.

Mia Mottley, who was Deputy Prime Minister of Barbados, said: "We feel that it is the right thing to do to have a Barbadian head of state. We accept that there was a concern that the Government alone should not make that decision in this day and age and we are therefore committed to expressing our views to the public and having them pass judgment on it."

The referendum on Barbados becoming a republic was planned to be held by August 2008, near to the time of the parliamentary elections. However, it was reported on 2 December 2007 that the vote was to be deferred to a later date.

=== 2015 proposal ===
On 22 March 2015, Prime Minister Freundel Stuart announced that Barbados would move towards a republican form of government "in the very near future". Stuart told a meeting of his Democratic Labour Party:

"We cannot pat ourselves on the shoulder at having gone into independence; having de-colonised our politics; we cannot pat ourselves on the shoulders at having decolonized our jurisprudence by delinking from the Judicial Committee of the Privy Council and explain to anybody why we continue to have a monarchical system. Therefore, the Right Excellent Errol Barrow decolonised the politics; Owen Arthur decolonised the jurisprudence and Freundel Stuart is going to complete the process."

The general secretary of the Democratic Labour Party, George Pilgrim, confirmed the move and said that it was expected to coincide with the 50th anniversary of Barbadian independence in 2016. According to Pilgrim, the change would be implemented through a bill that would be presented to the Parliament of Barbados.

According to the country's Constitution, a two-thirds majority in Parliament was needed to authorise such a change. The Democratic Labour Party had a two-thirds majority in the Senate of Barbados but not in the House of Assembly where it would need the support of the opposition Barbados Labour Party to approve the transition.

=== 2020 events and stages to final proposal ===
A former High Commissioner of Barbados to the United Kingdom, Guy Hewitt, described "changed perceptions" of the monarchy in Barbados following the Windrush scandal, and other controversies surrounding race, democracy and colonialism in the UK, as having contributed to Barbados becoming a republic.

=== September 2020 announcement ===
In September 2020, the Barbados Labour Party government of Prime Minister Mia Mottley announced in its Throne Speech that Barbados would become a republic by November 2021. The Barbados Labour Party held a two-thirds majority in both houses of the Barbadian Parliament (including all but one lower house seat), enough to approve a constitutional amendment. If the plan was successful, it meant that Barbados would cease to be a Commonwealth realm, but would maintain membership in the Commonwealth of Nations.

In the 2020 Throne Speech, the Governor-General of Barbados, Dame Sandra Mason, stated, "[t]he time has come to fully leave our colonial past behind. Barbadians want a Barbadian head of state." Former prime minister Freundel Stuart was also a supporter of Barbados becoming a republic, as was Hewitt, who stated in an interview that many Barbadians believe that the country was due for "a native-born citizen as head of state." On 3 June 2021, it was reported in Barbadian media outlets that the general public could email to submit suggestions regarding the republic issue.

On 27 July 2021, the Day of National Significance in Barbados, Mottley announced that Barbados' Cabinet had decided that Barbados would become a parliamentary republic by 30 November and accepted the recommendations of the Forde Commission. Under the proposal, the president would be elected by both houses of parliament for a four-year term and be eligible for a second term. The president would have mostly ceremonial powers; real power would continue to be de facto vested in the prime minister and Cabinet. The amendments to the Constitution of Barbados were to be made before 30 November to facilitate the swearing-in of a new president on that day. The decision to become a republic without holding a referendum on the issue was criticized.

=== 2021 Constitutional amendment ===
On 20 September 2021, the Constitution (Amendment) (No. 2) Bill, 2021 was introduced to the Parliament of Barbados. It proposed the following amendments to the Constitution of Barbados:

- All references in the law of Barbados to Her Majesty the Queen, the Crown, and the Sovereign shall be read and construed as referring to the State;
- All references to "Her Majesty's dominions" shall be read and construed as a reference to the Commonwealth of Nations.
- All references to the Governor-General shall be read and construed as referring to the President of Barbados;
- All the powers of the Governor-General transferred to the President;
- Amending the official oaths of Barbados to remove references to the Queen;
- Electing the first President in a joint sitting of the Parliament of Barbados by 15 October 2021 by the joint nomination of the prime minister of Barbados and leader of the opposition with the person elected to take office on 30 November 2021;
- Following the end of the first president's term, future presidents will be elected by either a joint nomination of the prime minister and leader of the opposition or if there is no joint nomination, a vote of both houses of the Parliament of Barbados where a two-thirds majority is required;
- President to serve a term of four years;
- Vesting all property held by the Crown in the State;
- Vesting all the rights and privileges of the Governor-General in the President;
- Vesting the prerogatives or privileges of the Crown or Sovereign in the State, subject to the Constitution.

On 28 September 2021, the House of Assembly of Barbados passed the bill (25–0). On 6 October 2021, the Senate of Barbados passed the bill. It received royal assent on the following day.

On 12 October 2021, the incumbent governor-general of Barbados Dame Sandra Mason was jointly nominated by the prime minister and leader of the opposition as candidate for the first president of Barbados, and was subsequently elected on 20 October. Mason took office on 30 November 2021 in a ceremony also attended by Charles, Prince of Wales. Queen Elizabeth II sent a message of congratulations to President Mason, saying "As you celebrate this momentous day, I send you and all Barbadians my warmest good wishes for your happiness, peace and prosperity in the future."

== Public opinion and reactions ==
In the 1990s, several judicial rulings by the judges of the Judicial Committee of the British Privy Council seeking to curtail the practice of death penalty in the Caribbean despite substantial support for it led to calls by some indicating that if breaking ties with the United Kingdom was needed to carry out capital punishment as a form of justice for the country (or region) needed to take. Subsequent meetings were held at the Caribbean Community (CARICOM) Heads of Government level calling for the need to replace the Judicial Committee of the British Privy Council and widened debate on other aspects of ties leading calls of a Caribbean Court of Justice in the region.

In 2020, a source from the Barbadian foreign ministry said, "We love the Queen and the royal family and have no qualms with them. But we must learn to govern ourselves. Quite a few of the royal family have been to Barbados and will always be welcome. Our quest to become a republic is borne out of the fact that we need to get in line with the 21st century".

Sir Garfield Sobers, Barbadian national hero and former cricketer, criticised the government's decision to become a republic, and said, "The Queen was very highly appreciated here. It will be very sad for a lot of us. It was a bit of a shock". Other citizens questioned the need for change.

Leader of the opposition, Joseph Atherley, criticised the timing of the transition, while Grenville Phillips II, the leader of Solutions Barbados, opposed the move as it was without the express consent of the people of Barbados and promised a referendum if they gained power. British television personality Jeremy Clarkson opined that the change marked a shift of influence in Barbadian affairs from the United Kingdom to China.

In Canada, a constitutional monarchy and Commonwealth realm, Members of Parliament belonging to the Conservative Party sang Canada's royal anthem, "God Save the Queen", in parliament on 1 December 2021, while rejecting a Bloc Québécois motion to congratulate Barbados on "renouncing the British monarchy".

A 2021 survey taken by the University of the West Indies between 23 October and 10 November asked a sample of 500 Barbadians from various backgrounds their opinions following the transition and reported some measure of support, albeit with only 34% showing outright support and 35% indifferent/did not care. When asked specifically on how they feel about having their own president or head of state, 51% responded they wanted an elected or selected head or president in the country while 12% responded with wanting to retain the Queen. There was overall a neutral feeling towards how the transition will impact Barbados with 66% responding neutrally and 21% responding that it will have a positive impact. Across the age groups, support for a republic was strongest in those over age 55.

== Aftermath ==
=== 2022 Commission ===
On June 20, 2022, a Constitutional Review Commission was formed and sworn in by Acting President Jeffrey Gibson (as President Mason was on a foreign trip), to begin the process of drafting a new constitution for the republican era of Barbados.

The 10 members of this commission included:

- Christopher Blackman, a retired Court of Appeal Judge
- Adriel Brathwaite, a former Attorney-General
- Kerryann Ifill, a former president of the Senate
- Gregory Nicholls, an Attorney-at-law
- Sade Jemmott, an Attorney-at-law
- Christopher De Caires, a businessman
- John Rogers, Anglican theologian
- Sulieman Bulbulia, a Muslim activist
- Khaleel Kothdiwala, youth activist
- Mary-Ann Redman, president of the Barbados Secondary Teachers Union

On 30 September 2024, the Constitutional Review Commission submitted its report to President Mason in a small ceremony after 27 months of deliberations. Christopher Blackman, one of the 10 members said: "The draft Bill, which accompanies the report, expands the provisions of the current Constitution by more than 50 per cent, with a notable aspect being the greatly expanded Chapter on Fundamental Rights and Freedoms. This has led to the recommendation for the establishment of a Human Rights Commission for Barbados. While the Commission has recommended the maintenance of the status quo in respect of matters such as the first-past-the-post outcome at elections and elections being called at the discretion of the Prime Minister, other proposals, limiting the powers of the Prime Minister on appointments and the like, have been proposed,”. The report was also submitted to the Prime Minister's Office.

The report and the draft bill was released on 21 November 2024 to the public on the Constitution Reform Commission Website for the public's review with a final decision on the report due January 2025.

== See also ==
- Republics in the Commonwealth of Nations
- Commonwealth of Nations
- Scottish republicanism
- Welsh republicanism
- Republicanism
