= Barbados Independence Act 1966 =

Act of the Parliament of the United Kingdom

Barbados Independence Act 1966 (Note: Section 6(1).)
- Act of Parliament
- Parliament of the United Kingdom
- Long title: An Act to make provision for, and in connection with, the attainment by Barbados of fully responsible status within the Commonwealth.
- Citation: 1966 c. 37
- Territorial extent: United Kingdom

Dates
- Royal assent: 17 November 1966
- Commencement: 30 November 1966 (Note: Section 1(1).)
Other legislation
Amended by	Finance Act 1969; Civil Aviation Act 1971; Statute Law (Repeals) Act 1977; Interpretation Act 1978; International Organisations Act 1981; British Nationality Act 1981; Copyright, Designs and Patents Act 1988; Merchant Shipping Act 1995; Commonwealth Act 2002; Armed Forces Act 2006

Status: Amended

Text of statute as originally enacted

Text of the Barbados Independence Act 1966 as in force today (including any amendments) within the United Kingdom, from legislation.gov.uk.

The Barbados Independence Act 1966 (c. 37) is an act of the Parliament of the United Kingdom that granted independence to Barbados with effect from 30 November 1966. The act also provided for the granting of a new constitution to take effect upon independence, which was done by the Barbados Independence Order 1966.

As a result of the act, Barbados became the fourth English-speaking country in the West Indies to achieve full independence from the United Kingdom, after Jamaica, Trinidad & Tobago, and Guyana. At independence, Barbados became a member of the Commonwealth of Nations as a Commonwealth realm; prior to this, Barbados had been a fully self-governing British colony from 1961.

== Background to enactment ==
The bill was first presented in the House of Commons of the United Kingdom as the Barbados Independence Bill on 28 October 1966, by Secretary of State for the Colonies, Frederick Lee. It was passed in the House of Commons after a third reading and committee on 2 November 1966, without amendments. It entered the House of Lords on 3 November 1966 and was read by Malcolm Shepherd, 2nd Baron Shepherd on 10 November 1966. It was passed in the House of Lords on 15 November 1966 without any amendments.

The bill received Royal assent on 17 November 1966, from Queen Elizabeth II. before taking effect on 30 November that year.

== Republic status referendum ==
Barbados then remained a constitutional monarchy under the Barbadian monarch until announcing a conscientious republic status following an electoral college style referendum on 30 November 2021.

== See also ==
- Barbados nationality law
- Saint Andrew's Day
- U.S. Monroe Doctrine
