= Constitution of Barbados =

Supreme law of Barbados

The Constitution of Barbados

Overview
- Jurisdiction: Barbados
- Ratified: 22 November 1966
- Date effective: 30 November 1966
- System: Parliamentary monarchy (before 2021); Parliamentary republic

Government structure
- Branches: Executive; Legislative; Judicial
- Head of state: President, elected by Parliament
- Chambers: House of Assembly; Senate
- Executive: Prime minister–led cabinet responsible to the House of Assembly
- Judiciary: See Judiciary of Barbados
- Last amended: 2021

The Constitution of Barbados is the supreme law under which Barbados is governed. The Constitution provides a legal establishment of the Government of Barbados, as well as legal rights and responsibilities of the public and various other government officers. The Constitution which came into force in 1966 was amended in 1974, 1980, 1981, 1985, 1989, 1990, 1992, 1995, 2000, 2002, 2003, 2005, 2007, 2009, 2010, 2018, 2019, 2020 and 2021. The 1966 document succeeds several other documents concerning administration of Barbados. One of them, the Barbados Charter, is discussed in the present Constitution's Preamble. Prior statutes were created for the administration of Barbados as a colony. As a former English and later British colony, the Constitution is similar to those of other former Commonwealth realms, yet distinctly different in the spirit of the Statute of Westminster.

== History ==
=== Early history ===
In 1625 the English landed at Barbados and carved the term 'For King James of E. and this island' on a tree, then some personal items were left behind, and the ship's crew returned to England to notify The Crown and to seek initial settlers. In 1627 the initial settlers landed at Barbados and formed a colony based entirely on common law. As the population of Barbados grew a General Assembly was created and began to draft laws. After conflict in England erupted during the English Civil War, and large numbers of English settlers moved to Barbados, the General Assembly began the practice of creating a distinctly Barbados-based administration based upon the plantocracy class.

=== Recent history ===
As a constituent province of the West Indies Federation, Barbados became independent of the United Kingdom on 30 November 1966 under the Barbados Independence Act 1966. Elizabeth II issued an Order in Council, the Barbados Independence Order 1966, which formally enacted the present constitution. On 30 November 2021, Sandra Mason became the first President of Barbados, replacing Queen Elizabeth as head of state, with Barbados transitioning to a republic after an amendment was passed in October 2021.

=== Amendments ===
The Constitution may be amended by Act of Parliament. Amendments to certain defined clauses require the support of two thirds of all the members of each House.

==== Some amendments ====
- Barbados Independence Act 1966 (Cap. 37).
- Constitutional law 1966/Nov/17 - Includes the Barbados Independence Order, 1966 which establishes the judiciary, judicial procedures and parliament. The Constitution is included in the Schedule to the Order.
  - Chapter 1 stipulates that the Constitution is the supreme law
  - Chapter 2 Citizenship
  - Chapter 3 Protection of fundamental rights and freedoms of the individual
  - Chapter 4 The Governor-General
  - Chapter 5 Parliament
  - Chapter 6 Executive powers
  - Chapter 7 The judicature
  - Chapter 8 The public service
  - Chapter 9 Finance
  - Chapter 10 Miscellaneous and interpretation
- Barbados Independence Order 1966 (No. 1455). - 1966/Nov/22 (Date of entry into force: 1966-11-30)
- Barbados Constitution (First Amendment) Act (L.R.O. 1978). - Amends a large number of sections in the Constitution including: sections 3, 6, 7, 13, 22, 27, 37, 38, 39, 43, 44, 45, 79, 81, 82, 84, 89, 94, 95, 96, 97, 99, 100, 104, 105, 106, 112, 113, 117. In addition, the following new sections are inserted into the Constitution: 79A, 89A, 93A and 93B and 100A.
- Barbados Constitution (Second Amendment) Act, 1990. - Amendments relating primarily to the office of Judges.
- Barbados Constitution (Third Amendment) Act, 1992.
- Barbados Constitution (Fourth Amendment) Act, 1995 (No. 2 of 1995) - Inserts a new section 112A on remuneration of public officers and soldiers which provides that the salaries and allowances payable to the holders of offices established under the Civil Establishment Act and the Defence Act shall not be altered to their disadvantage.
- Barbados Constitution (Fifth Amendment) Act, 2002 (No. 14). - Amends Sections 15, 23 and 78 of Constitution. Establishes that imposition of mandatory sentence of death or execution thereof shall not be inconsistent with Section 15 of Constitution. Also provides for transfer between Barbados and other countries of persons detained in prisons, hospitals or other institutions by virtue of orders made in the course of the exercise by courts or tribunals of their jurisdiction.
- Barbados Constitution (Sixth Amendment) Act, 2003 (2003–10). - Amends Constitution of Barbados. Inter alia provides for establishment, composition and jurisdiction of Caribbean Court of Justice.
- Constitution (Seventh Amendment) Act, 2010–2.
- Constitution (Eighth Amendment) Act, 2018. Amends the Constitution of Barbados to revise the qualifications for membership of the Senate and the provisions relating to disqualification for membership of the Senate and the Assembly.
- Constitution (Ninth Amendment) (No. 2) Act, 2021. Introduced the office of President of Barbados, to replace the role of Elizabeth II, Queen of Barbados.

== Structure ==
- Constitutional Order

The Constitution of Barbados, is divided into a preamble, 10 parts and four schedules. They are set out as below.

=== Preamble ===
According to the Constitution:

- Whereas the love of free institutions and of independence has always strongly characterised the inhabitants of Barbados: And Whereas the Governor and the said inhabitants settled a Parliament in the year 1639:
- And Whereas as early as 18 February 1651 those inhabitants, in their determination to safeguard the freedom, safety and well-being of the Island, declared, through their Governor, Lords of the council and members of the Assembly, their independence of the Commonwealth of England:
- And Whereas the rights and privileges of the said inhabitants were confirmed by articles of agreement, commonly known as the Charter of Barbados, had, made and concluded on 11 January 1652 by and between the Commissioners of the Right Honourable the Lord Willoughby of Parham, Governor, of the one part, and the Commissioners on behalf of the Commonwealth of England, of the other part, in order to the rendition to the Commonwealth of England of the said Island of Barbados:
- And Whereas with the broadening down of freedom the people of Barbados have ever since then not only successfully resisted any attempt to impugn or diminish those rights and privileges so confirmed, but have consistently enlarged and extended them:

Now, therefore, the people of Barbados:

- § a. proclaim that they are a sovereign nation founded upon principles that acknowledge the supremacy of God, the dignity of the human person, their unshakeable faith in fundamental human rights and freedoms and the position of the family in a society of free men and free institutions;
- § b. affirm their belief that men and institutions remain free only when freedom is founded upon respect for moral and spiritual values and the rule of law;
- § c. declare their intention to establish and maintain a society in which all persons may, to the full extent of their capacity, play a due part in the institutions of the national life;
- § d. resolve that the operation of the economic system shall promote the general welfare by the equitable distribution of the material resources of the community, by the human conditions under which all men shall labour and by the undeviating recognition of ability, integrity and merit;
- § e. desire that the following provisions shall have effect as the Constitution of Barbados—

=== Chapter 1: The Constitution ===
- Section 1
- §1. ##*This Constitution is the supreme law of Barbados and, subject to the provisions of this Constitution, if any other law is inconsistent with this Constitution, this Constitution shall prevail and the other law shall, to the extent of the inconsistency, be void.

=== Chapter 2: Citizenship ===
Comprises sections 2–10.

- Becoming a citizen on Independence day (30 November). Born in Barbados on or after. Born outside Barbados on or after. Registration. Dual nationality. Legislation. Interpretation.
    - Persons who become citizens on 30 November 1966
    - Person entitled to be registered as citizens
    - Persons born in Barbados after 29 November 1966
    - Persons born outside Barbados after 29 November 1966
    - Marriage to citizen of Barbados
    - Renunciation of citizenship
    - Commonwealth citizens
    - Powers of Parliament
    - Interpretation

=== Chapter 3: Protection of Fundamental Rights and Freedoms of the Individual ===
Comprises sections 11–27. (Based upon European Convention on Human Rights)

- Fundamental rights and freedoms; rights to life, personal liberty, law, inhuman treatment, slavery and forced labour, arbitrary search and entry; freedom of movement, conscience, expression, assembly and association; privacy, work, racial discrimination, deprivation of property. Provisions for public emergencies, protection of detained persons under emergency laws. Enforcement. Existing laws. Interpretation and savings.
    - Fundamental rights and freedoms of the individual
    - Protection of right to life
    - Protection of right to personal liberty
    - Protection of freedom of expression
    - Protection of freedom of assembly and association
    - Protection of freedom of movement
    - Protection from discrimination on grounds of race, etc.
    - Enforcement of protective provisions
    - Time of emergency
    - Saving of existing law
    - Interpretation

=== Chapter 4: The President ===
Comprises sections 28-34H.

- Establishment. Election and impeachment procedures. Acting President. Oath. Exercise. Information on matters of government.
    - Office of President and Head of State
    - Qualification
    - Disqualifications
    - Determination of certain questions
    - Election of President
    - Acting President
    - Term of office
    - Conditions of office
    - Vacation of office
    - Removal from office
    - Procedure for removal from office
    - Oath
    - Personal staff of President
    - Exercise of President's functions
    - Immunities of President

=== Chapter 5: Parliament ===
Largest chapter, covering sections 35–62.

==== PART 1: Composition of Parliament ====
Comprises sections 35–47.

- Establishment, House of Assembly, Senate, Clerks to Houses.
    - Establishment of Parliament
    - Senate
      - Qualifications for membership of Senate
      - Disqualifications for membership of Senate
      - Tenure of seats of Senators
      - President and Deputy President of Senate
    - House of Assembly
      - Electoral law
      - Qualifications for membership of the Assembly
      - Disqualifications for membership of the Assembly
      - Tenure of seats of members of Assembly
    - Determination of questions of membership of Senate and Assembly
    - Filling of Casual Vacancies in Senate and Assembly

==== PART 2: Powers and Procedure of Parliament ====
Comprises sections 48–59.

- Legislative power and alteration of Constitution, Procedure and Oath, Voting, Bills and Quorums.
    - Power to make laws
    - Alteration of this Constitution
    - Regulation or procedure in Parliament
    - Presiding in Senate
    - Quorum of Senate
    - Voting in Senate
    - Introduction of Bills, etc.
    - Restriction on powers of Senate as to Money Bills
    - Restrictions on powers of Senate as to Bills other than Money Bills
    - Provisions relating to section 54, 55 and 56
    - Assent to Bills
    - Oath of allegiance
    - Session of Parliament

==== PART 3: Summoning, Prorogation and Dissolution ====
Comprises sections 60–62.

- Prorogation and Dissolution, General Elections, Electoral and Boundaries Commission, electoral divisions.
    - Prorogation and Dissolution of Parliament
    - General Election and Appointment of Senators

=== Chapter 6: The Executive Powers ===
Sections 63-79(A).

- Executive authority. Prime Minister, Performance of functions during absence or illness. Ministers of Government and portfolio allocation. Attorney General. Performance of ministerial functions. Cabinet. Ministers of State. Oath taken by Ministers, etc. Leader of the Opposition. Permanent Secretaries and Cabinet Secretary. Control of public prosecutions. Constitution of offices, etc. Prerogative of mercy. Procedure in capital cases. Barbados Privy Council.
    - Executive authority of Barbados
    - Cabinet
    - Appointment of Ministers
    - Tenure of office of Ministers
    - Performance of Prime Minister's functions in certain events
    - Temporary Ministers
    - Oaths to be taken by Ministers
    - Presiding in Cabinet
    - Governor General to be informed concerning matters of government
    - Assignment of responsibilities to Ministers
    - Parliamentary Secretaries
    - Leader of the Opposition
    - Certain vacancies in office of Leader of Opposition
    - Privy Council
    - Proceedings of Privy Council
    - Prerogative of Mercy
    - Establishment of office of Attorney-General and functions of Director of Public Prosecutions

=== Chapter 7: The Judicature ===
Comprises sections 79(B)-88.

==== PART 1: The Caribbean Court of Justice, the Supreme Court and the Magistrate's Courts ====
Sections 79(B)-84.

- Establishment of Supreme Court, Court of Appeal. Supreme Court. Court of Appeal. Originally, appeals to Her Majesty in Council; appeals to Privy Council since abolished by several Barbados Constitution Bills and replaced with the Caribbean Court of Justice.
    - Establishment of Supreme Court
    - Appointment of Judges
    - Acting Judges
    - Oaths to be taken by Judges
    - Tenure of office of Judges

==== Part 2: appeals ====
Sections 85–88. • Right to appeal judicial decisions, decisions of CCJ are final and cannot be appealed or enquiry in any tribunal or other court.

=== Chapter 8: The Public Service ===
Comprises sections 89–106.

==== Part 1. The Services Commissions ====
Sections 89-92(§3).

- Public Services Commission.
    - Establishment and composition of Judicial and legal Service Commission
    - Establishment and composition of Public Service Commission
    - Establishment and composition of Police Service Commission
    - Procedure of Commissions

==== Part 2. Appointment, Removal and Discipline of Public Officers ====
Sections 93–102.

- Appointment of public officers and other civil servants.
    - Appointment, etc., of judicial and legal officers
    - Appointment, etc., of public officers
    - Delegation of powers under section 94
    - Appointment, etc., of members of the Police Force
    - Delegation of powers under section 96
    - Appeals to privy Council in disciplinary matters
    - Appointment of permanent secretaries and certain other public officers
    - Appointment, etc., of principal representatives abroad and subordinate staff
    - Appointment, etc., of Director of Public Prosecutions
    - Appointment, etc., of Auditor General

==== Part 3. Pensions ====
Sections 103–104.

- Pensions. Gratuity and retirement
    - Protection of pension rights
    - Grant and withholding of pensions, etc.

==== Part 4. Miscellaneous ====
Sections 105–106.

- Discipline.
    - Removal from office of certain persons
    - Protection of Commissions, etc., from legal proceedings

=== Chapter 9: Finance ===
Sections 107–113.

- Consolidated Revenue Fund, Contingencies Fund. Remuneration, public debt and audit.
    - Consolidated Fund
    - Estimate
    - Authorization of expenditure
    - Meeting expenditure from consolidated Fund
    - Public debt
    - Remuneration of Governor General and certain other officers
    - Establishment of office and functions of Auditor-General

=== Chapter 10: Msicellaneous and Interpretation ===
Sections 114–117.

- Code of Conduct. National Symbols. Appointments. Removal and Resignations. Consultation. National Seal. Interpretation.
    - Appointments
    - Resignations
    - Vacation of office on attaining a prescribed age
    - Interpretation

=== First Schedule - Oaths ===
- Oath of Allegiance; Governor-General; Prime Minister/Minister/Parliamentary Secretary; Director of Public Prosecutions; Judicial Oath (Chief Justice/Justice of Appeal/Judge of the High Court); Judicial Oath for Judges of the Caribbean Court of Justice (President/Judge)

=== Second Schedule - Provisions Relating to Certain Tribunals ===
Sections 1–11.

- Tribunal vacancies, Records keeping, Brokering divided votes, rules creation and protection from liability, parity to Supreme Court, summons, disruption of proceedings, protection from self-incrimination

=== Third schedule - Rules Relating to the Constituencies ===
Sections 1–2.

  1. The electorate shall, so far as practicable, be equal in all constituencies: Provided that the electorate in any constituency shall, so far as practicable, not exceed 115%, nor be less than 85%, of the total electorate divided by the number of constituencies.
  2. Natural boundaries such as highways and rivers shall be used wherever possible.

== Criticisms ==
=== 2026 - Section 45 Amendment ===
In 2026, the ruling Barbados Labour Party administration coming out of the 11 February election won all available seats in the lower chamber for the third consecutive time, upon assuming the role as government again the Cabinet promptly announced it would pass Constitutional amendment forbidding any seating person in Parliament from becoming an independent member of parliament or formulating or joining another party without first vacating their seat and undergoing a costly by-election. The move was criticised by cross sections of the society and international organizations for its motives.

== See also ==
- Magna Carta
- Barbados and the Commonwealth of Nations
- Constitution of the United Kingdom
