= Timeline of Barbadian history =

This is a timeline of Barbadian history, comprising important legal and territorial changes and political events in Barbados and its predecessor states. To read about the background to these events, see History of Barbados and History of the Caribbean. See also the list of governors and prime ministers of Barbados.

== 16th century ==
Year	Date	Event
1511	23 December	Barbados first appears on Spanish maps and is referred to by King Ferdinand of Spain as Los Barbudos (Barbados), along with Cobaco (Tobago), and Mayo (unknown).
1512	3 July	King Ferdinand mentions that on the islands of Los Barbudos, Dominica, Martino (Martinique), Santa Lucia, San Vincente, La Asunción (Grenada), and Tavaco (Tobago), certain Indians called Caribs be captured due to their resistance towards Christianity.
1518		The Spanish crown ordered Judge Rodrigo de Figueroa to determine which areas of the region were populated by Caribs. He reported 'Indians have been taken from Los Barbudos, the Gigantes (Aruba, Bonaire and Curaçao) and elsewhere who are not Caribs nor proper to be slaves. Thereafter, the isles deemed to be non-Carib were: Trinidad, the Lucayas (Bahamas), Barbados, Gigantes and Margarita.
c. 1532-1536		Portuguese explorer Pedro A. Campos discovers Barbados completely uninhabited, the island is claimed for the Portuguese.
1541		Spanish commentator Alonza de Santa Cruz speaks of inhabitants of Barbados in the past-tense.

== 17th century ==
Year	Date	Event
1620		English Captain Simon Gordon may have first made a brief landing on Barbados. The Portuguese abandon Barbados.
1625		Courteen dispatched Captain John Powell for the purpose of establishing a permanent settlement on the island, but the ship returned to England having not been able to locate the island. (to 1627)
1625		Courteen dispatched a second envoy from England, led by Captain Henry Powell (brother of John Powell), on the ship known as the William and John.
1625	July	The passing trade ship, "Olive Blossom" owned by English merchant William Courteen (and led by Chief Captain John Powell), landed at St. James Town and erect a cross with the inscription "for James K. of E. and this island", other personal items are left behind prior to departing for England.
1627	17 February	Eighty English settlers, with ten African slaves (captured-at-sea) aboard the ship William and John land at St. James Town. (to 20 February)
1627	25 February	English king Charles I gave Courten by Royal Letters Patent the proprietary ownership and title to various lands in the Southern Americas (which Courten applies towards claim of Barbados).
1627	2 July	Charles gave James Hay, the 1st Earl of Carlisle by Royal Letters Patent the proprietary ownership to Caribbee islands lying between ten and twenty degrees of latitude.
1628	5 July	Lord Carlisle as represented by Governor Charles Wolferstone (of Bermuda) establishes a settlement and the capital moves from Courteen's settlement at St. James Town to present location of Bridgetown. Under the authority of the Wolverstone the Governor appoints a Council composed of the main landowners to assist him in the governance of the island.
1629		Forces of Carlisle's employ arrived in Barbados and arrested Courten's governor.
1629		The colony became divided into six original parishes. A vestry framework for local government is devised, and parishes are administered by elected landowners who had the powers to tax and carry out basic municipal functions, such as road maintenance.
1639		The parliament, (the House of Assembly then known as the House of Burgesses), held its first meeting. It was composed of sixteen landowners chosen by the Governor.
1640		Sugar cultivation begins on the island.
1642		English Civil War: Large influx of both English Parliamentarians, and Royalists to island. (to 1651)
1642		The British Parliament sends a fleet to blockade ports of Barbados, the island surrenders in December and agrees to recognise Charles II as King. (to 1651)
1645		The colony became re subdivided into eleven parishes, each sending two representatives to the House of Assembly.
1652	11 January	The Barbados Charter (Treaty of Oistins) is signed between locals and The Crown, of which articles of agreement confirm the Assembly, and liberty of conscience.
1652		The House and the Legislative Council (executive arm of government) began to hold separate sessions.
1668	18 April	The Bridgetown Magazine explodes, 80 Percent of Bridgetown (800 homes), are razed in a great fire.
1671	3 October	Quaker leader George Fox visits island.
1675	May	First slave rebellion.
1660		Charles II knights eleven gentlemen of Barbados. White indentured labourers (small-holders) are largely replaced by black slaves from West Africa (many from today's Ghana). (to 1680)
1680		White labourers mostly leave, to Carolinas, (Charleston, South Carolina); and to other West Indian islands, especially Jamaica.
1682		The sugar-producing planter class becomes dominant. They inter-marry with British aristocracy, and buy seats in the Parliament.

== 18th century ==
Year	Date	Event
1733		Harrison College (formerly Harrison's Free School), is established by Bridgetown-merchant Thomas Harrison.
1745		The Codrington College (grammar school), named after the late Christopher Codrington is established by the Anglican Church.
1750		The Grapefruit (Citrus Paradisi), then known as the "Forbidden Fruit Tree" is (for the first time), recorded through illustration in The Natural History of Barbados by Welshman, The Reverend Griffith Hughes.
1751	November	George Washington visits, making his only journey outside the American mainland. (to December)
1795		British government establishes a permanent land force in the eastern Caribbean, based in Barbados.

== 19th century ==
Year	Date	Event
1816	14–16 April	Bussa's Rebellion, the largest slave revolt in Barbadian history.
1831		Free coloured men who meet the property requirements, are given the right to vote for members of Parliament.
1833		The Slavery Abolition Act 1833 is passed, ending the practice of slavery throughout the British Empire.
1834		Slavery itself is abolished, and the descendants of enslaved and liberated Africans, which form the bulk of Barbados population begin a process of making inroads in society. Samuel Jackman Prescod becomes the first person of (partial) African descent to be elected to Parliament.
1835		The Police Force is established.
1861	29 March	The introduction of piped water in Bridgetown.
1867		The Harbour Police Force is established.
1875		Uprisings (now known as the "Confederation riots") occurred due to efforts by the Imperial Crown to establish a Crown Colony government consisting of Barbados and the Windward Islands. (to 1876)
1881		The Executive Council is created separate of the Upper House by an Act of local Parliament.
1882		The Harbour Police Force is merged into the land-based Police Force.
1885		Moves to Confederate isle with the Windward Islands is abandoned, the capital of the Windward Islands shifts to St. George, Grenada; and the island restores self-government as before.

== 20th century ==
Year	Date	Event
1928	May	The introduction of The St. Michael Girls School.
1934		Grantley Adams is elected to the House of Assembly.
1937	July	Riots occur in Bridgetown.
1938	March	The formation of the Barbados Progressive League-BPL. (The precursor of the Barbados Labour Party.)
1944		Women secure the right to vote.
1946		Election: The Barbados Labour Party-BLP, led by Grantley Adams becomes majority leader.
1951		Election: The first election with universal adult suffrage.
1954		Establishment of the "ministerial" system, with a cabinet, and the office of the Premier. Grantley Adams was appointed as the colony's first Premier.
1955		The Democratic Labour Party-DLP (led by Errol Barrow), was formed as a breakaway element from the Barbados Labour Party.
1955	22 September	Category 5 Hurricane Janet becomes the first hurricane to strike the island in 57 years since the 1898 Windward Islands Hurricane. It causes over 5 million dollars USD in damage and over 38 total deaths.
1956		Election: Won by Barbados Labour Party-BLP, led by Grantley Adams.
1958	3 January	Barbados joined ten other British West Indian territories to form the West Indies Federation, led by Grantley Adams as the Prime Minister.
1961		Election: Won by Democratic Labour Party-DLP, led by Errol Barrow who becomes Premier.
1961		Barbados achieves full internal self-government.
1961	10 March	The EC$28,000,000 Deep Water Harbour in Bridgetown is completed and officially opened. Construction commenced in 1956.
1962	31 May	The West Indies Federation government collapses due to internal conflicts, Barbados reverts to internal self-governance.
1963		The University of the West Indies opens a local campus at the Deep Water Harbour before moving to Cave Hill.
1964		The Legislative Council is replaced by the Senate.
1964		Voting age was reduced to 18.
1965		Barbados ends its usage of the British West Indies dollar ("WID$"), it is replaced by the Eastern Caribbean Dollar ("XCD$") at par.
1966	3 November	Election: Won by Democratic Labour Party-DLP, led by Errol Barrow and is the last election before independence.
1966	30 November	Barbados, (led by Errol Barrow as Prime Minister) received its independence from the United Kingdom
1966	7 December	Barbados via United Nations Security Council Resolution 230, is admitted to the United Nations.
1969		Barbados Community College (BCC) is established by the government of Barbados.
1969	1 April.	ANGLICAN CHURCH is disestablished by the ANGLICAN CHURCH (DATE OF DISESTABLISHMENT) ORDER, 1969, by the Minister under section 2 of the Anglican Church Act, Cap. 375.
1971		House of Assembly changes to 24 single member constituencies.
1971	9 September	Election: Won by Democratic Labour Party-DLP, led by Errol Barrow
1972	2 May	The local Central Bank was established by Act of parliament.
1973	4 July	The Treaty of Chaguaramas is signed by Barbados, Trinidad and Tobago, Jamaica and Guyana to form CARICOM.
1973	December	The initial Barbados dollar ("BBD$") notes are issued for circulation by the Central Bank of Barbados ending the relationship with the Eastern Caribbean dollar.
1976	2 September	Election: Won by Barbados Labour Party-BLP, led by J.M.G.M "Tom" Adams
1976	6 October	Cubana Flight 455 is bombed shortly after taking off from the Sir Grantley Adams International Airport.
1977	2 November	At the end of the Queen's Silver Jubilee, Concorde (G-BOAE) made its maiden voyage to Barbados; with Queen Elizabeth II experiencing her first supersonic flight to the United Kingdom.
1979	31 March	The United States Naval Facility (NAVFAC) officially closes at Harrison's Point, St. Lucy after being commissioned on 1 October 1957.
1981		House of Assembly changes to 27 single member constituencies.
1981	18 June	Election: Won by Barbados Labour Party-BLP led by J.M.G.M "Tom" Adams
1983	25 October	Operation Urgent Fury begins. The United States, along with Barbados and other Caribbean nations forming the Caribbean Peace Force, invade Grenada removing the communist regime in power in mere days.
1985	11 March	On the death of J.M.G.M. "Tom" Adams, Harold Bernard St. John becomes 3rd Prime Minister.
1986	28 May	Election: Won by Democratic Labour Party-DLP, led by Errol Barrow.
1986	6 August	Intel Corporation announces it will lay off 900 from its Barbados plant over next several months.
1987	1 June	On the death of Errol Barrow, Erskine Sandiford becomes 4th Prime Minister.
1989	8 March	The Queen marked the occasion of the 350th anniversary of the establishment of the Barbados Parliament. (to 11 March)
1991		Elections: Won by Democratic Labour Party-DLP, led by Erskine Sandiford.
1991		House of Assembly changes to 28 single member constituencies.
1994		Election: Won by Barbados Labour Party-BLP, led by Owen Arthur
1995	19 June	Dame Ruth Nita Barrow, the first woman to serve as Governor-General of Barbados, died Tuesday night after a stroke.
1999		Election: Won by Barbados Labour Party-BLP, led by Owen Arthur

== 21st century ==
Year	Date	Event
2003		House of Assembly changes to 30 single member constituencies.
2003	21 May	Election: Won by Barbados Labour Party-BLP, led by Owen Arthur
2003	30 August	The British Airways Concorde makes last commercial flight from Barbados to London.
2005	29 March	A riot and fire breaks out at HM Glendairy Prison causing military personnel to be drawn from surrounding islands to put down the uprising. (to 30 March)
2006	1 January	The Caribbean Single Market and Economy comes into being and is implemented.
2006	16 March	The Caribbean Court of Justice (CCJ) renders its first judgement, covering a libel case from Barbados – Rediffusion Service Ltd v. Asha Mirchandani Ram Mirchandani (McDonald Farms Ltd). The case is a formal end of Barbados' 170+ year long relationship with the London-based Judicial Committee of the Privy Council (JCPC).
2007	4 March	The Cricket World Cup is held in the West Indies region. Barbados hosts several of the Warm Up and Super 8 matches along with the Final. (to 28 April)
2008	15 January	Election: Won by Democratic Labour Party-DLP, led by David Thompson
2010	31 January	UK's Prince Harry and Prince Seeiso of Lesotho hosted the Sentebale Charity Polo Event in Barbados.
2010	30 April	Several nations in the region, host the ICC World Twenty20 event, this included the finals held in Barbados. (to 16 May)
2010	3 September	The Tudor Street store, Campus Trendz is razed in a brazen robbery. Leading to a national day of mourning on 10 September.
2010	23 October	On the death of David Thompson, Freundel Stuart becomes 7th Prime Minister.
2011	25 June	Historic Bridgetown and its Garrison were added as a World Heritage Site of UNESCO.
2011	September	The introduction of Sixth Form into The St. Michael School and The Christ Church Foundation School.
2013	February	Election: Won by Democratic Labour Party-DLP, led by Freundel Stuart
2017	5 December	The EU publishes a blacklist of 17 Non-EU jurisdictions, Barbados included, who are accused of offering tax avoidance schemes. Barbados would be later removed.
2018	24 May	Election: Won by Barbados Labour Party-BLP, led by Mia Mottley, party won all 30 seats of Parliament. Mottley becomes the first female Prime Minister of Barbados.
2020	17 March	The SARS-CoV2 pandemic was confirmed to have reached Barbados with the announcement of the first two cases.
2020	15 September	Governor General Sandra Mason announces Barbados's intent to remove the Monarchy of Barbados and to become a republic.
2021	9 April	La Soufrière volcano in St. Vincent begins erupting, leading to two weeks of ash fall over Barbados followed by gov't led national cleanup.
2021	20 October	Sandra Mason is elected by both houses of parliament to become the first President of Barbados.
2021	30 November	Barbados transitions from a Commonwealth realm to a Commonwealth republic after abolishing the Monarchy of Barbados.The position of Governor-General is replaced by the President.
2022	19 January	Election: Won by Barbados Labour Party-BLP, led by Mia Mottley, party won all 30 seats of Parliament for a consecutive time.
2022	26 January	Santia Bradshaw is made the first deputy prime minister after a 12-year vacancy of the position.
2022	20 June	A review commission is formed and sworn in by the acting President Jeffrey Gibson to begin the process of drafting a new constitution and is to be completed by the end of 2024.
2022	20 December	The high court rules Barbados' laws against buggery and "gross indecency" were unconstitutional and strikes them from the Sexual Offences Act decriminalising Same-sex sexual activity.
2024	1 June	Several nations in the West Indies and the United States of America, host the ICC World Twenty20 event, this included the finals held in Barbados. (to 29 June)
2025	1 October	CARICOM implements full free movement between four of its member countries, Barbados, Belize, Dominica and St. Vincent and the Grenadines under the Enhanced Cooperation Protocol to the Revised Treaty of Chaguaramas as another step towards regional integration.
2025	7 October	Jeffrey Bostic is elected by both houses of parliament to become the second President of Barbados.
2026	11 February	Election: Won by Barbados Labour Party-BLP, led by Mia Mottley, party won all 30 seats of Parliament for a 3rd time in a row.
