= 2017 in Barbados =

- Decades: 1990s; 2000s; 2010s; 2020s
- See also: Other events of 2017; Timeline of Barbadian history

This article lists events from the year 2017 in Barbados.

== Incumbents ==
- Monarch: Elizabeth II
- Governor-General: Elliott Belgrave (until 30 June); Philip Greaves (acting) (from 1 July)
- Prime Minister: Freundel Stuart

== Events ==
- September – Hurricane Irma

=== Sports ===
- 14 to 30 July – Barbados participated at the 2017 World Aquatics Championships with 4 competitors.
- 4 to 13 August – Barbados participated at the 2017 World Championships in Athletics with 7 competitors (5 men and 2 women) in 6 events.

== Deaths ==
- 13 July – Keith Baird, Barbadian-born American linguist (born 1923).
- 11 October – Clifford Husbands, politician and judge, Governor-General 1996–2011 (b. 1926).
- 9 December – Charles Skeete, economist and diplomat (born c. 1938).

== Links ==
Media related to 2017 in Barbados at Wikimedia Commons
