= 2026 in Barbados =

- Decades: 2000s; 2010s; 2020s
- See also: Other events of 2026; Timeline of Barbadian history

Events in the year 2026 in Barbados.

== Incumbents ==
- President: Jeffrey Bostic
- Prime Minister: Mia Mottley

== Events ==
- 11 February – 2026 Barbadian general election: The ruling Barbados Labour Party wins all 30 seats in the House of Assembly.
- 12 February – Mia Mottley is inaugurated for a third term as prime minister.
- 27 April – Acting Venezuelan president Delcy Rodríguez undertakes an official visit to Barbados.

== Holidays ==
- 1 January – New Year's Day
- 21 January – Errol Barrow Day
- 3 April – Good Friday
- 6 April – Easter Monday
- 28 April – National Heroes' Day
- 1 May – May Day
- 25 May – Whit Monday
- 1 August – Emancipation Day
- 3 August – Kadooment Day
- 30 November – Independence Day
- 25 December – Christmas Day
- 26 December – Boxing Day

== Deaths ==
- 13 June – Shelly-Ann Cox, 38, scientist.
- 17 July – Sir Garfield Sobers, 89, cricketer (Nottinghamshire, South Australia, West Indies)
- 18 November – Nigel Barrow, 89, minister for foreign affairs (1985–1986)

== See also ==
- 2020s
- 2026 Atlantic hurricane season
- 2026 in the Caribbean
