= Health in Barbados =

All Barbadian citizens are covered by universal health care at polyclinics and a single general hospital. Barbados ranked 37th out of 187 countries surveyed in the Human Development Index. According to the 2019 World Bank data, the life expectancy at birth in Barbados was 79 for men and 82 for women.

== History ==
American President George Washington accompanied his brother Lawrence to Barbados to help him recover from a bout of tuberculosis in the warm climate of the island in 1751. While there George contracted smallpox.

== Healthcare ==
Expenditure on health per capita in 2014 was $1,014, 7.5% of GDP. The country has above the average ratio of health care professionals to population.

All Barbadian citizens are covered by Universal health care. Barbados has eight polyclinics throughout the country, 5 Geriatric hospitals for care of the elderly, and a network of Child Care facilities, in addition to the main Queen Elizabeth Hospital (General Hospital) located in Bridgetown.

There are private medical clinics, including the Sandy Crest Medical Centre on the west coast, and the FMH Emergency Medical Clinic, just outside Bridgetown.

The Barbados Psychiatric Hospital is located in Black Rock, Bridgetown.

The Ministry of Health & Wellness also operates the Barbados Drug Service which provides a pharmacy service for the island.

In 2011, the Government of Barbados signed a memorandum of understanding to lease its 22 acres (8.9 ha) Saint Joseph Hospital site to the Denver, Colorado-based America World Clinics (now Traverse Global Healthcare). Under the deal, the group will use Barbados as one of its main destinations for medical tourism at that facility. The government also announced it would begin constructing a new $900 million state-of-the-art hospital to replace the Queen Elizabeth Hospital.

== See also ==
- List of hospitals in Barbados
