= 2021 in Barbados =

- Decades: 2000s; 2010s; 2020s
- See also: Other events of 2021; Timeline of Barbadian history

Events in the year 2021 in Barbados.

== Incumbents ==
- Monarch: Elizabeth II (to 30 November)
- Governor-General: Sandra Mason (to 30 November)
- President: Sandra Mason (from 30 November)
- Prime Minister: Mia Mottley

== Events ==
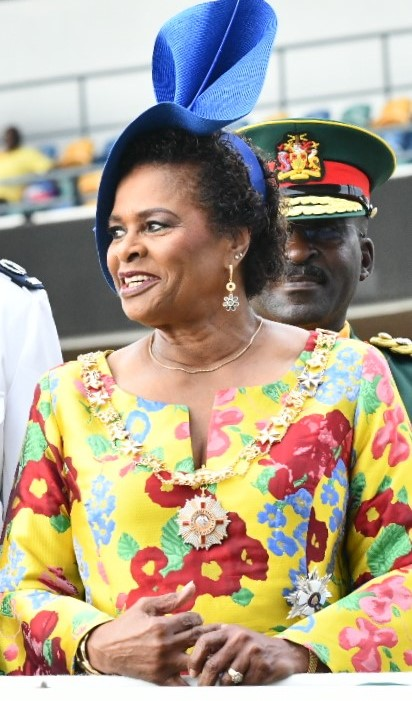
Sandra Mason becomes the first president of Barbados.

- Ongoing – COVID-19 pandemic in Barbados
- 27 July – Prime Minister Mia Mottley announced on the Day of National Significance in Barbados that her cabinet had decided that Barbados would become a parliamentary republic by 30 November, and accepted the recommendations of the Forde Commission
- 20 September – Constitution (Amendment) Bill 2021 was introduced to Parliament
- 28 September – the House of Assembly passed the Constitution (Amendment) Bill 2021
- 6 October – Senate passed the bill
- 12 October – incumbent Governor-Genera Sandra Mason was jointly nominated by Prime Minister Mottley and Joseph Atterley, leader of the opposition, as candidate for the first president of Barbados
- 30 November – Barbados becomes a republic, Dame Sandra Mason becomes president, replacing Elizabeth II as head of state.

== Deaths ==
- 23 January – Sylvanus Blackman, weightlifter (born 1933).
- 6 February – Ezra Moseley, cricketer (born 1958) (Glamorgan, West Indies cricket team, Barbados national cricket team); traffic collision.
- 16 March – Sir Courtney Blackman, economist and diplomat (born 1933).
