= 2022 in Barbados =

- Decades: 2000s; 2010s; 2020s
- See also: Other events of 2022; Timeline of Barbadian history

Events in the year 2022 in Barbados.

== Incumbents ==
- President: Sandra Mason
- Prime Minister: Mia Mottley

== Events ==
Ongoing – COVID-19 pandemic in Barbados

- 20 January – Mia Mottley and her Barbados Labour Party government are re-elected for a second term in a landslide, winning all 30 seats.
