= 2019 in Barbados =

- Decades: 1990s; 2000s; 2010s; 2020s
- See also: Other events of 2019; Timeline of Barbadian history

This article lists events from the year 2019 in Barbados.

== Incumbents ==
- Monarch: Elizabeth II
- Governor-General: Sandra Mason
- Prime Minister: Mia Mottley

== Events ==
- 8 June – The People's Party for Democracy and Development was founded.
- 18 October – Barbados at the 2019 Military World Games

== Death ==
- 21 March: Adzil Holder, 87, cricketer
- 6 May: Seymour Nurse, 85, cricketer (West Indies cricket team)
- 21 August: Richard Hoad, 88, Olympic sailor

== Links ==
Media related to 2019 in Barbados at Wikimedia Commons
