= 2023 in Barbados =

- Decades: 2000s; 2010s; 2020s
- See also: Other events of 2023; Timeline of Barbadian history

Events in the year 2023 in Barbados.

== Incumbents ==
- President: Sandra Mason
- Prime Minister: Mia Mottley

== Events ==
Ongoing – COVID-19 pandemic in Barbados

=== Scheduled ===
- 20 October – 5 November: Barbados at the 2023 Pan American Games
