= Campus Trendz arson attack =

2010 crime in Bridgetown, Barbados

Campus Trendz Arson Attack
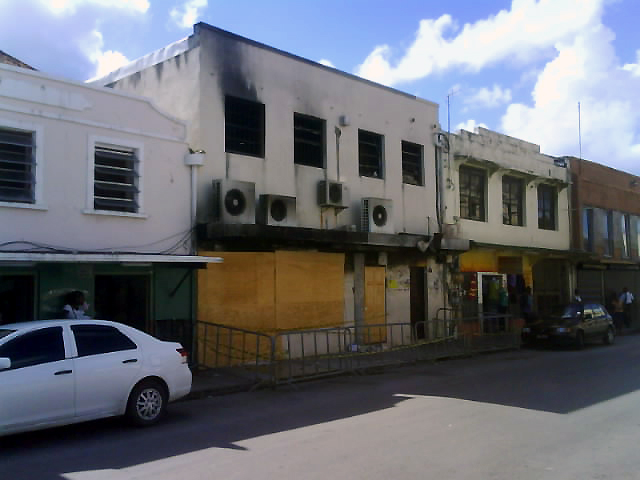
- Campus Trendz Boutique after the arson attack
- Location: Tudor Street, Bridgetown, St. Michael, Barbados
- Date: 3 September 2010; 5:00 p.m (UTC-04:00)
- Target: Campus Trendz
- Attack type: Arson, Burglary
- Weapons: Cutlass, Molotov cocktail
- Deaths: 6
- Injuries: 1
- Perpetrators: Renaldo Anderson Alleyne, Jamar DeWayne Bynoe

On the evening of 3 September 2010, Campus Trendz Boutique on Tudor Street, Bridgetown, Barbados was robbed and set on fire. The ensuing fire killed six people, all women, in one of the deadliest attacks since Barbados' independence in 1966. The perpetrators of the robbery and arson, Renaldo Anderson Alleyne and Jamar DeWayne Bynoe, were arrested and convicted.

== Incident ==
On 3 September 2010, at 5pm, two men, each armed with a cutlass, entered Campus Trendz Boutique with intent to commit burglary. The owner of the store was stabbed and the store was then robbed and set ablaze with two Molotov cocktails. Six women, three employees and three customers, escaped to the back of the store, where five of the women died from asphyxiation by smoke after being trapped by the flames. One woman died in the ambulance on the way to the hospital. The flames engulfed the two-storey building as firefighters arrived to prevent the flames from spreading to the other buildings. The flames subsided at 10:21pm. The building was demolished in March 2017.

== Investigation ==
By 6 September 2010, the Royal Barbados Police Force released a sketch of one of the perpetrators to the public and descriptions of both men to several eyewitnesses to assist in their apprehension. They were arrested by 13 September 2010.

== Aftermath ==
On 10 September 2010, a national day of mourning was declared.

21-year-old Renaldo Anderson Alleyne and 19-year-old Jamar DeWayne Bynoe were arrested and both charged with six counts of murder, aggravated burglary, and arson. Alleyne later plead guilty to 6 counts of manslaughter in June 2011, which was accepted by the Director of Public Prosecutions and was then sentenced to six concurrent life sentences on 12 August 2012. This sentence was appealed by Alleyne which eventually went before in the Caribbean Court of Justice on 5 December 2018 on who upheld the ruling stating that he should receive a minimum sentencing of 25 years. The first ruling for a minimum sentence in the court's history.

Bynoe, however, went to trial, initially unrepresented by an attorney-at-law but then later requested one. He was found guilty on 6 counts of murder in July 2016 and was given the death penalty, and was sentenced to be hanged. This was then appealed by Bynoe where the case went to the Court of Appeal where, on 7 June 2022, the murder conviction was upheld. The high court however, was ordered to vacate the death penalty and to re-sentence Bynoe. Bynoe's Attorney then attempted to appeal the murder conviction to the Caribbean Court of Justice which then later denied Bynoe special leave to do so.

Bynoe was sentenced on 25 October 2024 to 55 years in prison.

== See also ==
- Caribbean Court of Justice
- Timeline of Barbadian history
- Supreme Court of Judicature (Barbados)
