= 2025 in Barbados =

- Decades: 2000s; 2010s; 2020s
- See also: Other events of 2025; Timeline of Barbadian history

Events in the year 2025 in Barbados.

== Incumbents ==
- President:
  - Sandra Mason (until 30 November)
  - Jeffrey Bostic (since 30 November)
- Prime Minister: Mia Mottley

== Events ==
- 10 March – The Resilience and Regeneration Fund is introduced along with changes to excise taxes, new policies for property transfer tax and visitor driving permits.
- 22 March – The African Export–Import Bank (Afreximbank) announces plans to build a US$180 million Africa Trade Centre in Barbados.
- 30 April – Emily Odwin becomes the first Barbadian golfer to qualify for a major golf championship, qualifying for the 2025 U.S. Women's Open by finishing first in a qualifier in San Francisco.
- 10 June – The European Union removes Barbados from its list of high risk jurisdictions for money laundering and terrorism financing.
- 1 October – An agreement allowing absolute freedom of movement for nationals of Barbados, Belize, Dominica and Saint Vincent and the Grenadines travelling between their countries comes into effect.

== Holidays ==
- 1 January – New Year's Day
- 21 January – Errol Barrow Day
- 18 April – Good Friday
- 21 April – Easter Monday
- 28 April – National Heroes' Day
- 1 May – May Day
- 9 June – Whit Monday
- 1 August – Emancipation Day
- 4 August – Kadooment Day
- 30 November – Independence Day
- 1 December – Independence Day holiday
- 25 December – Christmas Day
- 26 December – Boxing Day

== Deaths ==
- 14 October – Drexel Gomez, 88, Bahamian-born bishop of Barbados (1972–1992)

== See also ==
- 2020s
- 2025 Atlantic hurricane season
- 2025 in the Caribbean
