= Saint Joseph Hospital, Barbados =

Saint Joseph Hospital
- Government of Barbados

Geography
- Location: Ashton Hall, Barbados
- Coordinates: 13.257746°N 59.629165°W (approx.)

Organisation
- Type: General
- Religious affiliation: formerly Roman Catholic

History
- Opened: 1966

Links
- Lists: Hospitals in Barbados

Founded in 1966, the Saint Joseph Hospital is a medical facility now owned by the Government of Barbados. It is located in Ashton Hall area, which is located in the parish of Saint Peter. The hospital once served alongside the main general Hospital. The St. Joseph Hospital primarily served the northern parts of the island. In January 2011 it was announced the entire hospital was to be leased to overseas investors who had interest in it for medical tourism. The government later announced the investor to be Denver, Colorado-based American World Clinics ("AWC") under at least a 25-year lease.

Originally the St. Joseph hospital was owned by the Roman Catholic church in Barbados. The hospital has become a political football between the two dominant Barbadian parties. On January 19, 1986, the hospital was closed by the then BLP-led Government of Barbados over the claim that the institution was losing money. Thereafter, following a change in administration to the DLP, the facility was renovated and reopened. However, in 1995 after a return of the BLP-administration the hospital was shut yet again.

In 2008, the Saint Joseph hospital once more has been discussed after the country's most recent change in political administration. There has been some reported overseas interest in the 22-acre (8.9 ha) facility to transform it into an offshore medical school facility or a hospital catering to overseas health and wellness based tourism. This moved had been called off roughly a year later.

== See also ==
- Queen Elizabeth Hospital, Bridgetown
