= Carlisle Burton =

Barbadian civil servant

Sir Carlisle Archibald Burton, Kt., OBE (1921 – 18 September 2012) was a Barbadian civil servant and public administrator. He served as Head of the Civil Service of Barbados and as Permanent Secretary to the Prime Minister, and was later Chairman of the Public Service Commission. He was a founding member and first president of the Barbados Association of Retired Persons (BARP). He wrote a history of cricket at Kensington Oval and co-edited a history of Barbadian cricket.

== Early life and education ==
Burton was born in Barbados in 1921. He was educated at Harrison College before entering the public service.

== Civil service career ==
Burton had a long career as a civil servant, serving in government ministries including Health, Education and the Prime Minister's Office. He rose to become Head of the Civil Service of Barbados, and after retirement served as Chairman of the Public Service Commission.

Burton helped establish the Government Printing Department (Government Printery) and the Central Emergency Relief Organisation (CERO) in Barbados. He was also associated with the Arnott Cato Foundation, which supports human resources development at the Queen Elizabeth Hospital.

He assisted in the establishment of the Caribbean Centre for Development Administration (CARICAD), a regional body supporting public administration reform across the Commonwealth Caribbean.

== Commonwealth election observer service ==
In 1980, Burton served as a member of the Commonwealth Observer Group sent to monitor the elections leading to the independence of Zimbabwe (then Rhodesia). He was listed in the Group's final report as an Observer for Matabeleland South Province, based at Bulawayo and Gwanda, and was identified in the report by his official titles of Permanent Secretary to the Prime Minister and Head of the Civil Service of Barbados.

== Work in Montserrat ==
In 1984, Burton wrote the Management Handbook for the Government of Montserrat, sponsored by the British Development Division in the Caribbean. The handbook covers management practices, administrative procedures and public service organisation for the Government.

== Other public roles ==
Burton was a founding member and the first president of the Barbados Association of Retired Persons (BARP).

He also served for several years as chairman of the board of the University of the West Indies Cave Hill Campus.

== Cricket historian ==
Burton is credited as a co-editor, with Keith A. P. Sandiford and Ronald Hughes, of 100 Years of Organised Cricket in Barbados, 1892–1992.

He wrote, with Keith A. P. Sandiford, Cricket at Kensington 1895–2004, a history of cricket at Kensington Oval in Bridgetown. It was his only authored book.

== Honours ==
Burton was appointed an Officer of the Order of the British Empire (OBE) for services to public administration, and was later knighted, becoming known as Sir Carlisle Burton.

== Personal life ==
Burton married Hyacinth Burton, who survived him and died in 2019 at the age of 96.

== Death ==
Sir Carlisle Burton died at the Queen Elizabeth Hospital on 18 September 2012, aged 91, following a brief illness. His funeral was held on 25 September 2012 at St Mary's Anglican Church, Bridgetown, and was attended by a large congregation including representatives of the Barbados Cricket Association, the University of the West Indies Cave Hill Campus, and the Barbados Association of Retired Persons. BARP opened a book of condolence in recognition of his contribution to Barbadian public life.

== Selected works ==
- Sir Carlisle Burton, Management Handbook for Government of Montserrat, British Development Division in the Caribbean and Government of Montserrat, 1984.
- Keith A. P. Sandiford and Carlisle Burton, Cricket at Kensington 1895–2004, Barbados Cricket Association, 2004.
- Keith A. P. Sandiford, Ronald Hughes and Carlisle Burton (eds.), 100 Years of Organised Cricket in Barbados, 1892–1992, Barbados Cricket Association, 1992.
