= 2018 in Barbados =

- Decades: 1990s; 2000s; 2010s; 2020s
- See also: Other events of 2018; Timeline of Barbadian history

Events in the year 2018 in Barbados.

== Incumbents ==
- Monarch: Elizabeth II
- Governor-General: Philip Greaves (until 8 January), Sandra Mason (starting 8 January)
- Prime Minister: Freundel Stuart (until 25 May), Mia Mottley (starting 25 May)

== Events ==
- 4 April: Barbados at the 2018 Commonwealth Games
- 24 May: 2018 Barbadian general election

== Deaths ==
- 18 September: Livingstone Puckerin, 49, cricketer
