= 2020 in Barbados =

- Decades: 2000s; 2010s; 2020s
- See also: Other events of 2020; Timeline of Barbadian history

This article lists events from the year 2020 in Barbados.

== Incumbents ==
- Monarch: Elizabeth II
- Governor-General: Sandra Mason
- Prime Minister: Mia Mottley

== Events ==
- 17 March – The Minister of Health and Wellness, Lt Col Jeffrey Bostic confirmed the first two cases in Barbados.
- 26 March – The Prime Minister declares a public health emergency and puts into effect a curfew from 28 March to 14 April. Private sector businesses would be closed starting 28 March until the 15 of April, except for those excluded by the government such as groceries, pharmacies, gas stations and farms, which each have specific allowed operating hours. Restaurants remain open but only for drive-through and take away services. Anyone who does not follow the new order without proper explanation is now liable to a fine of BBD $50,000, one year in prison, or both.
- 15 September - Barbados Governor General Sandra Mason, delivering a speech on behalf of Prime Minister Mia Mottley, announced Barbados' intention of removing Queen Elizabeth II as the country's head of state and to become a republic in November 2021.

== Links ==
Media related to 2020 in Barbados at Wikimedia Commons
