= Elliott Belgrave =

Governor-General of Barbados

Sir Elliott Belgrave GCMG KA CHB KStJ SC
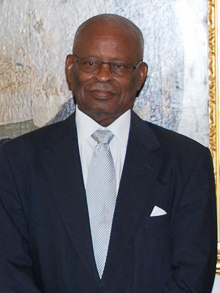
- Belgrave in 2016

7th Governor-General of Barbados
- In office 1 June 2012 – 30 June 2017; Acting: 1 November 2011 – 31 May 2012
- Monarch: Elizabeth II
- Prime Minister: Freundel Stuart
- Preceded by: Clifford Husbands
- Succeeded by: Philip Greaves (acting)

Personal details
- Born: Elliott Fitzroy Belgrave; 16 March 1931 (age 95) Boscobel, British Windward Islands (present day Barbados)
- Spouse: Loretta Belgrave
- Children: 1 daughter
- Education: University College London; Darwin College, Cambridge

Sir Elliott Fitzroy Belgrave, GCMG, KA, CHB, KStJ, SC (born 16 March 1931) is a retired Barbadian High Court Judge who served as the seventh governor-general of Barbados from 1 June 2012 to 30 June 2017. He previously served as Acting Governor-General from 1 November 2011 to 1 June 2012 (following the retirement of Clifford Husbands). On 22 May 2012, the prime minister of Barbados announced that Belgrave would be appointed as the 7th Barbadian Governor-General of Queen Elizabeth II. In preparation, Justice Sandra Mason was appointed as acting Governor-General on 30 May 2012 pending Belgrave's preparation for his own oath-taking ceremony on 1 June.

== Education and career ==
Belgrave is a graduate of University College London (LLB, 1962) and Cambridge (MPhil Criminology, 1979) from Darwin College, Cambridge. He served as Director of Public Prosecutions in Barbados and as Judge of the Supreme Court and Court of Appeal of Barbados. He is a Queen's Counsel and was awarded the Companion of Honour of Barbados for his contribution to the legal system in Barbados. In December 2016 it was reported that Belgrave was approaching personal retirement from the post of Governor-General.

== Personal life ==
He is married to Loretta Belgrave, and together they have a daughter named Susan Matheson. He is a Freemason, and a Past District Grand Master of the District Grand Lodge of Barbados (Scottish Constitution).

== Honours ==
He was appointed Knight Grand Cross of the Order of St Michael and St George on 8 June 2012. He is a Companion of Honour of Barbados.

Political offices
Preceded by Clifford Husbands	Governor General of Barbados; 2012–2017	Succeeded by Philip Greaves; Acting
