= Clifford Husbands =

Barbadian judge

Sir Clifford Husbands GCMG KStJ KA QC

6th Governor-General of Barbados
- In office 1 June 1996 – 31 October 2011
- Monarch: Elizabeth II
- Prime Minister: Owen Arthur; David Thompson; Freundel Stuart
- Preceded by: Nita Barrow
- Succeeded by: Elliott Belgrave

Personal details
- Born: 5 August 1926 Morgan Lewis Plantation, Saint Andrew, Colony of Barbados
- Died: 11 October 2017 (aged 91) Saint James, Barbados
- Spouse: Ruby Parris
- Children: 3

Clifford Straughn Husbands GCMG KStJ KA QC (5 August 1926 – 11 October 2017) was a Barbadian jurist who served as the 6th Governor-General of Barbados from 1996 to 2011, and was the longest-serving head of state in Barbadian history. Prior to his tenure as governor-general he was a member of the Supreme Court of Judicature.

== Early life and education ==
Clifford Straughn Husbands was born in Morgan Lewis Plantation in Saint Andrew, Barbados, on 5 August 1926. He was educated at Selah Boy’s Elementary School from 1931 to 1936, and Parry School and Harrison College from 1936 to 1946. He travelled to the United Kingdom for legal training at the Middle Temple and was admitted to the bar in 1952.

== Career ==
Husbands worked at a private practice from 1952 to 1954, and worked across Barbados, Grenada, Antigua, Montserrat, and elsewhere before returning to Barbados in 1960. He was a Legal Draughtsman from 1960 to 1963, and Assistant to the Attorney General from 1963 to 1967. He was appointed director of public prosecutions in 1967, and became a Queen's Counsel in 1968.

In 1976, Husbands was appointed to the Supreme Court of Judicature and served as chief justice multiple times.

Governor-General Nita Barrow died in office on 19 December 1995. Queen Elizabeth II appointed Husbands as Governor-General of Barbados on 1 June 1996. Husbands retired as governor-general on 31 October 2011. He was the second governor-general of Barbados, the first being Hugh Springer, to retire rather than die in office. Husbands was the longest-serving head of state in Barbadian history. Elliott Belgrave succeeded Husbands as the acting governor-general.

== Personal life ==
Husbands married Ruby Parris, with whom he had three children before her death in 2009. Husbands died on 11 October 2017, in Saint James, Barbados.

The Gold Crown of Merit was awarded to Husbands in 1986. He was made a knight of St Andrew to commemorate his legal career in 1995, and a knight in the Order of St Michael and St George upon his appointment as governor-general in 1996. He was made a member of the Order of Saint John in 2004.

== Works cited ==
=== Books ===
- East, Roger; Thomas, Richard (2014). Profiles of People in Power: The World's Government Leaders. Routledge. ISBN 1317639405.

=== News ===
- "Former Barbados Governor-General Sir Clifford Husbands is dead". Times Caribbean Online. 12 October 2017. Archived from the original on 18 May 2026.
- "Former Governor General Sir Clifford Husband dies". Nation Newspaper. 12 October 2017. Archived from the original on 18 May 2026.
- "Governor General retiring". The Barbados Advocate. 30 October 2011. Archived from the original on 23 September 2015.
- "Order of St John". The London Gazette. 19 April 2004. Archived from the original on 18 May 2026.
- "Sir Clifford resigns". Nation Newspaper. 30 October 2011. Archived from the original on 18 May 2026.

=== Web ===
- Blackman, Theresa (7 July 2009). "Official Funeral For Lady Husbands". Barbados Government Information Service. Archived from the original on 4 March 2016.

Government offices
Preceded by Denys Williams	Governor-General of Barbados; 1996–2011	Succeeded by Elliott Belgrave
