= 2025 Barbadian presidential election =

Election of Jeffrey Bostic

- 7 October 2025

51 members of the Parliament of Barbados (30 MPs and 21 Senators) 20 House and 14 Senate votes needed to win
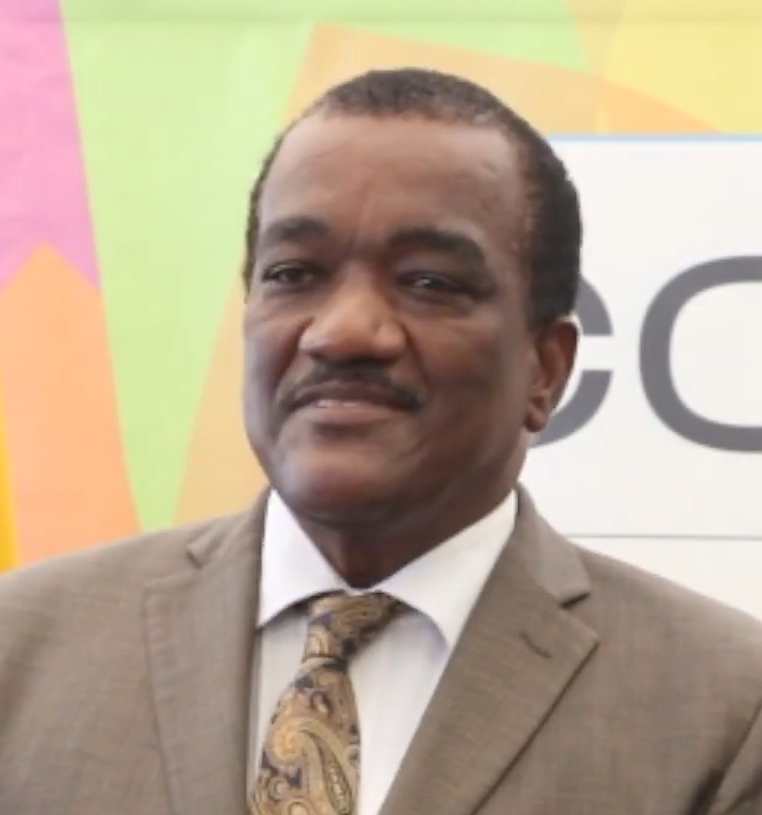
Nominee	Jeffrey Bostic
Party	BLP
Alliance	BLP, DLP
Electoral vote	Unopposed 100%
President before election
Dame Sandra Mason
Independent
Elected President
Jeffrey Bostic
BLP

The 2025 Barbadian presidential election was held on 7 October 2025 to choose the second president of Barbados. Dame Sandra Mason, the inaugural president elected to replace Queen Elizabeth II as head of state of Barbados in 2021, completed her term on 29 November 2025, and chose to retire rather than run for a second term.

Lt. Col. Jeffrey Bostic was nominated jointly on 16 September 2025, thereby making him the only candidate to be presented for this election. His candidacy was not objected to in the joint sitting of Parliament in which the election took place. Thus, he was acclaimed as President-elect, in accordance with the Constitution, in a walkover and was sworn in on 30 November 2025.

== Electoral system ==
The president is elected indirectly by the Parliament of Barbados in the context of a joint sitting of Parliament.

The prime minister and the leader of the opposition jointly nominate a consensus candidate 90 days before the incumbent's term is due to expire, who is then elected in a walkover without a vote unless any MP lodges their objection. If an objection is lodged, the joint sitting is suspended and the two Houses of Parliament, the Senate and the House of Assembly, meet separately and each vote on accepting or rejecting the nominee. A two-thirds majority of valid votes in each house separately is then required to elect a candidate on all rounds of balloting.

If no consensus candidate is nominated by the 60th day before the end of the incumbent's term, the election is opened to other candidates. To gain ballot access in such an open election, a candidate must be nominated either by the prime minister, the leader of the Opposition, or at least ten members of the House of Assembly. The requirement for a two-thirds majority of valid votes in each house separately also applies in an open election; this means that if only one candidate has been nominated, the voting system is the same as when a consensus candidate has been objected to.

== Candidate ==
Lt. Col. Jeffrey Bostic, the former Minister of Health and Wellness, military officer and member of parliament for the City of Bridgetown, was the only candidate for the office; he was nominated jointly by the prime minister, Mia Mottley, and the leader of the opposition, Ralph Thorne.

Bostic was widely commended by the Barbadian public for his work in leading the island's response to the COVID-19 pandemic, and for that reason, was awarded the Order of Freedom of Barbados on 28 April 2022, the island's National Heroes Day.

Given there were no objections at the joint sitting of Parliament, Bostic was declared elected without a vote on 7 October 2025. Due to his election, Bostic was sworn in 30 November, which was the 59th anniversary of Barbadian independence.
