= 2024 in Barbados =

- Decades: 2000s; 2010s; 2020s
- See also: Other events of 2024; Timeline of Barbadian history

Events in the year 2024 in Barbados.

== Incumbents ==
- President: Sandra Mason
- Prime Minister: Mia Mottley

== Events ==
=== February ===
- 23 February – The Financial Action Task Force removes Barbados from its "gray list" of countries not fully complying with measures to combat money laundering and terrorism financing.

=== April ===
- 23 April – Prime Minister Mia Mottley announces Barbados' pausing of the planned acquisition of land at the Drax Hall Estate, amid calls for UK MP Richard Drax to transfer it as a reparations gesture.

=== June ===
- 29 June – The ICC Men's T20 World Cup Final is held at Kensington Oval, Bridgetown, where India defeats South Africa by seven runs to win the tournament.

=== July ===
- 26 July-11 August – Barbados at the 2024 Summer Olympics

=== August ===
- The Employment Rights Tribunal dismisses a gender discrimination complaint from a transgender woman, ruling that transgender people are not legally recognized and recommending legislative action.

=== September ===
- 25 September – The third Bridgetown Initiative calls for a new World Bank emergency liquidity facility for climate-vulnerable countries and reforms of international financial institutions.

=== December ===
- 2 December – Barbados completes the world’s first debt-for-climate resilience swap, freeing $165 million for water, agriculture, and environmental projects.

== Holidays ==
- 1 January – New Year's Day
- 21 January – Errol Barrow Day
- 29 March – Good Friday
- 1 April – Easter Monday
- 28 April – National Heroes' Day
- 1 May – May Day
- 20 May – Whit Monday
- 1 August – Emancipation Day
- 5 August – Kadooment Day
- 30 November – Independence Day
- 25 December – Christmas Day
- 26 December – Boxing Day

== See also ==
- 2020s
- 2024 Atlantic hurricane season
- 2024 in the Caribbean
