= Massy Foundation =

Charitable trust in Trinidad and Tobago

The Massy Foundation is a charitable trust established in 1979 in Port of Spain, Trinidad and Tobago.

Christina Johnson is the director and treasurer. The trust is supported by the Massy Group

The Massy Foundation supported a Dental Health Promotion Project for Secondary School Students in Barbados in November 2018 by donating just under BDS$23000. It provided $143,983 to fund the Barbados Diabetes Reversal/Remission Study 2.

It was one of the sponsors of the National Secondary Schools Entrepreneurship competition in Trinidad in 2018.

Following Hurricane Maria in 2017, the Massy Foundation supported Caribbean Life Management Solutions to visit Dominica.

It provides financial support to the Wheelchair Foundation of Barbados and the Heart & Stroke Foundation of Barbados.
