= Adzil Holder =

Barbadian cricketer (1931–2019)

Personal information
- Full name: Adzil Harcourt Holder
- Born: 22 October 1931; Joe's River, Saint Joseph, Barbados
- Died: 21 March 2019 (aged 87); Foul Bay, Saint Philip, Barbados
- Batting: Right-handed
- Bowling: Slow left-arm orthodox

Domestic team information
- Years: Team
- 1951-52 to 1958-59: Barbados

Career statistics
| Competition | First-class |
|---|---|
| Matches | 11 |
| Runs scored | 251 |
| Batting average | 20.91 |
| 100s/50s | 0/1 |
| Top score | 52 |
| Balls bowled | 2406 |
| Wickets | 26 |
| Bowling average | 34.92 |
| 5 wickets in innings | 3 |
| 10 wickets in match | 0 |
| Best bowling | 7/38 |
| Catches/stumpings | 5/– |
- Source: Cricinfo, 26 June 2018

Adzil Harcourt Holder (22 October 1931 – 21 March 2019) was a Barbadian cricketer who played first-class cricket for Barbados from 1951 to 1959.

Holder's outstanding match was against Trinidad in 1956–57, when he took 7 for 38 with his left-arm spin in the first innings and then made 52 batting at number 10, he and Frank King added 78 for the last wicket in 64 minutes; Barbados won by an innings. Later that season he played in the 12-a-side trial matches for the forthcoming tour of England. He took 6 for 60 in the second innings of the second trial match, but was not selected for the tour.

He later went to Scotland, where he played as a professional for the Ferguslie, Clydesdale, and Clackmannan County clubs.

Holder and his wife Winifred had two daughters.
