= Keith Baird =

American educator and linguist (1923–2017)

Keith Ethelbert Baird
- Born: 20 January 1923; Arch Hall, Saint Thomas, Barbados
- Died: 13 July 2017 (aged 94); Atlanta, Georgia, United States
- Education: Columbia University; Union Institute & University
- Occupations: Educator, linguist

Keith Ethelbert Baird (20 January 1923 – 13 July 2017) was a Barbados-born American educator and linguist, whose work in linguistic anthropology and the politics of language is considered trailblazing. At a 1966 conference in Washington, DC, Baird argued convincingly that the word Negro "is used solely to describe the slaved and the enslavable", and that instead the description Afro-American should be used.

== Biography ==
Baird was born in Arch Hall, St. Thomas Parish, in the then British colony of Barbados, West Indies, and in 1947 at the age of 24 travelled to the U.S., where he studied at Columbia University, earning a bachelor's degree in romance philology and linguistics. He went on to receive a doctorate in socio-linguistics from the Union Institute & University in Cincinnati, Ohio.

He taught in the New York City school system between 1964 and 1969, and was a founding member of the African-American Teachers Association. At a conference in 1966 in Washington, DC, he advocated convincingly for the use of the description "Afro-American" to replace the word "Negro", which he said was "used solely to describe the slaved and the enslavable". Writing in the journal Social Casework in 1970, he argued for the "semantic liberation" of African Americans, since they — rather than the "conquerors" who had brought their ancestors to the Americas in chains — must dictate the terms that should be used to describe themselves and their community.

Baird became fluent in 14 languages and wrote several books on linguistics, as well as articles and book reviews. Believing that language is a political tool to be used for liberation and enlightenment, he pioneered the teaching of an African language — Ki-Swahili — at the City University of New York while he was professor and director of Afro-American Studies in the Black and Puerto Rican Studies Department at Hunter College. Other academic institutions where he held positions include Hofstra University and Buffalo State College of the State University of New York, and he was also a visiting professor at Georgia Institute of Technology and Clark Atlanta University.

He has been described by Molefi Asante, chair of African-American studies at Temple University, as "one of the pillars of Pan-Africanism, with a perspective that included the Caribbean, the United States and Africa".

Baird died in Atlanta, Georgia, aged 94, from myelodysplastic syndrome.
