= Order of Freedom of Barbados =

Second highest honour in Barbados

- Neck badge worn by members of the Order of Freedom of Barbados

Awarded by President of Barbados
- Type: National Honour
- Established: 19 August 2019; 6 years ago
- Eligibility: Citizens of Barbados, or persons born in Barbados; others may receive an honorary award.
- Criteria: At the pleasure of the president on the recommendation of the government
- Status: Currently constituted
- Founder: Parliament of Barbados
- Chancellor: Jeffrey Bostic
- Secretary: Vacant
- Classes: Member (FB)

Statistics
- First induction: 2019
- Last induction: 2024
- Total inductees: 14

Precedence
- Next (higher): Order of National Heroes
- Next (lower): Order of the Republic
- Ribbon of the Order of Freedom of Barbados

The Order of Freedom of Barbados is a national honour established by the Order of Freedom of Barbados Act 2019 by the Parliament of Barbados. As part within the overarching Order of Barbados, it ranks higher than the Order of the Republic, but is below the separate and supreme Order of National Heroes.

== Officers and classes ==
The Order consists of one Class, which is not named in the Act. There is no limit as to how many appointments can be made to each grade each year, except in regard to honorary members, whose limit is set to two a year; appointments are made each year on Independence Day (30 November) by the president on the advice of the Prime Minister.

Recipients are entitled to use the post-nominal letters "FB", which means "Freedom of Barbados", and to the style The Most Honourable. The insignia of the Order is set by the Prime Minister.

=== List of officers ===
The current officers of the Order of Barbados, in accordance with the Act, are:

- Chancellor: President Jeffrey Bostic
- Secretary: vacant (2021–present)

== Recipients ==
- Professor Violet Eudine Barriteau GCM – For her outstanding contribution to tertiary education and pioneering leadership in the development of gender studies and the promotion of gender equality.
- Dr. Anthony Nicholas Carter BSS – For his seminal work in music, in particular, his contribution to the art form of calypso, as well as, folk music through an exceptional repertoire of lyrics and melody, and his work with youth in music.
- Patrick Douglas Frost SCM, BJH – For his dedicated service as an educator and sterling contribution to the trade union movement.
- Dame Sandra Mason GCMG, DA, SC – Conferred on becoming the first president of Barbados in light of the transition to republican status.
- Ian St Clair Carrington – For his distinguished career in the public service and exceptional leadership of the Barbados Economic Recovery and Transformation programme.
- Elton Deighton “Elombe” Mottley – For his distinguished service as a culturalist and outstanding contribution to the promotion of the cultural arts and fostering national identity in Barbados.
- Ralph Samuel Decoursey “Bizzy” Williams – For his outstanding contribution as an entrepreneur and a pioneer of the green economic development in Barbados.
- Kerryann Ifill – For her distinguished service in the Senate and outstanding contribution to the enfranchisement of persons living with disabilities through education, employment and exposure.
- Reginald Richardo Farley – For his distinguished career as a policymaker, diplomat, leader of industry and Accountant, his sterling contribution to national and business development as well as the cohesion of the social partnership and his exceptional leadership of the Honourable The Senate.
- Dodridge Denton Miller – For his exceptional career in local and regional banking, Caribbean money management and entrepreneurship and his sterling contribution as a transformational and international financial leader.

=== Honorary recipients ===
- King Charles III – then known as the Prince of Wales as heir to the Barbadian throne, in recognition of his support for the efforts of developing countries in the area of climate change and sustainable development and fostering the spirit of entrepreneurship among young people globally.
- Uhuru Kenyatta – former President of Kenya.
- Irfaan Ali – President of Guyana.
- Narendra Modi – Prime Minister of India.
