= COVID-19 pandemic in Barbados =

Ongoing COVID-19 viral pandemic in Barbados

- Disease: COVID-19
- Pathogen: SARS-CoV-2
- Location: Barbados
- First outbreak: Wuhan, Hubei, China
- Arrival date: 17 March 2020 (6 years, 4 months, 2 weeks and 2 days)
- Confirmed cases: 109,147 (updated 17 July 2026)
- Deaths: 593 (updated 17 July 2026)
- Fatality rate: 0.54%
- Vaccinations: 163,853 (total vaccinated); 155,047 (fully vaccinated); 384,049 (doses administered)

Government website
- gisbarbados.gov.bb/covid-19

The COVID-19 pandemic in Barbados was a part of the COVID-19 pandemic of coronavirus disease 2019 (COVID-19). The outbreak was identified in Wuhan, Hubei, China, in December 2019, declared to be a Public Health Emergency of International Concern on 30 January 2020, and recognized as a pandemic by the World Health Organization on 11 March 2020. COVID-19 is an infectious disease caused by severe acute respiratory syndrome coronavirus 2 (SARS-CoV-2). The case fatality rate for COVID-19 has been much lower than for other coronavirus respiratory infections such as SARS and MERS, but the transmission has been significantly greater, with a significant total death toll.

The pandemic was confirmed to have reached Barbados on 17 March 2020 with the announcement of the first two cases, and at its current peak on 12 April there were 56 active cases. The government declared a public health emergency (due to end on 30 June) and the country is currently under an overnight curfew from 8:00 pm to 5:00 am (due to end after 17 May): many businesses are closed and many of the businesses that are allowed to open are subject to a surname-based schedule.

== Timeline ==
=== March 2020 ===
On 17 March 2020, the Minister of Health and Wellness, Lt Col Jeffrey Bostic confirmed the first two cases in Barbados. They were to remain in isolation until they recovered. Two days later, three more cases were confirmed, including the husband of the first case, as well as a cruise ship passenger and a person from New York. By 24 March, there had been 18 confirmed cases in total.

On 26 March 2020, Prime Minister Mia Mottley announced that the country reached 24 cases and would be entering stage three of the COVID-19 National Preparedness Plan. A public health emergency was declared and a curfew would be in effect from 28 March to 14 April, from 8:00 p.m. to 6:00 a.m., with limited movement during the day. Businesses in the private sector would be closed from 28 March 2020 by 8:00 pm until 15 April 2020, except for those excluded by the government such as grocers, pharmacies, gas stations and farms, with specific allowed operating hours for each business type. Restaurants would still be allowed to open but only for drive-through and take-away services. People contravening the order without a reasonable explanation would be liable to a fine of BBD $50,000, one year in prison, or both.

The next day, the Minister of Health announced that the total number of cases at 26. By that date, Barbados had conducted 234 tests overall. Two days later, Acting Chief Medical Officer, Dr. Anton Best, announced seven more cases taking the total number of cases up to 33: Of those cases 19 were imported, 11 were identified through contact tracing, and 2 were still being investigated. By that date, Barbados had conducted 287 tests overall, and there was no evidence of community spread.

On 30 March 2020, Bostic announced another new case, bringing the total number of confirmed cases to 34.

=== April 2020 ===
On 1 April 2020, acting Prime Minister Santia Bradshaw announced that 11 tests were positive the day before, bringing the total number of confirmed cases to 45 and the total number of tests performed to 382. The next day, Bradshaw announced that because people were still congregating in large groups despite previous measures, Barbados would be placed under a 24-hour curfew from 3 April 2020 at 6:00 pm. From that date, all supermarkets, mini marts, restaurants, government offices, departments and statutory corporations would be closed, the sale of alcohol would be prohibited, and people would only be allowed to leave their homes to "go to the pharmacy, to seek medical assistance, or if you are part of the essential services, or if you are doing business with any of the businesses, which are exempted under this Order". Some food sellers, such as bakeries, bread depots and "village shops" would be allowed to operate during designated hours, but could have no more than three people congregating at a time. On 3 April 2020, the start of the curfew was delayed until 8:00 pm. to allow workers time to go home after shutting up.

By 4 April 2020, there had been 52 confirmed cases in total, with ages ranging form 17 to 83 years old. By that date all cases were still active—there had been no deaths nor recoveries.

The next day, Barbados announced its first COVID-19-related death, an 81-year-old male with underlying conditions who had returned to the country from the UK on 22 March, as well as its first six recoveries: four males and two females who would be discharged from isolation in medical facilities that day. Four new cases were also announced, bringing the total number of confirmed cases to 56 out of 527 tests, the majority of cases being mild to moderate. There was still no evidence of community spread. Only three ventilators had been used up to that date out of 37 owned by the government and 11 owned in the private sector and made available to the government. 150 ventilators were on order from various sources. An order of 20 ventilators paid for by a philanthropist had been seized by the US government. Five ventilators donated by Rihanna were expected to reach Barbados by the following week.

Also on 5 April, a team of 100 healthcare professionals arrived from Cuba offering support to local frontline medical teams and would start working at the Harrison Point facility upon its completion. The same day, the Queen of England addressed the Commonwealth in a televised broadcast, in which she asked people to "take comfort that while we may have more still to endure, better days will return." She added, "we will be with our friends again; we will be with our families again; we will meet again."

On 7 April 2020, it was announced that on the following three days, supermarkets would reopen from 9:00 am to 4:00 pm to take orders online or over the phone for curbside pickup or delivery, though customers would not be allowed to enter the supermarket.

On 8 April, the Harrison Point facility was handed over to the Queen Elizabeth Hospital to be outfitted with furniture and equipment. The construction work which had finished the previous day had taken just under five weeks.

On 11 April 2020, Prime Minister Mia Mottley announced that the 24-hour curfew would be extended to end at midnight on the night of 3 May, instead of 14 April. Schools would no longer be able to reopen on 14 April, so e-learning and distance learning options would be explored, while common entrance and CXC exams would be postponed. She reminded the population that there was no shortage of food supplies in the country and announced a new surname-based schedule which food suppliers and banks would start using.

On 18 April 2020, 23 days after the declaration of the public health emergency and 15 days after the start of the 24-hour curfew, Barbados achieved three consecutive days with no new confirmed cases. By that date there had been 1,000 tests performed, resulting in 75 confirmed cases (38 female, 37 male) ranging from ages 7 to 95. There were 17 recoveries and 5 deaths (1 female, 4 male) with 53 cases still active. The next day, the Harrison Point facility received its first patients and patients were to continue being transferred there from the Enmore facility and the Blackman and Gollop facility over the following days.

On 20 April 2020, Acting Prime Minister Santia Bradshaw announced that while the curfew would remain in effect, some measures would be put in place to ease its restrictions, including: longer opening hours for supermarkets and mini marts; computer stores being allowed to open for deliveries and curbside pickups; and gas stations no longer falling under the alphabetic shopping schedule. Additionally, members of the public who should have allowed to shop on public holidays would be allowed to shop at other assigned times(National Heroes Day and May Day fall during the curfew period). Minister of Health and Wellness Jeffrey Bostic announced that scope of testing would be widened, and that only one ventilator was being used at that time.

On 24 April 2020, the Parliament of Barbados extended the state of emergency to 30 June. The curfew's end date, 3 May, was not adjusted.

On 30 April 2020, the prime minister announced that from 4 May the 24-hour curfew would revert to an overnight curfew, in effect from 8:00 pm to 5:00 am. Some low-risk business would be allowed to reopen, the sale of alcohol would no longer be prohibited, and beaches would be open from 6:00 am to 9:00 am.

=== January 2022 ===
On January 29, the country's Chief Medical Officer, Dr. Kenneth George, reported that Barbados's was in weeks four to five of Omicron surge cases and that day there were 630 new positive cases, over 150 individuals in isolation, and 12 people would be released from isolation. He also stated, "Effective immediately, the quarantine period for persons is no longer five days. Quarantine is for three days and you retest on the fourth day. This was instituted based on the epidemiology and the science of transmission of Omicron."

=== April 2022 ===
According to the U.S. Embassy to Barbados, Antigua and Barbuda, Dominica, Grenada, Saint Kitts and Nevis, Saint Lucia, and Saint Vincent and the Grenadines. Barbados is now currently under a Level 1 Travel Advisory. There are no COVID-related entry requirements for U.S. citizens.

=== Present-day ===
There are around 2,000 people affected with COVID-19 currently in Barbados.

Cases

Deaths

== Response ==
Since shortly after the first confirmed case, daily updates have been given to the public by various members of government and medical community including: Prime Minister, Mia Mottley; Acting Prime Minister and Minister of Education, Santia Bradshaw; Minister of Health and Wellness, Lt Col Jeffrey Bostic; Acting Chief Medical Officer, Dr. Anton Best; Head of Infectious Diseases at the Queen Elizabeth Hospital, Dr Corey Forde; COVID-19 Czar, Richard Carter.

The government has encouraged social distancing, suggesting that people practise physical distancing of six feet, limiting the size of gatherings (initially to 100, then 25, and eventually to three) and strongly recommending wearing cloth masks in public.

Regarding external funding, the European Investment Bank is collaborating with the national government to fund $60 million in emergency healthcare spending connected to COVID-19. The Bank's loan will assist the public health system, specifically its COVID-19 treatment capacity and vaccine roll-out and storage.

=== Stages ===
A COVID-19 hotline was set up (536-4500) and four stages were defined:

- Stage 0: no cases. During this stage preparations would be made in anticipation of the virus' arrival.
- Stage 1: a confirmed case. Stage 1 was entered on 17 March when the first two confirmed cases were announced.
- Stage 2: limited human-to-human spread. Stage 2 was entered on 21 March when the 14th confirmed case was announced.
- Stage 3: extensive human-to-human spread. Stage 3 was entered on 26 March when the 24th confirmed case was announced.

=== Facilities ===
The government has set up four locations to be used for quarantine and/or isolation:

- Barbados Defence Force's Paragon Base, Christ Church
- Enmore, Collymore Rock, St. Michael
- Blackman and Gollop Primary School, Staple Grove, Christ Church
- Harrison Point, St Lucy - The facility has a capacity for over 200 beds and received its first patients on 19 April.

A team of 100 intensive care specialists from Cuba will be used to boost the healthcare system, with a number of them being stationed at Harrison Point.

=== Testing ===
In February, the Best-dos Santos Public Health Laboratory became one of the first labs in the Caribbean to be ready for COVID-19 testing, having received training on 10 and 11 February on the PCR protocol as well as test kits and reagents in collaboration with the Pan American Health Organization (PAHO) and the Ministry of Health and Wellness. The first test is said to have been performed on 11 February.

In addition to 50,000 test kits said to be on order through PAHO, on 11 April the government announced the purchase of 20,000 kits at cost from the Cayman Islands. As of that date the country reported 747 tests, including retests of recovered COVID patients.

On 20 April, Minister of Health and Wellness Jeffrey Bostic announced that scope of testing would be widened as the government was in possession of 27,000 testing kits and 2,800 swaps. By that date, 1,063 tests had been performed over 68 days (75 positive). During the following 6 days 600 additional tests were performed taking the count to 1,663 completed tests (79 positive).

=== Public health emergency and curfew ===
On 26 March 2020, Prime Minister Mia Mottley announced that the country reached 24 cases and would be entering stage three of the COVID-19 National Preparedness Plan. As such, a public health emergency was declared and a curfew was set to start from 28 March at 8:00 pm.

Initially, the curfew only applied fully from 8:00 pm to 6:00 am with a request for limited movement during the day and was to end on 14 April. However, due to people still congregating in large groups it was changed to a 24-hour curfew on 3 April at 8:00 pm from which time all businesses with very few exceptions would be closed, including supermarkets and government offices, and the sale of alcohol would be prohibited. People would only be allowed to leave home for medical reasons or if they were considered to be part of or supporting essential services. On 11 April 2020 the curfew was further extended to end at midnight on the night of 3 May.

On 24 April 2020, the Parliament of Barbados extended the state of emergency from its original end date of 27 April (30 days after it started) to 30 June based on the expectation that the country would still be dealing with the effects of the virus past 27 April. It would also allow enforcement of the curfew to its current end-date, 3 May. The curfew itself was not adjusted.

== Impact ==
Restrictions have been placed on visitations at medical facilities and senior citizens homes, while visitations at quarantine centres, isolation centres and prisons have been prohibited.

2020's Crop Over and National Independence Festival of Creative Arts (NIFCA) were both cancelled.

=== Deaths ===
As of 30 April there have been 7 covid-related deaths recorded in Barbados, the first being announced on 5 April. There were 2 females, ages 57 and 78, and 5 males ranging in age from 52 to 95. Most were announced to have comorbidities, generally either diabetes or an unspecified underlying medical condition. At least one was not a Barbadian, but from another CARICOM nation.

=== Economy ===
All non-essential businesses including restaurants have been closed. With the start of the 24-hour curfew on 3 April, most business were closed, including supermarkets. Restrictions on some businesses eased over time, with supermarkets being able to open for deliveries and curbside pickups from 8 April, though customers were still not allowed to enter the supermarket. Some supermarkets offered pre-packaged bundles with items of their choosing at BBD $25, $50, $100 or $150. Village shops and mini-marts were also able to take orders and offer pre-packaged bundles. On 15 April, after reminding the population that there was no shortage of food supplies in the country, the Prime Minister announced that while curbside pickups and deliveries would continue, fruit and vegetable vendors would be able to resume operation, and supermarkets, fish markets, hardware stores, and banks would also be implementing a new approach where customers would be allowed to do business on property on specific days and times of the week based on the first letter of their surname. The schedule would also allot special times for healthcare and other essential workers, senior citizens and disabled people. On 20 April 2020, supermarkets and mini marts were allowed to open longer, computer stores were allowed to open for deliveries and curbside pickups, and gas stations no longer fell under the alphabetic shopping schedule.

Surname-Based Scheduling System
Monday	Tuesday	Wednesday	Thursday	Friday	Saturday	Sunday
Shopping Schedule
8:00 am – 11:00 am	8:00 am – 11:00 am	8:00 am – 11:00 am	8:00 am – 11:00 am	8:00 am – 11:00 am	8:00 am – 11:00 am	9:00 am – 11:00 am
A, B	Seniors and Disabled	C, D, E, F	G, H, I, J, K	L, M, N, O, P, Q, R	S, T, U, V, W, X, Y, Z	Seniors and Disabled
1:00 pm – 4:00 pm	1:00 pm – 4:00 pm	1:00 pm – 4:00 pm	1:00 pm – 4:00 pm	1:00 pm – 4:00 pm	1:00 pm – 4:00 pm	11:00 am – 2:00 pm
G, H, I, J, K	L, M, N, O, P, Q, R	S, T, U, V, W, X, Y, Z	Essential Workers	A, B	C, D, E, F	Essential Workers
Banking Schedule
9:00 am – 1:00 pm	9:00 am – 1:00 pm	9:00 am – 1:00 pm	9:00 am – 1:00 pm	9:00 am – 1:00 pm		
A, B	Seniors and Disabled	C, D, E, F	G, H, I, J, K	L, M, N, O, P, Q, R		
		1:00 pm – 4:00 pm	1:00 pm – 4:00 pm			
		S, T, U, V, W, X, Y, Z	Essential Workers			

Companies which support essential services are able to apply for an exception from the Attorney General to be able to operate. NIS would create a system with additional workers for managing the increased number of people filing for unemployment benefits.

As the result of over 14,000 unemployment benefit applications being filed, NIS created a separate system with additional workers for managing unemployment benefits with the goal of having the first cheques available within 10 days. The cheques would cover four weeks instead of one.

=== Education ===
All schools have been closed and though they were initially expected to reopen on 14 April, the extension of the curfew to 3 May prevented that. Some schools may look into the possibility of e-learning and distance learning as an alternative. National and regional exams such as common entrance and CXC have been postponed.

=== Travel ===
The country's borders have not closed to commercial airline traffic though there are very few passenger flights still operating and some arriving passengers will be subject to a 14-day quarantine.

== See also ==
- Caribbean Public Health Agency
- COVID-19 pandemic in Grenada
- COVID-19 pandemic in North America
- COVID-19 pandemic by country and territory
