= List of hospitals in Barbados =

This is a list of hospitals in Barbados.

- Bayview Hospital - Bayville, Saint Michael
- Queen Elizabeth Hospital (QEH) - Bridgetown
- The Sparman Clinic - Belleville, Saint Michael
- The Premiere Surgical Centre- Belleville, Saint Michael

== See also ==
- List of medical schools in the Caribbean
