= Ministry of Health and Wellness (Barbados) =

Government ministry of Barbados

The Ministry of Health & Wellness is a ministry of the Government of Barbados. Its stated aim is to promote and manage health and ensure environmental concerns are considered in all aspects of national development.

The minister is unknown.

The ministry runs the Barbados Psychiatric Hospital, the Barbados Drug Service, the Children's Development Centre and the National Nutrition Centre.

It launched a Dental Health Promotion Project for Secondary School Students in November 2018 with support from the Massy Foundation which donated just under BDS$23 000 for a dental health education programme.

It is considering setting up an international nursing school on the island.
