= Supreme Court of Judicature (Barbados) =

The Supreme Court of Judicature of Barbados (SCJ)
- Barbados Court of Arms
- Established: 1982
- Jurisdiction: Barbados
- Location: Supreme Court of Barbados Complex; Whitepark Road, St. Michael
- Appeals to: Caribbean Court of Justice (CCJ)
- Website: http://www.lawcourts.gov.bb/

Chief Justice and President
- Currently: Sir Patterson Cheltenham

The Supreme Court of Judicature of Barbados is the highest judicial body in the country of Barbados. It is made up of the High Court and the Court of Appeals.

Appeals from the Supreme Court can be further referred to the jurisdiction of the Caribbean Court of Justice (CCJ).

== Functions ==
The High Court consists of Civil, Criminal, and Family branches.

The Court of Appeals handles appeals from the High Court and the magistrates' courts, and hears appeals in both the civil and criminal branches of law. It may consist of a single Justice of Appeal sitting in chambers, or as a full court of three Justices of Appeal.

=== Composition ===
Justices of Appeal:

- The Hon. Chief Justice and President Sir Marston Gibson
- The Hon. Madam. Justice Sandra Mason
- The Hon. Mr.Justice Andrew Burgess
- The Hon. Madam Justice Kaye Goodridge

Judges of the High Court:

- The Hon. Mr. Justice William Chandler
- The Hon. Madam Justice Margaret Reifer
- The Hon. Mr. Justice Randall Worrell
- The Hon. Madam Justice Jacqueline Cornelius
- Dr. The Hon. Madam Justice Sonia Richards
- Dr. The Hon. Justice Olson Alleyne
- The Hon. Madam Justice Michelle Weekes
- The Hon. Madam Justice Pamela Beckles

== Appointment of justices ==
Justices are appointed by the Service Commissions for the Judicial and Legal Services.

== Building ==
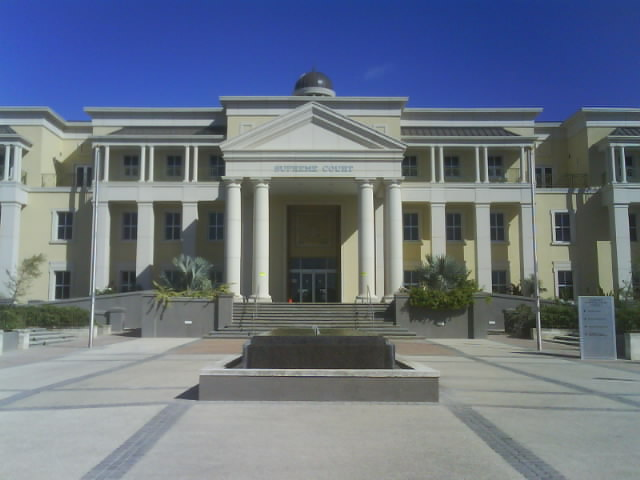
The Supreme Court of Barbados

The Supreme Court is located in a five-storey reinforced concrete structure of 183,000 square feet (17,000 m^{2}) which includes both civil and criminal courts, together with office accommodation and facilities for judges, juries, attorneys, prisoners, and the public, as well as the Registry and Records offices.

== Caribbean Court of Justice ==
The Caribbean Court of Justice (CCJ), (based in Port Of Spain, Trinidad and Tobago), is the court of last resort (final jurisdiction) for Barbados. It replaced the London-based Judicial Committee of the Privy Council (JCPC) in 2003, upon the passage of both the Caribbean Court of Justice Act and the Constitution (Amendment) Act by the Parliament of Barbados. These acts were brought into force by Proclamation on April 8, 2005; allowing the CCJ to supersede the Privy Council as the court of final Appellate Jurisdiction. The CCJ is also entrusted with the power to resolve disputes dealing with the Caribbean (CARICOM) Single Market and Economy (CSME).

== Judicial Oath ==
I, _________________________, do swear that I will well and truly serve Barbados in the office of the Chief Justice/Justice of Appeal/Judge of the High Court and I will do right to all manner of people after the laws and usages of Barbados without fear or favour, affection or ill will. So help me God.

== See also ==
- Chief Justice of Barbados

=== Further reading ===
- Staff writer (6 October 2009). "Colonial past ends with opening of new Supreme Court". Barbados Advocate. Archived from the original on 26 February 2012.
- Staff writer (6 October 2009). "Chief Justice to seek support for judicial reforms". Barbados Advocate. Archived from the original on 26 February 2012.
- Staff writer (6 October 2009). "Lawsuits made simple". Barbados Advocate. Archived from the original on 26 February 2012.
- Staff writer (30 September 2009). "Legal year to open on Monday". Barbados Advocate. Archived from the original on 26 February 2012.
- Staff writer (12 September 2009). "No word yet on future of current courts". Barbados Advocate. Archived from the original on 26 February 2012.
- Staff writer (30 June 2009). "Attorneys admitted to Inner Bar". Barbados Advocate. Archived from the original on 26 February 2012.
