= Jeffrey Bostic =

President of Barbados since 2025

His Excellency the Most Honourable Jeffrey Bostic FB MVO
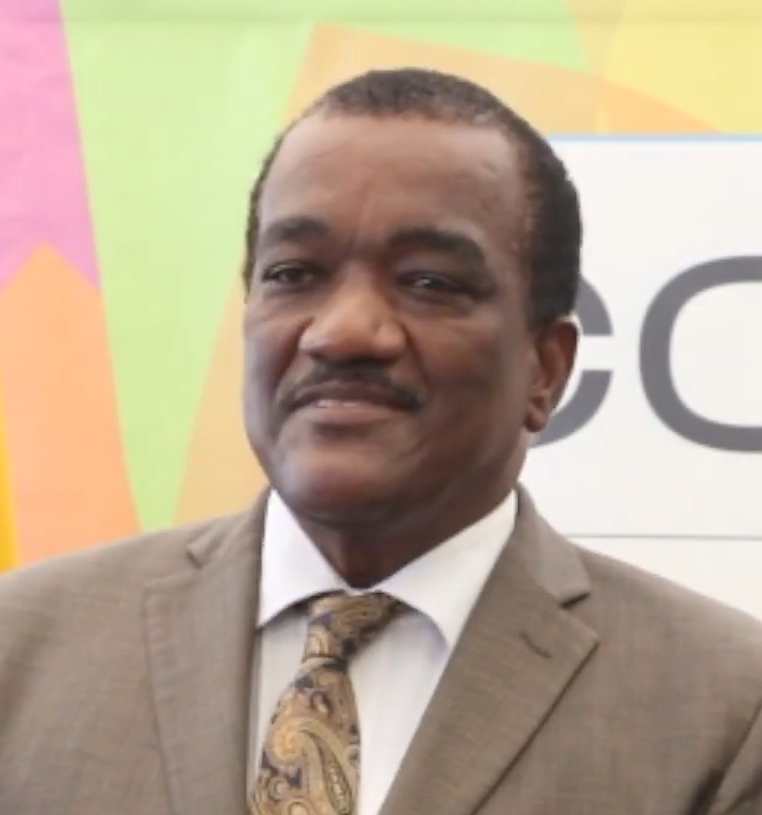
- Bostic in 2021

2nd President of Barbados
- Incumbent
- Assumed office 30 November 2025
- Prime Minister: Mia Mottley
- Preceded by: Sandra Mason

Minister of Health and Wellness
- In office 24 May 2018 – 18 January 2022
- Prime Minister: Mia Mottley
- Preceded by: John Boyce
- Succeeded by: Ian Gooding-Edghill

Member of the House of Assembly
- In office 21 February 2013 – 18 January 2022

Personal details
- Party: BLP
- Education: University of the West Indies (BA)
- Nickname: The Colonel

Military service
- Allegiance: Barbados
- Branch/service: Barbados Regiment
- Years of service: 1976–2006
- Rank: Lieutenant colonel

Jeffrey Davidson Bostic is a Barbadian politician and former army officer who has served as the first male president of Barbados since 2025. He was a cabinet minister in the cabinet of Mia Mottley. Bostic was the Minister of Health and Wellness of Barbados and a Member of the House of Assembly of Barbados. On 7 October 2025, Bostic was elected by the Parliament of Barbados to become the country's second president and first male president, taking office on 30 November 2025.

== Early life and career ==
=== Military career ===
Bostic served in several positions in the Barbados Defence Force. In 1989, during his time in the military, Bostic served as equerry to Queen Elizabeth II during her last visit to Barbados. He also worked with Governor-General Sir Hugh Springer as an aide de camp. In 2006, he had retired as a Commanding Officer of the Barbados Regiment and Director of Operations at the RSS from the Barbados Defence Force after serving over 30 years in the army.

=== Political career ===
Bostic was first elected to the Barbados House of Assembly in 2013, after successfully securing the majority vote in the 2013 Barbadian general election. He was re-elected in 2018 and was subsequently appointed Minister of Health.

He resigned as Minister of Health on 18 January 2022 after serving for almost four years.

== President of Barbados (2025–present) ==
Bostic was nominated jointly, by the Prime Minister Mia Mottley and Leader of the Opposition Ralph Thorne on 16 September 2025, to be the second President of Barbados.

Given there were no objections at the joint sitting of Parliament, Bostic was declared elected without a vote on 7 October 2025. Bostic was sworn in on 30 November, the 59th anniversary of Barbadian independence, succeeding Dame Sandra Mason.

== Honours ==
In 1989, Bostic was made a Member of the Royal Victorian Order (MVO) for services as an equerry to Queen Elizabeth II.

In 2022, Bostic was conferred the Order of Freedom of Barbados (FB).
