= Queen Elizabeth Hospital, Bridgetown =

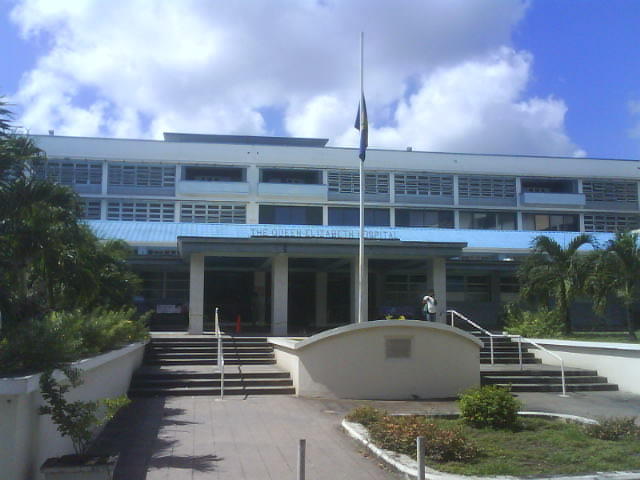
- Front entrance

Geography
- Location: Bridgetown, Saint Michael, Barbados
- Coordinates: 13°05′41″N 59°36′24″W

History
- Opened: 14 November 1964

The Queen Elizabeth Hospital (QEH) is located in Barbados' capital city Bridgetown, which is located in the parish of Saint Michael. The hospital is the main General Hospital for the southern part of the island. PAHO has rated the facility as a Category B hospital facility.

The QEH is a 519-bed complex lying in the Eastern section of Bridgetown, located on the southeast bank of the Constitution River. The current hospital building was constructed in 1963–1964, and officially opened on 14 November 1964.

The hospital can perform most surgeries, and specialized care includes the areas of: gynaecology, paediatrics, obstetrics, cardiac surgery, plastic surgery, psychotherapy, radiology, radiography and ophthalmology.

The Accident and Emergency Department, formerly known as QEH Casualty, was transformed in 1990 into the new A&E Department. The department was pioneered by Dr Irvine Brancker and Dr Van Tyne. It opened with a team of initially 12 junior doctors and 2 consultants. Presently, there are 20 doctors in the department. As the busiest department in the hospital, they attend to approximately 45,000 patients each year.

In 2006 it was stated that the Government of Barbados was spending $112 million (US$56 million) annually running the hospital.

In 2008, the former Minister of Health Jerome Walcott said that the current hospital which is over 40 years old should be replaced by a new state of the art hospital complex. He classified it as nonsensical to spend over $400 million (US$200 million) on an extension of the current facility saying that it may cost upwards of $600 million (US$300 million) in the end. He went on to suggest the current QEH might be better off turned into a nursing home. Later in 2011 the government's Donville Inniss gave the figure of around $800 million to build a new Hospital for Barbados. It was stated the government will need to review several factors including cost(s) and possible locations.

In 2024, former Minister of Health Sonia Browne echoed earlier comments by Walcott, calling for Barbados to build a new hospital and renovate QEH into a nursing home.

== See also ==
- Saint Joseph Hospital
