= Sandra Mason =

President of Barbados from 2021 to 2025

The Most Honourable Dame Sandra Mason FB GCMG DA SC
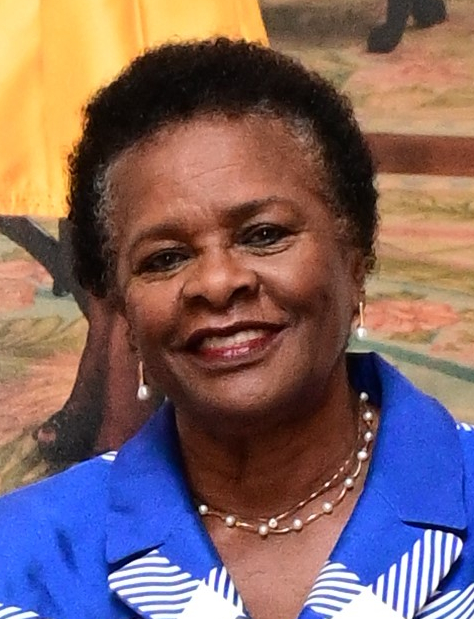
- Mason in 2024

1st President of Barbados
- In office 30 November 2021 – 30 November 2025
- Prime Minister: Mia Mottley
- Preceded by: Office established Elizabeth II (as Queen)
- Succeeded by: Jeffrey Bostic

8th Governor-General of Barbados
- In office 8 January 2018 – 30 November 2021
- Monarch: Elizabeth II
- Prime Minister: Freundel Stuart; Mia Mottley
- Preceded by: Philip Greaves (acting)
- Succeeded by: Office abolished

Personal details
- Born: Sandra Prunella Mason; 17 January 1949 (age 77) Saint Philip, Colony of Barbados
- Party: Independent
- Children: 1
- Education: University of the West Indies, Cave Hill (LLB); Hugh Wooding Law School (LEC)
- Occupation: Politician; lawyer; diplomat

Dame Sandra Prunella Mason FB GCMG DA SC (born 17 January 1949) is a Barbadian politician, lawyer, and diplomat who served as the first president of Barbados from 2021 to 2025. She was previously the eighth and final governor-general of Barbados from 2018 to 2021, the second woman to hold the office. On 20 October 2021, Mason was elected by the Parliament of Barbados to become the country's first president, and took office on 30 November 2021, when Barbados ceased to be a constitutional monarchy and became a republic.

Mason was a practising attorney-at-law who has served as a High Court judge in Saint Lucia and a Court of Appeal judge in Barbados, and was the first woman admitted to the bar in Barbados. She served as chair of the CARICOM commission to evaluate regional integration, was the first magistrate appointed an ambassador from Barbados, and was the first woman to serve on the country's Supreme Court. She was the first appointee from Barbados to the Commonwealth Secretariat Arbitral Tribunal. In 2017, she was appointed the 8th governor-general of Barbados, with a term beginning on 8 January 2018. Simultaneously with her appointment, Mason was awarded the Dame Grand Cross in the Order of Saint Michael and Saint George. On assumption of the office of Governor-General, she became the Chancellor of the Order of National Heroes, Order of Barbados and the Order of Freedom.

== Early life and education ==
Sandra Prunella Mason was born on 17 January 1949 in Saint Philip, Barbados. After studying at St. Catherine's Primary School until age nine, she attended secondary school at Queen's College, then began teaching at the Princess Margaret Secondary School in 1968. The following year, she worked at Barclays Bank as a clerk. Mason enrolled in the University of the West Indies at Cave Hill, where she earned a Bachelor of Laws. Mason was one of the first graduates of the Faculty of Law from UWI, Cave Hill, completing her education in 1973.

In 1975, she obtained a Legal Education Certificate from Hugh Wooding Law School in Trinidad and Tobago, becoming the first woman attorney-at-law from Barbados to graduate from the school. She was admitted to the bar on 10 November the same year, becoming the first woman member of the Barbados Bar Association. She is a Soroptimist and Patron of SI Barbados.

== Early career and legal practice ==
Beginning in 1975, she worked in Trust Administration for Barclay's and transferred to several different posts within the Barclay's company until 1977.

In 1978, Mason began working as the Magistrate of the Juvenile and Family Court and simultaneously tutoring in family law at UWI. She stopped tutoring in 1983 and continued working as a magistrate. In 1988, Mason completed the Royal Institute of Public Administration in London's course on Judicial Administration. She served on the UN Committee on the Rights of the Child from its 1991 inception until 1999, holding the vice chair from 1993 to 1995 and chair from 1997 to 1999.

Between 1991 and 1992, Mason served as chair and was one of the two women appointed to the 13-member CARICOM commission charged with evaluating regional integration. She left the family court in 1992 to serve as an ambassador to Venezuela, and was the first woman magistrate from Barbados to serve in that position. Between 1993 and 1994 she also served as ambassador to Chile, Colombia and Brazil. Upon her return to Barbados in 1994, Mason was appointed Chief Magistrate for Barbados, and in 1997 became the Registrar of the Supreme Court.

In 2000, Mason completed studies on Alternative Dispute Resolution at the University of Windsor in Windsor, Ontario, Canada, and then completed a Fellowship with the Commonwealth Judicial Education Institute in Halifax, Nova Scotia, in 2001, as well as a course in Advanced Dispute Resolution at UWI. She continued to serve as Registrar of the Supreme Court until 2005, when she was appointed as Queen's Counsel to the Inner Bar of Barbados. In 2008, Mason was sworn in as an Appeals Judge becoming the first woman to serve on the Barbados Court of Appeals. For three days in 2012, she became the acting Governor-General of Barbados and the following year was the first Barbadian appointed to membership in the Commonwealth Secretariat Arbitral Tribunal (CSAT). The Tribunal operates among members of the Commonwealth of Nations to resolve issues concerning contract disputes. With that appointment, Loop News named her one of the 10 most powerful women in Barbados.

== Governor-General of Barbados ==
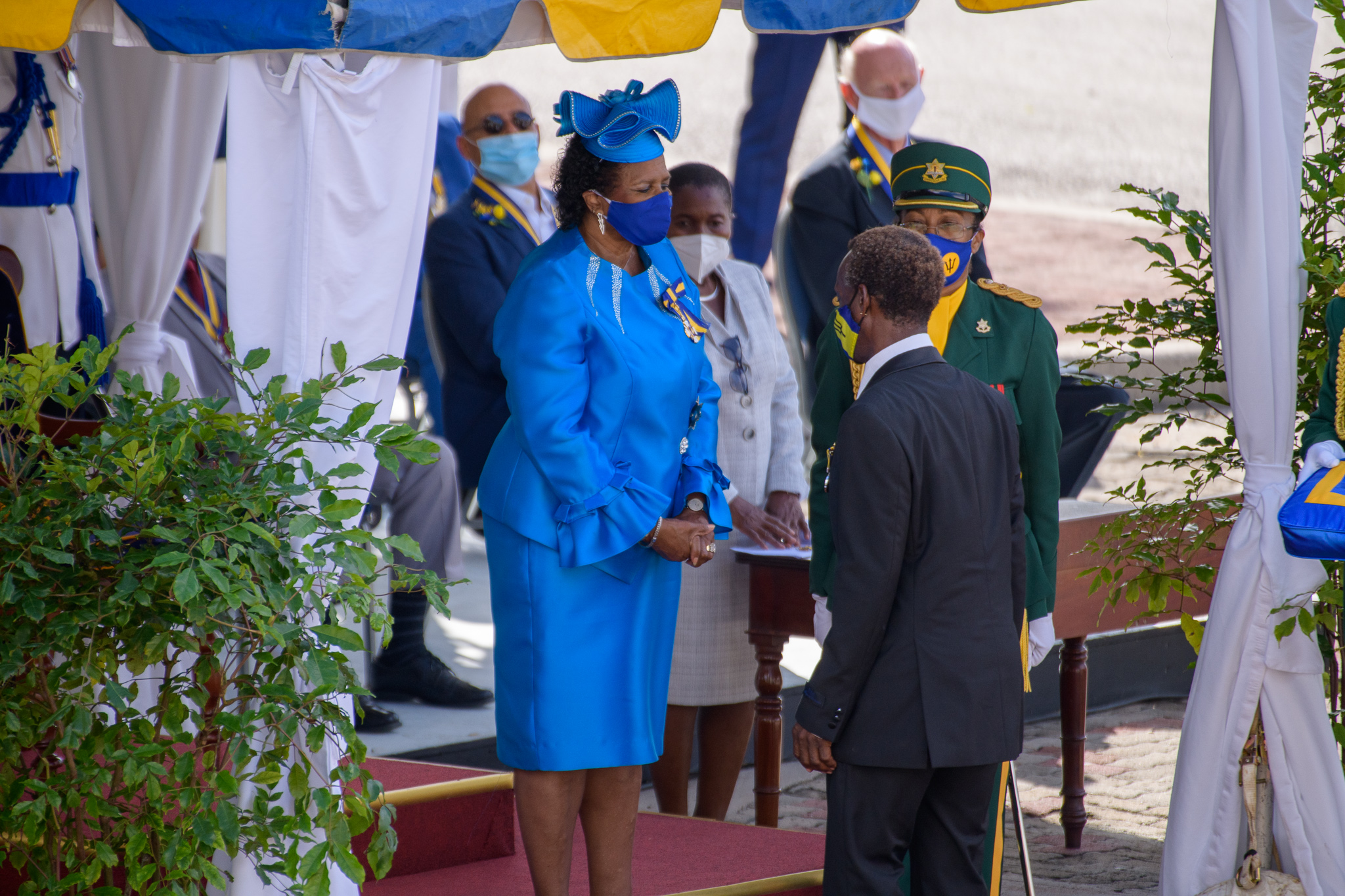
Mason presenting National Awards during the 2020 Independence Day parade

In 2017, Mason was appointed as the eighth Governor-General of Barbados, with a term beginning on 8 January 2018. Simultaneously with her appointment, Mason was also appointed a Dame Grand Cross in the Order of Saint Michael and Saint George.

In 2020, Mason, in her official capacity announcing government policy in the Throne Speech, written by the government of Prime Minister Mia Mottley, stated that Barbados would become a republic, abolishing the Barbadian monarchy. She was then expected to be nominated as a candidate to be the first president of Barbados, then to be elected by the two houses of parliament, and to assume office on 30 November 2021.

== President of Barbados ==
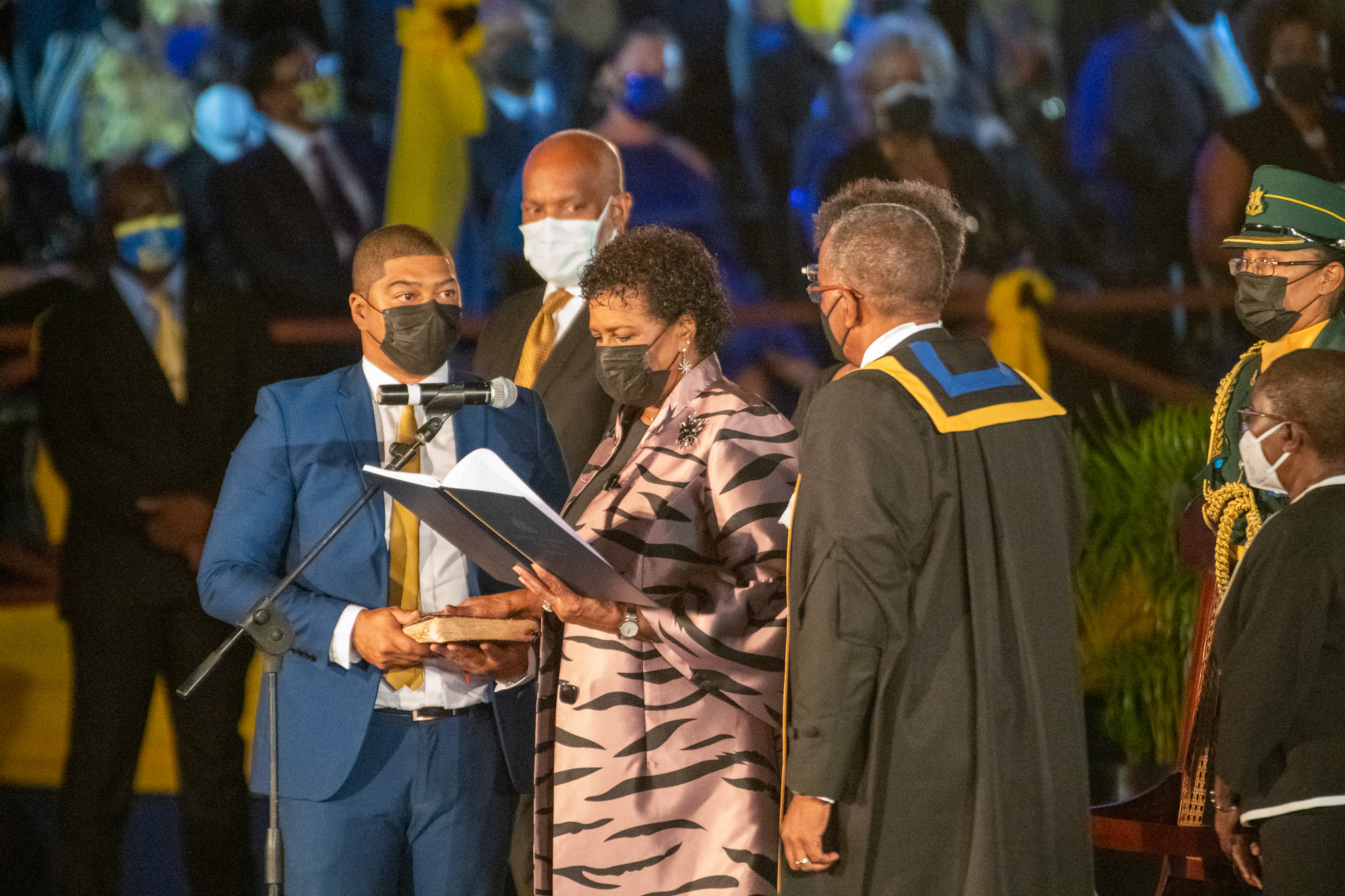
Mason taking oath as the first president of Barbados, 2021

On 12 October 2021, Mason was nominated by Prime Minister Mia Mottley and Opposition Leader Joseph Atherley to become the first president of Barbados. On 20 October she was elected by both houses without opposition. Mason took office on 30 November 2021, the 55th anniversary of Independence. While she is nominally chief executive and is the sole head of state in Barbados, in practice her role is mostly ceremonial, much like her previous role as Governor-General. She made her first official visit to Kenya in June 2022.

As president, Mason represented Barbados at the state funeral of Queen Elizabeth II in 2022, and at the coronation of King Charles III and Queen Camilla in 2023.

After the 2025 Barbadian presidential election, she was succeeded by Jeffrey Bostic, a former Lieutenant Colonel of the Barbados Defence Force.

== Honours ==
- Chancellor and Principal Dame of St. Andrew Order of Barbados (DA)
- Dame Grand Cross of the Order of St. Michael and St. George (GCMG)
- Dame of Grace of The Most Venerable Order of the Hospital of St. John (DStJ)
- Order of Freedom of Barbados (FB)

== Personal life ==
Mason has kept her family life largely private. She is known to have a son named Matthew, who is an attorney-at-law.

Government offices
Preceded by Sir Philip Greaves; Acting	Governor-General of Barbados; 2018–2021	Position abolished
Political offices
Preceded by Elizabeth II as Queen of Barbados	President of Barbados; 2021–2025	Succeeded by Jeffrey Bostic
