= History of Barbados =

Barbados is an island country in the southeastern Caribbean Sea, situated about 100 miles (160 km) east of Saint Vincent and the Grenadines. Roughly triangular in shape, the island measures some 21 miles (34 km) from northwest to southeast and about 14 miles (23 km) from east to west at its widest point. The capital and largest town is Bridgetown, which is also the main seaport.

Barbados was inhabited by Indigenous peoples – Arawaks and Kalinago – prior to the European colonisation of the Americas in the 16th century. The island was briefly claimed by the Spanish Empire who saw trees with a beard like feature (hence the name Barbados), and then by Portugal from 1532 to 1620. The island was an English and later a British colony from 1625 until 1966. Sugar cane cultivation in Barbados began in the 1640s, which saw the increasing importation of black slaves from West Africa. Several black slave codes were implemented in the late-17th century which resulted in several slave rebellion attempts, however none was successful. The Consolidated Slave Law was passed following the largest slave rebellion in Barbadian history, this was then followed by the total abolition of slavery in the British Empire in 1834. Britain continued to rule the island until independence was granted in 1966 and the state became a member of the Commonwealth of Nations.

From 1966 to 2021, Barbados was a constitutional monarchy and parliamentary democracy, modelled on the Westminster system, with Elizabeth II, Queen of Barbados, as head of state. Barbados became a republic on November 30, 2021, under Mia Mottley, thus removing the queen as its head of state.

== Before colonisation ==
Some evidence suggests that Barbados may have been settled in the second millennium BC, but this is limited to fragments of conch lip adzes found in association with shells that have been radiocarbon-dated to about 1630 BC.

Fully documented Amerindian settlement dates to between about 350 and 650 AD, when the Troumassoid people arrived. The arrivals were a group known as the Saladoid-Barrancoid from the mainland of South America.

The second wave of settlers appeared around 800 AD (the Spanish referred to these as "Arawaks") and a third in the mid-13th century. However, the Amerindian settlement surprisingly came to an end in the early 16th century. There's no evidence that the Kalinago (called "Caribs" by the Spanish) ever established a permanent settlement in Barbados, though they often visited the island in their canoes.

== Colonial history ==
=== Early colonial history ===
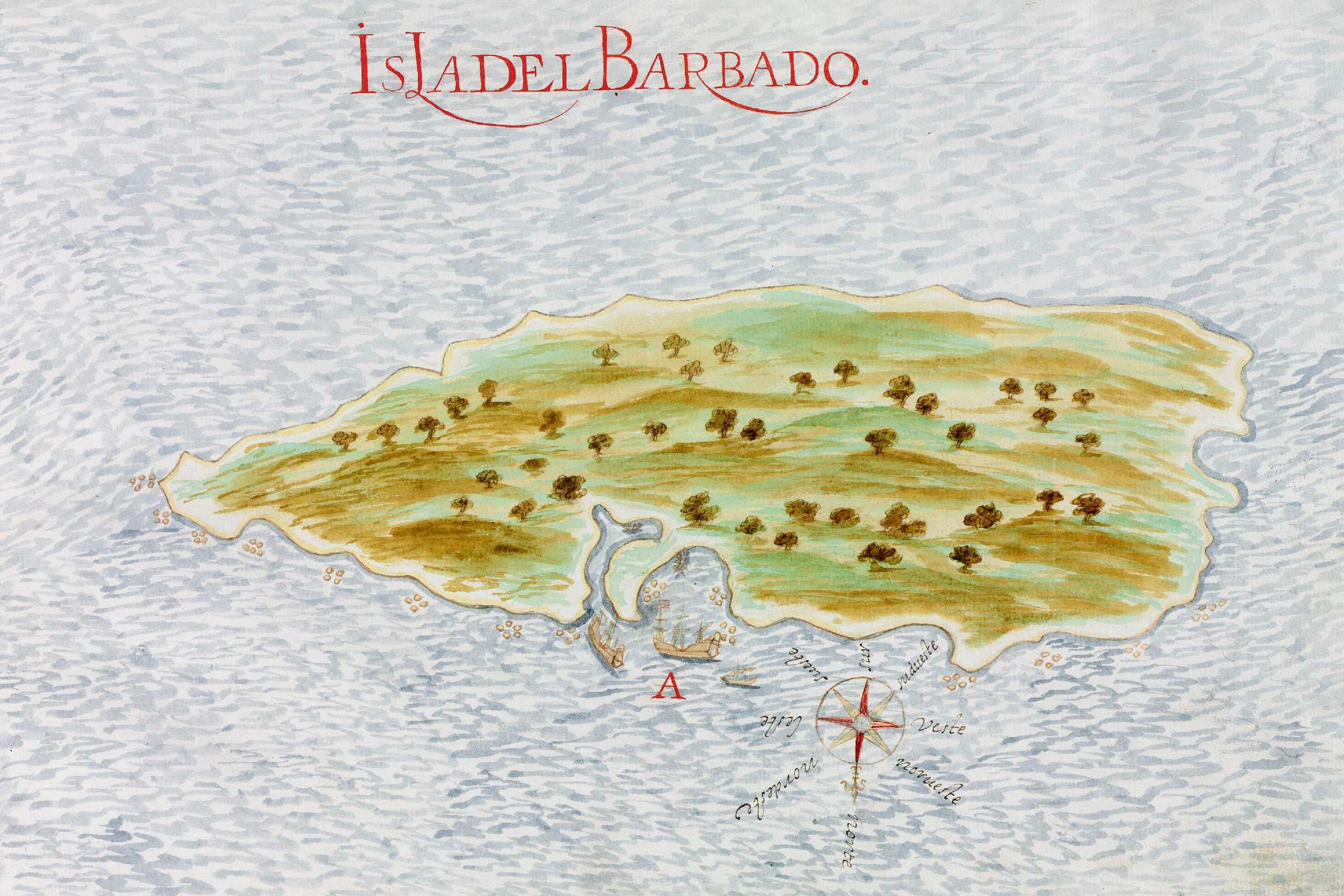
Spanish 1632 map of the "isla del Barbado" ("island of the Bearded Man")

The Portuguese were the first Europeans to discover the island. Portuguese navigator Pedro A. Campos named it Os Barbados (meaning "bearded ones").

Frequent slave-raiding missions by the Spanish Empire in the early 16th century led to a massive decline in the Amerindian population so that by 1541 a Spanish writer claimed they were uninhabited. The Amerindians were either captured for use as slaves by the Spanish or fled to other, more easily defensible mountainous islands nearby.

From about 1600 the English, French, and Dutch began to found colonies in the North American mainland and the smaller islands of the West Indies. Although Spanish and Portuguese sailors had visited Barbados, the first English ship touched the island on 14 May 1625, and England was the first European nation to establish a lasting settlement there from 1627, when the William and John arrived with more than 60 white settlers and six African enslaved people.

England is commonly said to have made its initial claim to Barbados in 1625, although reportedly an earlier claim may have been made in 1620. Nonetheless, Barbados was claimed from 1625 in the name of King James I of England and Scotland. There were earlier English settlements in The Americas (1607: Jamestown, 1609: Bermuda, and 1620: Plymouth Colony), and several islands in the Leeward Islands were claimed by the English at about the same time as Barbados (1623: St Kitts, 1628: Nevis, 1632: Montserrat, 1632: Antigua). Nevertheless, the Colony of Barbados quickly grew to become the third major English settlement in the Americas due to its prime eastern location.

=== Early English settlement ===
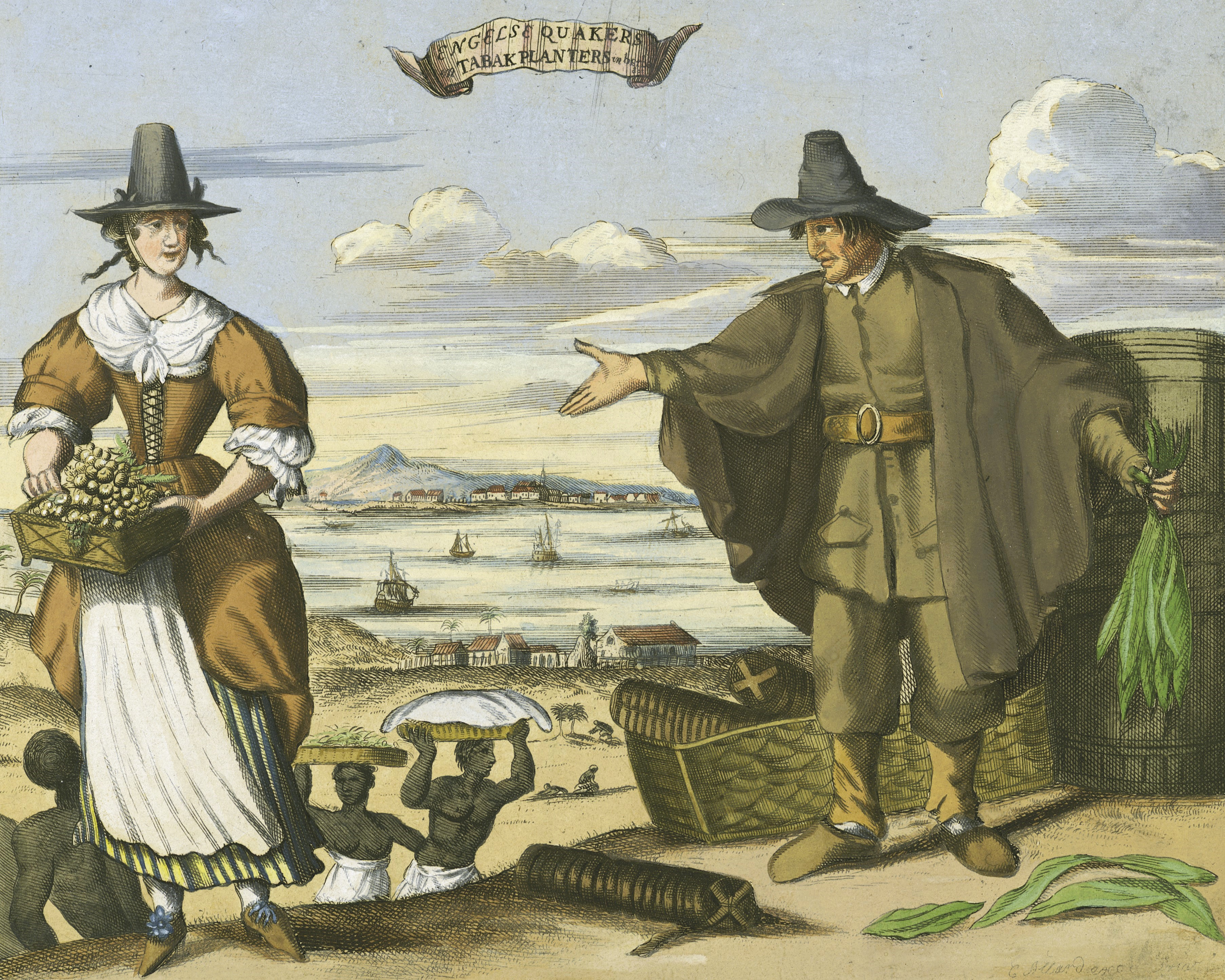
English quakers and tobacco slaves farmers in Barbados. Pieter vander Aa, Les Forces de l'Europe, Asie, Afrique et Amerique, 1726.

The settlement was established as a proprietary colony and funded by Sir William Courten, a City of London merchant who acquired the title to Barbados and several other islands. So the first colonists were actually tenants and much of the profits of their labour returned to Courten and his company.

The first English ship, which had arrived on 14 May 1625, was captained by John Powell. The first settlement began on 17 February 1627, near what is now Holetown (formerly Jamestown), by a group led by John Powell's younger brother, Henry, consisting of 80 settlers and 10 English labourers. The latter were young indentured labourers who according to some sources had been abducted, effectively making them slaves. About 40 Taino enslaved people were transported from Guyana to work planting crops on the west coast of the island.

Courten's title was transferred to James Hay, 1st Earl of Carlisle, in what was called the "Great Barbados Robbery." Carlisle established a separate settlement at what he called Carlisle Bay, which later became known as Bridgetown.

Carlisle then chose as governor Henry Hawley, who established the House of Assembly in 1639, in an effort to appease the planters, who might otherwise have opposed his controversial appointment. That year, 12 years after the settlement was established, the white adult population stood at an estimated 8,700.

In the period 1640–1660, the West Indies attracted over two-thirds of the total number of English emigrants to the Americas. By 1650, there were 44,000 settlers in the West Indies, as compared to 12,000 on the Chesapeake and 23,000 in New England.

Most English arrivals were indentured. After five years of labour, they were given "freedom dues" of about £10, usually in goods. Before the mid-1630s, they also received 5–10 acres of land, but after that time the island filled and there was no more free land. Around the time of Cromwell a number of rebels and criminals were also transported there.

Timothy Meads of Warwickshire was one of the rebels sent to Barbados at that time, before he received compensation for servitude of 1000 acres of land in North Carolina in 1666. Parish registers from the 1650s show, for the white population, four times as many deaths as marriages. The death rate was very high.

Before this, the mainstay of the infant colony's economy was the growing export of tobacco, but tobacco prices eventually fell in the 1630s, as Chesapeake production expanded.

=== England's civil war ===
Around the same time, fighting during the War of the Three Kingdoms and the Interregnum spilled over into Barbados and Barbadian territorial waters. The island was not involved in the war until after the execution of Charles I, when the island's government fell under the control of Royalists (ironically the Governor, Philip Bell, remained loyal to Parliament while the Barbadian House of Assembly of Barbados, under the influence of Humphrey Walrond, supported Charles II). On 7 May 1650, the General Assembly of Barbados voted to receive Lord Willoughby as governor, a move which confirmed the Cavaliers as the government of Barbados.

Willoughby rounded up and deported many Roundheads from Barbados, confiscating their property. To try to bring the recalcitrant colony to heel, the Commonwealth Parliament passed an act on 3 October 1650 prohibiting trade between England and Barbados, and because the island also traded with the Netherlands, further navigation acts were passed prohibiting any but English vessels trading with Dutch colonies. These acts were a precursor to the First Anglo-Dutch War.

The Commonwealth of England sent an invasion force under the command of Sir George Ayscue, which arrived in October 1651, and blockaded the island. After some skirmishing, the Royalists in the House of Assembly, feeling the pressures of commercial isolation, led by Lord Willoughby surrendered. The conditions of the surrender were incorporated into the Charter of Barbados (Treaty of Oistins), which was signed at the Mermaid's Inn, Oistins, on 17 January 1652.

=== Sugar cane and slavery ===
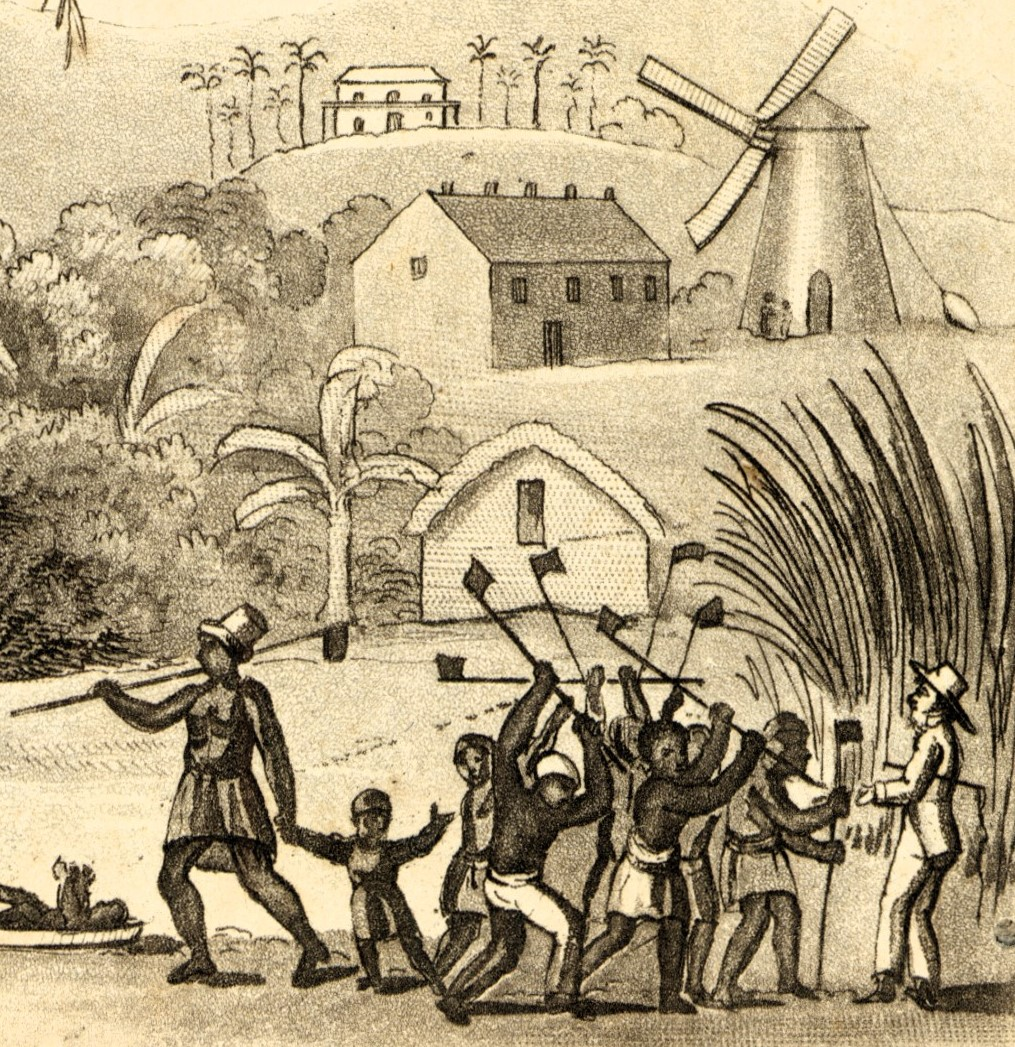
African Slaves working in a sugar plantation in Barbados, 1807-1808

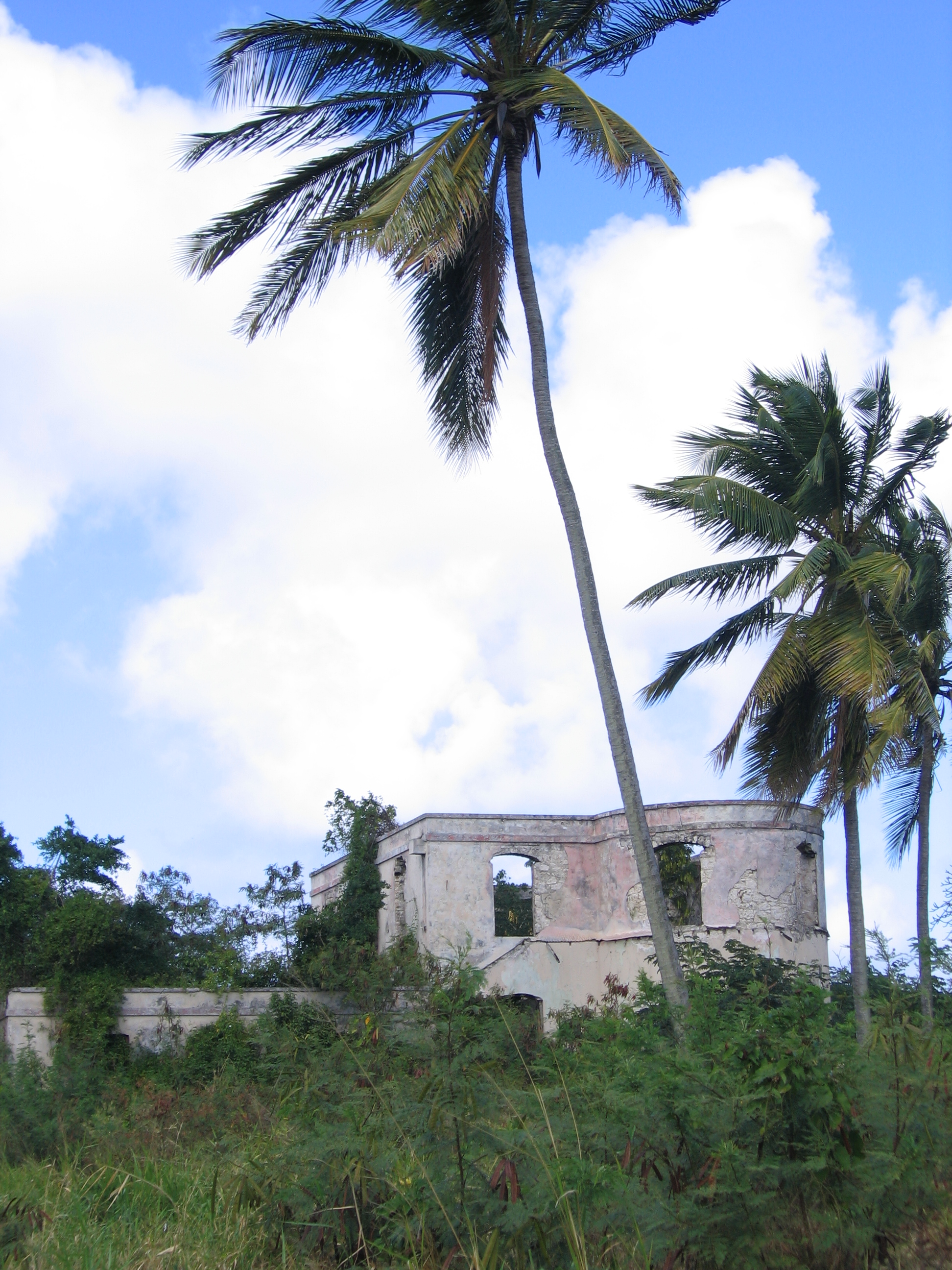
Ruins of a plantation in Saint Lucy, Barbados.

Sugar cane cultivation in Barbados began in the 1640s, after its introduction in 1637 by Pieter Blower. Initially, rum was produced but by 1642, sugar was the focus of the industry. As it developed into the main commercial enterprise, Barbados was divided into large plantation estates which replaced the small holdings of the early English settlers as the wealthy planters pushed out the poorer. Some of the displaced farmers relocated to the English colonies in North America, most notably South Carolina. To work the plantations, Africans – primarily from West Africa – were transported as slaves in such numbers that there were three for every one planter. Increasingly after 1750 the plantations were owned by absentee landlords living in Britain and operated by hired managers. Persecuted Catholics from Ireland also worked the plantations. Life expectancy of enslaved people was short and ‘replacements’ were purchased annually.

The introduction of sugar cane from Dutch Brazil in 1640 completely transformed society and the economy. Barbados eventually had one of the world's biggest sugar industries. One group instrumental in ensuring the early success of the industry were the Sephardic Jews, who had originally been expelled from the Iberian Peninsula, to end up in Dutch Brazil. As the effects of the new crop increased, so did the shift in the ethnic composition of Barbados and surrounding islands. The workable sugar plantation required a large investment and a great deal of heavy labour. At first, Dutch traders supplied the equipment, financing, and African slaves, in addition to transporting most of the sugar to Europe. Barbados replaced Hispaniola as the main sugar producer in the Caribbean.

In 1655, the population of Barbados was estimated at 43,000, of which about 20,000 were of African descent, with the remainder mainly of English descent. These English smallholders were eventually bought out and the island filled up with large African slave-worked sugar plantations. By 1660, there was near parity with 27,000 blacks and 26,000 whites. By 1666, at least 12,000 white smallholders had been bought out, died, or left the island. Many of the remaining whites were increasingly poor. By 1673, black slaves (33,184) outnumbered white settlers (21,309). By 1680, there were 17 slaves for every indentured servant. By 1684, the disparity grew even further to 19,568 white settlers and 46,502 enslaved Africans. By 1696, there was an estimated 42,000 enslaved Africans, and the white population declined further to 16,888 by 1715.

Due to the increased implementation of slave codes, which emphasised differential treatment between Africans, and the white workers and ruling planter class, the island became increasingly unattractive to poor whites. Black or slave codes were implemented in 1661, 1676, 1682, and 1688. In response to these codes, several slave rebellions were attempted or planned during this time, but none succeeded. Nevertheless, poor whites who had or acquired the means to emigrate often did so. Planters expanded their importation of African slaves to cultivate sugar cane. One early advocate of slave rights in Barbados was the visiting Quaker preacher Alice Curwen in 1677: "For I am persuaded, that if they whom thou call'st thy Slaves, be Upright-hearted to God, the Lord God Almighty will set them Free in a way that thou knowest not; for there is none set free but in Christ Jesus, for all other Freedom will prove but a Bondage."

By 1660, Barbados generated more trade than all the other English colonies combined. This remained so until it was eventually surpassed by geographically larger islands like Jamaica in 1713. But even so, the estimated value of the Colony of Barbados in 1730–1731 was as much as £5,500,000. Bridgetown, the capital, was one of the three largest cities in English America (the other two being Boston, Massachusetts, and Port Royal, Jamaica.) By 1700, the English West Indies produced 25,000 tons of sugar, compared to 20,000 for Brazil, 10,000 for the French islands and 4,000 for the Dutch islands. This quickly replaced tobacco, which had been the island's main export.

As the sugar industry developed into its main commercial enterprise, Barbados was divided into large plantation estates that replaced the smallholdings of the early English settlers. In 1680, over half the arable land was held by 175 large planters, each of whom used at least 60 slaves. The great plantation owners had connections with the English aristocracy and great influence on Parliament. (In 1668, the West Indian sugar crop sold for £180,000 after customs of £18,000. Chesapeake tobacco earned £50,000 after customs of £75,000).

So much land was devoted to sugar that most foods had to be imported from New England. The poorer whites who were moved off the island went to the English Leeward Islands, or especially to Jamaica. In 1670, the Province of South Carolina was founded, when some of the surplus population again left Barbados. Other nations receiving large numbers of Barbadians included British Guiana and Panama.

Justin Roberts shows that enslaved persons did not spend the majority of time in restricted roles cultivating, harvesting and processing sugar cane, the island's most important cash crop. Rather, the enslaved were involved in various activities and in multiple roles: raising livestock, fertilising soil, growing provisional crops, maintaining plantation infrastructure, caregiving and other tasks. One notable soil management technique was intercropping, planting subsistence crops between the rows of cash crops, which demanded of the enslaved skilled and experienced observations of growing conditions for efficient land use.

Slaveholders often counted as "married" only the enslaved with mates on the estate. For example, the manager of Newton estate... recorded 20 women with co-resident husbands and 35 with mates elsewhere. Members of the latter group were labelled single, members of extended units, or mother-child units. (Note: Estate, real estate and houses on it)

By 1750, there were about 18,000 white settlers, compared to approximately 65,000 African slaves.

The slave trade ceased in 1807 and slaves were emancipated in 1834.

Gypsies were also subjected to slavery. The British transported Gypsy slaves to Barbados as a means of removing them from Britain.

=== Bussa's rebellion ===
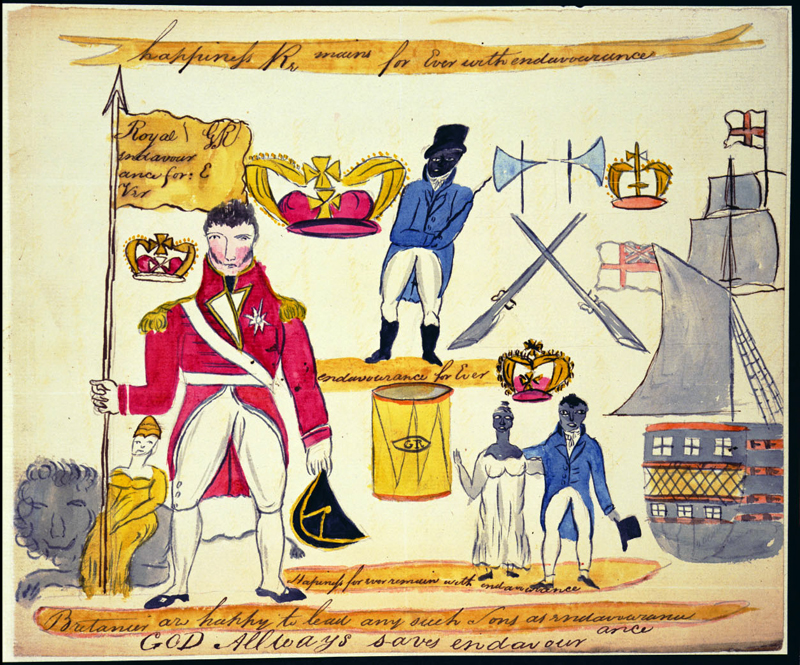
Sketch of a flag taken from rebels against slavery in Barbados, after the uprising known as Bussa's Rebellion (1816). The flag appears to stress the rebels' loyalty to Britain and to the Crown while conveying their earnest desire for liberty. British forces on Barbados suppressed the revolt and hundreds of the rebels were killed.

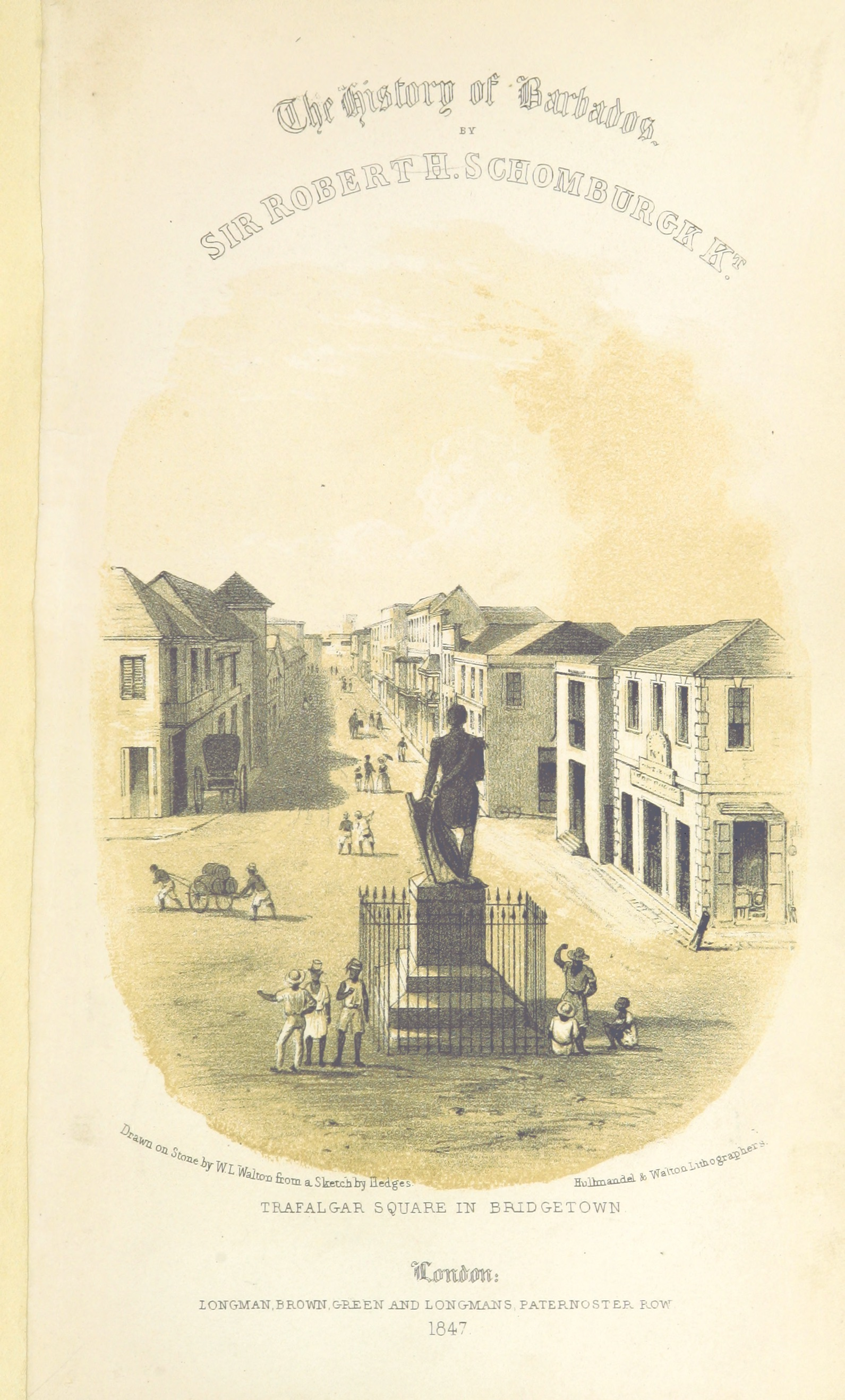
Bridgetown, Barbados in 1848

The British abolished the slave trade in 1807, but not the institution itself. The abolition of slavery itself would only be enacted in 1833 in most parts of the British Empire.

In 1816, enslaved persons rose up in what was the first of three rebellions in the British West Indies to occur in the interval between the end of the slave trade and emancipation, and the largest slave uprising in the island's history. Around 20,000 enslaved persons from over 70 plantations are thought to have been involved. The rebellion was partly fuelled by information about the growing abolitionist movement in England, and the opposition against such by local whites.

The rebellion largely surprised planters, who felt that their slaves were content because they were allowed weekly dances, participated in social and economic activity across the island and were generally fed and looked after. However, they had refused to reform the Barbados Slave Code since its inception, a code that denied slaves human rights and prescribed inhumane torture, mutilation or death as a means of control. This contributed to what was later termed "Bussa's Rebellion", named after the slave ranger Bussa, and the result of a growing sentiment that the treatment of slaves in Barbados was "intolerable", and who believed the political climate in Britain made the time ripe to peacefully negotiate with planters for freedom. Bussa became the most famous of the rebellion's organisers, many of whom were either enslaved persons of some higher position or literate freedmen. One woman, Nanny Grigg, is also named as a principal organiser.

However, the rebellion eventually failed. The uprising was triggered prematurely, but the slaves were already greatly outmatched. Barbados's flat terrain gave the horses of the better-armed militia the clear advantage over the rebels, with no mountains or forest for concealment. Slaves had also thought they would be supported by freed men of colour, but these instead joined efforts to quell the rebellion. Although they drove whites off the plantations, widespread killings did not take place. By the end, 120 slaves died in combat or were immediately executed and another 144 brought to trial and executed. The remaining rebels were shipped off the island.

=== Towards the abolition of slavery ===
In 1826, the Barbados legislature passed the Consolidated Slave Law, which simultaneously granted concessions to the slaves while providing reassurances to the slave owners.

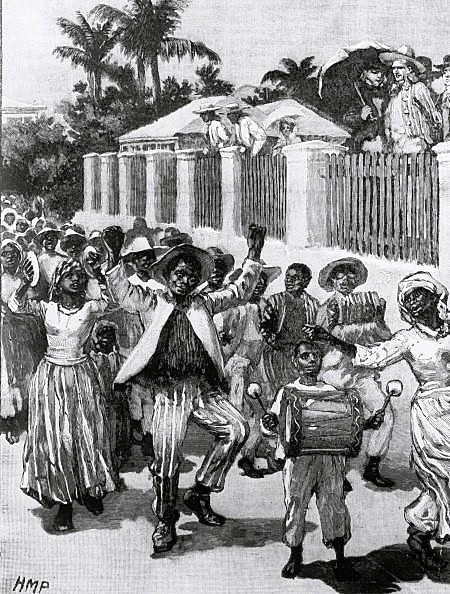
Slaves Barbados march through the streets to celebrate their emancipation

Slavery was finally abolished in the British Empire eight years later, in 1834. In Barbados and the rest of the British West Indian colonies, full emancipation from slavery was preceded by a contentious apprenticeship period that lasted four years.

Blue Ensign flag of the Colony of Barbados from 1870 to 1966.

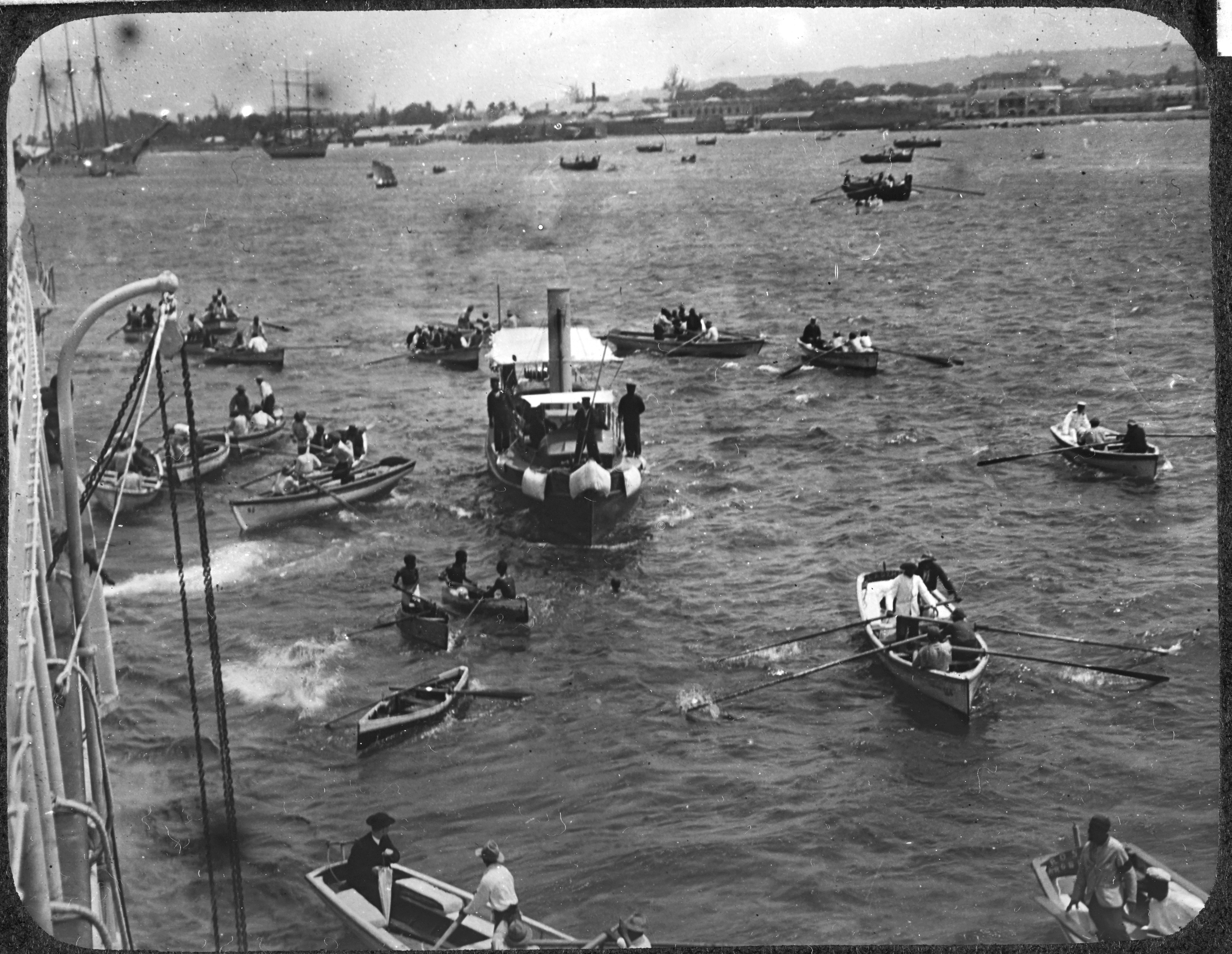
Bridgetown harbour in 1902

In 1884, the Barbados Agricultural Society sent a letter to Sir Francis Hincks requesting his private and public views on whether the Dominion of Canada would favourably entertain having the then Colony of Barbados admitted as a member of the Canadian Confederation. Asked from Canada were the terms of the Canadian side to initiate discussions, and whether or not the island of Barbados could depend on the full influence of Canada in getting the change agreed to by the British Parliament at Westminster.

=== Towards decolonisation ===
In 1952, the Barbados Advocate newspaper polled several prominent Barbadian politicians, lawyers, businessmen, the Speaker of the House of Assembly and later as first President of the Senate, Sir Theodore Branker, Q.C.and found them to be in favour of immediate federation of Barbados along with the rest of the British Caribbean with complete Dominion Status within five years from the date of inauguration of the West Indies Federation with Canada.

However, plantation owners and merchants of British descent still dominated local politics, owing to the high income qualification required for voting. More than 70 per cent of the population, many of them disenfranchised women, were excluded from the democratic process. It was not until the 1930s that the descendants of emancipated slaves began a movement for political rights. One of the leaders of this, Sir Grantley Adams, founded the Barbados Progressive League in 1938, which later became known as the Barbados Labour Party (BLP).

Adams and his party demanded more rights for the poor and for the people, and staunchly supported the monarchy. Progress toward a more democratic government in Barbados was made in 1942, when the exclusive income qualification was lowered and women were given the right to vote. By 1949, governmental control was wrested from the planters, and in 1953 Adams became Premier of Barbados.

From 1958 to 1962, Barbados was one of the ten members of the West Indies Federation, a federalist organisation doomed by nationalist attitudes. Grantley Adams served as its first and only "Premier", but his leadership failed in attempts to form similar unions, and his continued defence of the monarchy was used by his opponents as evidence that he was no longer in touch with the needs of his country. Errol Walton Barrow, a fervent reformer, became the people's new advocate. Barrow had left the BLP and formed the Democratic Labour Party (DLP) as a liberal alternative to Adams's conservative government. Barrow instituted many progressive social programmes, such as free education for all Barbadians and a school meals system. By 1961, Barrow had replaced Adams as Premier and the DLP controlled the government.

With the Federation dissolved, Barbados reverted to its former status, that of a self-governing colony. The island negotiated its own independence at a constitutional conference with Britain in June 1966. After years of peaceful and democratic progress, Barbados finally became an independent state on 30 November 1966, with Errol Barrow its first prime minister, with Elizabeth II as Queen of Barbados. Upon independence Barbados became a full member of the Commonwealth of Nations. A year later, Barbados's international linkages were expanded by obtaining membership of both the United Nations and the Organization of American States.

=== Political history ===
Carrington (1982) examines politics during the American Revolution, revealing that Barbadian political leaders shared many of the grievances and goals of the American revolutionaries, but that they were unwilling to go to war over them. Nevertheless, the repeated conflicts between the island assembly and the royal governors brought important constitutional reforms which confirmed the legislature's control over most local matters and its power over the executive.

From 1800 until 1885, Barbados then served as the main seat of Government for the former British colonies of the Windward Islands. During that period of around 85 years, the resident Governor of Barbados also served as the Colonial head of the Windward Islands. After the Government of Barbados officially exited from the Windward Island union in 1885, the seat was moved from Bridgetown to St. George's on the neighbouring island of Grenada, where it remained until the territory of the Windward Islands was dissolved.

Soon after Barbados's withdrawal from the Windward Islands, Barbados became aware that Tobago was going to be amalgamated with another territory as part of a single state. In response, Barbados made an official bid to the British Government to have neighbouring Island Tobago joined with Barbados in a political union. The British government however decided that Trinidad would be a better fit and Tobago instead was made a Ward of Trinidad.

African slaves worked on plantations owned by merchants of English and Scottish descent. It was these merchants who continued to dominate Barbados politics, even after emancipation, due to a high income restriction on voting. Only the upper 30 per cent had any voice in the democratic process. It was not until the 1930s that a movement for political rights was begun by the descendants of emancipated slaves, who started trade unions. Charles Duncan O'Neal, Clennell Wickham and the members of the Democratic League were some of the leaders of this movement. This was initially opposed by Sir Grantley Adams, who played an instrumental role in the bankruptcy and shutdown of The Herald newspapers, one of the movement's foremost voices. Adams would later found the Barbados Progressive League (now the Barbados Labour Party) in 1938, during the Great Depression. The Depression caused mass unemployment and strikes, and the standard of living on the island fell drastically. With the death of O’Neal and the demise of the League, Adams cemented his power, but he used this to advocate for causes that had once been his rivals, including more help for the people especially the poor.

Finally, in 1942, the income qualification was lowered. This was followed by the introduction of universal adult suffrage in 1951, and Adams was elected as Premier of Barbados in 1958. For his action and leadership, Adams would later become a National Hero.

From 1958 to 1962, Barbados was one of the ten members of the West Indies Federation, an organisation doomed to failure by a number of factors, including what were often petty nationalistic prejudices and limited legislative power. Indeed, Adams's position as "Prime Minister" was a misnomer, as all of the Federation members were still colonies of Britain. Adams, once a political visionary and now a man whose policies seemed to some blind to the needs of his country, not only held fast to his notion of defending the monarchy but also made additional attempts to form other Federation-like entities after that union's demise. When the Federation was terminated, Barbados reverted to its former status as a self-governing colony, but efforts were made by Adams to form another federation composed of Barbados and the Leeward and Windward Islands.

Errol Walton Barrow was to replace Grantley Adams as the advocate of populism, and it was he who eventually led the island into Independence in 1966. Barrow, a fervent reformer and once a member of the Barbados Labour Party, had left the party to form his own Democratic Labour Party, as the liberal alternative to the conservative BLP government under Adams. He remains a National Hero for his work in social reformation, including the institution of free education for all Barbadians. In 1961, Barrow supplanted Adams as Premier as the DLP took control of the government.

== Independence ==
Due to several years of growing autonomy, Barbados, with Barrow at the helm, was able successfully to negotiate its independence at a constitutional conference with the United Kingdom in June 1966. After years of peaceful and democratic progress, Barbados finally became an independent state and formally joined the Commonwealth of Nations on 30 November 1966, Errol Barrow serving as its first prime minister.

The Barrow government sought to diversify the economy away from agriculture, seeking to boost industry and the tourism sector. Barbados was also at the forefront of regional integration efforts, spearheading the creation of CARIFTA and CARICOM. The DLP lost the 1976 Barbadian general election to the BLP under Tom Adams. Adams adopted a more conservative and strongly pro-Western stance, allowing the Americans to use Barbados as the launchpad for their invasion of Grenada in 1983. Adams died in office in 1985 and was replaced by Harold Bernard St. John; however, St. John lost the 1986 Barbadian general election, which saw the return of the DLP under Errol Barrow, who had been highly critical of the US intervention in Grenada. Barrow, too, died in office, and was replaced by Lloyd Erskine Sandiford, who remained prime minister until 1994.

Owen Arthur of the BLP won the 1994 Barbadian general election, remaining prime minister until 2008. Arthur was a strong advocate of republicanism, though a planned referendum to replace Queen Elizabeth as Head of State in 2008 never took place. The DLP won the 2008 Barbadian general election, but the new Prime Minister David Thompson died in 2010 and was replaced by Freundel Stuart. The BLP returned to power in 2018 under Mia Mottley, who became Barbados's first female prime minister.

=== Transition to republic ===
The Government of Barbados announced on 15 September 2020 that it intended to become a republic by 30 November 2021, the 55th anniversary of its independence resulting in the replacement of the hereditary monarch of Barbados with an elected president. Barbados would then cease to be a Commonwealth realm, but could maintain membership in the Commonwealth of Nations, like Guyana and Trinidad and Tobago.

On 20 September 2021, just over a full year after the announcement for the transition was made, the Constitution (Amendment) (No. 2) Bill, 2021 was introduced to the Parliament of Barbados. Passed on 6 October, the Bill made amendments to the Constitution of Barbados, introducing the office of the President of Barbados to replace the role of Elizabeth II, Queen of Barbados. The following week, on 12 October 2021, incumbent Governor-General of Barbados Sandra Mason was jointly nominated by the Prime Minister and Leader of the Opposition as candidate to be the first President of Barbados, and was subsequently elected on 20 October. Mason took office on 30 November 2021. Prince Charles, who was heir apparent to the Barbadian Crown, attended the swearing-in ceremony in Bridgetown at the invitation of the Government of Barbados.

Queen Elizabeth II sent a message of congratulations to President Mason and the people of Barbados, saying: "As you celebrate this momentous day, I send you and all Barbadians my warmest good wishes for your happiness, peace and prosperity in the future."

A survey was taken between October 23, 2021, and November 10, 2021, by the University of the West Indies that showed 34% of respondents being in favour of transitioning to a republic, while 30% were indifferent. Notably, no overall majority was found in the survey; with 24% not indicating a preference, and the remaining 12% being opposed to the removal of Queen Elizabeth.

In January 2022, Barbados Prime Minister Mia Mottley's Labor Party received a landslide victory, winning all 30 legislative seats, in the first general election since Barbados became a republic.

On 20 June 2022, a Constitutional Review Commission was formed and sworn in by Jeffrey Gibson (who, at the time, was serving temporarily as Acting President of Barbados) to review the Constitution of Barbados. The Commission had an 18-month timeline to complete its work. They were expected to solicit input from members of the public in Barbados via a series of face-to-face and online events. Toward the end of 2024 Barbados released the final report of its Constitutional Reform Commission.

In February 2026, prime minister Mia Mottley won her third consecutive election victory by landslide, meaning her Barbados Labour party won again all the 30 seats in the House of Assembly.

== Confederations and union proposals ==
A number of proposals have been mooted in the past to integrate Barbados into neighbouring countries or even the Canadian Confederation. To date all have failed, and one proposal led to deadly riots in 1876, when Governor John Pope Hennessy tried to pressure Barbadian politicians to integrate more firmly into the Windward Islands. Governor Hennessy was quickly transferred from Barbados by the British Crown. In 1884, attempts were then made by the influential Barbados Agricultural Society to have Barbados form a political association with the Canadian Confederation. From 1958 to 1962 Barbados became one of the ten states of the West Indies Federation. Lastly in the 1990s, a plan was devised by the leaders of Guyana, Barbados, and Trinidad and Tobago to form a political association between those three governments. Again this deal was never completed, following the loss of Sir Lloyd Erskine Sandiford in the Barbadian general elections.

== See also ==
- Bussa's rebellion
- Military history of Barbados
- British colonization of the Americas
- French colonization of the Americas
- History of the Americas
- History of North America
- History of the British West Indies
- List of prime ministers of Barbados
- List of governors of Barbados
- Longitude
- Piracy in the Caribbean
- Politics of Barbados
- Spanish colonization of the Americas
- Timeline of Barbadian history
- West Indies Federation

== Additional sources ==
- Hoyes, F. A. 1963. The Rise of West Indian Democracy: The Life and Times of Sir Grantley Adams. Advocate Press.
- Williams, Eric. 1964. British Historians and the West Indies. P.N.M. Publishing Company, Port-of-Spain.
- Scott, Caroline. 1999. Insight Guide Barbados. Discovery Channel and Insight Guides; fourth edition, Singapore. ISBN 0-88729-033-7
