= 2026 Barbadian general election =

- 11 February 2026

All 30 seats in the House of Assembly 16 seats needed for a majority
- Registered: 271,205
- Turnout: 42%
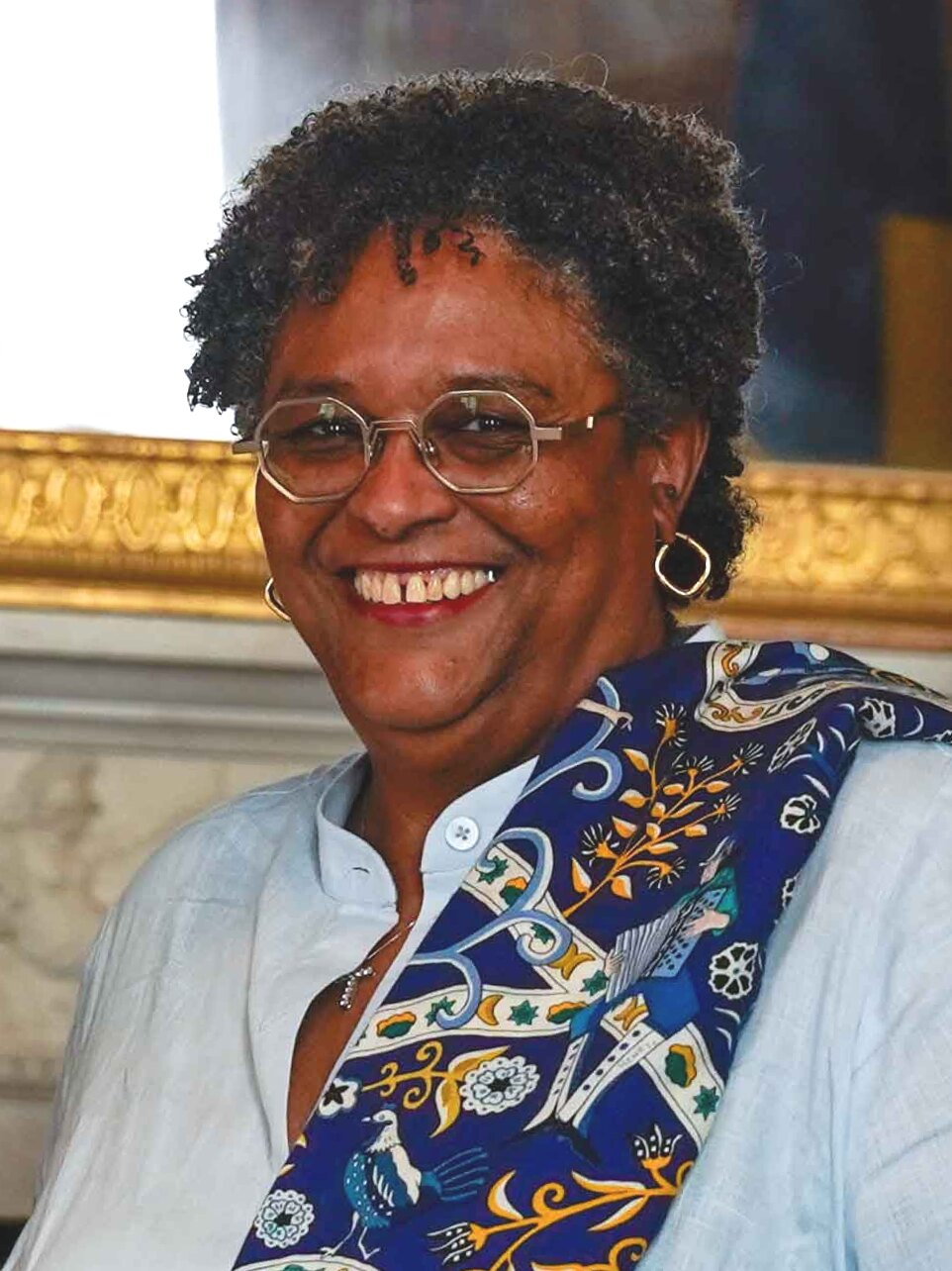

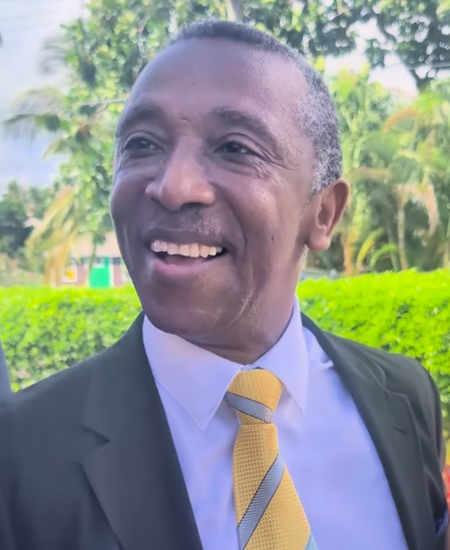
	First party	Second party
Leader	Mia Mottley	Ralph Thorne
Party	BLP	DLP
Leader since	26 February 2013	19 February 2024
Leader's seat	Saint Michael North East	Christ Church South; Ran in Saint John (lost)
Last election	69.03%, 30 seats	26.55%, 0 seats
Seats won	30	0
Seat change	Steady	Steady
Popular vote	71,109	27,808
Percentage	69.83%	27.31%
Swing	▲0.57 pp	▲0.90 pp
- Results by constituency
Prime Minister before election
Mia Mottley
BLP
Elected Prime Minister
Mia Mottley
BLP

General elections were held in Barbados on 11 February 2026 to elect the 30 members of the House of Assembly. Parliament was dissolved on 19 January and the final day for nominations was 27 January. The two leader candidates were Mia Mottley of the Barbados Labour Party and Ralph Thorne of the Democratic Labour Party. The ruling BLP won all 30 seats for the third election in a row, with DLP leader Thorne being defeated in St. John.

== Background ==
According to the Constitution of Barbados, the Parliament shall stand dissolved no later than every five years from the first sitting of Parliament. The previous general elections were held on 19 January 2022, and the first sitting of the new session of Parliament was held on 4 February 2022. After the dissolution of Parliament, the President of Barbados must issue a writ for a general election of members to the House of Assembly and for appointment of senators to the Senate within 90 days. The 2022 general elections saw the ruling Barbados Labour Party win all 30 seats for the second consecutive election since 2018. Following the loss, DLP leader Verla De Peiza resigned from party leadership on 21 January 2022.

Ronnie Yearwood was selected as the next DLP president on 1 May 2022. On 10 February 2024, Ralph Thorne crossed the floor and became opposition leader. After crossing, Thorne appointed Ryan Walters and Tricia Watson as opposition senators. Yearwood confirmed that Thorne officially joined the DLP and became the party's political leader on 19 February the same year. The DLP began losing confidence in Yearwood as DLP president after he attended a meeting with Saint Lucia's opposition leader Allen Chastanet without permission from Thorne. A power struggle within the party followed, with the DLP dividing into factions between Thorne and Yearwood. DLP general secretary Steve Blackett and Yearwood were suspended in May 2024 by the party's general council as a result of the struggle. Blackett and Yearwood were expelled from the DLP on 17 August 2024.

On 17 January 2026, Mia Mottley, the Prime Minister of Barbados, called for a new general election to be held less than a month away on 11 February of the same year.

== Electoral system ==
The 30 members of the House of Assembly are elected by first-past-the-post voting in single-member constituencies. The system is modeled on the Westminster system.

== Campaign ==
Following the call for an election on 17 January, DLP leader and leader of the opposition stated that the DLP was ready to campaign on cost of living, crime, and the healthcare system. In the early campaign, Grenville Phillips II, party president of Solutions Barbados, remarked that there was no room for a third party in Barbados but he was still willing to support candidates who ran under Solutions Barbados. Reform Barbados founder Steve Prescott stated that his party would platform on economic reform, cost of living, and addressing youth unemployment.

Prime Minister Mia Mottley addressed a crowd on 22 January, detailing the public sector wage increases, reductions in income taxes, improvement of health care, and investments in public transport. Ryan Walters, a DLP candidate in St. Michael North West, stressed that voter engagement was top priority for DLP in the elections. Charles McDonald Griffith, who was running against Thorne in St. John, stating that he had assisted in improvements of public transport, sanitation, and employment.

BLP candidates paid their election deposits on 22 January, followed by both the DLP and Friends of Democracy on 23 January. The DLP staged an islandwide motorcade on 24 January, which traveled through the constituencies of Bridgetown, St. Michael, St. James, St. Peter, St. Lucy, St. George, St. John, St. Philip, and Christ Church. Thorne made several claims throughout the election campaign of the BLP-led government "interfering" with the voter list and the work of the Electoral and Boundaries Commission (EBC), disenfranchising potential electors. He also called for an extension of voter registration deadlines. Mottley refuted his claims and invited authorities from the Caribbean Community (CARICOM) and Commonwealth of Nations to act as official election observers. She stated this decision was made in a bid to "protect the reputation of Barbados".

The BLP launched their party manifesto on 2 February, while the DLP launched their party manifesto on 8 February. The same day, Mottley criticised the DLP for giving Barbadians little time to analyse the DLP's manifesto. The FOD also outlined their policies on 8 February, calling for affordable housing, budget reform, and the reintroduction of capital and corporal punishment. The secretary general's office of the Commonwealth of Nations, which as a body had fielded election observers from other countries to Barbados, hailed the election as being peaceful and noted the "strong civic participation and respect for democratic rules". The press statement highlighted the fact "some names" were not found on the polling day voter's census. Though the overall election was summarized as being a positive example for the world.

== Conduct ==
Early voting was held for police officers and election day workers on 4 February. In previous elections, members of the overseas diplomatic corps have voted early as well. The EBC was reportedly in a state of readiness the day before the 11 February election. Polling was held from 06:00 to 18:00 (AST). Chief Electoral Officer Shirland Turton said there would be 542 polling boxes across the 30 constituencies, and more than 2,500 people were employed to facilitate operations at the various locations.

== Candidate affiliation ==
Ten political parties nominated candidates for this election. Including two independents, there were a total of 93 candidates. The slate of potential electors vying disclosed their affiliation under eight main political affiliations:

- The Barbados Labour Party (BLP) – the previous ruling party administration
- The Democratic Labour Party (DLP)
- Reform Barbados (RB)
- Solutions Barbados (SB)
- Friends of Democracy (FOD)
- Barbados Sovereignty Party (BSP)
- Bajan Free Party (BFP)
- The People's Coalition for Progress (PCP)

An independent coalition of smaller parties was announced involving an alliance comprising candidates running under the banner of: the New National Party (NNP), the United Progressive Party (UPP) and the Conservative Barbados Leadership Party (CBLP).

=== Parties ===
Party	Position	Ideology	Leader	Leader since	Leader's seat	2022 election		Seats at dissolution	Contested seats
Party	Position	Ideology	Leader	Leader since	Leader's seat	%	Seats	Seats at dissolution	Contested seats
Barbados Labour Party	Centre-left	Social democracy Republicanism	Mia Mottley	26 February 2013	St. Michael North East	69.26	30 / 30	29 / 30	30 seats
Democratic Labour Party	Centre-left	Social democracy Republicanism	Ralph Thorne	19 February 2024	Christ Church South Standing in St. John	26.41	0 / 30	1 / 30	30 seats
People's Coalition for Progress (NNP–UPP–CBLP)	Centre-left to centre-right	Social democracy Progressivism; Conservatism; Multiculturalism	Kemar Stuart; Lynette Eastmond; Corey Beckles	19 January 2026	Standing in St. John (Stuart); Standing in St. Philip West (Eastmond); Standing in City of Bridgetown (Beckles)	New	0 / 30	0 / 30	12 seats
Friends of Democracy	Centre-left	Social democracy	Karina Goodridge	18 May 2025	Standing in St. Phillip West	New	0 / 30	0 / 30	12 seats
Bajan Free Party		Government transparency Anti-corruption	Alex Mitchell	1 October 2012	Standing in St. Michael South	0.17	0 / 30	0 / 30	3 seats
Barbados Sovereignty Party			Michael Thompson		None	0.11	0 / 30	0 / 30	2 seats
Solutions Barbados	Centre	Third Way	Grenville Phillips II	1 July 2015	None	0.69	0 / 30	0 / 30	1 seat
Reform Barbados			Steve Prescott	2018	Standing in Christ Church East	New	0 / 30	0 / 30	1 seat

=== Candidates by constituencies ===
Source: The Nation Barbados

Name	BLP	DLP	FOD	PCP	SB	BFP	BSP	RB	Independent
City of Bridgetown	Michael Lashley	Dale Rowe		Corey Beckles					Patrick King
Christ Church East	Wilfred Abrahams	Amoy Bourne		Ingrid Best				Steven Prescott	
Christ Church East Central	Ryan Straughn	Quincy Jones	Dominique Yorke	Natalie Parris					
Christ Church South	Shantal Munro-Knight	Corey Greenidge		Christopher Alleyne	Robert Toussaint				
Christ Church West	William Duguid	Andrew Cave							
Christ Church West Central	Adrian Forde	Rasheed Belgrave							
St. Andrew	Romel Springer	Ramon Goodman							
St. George North	Toni Moore	David Walrond							
St. George South	Dwight Sutherland	Felicia Dujon							Suzanne Holligan
St. James Central	Kerrie Symmonds	Paul Gibson	Kerry Thomas						Erskine Alleyne
St. James North	Chad Blackman	Charles Worrel	Steffanie Williams						
St. James South	Sandra Husbands	Pedro Greaves	Matthew Thorne						
St. Lucy	Peter Phillips	Ian Griffith	Sherlan Davis	Wayne Griffith					
St. Michael Central	Tyra Trotman	Andre Worrel	Raymond Wiggins	Anthony Hinds					
St. Michael East	Trevor Prescod	Ensley Grainger		Carolyn Clarke					
St. Michael South	Kirk Humphrey	Nathaniel Boyce				Alex Mitchell			
St. Michael South Central	Marsha Caddle	Richard Sealy		David Gill					
St. Michael South East	Santia Bradshaw	Pedro Shepherd					Roy Turney		
St. Michael North	Davidson Ishmael	Dawn Armstrong	Ricardo Harrison						
St. Michael North East	Mia Mottley	Jamal Sandiford					Clarene Howard		
St. Michael North West	Neil Rowe	Ryan Walters	Ricardo Williams						
St. Michael West	Christopher Gibbs	Damien Fanus		Patsie Nurse					
St. Michael West Central	Ian Gooding-Edghill	James Paul, Chief Executive Officer of the Barbados Agricultural Society	Katrina Ramsay						
St. Peter	Colin Jordan	Jason Phillips							
St. Philip North	Dr. Sonia Browne	Simon Clarke	Anya Lorde	Nigel Newton					
St. Philip South	Indar Weir	Neil Marshall	Omar Smith			John Scantlebury			
St. Philip West	Kay McConney	David Estwick	Karina Goodridge	Lynette Eastmond					
St. John	Charles Griffith	Ralph Thorne		Kemar Stuart					
St. Joseph	Ryan Brathwaite	Randall Rouse							
St. Thomas	Gregory Nicholls	Rolerick Hinds				Irving Wittaker			

== Opinion polls ==
Polling firm	Last date of polling	Link	BLP	DLP	Others	Margin	Sample size	Lead
The Nation Barbados; Starcom Network (Note: Collaboration between The Nation Newspaper and Starcom Network. Poll figures are based on decided voters only excluding won't say, undecided and non voters)	31 January 2026		77.1	18.6	4.3	±3pp	1 145	58.5
	17 January 2026	Mia Mottley announces 2026 Barbadian general election						
2022 election	22 January 2022		69.26	26.41	4.35	—N/a	114,013	42.85

== Results ==
Early results first came in shortly after 11 pm local time, with a victory for the BLP's Santia Bradshaw in Saint Michael South East. A preliminary tally showed the BLP winning 15,978 votes (74.1%) and securing 21 seats, with the DLP winning 5,406 votes (25.1%) with no seats yet secured. By the early morning of 12 February, the BLP secured all 30 seats for the third election in a row. In St. John, Charles Griffith retained the seat with 2,327 votes, defeating DLP leader Ralph Thorne, who received 1,877 votes. In St. Michael North West, incumbent Neil Rowe won with 1,674 votes, defeating a strong challenge from DLP candidate Ryan Walters, who received 1,441 votes. In St. Michael Central and Bridgetown, BLP candidates who crossed the floor from the DLP won their respective races.

Party	Votes	%	+/–	Seats	+/–
Barbados Labour Party	71,109	69.83	+0.57	30	0
Democratic Labour Party	27,808	27.31	+0.90	0	0
Friends of Democracy	1,424	1.40	New	0	New
People's Coalition for Progress	910	0.89	New	0	New
Bajan Free Party	161	0.16	-0.01	0	0
Independents	426	0.42		0	0
Total	101,838	100.00	–	30	0
Source: Barbados Today

=== Results by constituency ===
Sources for votes:

==== Bridgetown ====
Candidate	Party	Votes	%	+/–
Michael Lashley	Barbados Labour Party	2,312	81.72	+4.22
Dale Rowe	Democratic Labour Party	425	15.02	-1.98
Corey Beckles	People's Coalition for Progress	92	3.25	New
Total		2,829	100.00	–
Barbados Labour Party hold				

==== Christ Church East ====
Candidate	Party	Votes	%	+/–
Wilfred Abrahams	Barbados Labour Party	3,318	72.26	-1.44
Amoy Gilding-Bourne	Democratic Labour Party	1,049	22.84	+1.44
Ingrid Best	People's Coalition for Progress	162	3.53	New
Stephen Prescott	Reform Barbados	63	1.37	New
Total		4,592	100.00	–
Barbados Labour Party hold		Swing		–0.15

==== Christ Church East Central ====
Candidate	Party	Votes	%	+/–
Ryan Straughn	Barbados Labour Party	3,003	66.07	+0.37
Quincy Jones	Democratic Labour Party	1,412	31.07	+2.37
Dominique Yorke	Friends of Democracy	81	1.78	New
Corey Beckles	People's Coalition for Progress	49	1.08	New
Total		4,545	100.00	–
Barbados Labour Party hold				

==== Christ Church South ====
Candidate	Party	Votes	%	+/–
Shantal Munro-Knight	Barbados Labour Party	2,300	66.59	-3.51
Corey Greenidge	Democratic Labour Party	1,048	30.34	+7.64
Robert Toussaint	Solutions Barbados	77	2.23	New
Christopher Alleyne	People's Coalition for Progress	29	0.84	New
Total		3,454	100.00	–
Barbados Labour Party hold				

==== Christ Church West ====
Candidate	Party	Votes	%	+/–
William Duguid	Barbados Labour Party	2,439	78.05	-1.55
Andrew Cave	Democratic Labour Party	686	21.95	+1.55
Total		3,125	100.00	–
Barbados Labour Party hold				

==== Christ Church West Central ====
Candidate	Party	Votes	%	+/–
Adrian Forde	Barbados Labour Party	1,080	72.97	+0.07
Rasheed Belgrave	Democratic Labour Party	400	27.03	+3.13
Total		1,480	100.00	–
Barbados Labour Party hold				

==== St. Andrew ====
Candidate	Party	Votes	%	+/–
Romel Springer	Barbados Labour Party	2,802	70.26	-4.54
Ramon Goodman	Democratic Labour Party	1,186	29.74	+7.24
Total		3,988	100.00	–
Barbados Labour Party hold				

==== St. George North ====
Candidate	Party	Votes	%	+/–
Toni Moore	Barbados Labour Party	3,276	75.47	+5.27
David Walrond	Democratic Labour Party	1,065	24.53	-0.17
Total		4,341	100.00	–
Barbados Labour Party hold				

==== St. George South ====
Candidate	Party	Votes	%	+/–
Dwight Sutherland	Barbados Labour Party	3,517	71.86	-0.94
Felicia Dujon	Democratic Labour Party	1,127	23.03	+0.33
Suzanne Holligan	Independent	250	5.11	New
Total		4,894	100.00	–
Barbados Labour Party hold				

==== St. James Central ====
Candidate	Party	Votes	%	+/–
Kerrie Symmonds	Barbados Labour Party	2,379	70.68	+0.38
Paul Gibson	Democratic Labour Party	853	25.34	-1.06
Kerry Thomas	Friends of Democracy	82	2.44	New
Erskine Alleyne	Independent	52	1.54	
Total		3,366	100.00	–
Barbados Labour Party hold				

==== St. James North ====
Candidate	Party	Votes	%	+/–
Chad Blackman	Barbados Labour Party	2,658	82.62	+1.92
Charles Worrell	Democratic Labour Party	416	12.93	-6.37
Steffanie William	Friends of Democracy	143	4.45	New
Total		3,217	100.00	–
Barbados Labour Party hold				

==== St. James South ====
Candidate	Party	Votes	%	+/–
Sandra Husbands	Barbados Labour Party	2,746	59.90	-3.9
Pedro Greaves	Democratic Labour Party	1,655	36.10	-0.1
Matthew Thorne	Friends of Democracy	183	3.99	New
Total		4,584	100.00	–
Barbados Labour Party hold				

==== St. John ====
Candidate	Party	Votes	%	+/–
Charles McDonald Griffith	Barbados Labour Party	2,327	52.42	-5.58
Ralph Thorne	Democratic Labour Party	1,876	42.26	+4.06
Kemar Stuart	People's Coalition for Progress	236	5.32	New
Total		4,439	100.00	–
Barbados Labour Party gain from Democratic Labour Party				

==== St. Joseph ====
Candidate	Party	Votes	%	+/–
Ryan Brathwaite	Barbados Labour Party	2,662	74.96	+7.86
Randall Rouse	Democratic Labour Party	889	25.04	-4.56
Total		3,551	100.00	–
Barbados Labour Party hold				

==== St. Lucy ====
Candidate	Party	Votes	%	+/–
Peter Phillips	Barbados Labour Party	2,211	50.16	-9.64
Ian Griffith	Democratic Labour Party	2,026	45.96	+8.46
Wayne Griffith	People's Coalition for Progress	134	3.04	New
Sherland Davis	Friends of Democracy	37	0.84	New
Total		4,408	100.00	–
Barbados Labour Party hold				

==== St. Michael Central ====
Candidate	Party	Votes	%	+/–
Tyra Trotman	Barbados Labour Party	1,962	73.59	+5.79
Andre Worrell	Democratic Labour Party	464	17.40	-5.2
Raymond Wiggins	Friends of Democracy	168	6.30	New
Anthony Hinds	People's Coalition for Progress	72	2.70	New
Total		2,666	100.00	–
Barbados Labour Party hold				

==== St. Michael East ====
Candidate	Party	Votes	%	+/–
Trevor Prescod	Barbados Labour Party	2,221	66.92	+2.62
Ensley Grainger	Democratic Labour Party	962	28.98	-1.22
Carolyn Clarke	People's Coalition for Progress	136	4.10	New
Total		3,319	100.00	–
Barbados Labour Party hold				

==== St. Michael North ====
Candidate	Party	Votes	%	+/–
Davidson Ishmael	Barbados Labour Party	2,273	70.28	-1.12
Dawn-Marie Armstrong	Democratic Labour Party	772	23.87	+1.37
Bertnul Harrison	Friends of Democracy	189	5.84	New
Total		3,234	100.00	–
Barbados Labour Party hold				

==== St. Michael North East ====
Candidate	Party	Votes	%	+/–
Mia Mottley	Barbados Labour Party	3,570	88.00	+2.0
Jamal Sandiford	Democratic Labour Party	391	9.64	-3.06
Clerene Howard	Barbados Sovereignty Party	96	2.37	New
Total		4,057	100.00	–
Barbados Labour Party hold				

==== St. Michael North West ====
Candidate	Party	Votes	%	+/–
Neil Rowe	Barbados Labour Party	1,674	53.13	-10.97
Ryan Walters	Democratic Labour Party	1,441	45.73	+9.83
Ricardo Williams	Friends of Democracy	36	1.14	New
Total		3,151	100.00	–
Barbados Labour Party hold				

==== St. Michael South ====
Candidate	Party	Votes	%	+/–
Kirk Humphrey	Barbados Labour Party	2,181	79.34	+5.04
Nathaniel Boyce	Democratic Labour Party	511	18.59	-1.81
Alex Mitchell	Bajan Free Party	57	2.07	New
Total		2,749	100.00	–
Barbados Labour Party hold				

==== St. Michael South Central ====
Candidate	Party	Votes	%	+/–
Marsha Caddle	Barbados Labour Party	1,859	64.75	+1.55
Richard Sealy	Democratic Labour Party	911	31.73	+1.33
David Gill	People's Coalition for Progress	101	3.52	New
Total		2,871	100.00	–
Barbados Labour Party hold				

==== St. Michael South East ====
Candidate	Party	Votes	%	+/–
Santia Bradshaw	Barbados Labour Party	3,015	79.36	+3.36
Pedro Shepherde	Democratic Labour Party	734	19.32	+0.22
Roy Turney	Barbados Sovereignty Party	50	1.32	New
Total		3,799	100.00	–
Barbados Labour Party hold				

==== St. Michael West ====
Candidate	Party	Votes	%	+/–
Christopher Gibbs	Barbados Labour Party	2,501	79.05	-1.05
Damien Fanus	Democratic Labour Party	663	20.95	+6.45
Patsy Nurse	People's Coalition for Progress	0	0.00	New
Total		3,164	100.00	–
Barbados Labour Party hold				

==== St. Michael West Central ====
Candidate	Party	Votes	%	+/–
Ian Gooding-Edghill	Barbados Labour Party	2,298	79.99	+8.09
James Paul	Democratic Labour Party	508	17.68	-1.02
Katrina Ramsay	Friends of Democracy	67	2.33	New
Total		2,873	100.00	–
Barbados Labour Party hold				

==== St. Peter ====
Candidate	Party	Votes	%	+/–
Colin Jordan	Barbados Labour Party	3,016	72.19	-3.71
Jason Phillips	Democratic Labour Party	1,162	27.81	+6.11
Total		4,178	100.00	–
Barbados Labour Party hold				

==== St. Philip North ====
Candidate	Party	Votes	%	+/–
Sonia Browne	Barbados Labour Party	2,434	51.71	+1.21
Simon Clarke	Democratic Labour Party	2,128	45.21	-0.29
Anya Lorde	Friends of Democracy	119	2.53	New
Nigel Newton	People's Coalition for Progress	26	0.55	New
Total		4,707	100.00	–
Barbados Labour Party hold				

==== St. Philip South ====
Candidate	Party	Votes	%	+/–
Indar Weir	Barbados Labour Party	3,063	61.97	-0.33
Neil Marshall	Democratic Labour Party	1,703	34.45	+3.35
Omar Smith	Friends of Democracy	113	2.29	New
John Scantlebury	Bajan Free Party	64	1.29	New
Total		4,943	100.00	–
Barbados Labour Party hold				

==== St. Philip West ====
Candidate	Party	Votes	%	+/–
Kay McConney	Barbados Labour Party	2,740	50.53	+0.43
David Estwick	Democratic Labour Party	2,187	40.33	-1.17
Karina Goodridge	Friends of Democracy	323	5.96	New
Lynette Eastmond	People's Coalition for Progress	173	3.19	New
Total		5,423	100.00	–
Barbados Labour Party hold				

==== St. Thomas ====
Candidate	Party	Votes	%	+/–
Gregory Nicholls	Barbados Labour Party	3,734	79.80	+1.2
Rolerick Hinds	Democratic Labour Party	861	18.40	+1.9
Irvin Whittaker	Bajan Free Party	84	1.80	New
Total		4,679	100.00	–
Barbados Labour Party hold				

== Reactions ==
=== Domestic ===
Prime Minister Mia Mottley declared a bank holiday for 13 February and announced a nation thanksgiving and rally for 14 February. Mottley remarked that the victory from the elections carried responsibility, not entitlement. She stressed the need to protect democratic institutions and pledged renewed focus on the issues of public safety and health care. Mottley announced that her new cabinet would be sworn in on 16 February and that parliament had been asked to reconvene no later than 20 February.

DLP leader Ralph Thorne described the results as disappointing and vowed that the party would continue to move forward. Thorne also expressed frustration during voting processes, stating that he could not vote in Rendezvous since he had not lived there in more than two decades. Thorne later indicated that he would be stepping down from DLP leadership, stating that the party would rebuild without him at the helm.

People's Coalition for Progress candidate Kemar Stuart raised concerns about voters being left off the electoral list or being enrolled in another constituency. Stuart called for a fixed date for elections, stated that the party was willing to coalition with Friends of Democracy, and opposed a potential constitutional change that would have prevented members of the Assembly from crossing the floor. PCP member Lynette Eastmond also similarly criticised the anti-defection legislation.

FOD leader Karina Goodridge congratulated Mottley, stated that the party would remain engaged with the community, and urged perseverance.

=== International ===
After Mottley was elected to a third term in office, U.S. Secretary of State Marco Rubio offered congratulations, commenting that the United States was looking forward in expanding collaboration with the government of Barbados and "strengthening regional security by deepening cooperation to counter transnational criminal organizations and illicit trafficking". Indian prime minister Narendra Modi congratulated Mottley, stating that he looks forward to "working closely with her to further strengthen our partnership for the benefit of our peoples". Chinese Foreign Ministry's spokesperson Lin Jian congratulated Mottley in a press briefing, stating that China was "willing to work with Barbados to expand practical cooperation across various fields and to bring their friendship to a new level".

Mottley was congratulated by Anguillan premier Cora Richardson Hodge, Antiguan and Barbudan prime minister Gaston Browne, the United Democratic Party of Belize, Bermudan premier David Burt, Cuban president Miguel Diaz Canel, Dominican prime minister Roosevelt Skerrit, Guyanese president Irfaan Ali and opposition leader Azruddin Mohamed, Jamaican prime minister Andrew Holness and opposition leader Mark Golding of the People's National Party, Nicaraguan co-presidents Daniel Ortega Saavedra and Rosario Murillo, Kittitian prime minister Terrance Drew, Vincentian prime minister Godwin Friday, Surinamese president Jennifer Simons, and Trinidadian prime minister Kamla Persad-Bissessar and opposition leader Pennelope Beckles-Robinson.

== Aftermath ==
Prime Minister Mottley was sworn in for a third term on 12 February, having taken the oath of office in the presence of President Jeffrey Bostic, family members, and invited guests. In her victory speech, she stated that her government would work to reduce poverty and remove injustice so that opportunities for the people of Barbados would be created.

Wilfred Abrahams was also sworn on 12 February as the next Attorney General of Barbados, replacing the retiring Dale Marshall. Abrahams stated that he intended to continue fully staffing the police force and was eager to immediately begin work after meeting with staff.

Mottley's third cabinet was sworn on 16 February, which composed of 22 members of the Assembly and five government senators. In an address, Mottley said that the Cabinet represented a team for the changing times, different from the circumstances back in 2018. Mottley also stated that the new term would focus on economic expansion, private sector growth, productivity gains, and expanding affordability.

Eight members of the Assembly and the other seven government senators were sworn in on 19 February. President Bostic, who administered the oath of office, instructed the government senators to operate without fear or favour and do their best to serve the nation of Barbados. Seven independent senators picked by Bostic were sworn in during a later ceremony. For the opposition senators, President Bostic requested three to four names for consideration from the DLP. However, the DLP could only provide two names: DLP president Ralph Thorne and businessman Ryan Walters. Bostic decided to swear in FOD leader Karina Goodridge and DLP member Ryan Walters as the two opposition senators. After Walters was sworn in as opposition senator, he became the de facto political leader of the DLP in Parliament, as the DLP had no seats in the House of Assembly. The appointment of Goodridge also made her the first third-party representative appointed to parliamentary office in Barbados, a nation that was traditionally dominated by the BLP and the DLP.

Parliament was formally reopened on 20 February. Instead of the traditional speech that outlined the government's programme, President Bostic deviated, choosing to make a personal address of concerns toward the Parliament for the first time in the nation's history, identifying traffic congestion, gun violence, and education as the main topics the Parliament should address. The House of Assembly then moved forward to elect a speaker from someone who did not face the electorate for the first time since Parliament first opened in June 1639. Arthur Holder was re-elected as the first independently elected Speaker of the House of Assembly, making him the 31st member of the House of Assembly.

== See also ==
- Electoral and Boundaries Commission (Barbados)
