= List of political parties in Barbados =

This article lists political parties in Barbados.

Barbados has a two-party system, which means that there are two dominant political parties, with extreme difficulty for anybody to achieve electoral success under the banner of any other party. Occasionally various members of political parties in Barbados have used an option of crossing the floor.

== The parties ==
=== Major parties ===
Party	Abbr.	Leader	Political position	Ideology	Senators	Assembly members
Barbados Labour Party	BLP	Mia Mottley	Centre-left	Social democracy; Republicanism	12 / 21	30 / 30
Democratic Labour Party	DLP	Vacant	Centre-left	Social democracy; Republicanism	1 / 21	0 / 30
Friends of Democracy	FOD	Karina Goodridge	Centre-left	Social democracy; Republicanism	1 / 21	0 / 30

=== Others ===
- People's Coalition for Progress (PCP)
- Bajan Free Party (BFP)
- Barbados Sovereignty Party (BSP)
- Clement Payne Movement (CPM)
- Conservative Barbados Leadership Party (CBLP)
- Friends of Democracy (FOD)
- Kingdom Government of Barbados (KGB)
- New National Party (NNP)
- New Barbados Kingdom Alliance (NBKA)
- Pan-Caribbean Congress (PCP)
- People's Democratic Congress (Barbados) (PDC)
- People's Empowerment Party (PEP)
- People’s Party for Democracy and Development
- Reform Barbados (RB)
- Solutions Barbados (SB)
- United Progressive Party (Barbados) (UPP)

=== Defunct ===
- Alliance Party for Progress (APP)
- Barbados Electors Association (BEA)
- Barbados Integrity Movement (BIM)
- Barbados National Party (BNP)
- Coalition of United Parties (CUP)
- Citizens Action Partnership (CAP)
- National Democratic Party (NDP)
- Progressive Conservative Party (PCP)
- People's Political Alliance (PPA)
- People's Progressive Movement (PPM)
- Workers Party of Barbados (WPB)
- West Indian National Congress Party (CP)

Names in italics denote Electoral Alliances

== See also ==
- Politics of Barbados
- List of political parties by country
