= Electoral alliance =

Association of political parties for elections

An electoral alliance (also known as a bipartisan electoral agreement, electoral pact, electoral agreement, electoral coalition or electoral bloc) is an association of political parties or individuals that exists solely to stand in elections.

Each of the parties within the alliance has its own policies but chooses temporarily to put aside differences in favour of common goals and ideology in order to pool their voters' support and get elected. On occasion, an electoral alliance may be formed by parties with very different policy goals, which agree to pool resources in order to stop a particular candidate or party from gaining power.

Unlike a coalition formed after an election, the partners in an electoral alliance usually do not run candidates against one another but encourage their supporters to vote for candidates from the other members of the alliance. In some agreements with a larger party enjoying a higher degree of success at the polls, the smaller party fields candidates under the banner of the larger party, with the elected members of the smaller party sitting with the elected members of the larger party in the cabinet or legislature. They usually aim to continue co-operation after the election, for example by campaigning together on issues on which they have common views. If the alliance endures beyond elections, the association is a parliamentary group.

By offering to endorse or nominate a major party's candidate, minor parties may be in position to influence the candidate's platform.

== By country ==
=== Argentina ===
The Frente de Todos (Everybody's Front or Front for All)) was a coalition of Peronist and Kirchnerist political parties and associations in Argentina formed in 2019 to support the candidacy of Alberto Fernández and Cristina Fernández de Kirchner in the 2019 Argentine general election.

Juntos por el Cambio (Together for Change) is an Argentine big tent political coalition. It was created in 2015 as Cambiemos (Let's Change), and renamed in 2019. It is composed of Republican Proposal (PRO), the Radical Civic Union (UCR), the Civic Coalition (CC-ARI) and sectors of Federal Peronism since the arrival of Miguel Ángel Pichetto to the national coalition.

=== Armenia ===
Prior to the 2018 Armenian parliamentary election, the Republic Party formed an electoral alliance known as the We Alliance with the Free Democrats. Both parties campaigned on a similar Pro-European platform and sought to challenge a competing electoral alliance known as the My Step Alliance.

=== Barbados ===
The Alliance Party for Progress (APP) was a Christian and social democratic electoral alliance in Barbados. It was formed on 30 December 2021 by the United Progressive Party (UPP) and the People's Party for Democracy and Development (PdP) to contest the 2022 Barbadian general election. It is headed by the leader of the PdP, Bishop Joseph Atherley, with the leader of the UPP Lynette Eastmond becoming deputy head..

The UPP announced on 19 January 2026, that it was forming an electoral alliance known as the People's Coalition for Progress (PCP) with the New National Party (NNP) and the Conservative Barbados Leadership Party (CBLP) to contest the 2026 Barbadian general election. That same day Atherley, announced that "I'm not involved in any of these coalitions. I'm not a member of any of the two major parties, nor have I been involved to this moment with any of the two main parties." and that the PdP would not be contesting the 2026 Barbadian general election, signalling an end to the electoral alliance.

=== Belgium ===
In Belgium, the Dutch term for an electoral alliance is kartel. Current kartels include the following:

- Open Flemish Liberals and Democrats, composed of the parties Flemish Liberals and Democrats, Vivant, and Liberal Appeal
- Mouvement Réformateur, composed of the Liberal Reformist Party, the Citizens' Movement for Change, and the Partei für Freiheit und Fortschritt
- Vlaams Belang and VLOTT

Previous kartels include the following:

- SP.A–Spirit
- Christen-Democratisch en Vlaams/Nieuw-Vlaamse Alliantie
- Mouvement Réformateur/Fédéralistes Démocrates Francophones

=== Denmark ===
The Red-Green Alliance was formed as an electoral alliance between the Communist Party (DKP), the Left Socialists (VS), and the Socialist Workers Party (SAP) in 1989. It reformed itself as a unified party in 1991, but the participating parties continue on their own in some ways (for example by having their own separate party newspapers).

=== Greece ===
The Syriza Party started out as an electoral alliance but then united into a single party.

=== Italy ===
Since 1994, Italian politics has been divided into two main blocs, the centre-right and the centre-left coalitions; which under various forms alternatively led the country for more than two decades.

==== Centre-right coalition ====
For the 2022 general election the coalition was composed of four parties, the Brothers of Italy, League (Lega), Forza Italia and Us Moderates.

==== Centre-left coalition ====
For the 2022 general election the alliance was formed by four parties; Democratic Party – Democratic and Progressive Italy, More Europe, Civic Commitment and Greens and Left Alliance.

=== Netherlands ===
==== Combination of lists ====
Dutch elections from 1973 to 2017 allowed for electoral alliances between two parties where both parties would nominate a combined party list. This practice, called the lijstverbinding, was abolished in June 2017 after being earlier abandoned for Senate elections.

Typically, the parties in a coalition are ideologically related. For example, in the 2003 general elections, the Socialist Party and GreenLeft formed a lijstverbinding. In the 2004 European elections the social-democratic PvdA and GreenLeft formed a lijstverbinding. The Orthodox Protestant Reformed Political Party and Christian Union have also formed a lijstverbinding in the past.

==== Common list ====
In a common list two or more political parties share a list and often have a common political programme for the election. The participating political parties are identifiable for the voters because the names of these parties are mentioned on the voting paper. It is similar to electoral fusion as voters give their votes to specific candidates on the list.

=== Philippines ===
Philippine Senate elections since 1987 have been primarily contested by multi-party electoral alliances, with guest candidates if an alliance is not able to complete a 12-person slate. Slates having guest candidates is seen as a weakness of finding candidates within their ranks. This has been a feature of midterm elections, where there are usually two or three major coalitions, with presidential elections years having major presidential candidates putting up their own senatorial slates.

=== Turkey ===
==== Holy Alliance ====
An electoral alliance called the "holy alliance" was formed by the Welfare Party, Nationalist Task Party and Reformist Democracy Party to contest in the 1991 Turkish general election.

==== SHP-HEP Alliance ====
Before the 1991 Turkish general election, the social democratic SHP and pro-Kurdish HEP formed an electoral alliance.

==== Nation Alliance ====
The Nation Alliance (Turkish: Millet İttifakı) is an electoral alliance in Turkey made up of some of the major Turkish opposition parties to run under a common banner in the country's 2018 general-presidential election, later for the 2019 local elections, and for the 2023 presidential and parliamentary elections. The alliance consists of the Republican People's Party, Good Party, Felicity Party, and Democrat Party.

==== People's Alliance ====
The People's Alliance (Turkish: Cumhur İttifakı) is an electoral alliance in Turkey, established in February 2018 between the ruling Justice and Development Party and the former opposition Nationalist Movement Party. The alliance was formed to contest the 2018 general election, and brings together the political parties supporting the re-election of President Recep Tayyip Erdoğan.

==== Labour and Freedom Alliance ====
The Labour and Freedom Alliance (Turkish: Emek ve Özgürlük İttifakı, Kurdish: Hevkariya Ked û Azadiyê) is formed from the Peoples' Democratic Party, Workers' Party of Turkey, Labour Party, Labourist Movement Party, Social Freedom Party and Federation of Socialist Councils to contest the 2023 presidential and parliamentary elections.

==== Union of Socialist Forces ====
Made up of the Communist Party of Turkey, Communist Movement of Turkey, Revolution Movement and the Left Party to contest the 2023 presidential and parliamentary elections.

==== Ancestor Alliance ====
Made up of the Victory Party, Justice Party, Turkey Alliance Party and My Country Party to contest the 2023 presidential and parliamentary elections.

=== United Kingdom ===
==== Labour and Co-operative ====
An electoral alliance survives to this day between the Labour Party and the Co-operative Party, which fields Labour Co-operative candidates in general elections in several constituencies, and in some local council elections. They have jointly contested elections since the 1927 Cheltenham Agreement. As of the 2019 general election, there are 38 Labour Co-operative MPs, the fourth-largest political grouping in the Commons (after the Conservative Party, Labour and the Scottish National Party).

==== SDP–Liberal Alliance ====
The SDP–Liberal Alliance began in 1981, shortly after the Limehouse Declaration. The Alliance contested the 1983 and 1987 elections, and became defunct in 1988, when the parties merged into the Liberal Democrats. In the first few years of the alliance, Liberals and Social Democrats were very confident it would be a success, David Steel even suggesting that Alliance could form the next government. Later on, however, the alliance faced difficulty with political and personal clashes between Steel and David Owen, as well as presentation issues (such as contradiction on policy). When the parties merged in 1988, Owen did not join the Liberal Democrats.

==== TUSC ====
A socialist coalition comprising RMT, Socialist Party, Solidarity, &c. candidates, the TUSC formed to contest the 2010 general election. The alliance has been consistently electorally unsuccessful, also contesting the 2015 general election, but endorsing Labour in 2017.

==== Unite to Remain ====
In the 2019 United Kingdom general election, pro-EU parties formed a pact in English and Welsh seats.

== Other examples ==
- United Torah Judaism in Israel
- Yulia Tymoshenko Bloc, which functioned in Ukraine, 2001–2011
- Unitary Democratic Coalition (Unitarian Democratic Coalition) in Portugal
- Labour and Co-operative in the United Kingdom
- Ulster Conservatives and Unionists in the United Kingdom
- Socialist Alliance in England
- Tripartite Alliance (including the ANC and SACP) in South Africa
- Democratic Unity Roundtable in Venezuela
- National Democratic Alliance in India
- National Democratic Pole in Armenia
- Pakatan Harapan (Alliance of Hope) in Malaysia
- Progressive alliance in the United Kingdom
- Solidarity–People Before Profit in Ireland
- Junts pel Sí in Catalonia, Spain
- Unidas Podemos in Spain
- UniTeam in the Philippines

== See also ==
- Apparentment
- Electoral list
- Tactical voting
- Political coalition
- Electoral fusion
- Vote swapping
