= Ryan Brathwaite (politician) =

Barbadian politician

Member of the House of Assembly of Barbados for Saint Joseph
- Incumbent
- Assumed office 11 February 2026
- Prime Minister: Mia Mottley
- Preceded by: Dale Marshall

Personal details
- Party: Barbados Labour Party

Ryan Brathwaite is a Barbadian politician from the Barbados Labour Party (BLP). In the 2026 Barbadian general election, he was elected Barbados Labour Party MP for Saint Joseph. He succeeded attorney general Dale Marshall. He is an engineer and community activist.
