= Saint James Central (Barbados Parliament constituency) =

Parliamentary constituency in Barbados

- Constituency for the House of Assembly of Barbados
- Region: Saint James, Barbados

Current constituency
- Created: 2003
- Seats: 1
- Party: Barbados Labour Party
- Member: Kerrie Symmonds

Saint James Central is a constituency in the Saint James parish of Barbados. It was established in 2003. Since 2018, it has been represented in the House of Assembly of the Barbadian Parliament by Kerrie Symmonds, a member of the BLP. (Note: As with all constituencies, the constituency elects one member of parliament (MP) by the first past the post system of election at least every five years.) The Saint James Central constituency is a safe seat for the BLP.

== Boundaries ==
The constituency runs:

From a point on the western seacoast west of the terminus of the Batts Rock Road in a straight line to Batts Rock Road; thence along the middle of Batts Rock Road to its junction with Highway 1 (the Bridgetown-Holetown Road); thence in an easterly direction to the base of the Prospect-Appleby-Derricks Hill; thence in a northerly direction along the base of the Prospect-Appleby-Derricks Hill to a point at which it is crossed by Holders Hill Road-Thorpes Road; thence in an easterly and then southerly direction along the Holders Hill Road-Thorpes Road to its junction with Denny Road; thence along the middle of Denny Road to and through the southern side of Lot #18 Prior Park Gardens; thence in an easterly direction along the Prior Park Gardens Road to its junction with Prior Park Road; thence in a northerly direction to its junction with Prior Park Roundabout; thence in an easterly direction to its junction with the Ronald Mapp Highway (the Warrens-Bennetts Road); thence in a southerly direction along the Ronald Mapp Highway to its junction with the Terrace Drive Road, Welches Terrace; thence in an easterly direction along the middle of the Terrace Drive Road to the Apple Grove Gully; thence in a north-easterly direction along the Apple Grove Gully to its junction with the Bagatelle-Grand View Road; thence in a north-westerly direction along the Bagatelle-Grand View Road to its junction with the Ronald Mapp Highway; thence in a northerly direction along the middle of the Ronald Mapp Highway to its junction with the Ridgeway Bridge; thence in a westerly direction to a point adjacent to monument (B.8); thence in a northerly direction to the monument (B.8); thence in an easterly direction along the Seaview-Reeves Hill Road to its junction with the Ronald Mapp Highway; thence in a northerly direction to its junction with Highway C (the Trents-Apes Hill Road); thence in a westerly direction along Highway C to its junction with Highway 1 (the Bridgetown-Speightstown Road); thence in a westerly direction to a point on the seacoast; thence in a southerly direction along the seacoast to the point west of the terminus at the Batts Rock Road (the starting point).

== Members ==
Election	Member	Party
2018	Kerrie Symmonds	BLP
2022	Kerrie Symmonds	BLP
2026	Kerrie Symmonds	BLP

== Elections ==
=== 2026 ===
Candidate	Party	Votes	%
Kerrie Symmonds	Barbados Labour Party	2,379	71.79
Paul Gibson	Democratic Labour Party	853	25.74
Kerry Thomas	Friends of Democracy	82	2.47
Erskine Alleyne	Independent	0	0.00
Total		3,314	100.00
Barbados Labour Party hold			

=== 2022 ===
St. James Central
Party	Candidate	Votes	%	±%
BLP	Kerrie Symonds	2,421	70.3	−7.9
DLP	Paul Gibson	911	26.4	+10.4
Independent	Erskine Alleyne	62	1.8	New
Independent	Joseph Jordan	52	1.5	+0.4
Majority		1,510	43.8	−18.4
Turnout		3,446		
BLP hold		Swing	-9.1	

=== 2018 ===
St. James Central
Party	Candidate	Votes	%	±%
BLP	Kerrie Symmonds	3,577	78.2	+28.0
DLP	George Connolly	733	16.0	−32.7
SB	Daniel Chalbaud	123	2.7	new
UPP	Wendell Callender	64	1.4	new
Independent	Joseph Jordan	49	1.1	new
People's Democratic Congress	Eric Marshall	28	0.6	−0.5
Majority		2,844	62.2	+60.7
Turnout		4,574		
BLP hold		Swing	+30.4	
