= People's Party for Democracy and Development =

Political party in Barbados

- Leader: Bishop Joseph Atherley MP
- Founded: 8 June 2019
- Split from: Barbados Labour Party
- Ideology: Social democracy Christian left Christian democracy
- Political position: Centre-left
- Colours: Green
- Slogan: "God, Growth, and Peace"
- House of Assembly: 0 / 30
- Senate: 0 / 21

The People's Party for Democracy and Development (PdP), abbreviated as the People's Party, is a political party in Barbados established on 8 June 2019 and led by Joseph Atherley. At its foundation, it served as the main opposition party in both houses of the Barbadian Parliament, with one seat in the House of Assembly and two seats in the Senate from 8 June 2019 till 19 January 2022.

== Background ==
The initial grouping emerged shortly after the 2018 general elections, where the Barbados Labour Party (BLP) defeated the ruling Democratic Labour Party (DLP) to win all 30 seats in the House of Assembly. This result left vacant the position of Leader of the Opposition and the two seats held by the second largest party in the Senate. On 31 May 2018, Joseph Atherley, who had been elected for St. Michael West, announced that he would be leaving the party to become Leader of the Opposition, which enabled him to advise on the appointment of the two minority Senators. He rejected suggestions of joining the DLP, and decided to proceed as an independent.

On 8 June 2019, Atherley publicly launched an opposition party, the People's Party for Democracy and Development (PdP). With the slogan "God, Growth, and Peace", the party would be social democratic in orientation. Atherley revealed that the PdP had been initially founded on 1 November 2018.

As of the party's foundation, Atherley was the only PdP member of the House of Assembly, which automatically made him Leader of the Opposition. Crystal Drakes and Caswell Franklyn represent the party in the Senate.

On 27 December 2021, Prime Minister of Barbados Mia Mottley dissolved parliament and called elections for 19 January 2022. The next week, on the 31 December 2021, Atherley and Lynette Eastmond of the United Progressive Party announced an electoral alliance between their two parties to contest the 2022 general elections as the Alliance Party for Progress. It is headed by Atherley with Eastmond becoming deputy head.

After the 2022 general elections, the party lost its sole seat in the House of Assembly and was reduced from being the main opposition party to being extra-parliamentary.

The UPP announced on 19 January 2026, that it was forming an electoral alliance known as the People's Coalition for Progress (PCP) with the New National Party and the Conservative Barbados Leadership Party to contest the 2026 Barbadian general election. That same day Atherley, announced that "I’m not involved in any of these coalitions. I’m not a member of any of the two major parties, nor have I been involved to this moment with any of the two main parties.” and that the PdP would not be contesting the 2026 Barbadian general election, signalling an end to the electoral alliance.

== Electoral history ==
For 2022 Barbadian general election, the PdP formed an electoral alliance with the United Progressive Party (Barbados) (UPP) and formed the Alliance Party for Progress and ran under that banner.

Election	Electoral Alliance	Leader	Votes		Seats		Position	Government
Election	Electoral Alliance	Leader	No.	Share	No.	+/–	Position	Government
2022	APP	Joseph Atherley	3,205	2.81%	0 / 30	New	3rd	Extra-parliamentary
