= Saint Philip South (Barbados Parliament constituency) =

Parliamentary constituency in Barbados

- Constituency for the House of Assembly of Barbados
- Region: Saint Philip, Barbados

Current constituency
- Created: 1971

Saint Philip South is a constituency in the Saint Philip parish of Barbados. It was established in 1971. Since 2018, it has been represented in the House of Assembly of the Barbadian Parliament by Indar Weir, a member of the BLP. (Note: As with all constituencies, the constituency elects one member of parliament (MP) by the first past the post system of election at least every five years.) The Saint Philip South constituency is a marginal seat for the BLP.

== Boundaries ==
The constituency runs:

From Shark’s Hole on the south eastern sea coast in a straight line to the junction of Belair-Sam Lords Road with Long Bay Road; thence along the middle of Long Bay Road to its junction at the Robinsons Corner with Merricks-Eastbourne Road; thence in a westerly direction along the middle of the Merricks-Eastbourne Road to its junction with the Six Roads Roundabout and Highway 5B (the Six Cross Road-Kirtons Road); thence in a southerly direction along the middle of Highway 5B to the junction with the Four Roads-Oldbury Road; thence along the middle of the Four Roads-Oldbury Road to its junction with the Mangrove-Oldbury Road; thence in an easterly direction along the middle of the Mangrove-Kirtons Road and thence to its junction with the Kirtons-Spencers Road; thence in a south westerly, and westerly direction along the middle of the Kirtons-Spencers Road to its junction with Highway 7 (the Rock Hall-Spencers Road); thence along the middle of Highway 7 in a westerly direction to its junction with a track to the west of the Rock Hall Village; thence in a south easterly, easterly and southerly direction along this track to a point on the cliff edge to the east of the airport boundary fence (Monument B.17); thence in a southerly direction to the sea; thence in an easterly direction along the sea coast to Shark’s Hole (the starting point).

== Members ==
Election	Member	Party
2018	Indar Weir	BLP
2022	Indar Weir	BLP

== Elections ==
=== 2022 ===
St. Philip South
Party	Candidate	Votes	%	±%
BLP	Indar Weir	3,175	62.3	−8.8
DLP	Neil Marshall	1,585	31.1	+8.4
APP	Bruce Hennis	225	4.4	+2.5
SB	Ronald Lorde	109	2.1	−1.5
Majority		1,590	31.2	−17.2
Turnout		5,094		
BLP hold		Swing	-8.6	

=== 2018 ===
St. Philip South
Party	Candidate	Votes	%	±%
BLP	Indar Weir	4,656	71.1	+24.1
DLP	Adriel Brathwaite	1,488	22.7	−30.3
SB	Ronald Lorde	239	3.6	new
UPP	Bruce Hennis	127	1.9	new
Bajan Free Party	John Scantlebury	39	0.6	new
Majority		3,168	48.4	+42.3
Turnout		6,549		
BLP gain from DLP		Swing	+27.2	
