= Politics of Barbados =

The politics of Barbados function within a framework of a parliamentary republic with strong democratic traditions; constitutional safeguards for nationals of Barbados include: freedom of speech, press, worship, movement, and association.

Executive power is vested in the President of Barbados, and is exercised by the President on the advice of the prime minister and Cabinet, who together, form the government. Legislative power is vested in both the government and the two chambers of the Parliament. The political system is dominated by two main parties, the Barbados Labour Party and the Democratic Labour Party. The judiciary of Barbados is independent of the executive and the legislature. Jurisprudence is based on English common law.

Many of the country's legislative practices derive from the unwritten conventions of, and precedents set by, the United Kingdom's Westminster Parliament; however, Barbados has evolved variations.

== Summary of governmental organization ==
Name
Barbados

Type of government
Parliamentary democracy with a constitutional republic.

Capital
Bridgetown.

Administrative divisions
11 parishes: Christ Church, Saint Andrew, Saint George, Saint James, Saint John, Saint Joseph, Saint Lucy, Saint Michael, Saint Peter, Saint Philip, Saint Thomas; and the city of Bridgetown

Constitution
Westminster system, based on unwritten conventions and written legislation.

Legal system
English common law; accepts compulsory International Court of Justice jurisdiction, with reservations.

Suffrage
Citizens aged 18 years or older.

Participation in international organizations
CARICOM, CSME, CCJ, ACS, ICCt, ACP, Commonwealth of Nations, CDB, ECLAC, FAO, G-77, IADB, IBRD, ICAO, ICFTU, ICRM, IFAD, IFC, IFRCS, ILO, IMF, International Maritime Organization, Intelsat, Interpol, IOC, ISO, ITU, LAES, MIGA, NAM, OAS, OPANAL, UN, UNCTAD, UNESCO, UNIDO, UPU, WCO, WFTU, WHO, WIPO, WMO, WTrO.

Description of national flag
Three vertical panels – the outer panels of ultramarine and the centre panel of gold. A broken trident in black is the centre of the flag.

=== Executive power ===
Head of state
Jeffrey Bostic, President of Barbados (since 30 November 2025).

Head of government
Prime Minister Mia Mottley (since 25 May 2018).

Cabinet
Ministers chosen by the prime minister and appointed by the president's assent. Cabinet leads various ministries and agencies. Constitutionally, there must be at least five ministers, who may be appointed exclusively from within Parliament.

Elections
The president is indirectly elected by Parliament, by a two-thirds supermajority in each house, for a four-year term. In following legislative elections, the leader of the majority party in the House of Assembly is usually designated by the president to become prime minister.

== Government of Barbados ==
=== Head of state ===
The president of Barbados is the head of state and serves as the repository of executive power, as expressed in the Constitution: "The executive authority of Barbados is vested in the President." In practice, the president rarely exercises this power on his own volition due to the fact that the Constitution obliges the president to follow the advice of his ministers. As a consequence, the president is not held personally responsible for the decisions of the government.

=== Head of government ===
The prime minister is the head of government. The prime minister is appointed by the president of Barbados, but to ensure the continuity of a stable government this person will always be the one who has the confidence of the House of Assembly to lead the government. In practice, the position usually goes to the leader of the political party that has the most seats in the lower house. In no Barbadian election has a single party obtained less than an absolute majority in the House of Assembly (a situation which would have entailed the formation of a minority or coalition government).

The prime minister holds office until he resigns is effectively subject to a winning vote of no confidence or is removed by the president; therefore, the party that was in government before the election may attempt to continue to govern if they so desire, even if they hold fewer seats than another party. Coalition governments have never occurred.

Political parties are private organisations that are not mentioned in the constitution. The prime minister and the Cabinet are constitutionally required to be Members of Parliament so they can answer to Parliament for their actions. The prime minister selects ministers to head the various government departments and form a cabinet. The members of the Cabinet remain in office at the pleasure of the President.

If the Assembly passes a motion of no confidence in the government, the prime minister and the rest of Cabinet are expected either to resign their offices or to ask for Parliament to be dissolved so that a general election can be held. To avoid a non-confidence motion from passing, parties enforce strong party discipline, in which members of a party – especially from the ruling party – are strongly urged to vote the "party line" or face consequences. While a member of a governing party is free to vote their conscience, they are constrained by the fact that voting against the party line (especially in confidence votes) might lead to expulsion from their party. Such an expulsion would lead to loss of election funding and the former party backing an alternate candidate. While the government likes to keep control in these circumstances, in unwritten practice, the only time the government can fall is if a money bill (financial or budget) is defeated. However, if a government finds that it can not pass any legislation it is common (but not required) that a vote of confidence should be held. The exception is if the prime minister or the government declared that they consider a given bill to be a matter of confidence (hence how backbenchers are often held to strict party voting). Members can be elected as independents. Most independent members are elected under a party, but either chose to leave the party or are expelled from it.

When there are enough seats for another party to form a government after the resignation of a government, the president may ask the other party to try to form the government.

=== Legislative power ===
Barbados' Parliament consists of the President and a bicameral legislature: an elected House of Assembly and an appointed Senate. In practice, legislative power rests with the party that has the majority of seats in the House of Assembly, which is elected for a period not to exceed five years. The senate remains a body which is mainly filled by the decision of the official party in the role of being the ruling party, and the member(s) officially in the role of being an official opposition also submit a cadre for membership to the Senate as well.

=== Political parties and elections ===
Summary of the 2026 Barbadian General Election

Party	Votes	%	+/–	Seats	+/–
Barbados Labour Party	71,109	69.83	+0.57	30	0
Democratic Labour Party	27,808	27.31	+0.90	0	0
Friends of Democracy	1,424	1.40	New	0	New
People's Coalition for Progress	910	0.89	New	0	New
Bajan Free Party	161	0.16	-0.01	0	0
Independents	426	0.42		0	0
Total	101,838	100.00	–	30	0
Source: Barbados Today

The parishes of Barbados are usually further divided into one or more constituencies for candidates seeking election to the House of Assembly. As of 1967, there are no longer any Local Government Councils at the parish level, as issues such as schools, public works, government health facilities and other institutions are administered at the national level. However, local representatives to the House of Assembly will usually be responsible for local causes and may take up issues with the respective Ministers of the Crown.

There are two major and long-standing parties in Barbados: the Barbados Labour Party (BLP) and the Democratic Labour Party (DLP). The 1990s have seen the dissolution of a third party: the National Democratic Party (NDP), and in recent times the creation of other parties such as the People's Empowerment Party (PEP), United Progressive Party and the People's Party for Democracy and Development.

Despite initial historical disparity (the BLP was once conservative and the DLP liberal), their modern incarnations are all moderate and largely have no major ideological differences. Electoral contests and political disputes often have personal overtones and voter sway tends to be based on tradition. The major political problems facing Barbados today are in promoting economic growth: creating jobs, encouraging agricultural diversification, attracting small industry, and promoting tourism.

The BLP decisively returned to power, after the DLP ruled from 2008 to 2018, after winning 2018 Barbadian general election in May, 2018. The BLP won all 30 seats in the Parliament, leaving the DLP for the first time since its creation as an Extra-Parliamentary party, and Mia Mottley becoming the first female prime minister of Barbados. This historic landslide victory occurred again for the 2022 Barbadian general election with the BLP retaining power under the Mottley Administration, which was the first election following Barbados' transition to a republic.

In February 2026, prime minister Mia Mottley won her third consecutive election victory by landslide, meaning her Barbados Labour party won again all the 30 seats in the House of Assembly.

=== Party eras ===
- Democratic Labour Party (1966–1976)
- Barbados Labour Party (1976–1986)
- Democratic Labour Party (1986–1994)
- Barbados Labour Party (1994–2008)
- Democratic Labour Party (2008–2018)
- Barbados Labour Party (2018–present)

==== Political pressure groups ====
The main political pressure groups are:

- Barbados Workers Union; led by Leroy Trotman
- Clement Payne Labor Union; led by David Commissiong
- People's Progressive Movement; led by Eric Sealy
- Unity Workers Union; led by Caswell Franklin

== Judiciary ==
Barbados has an independent judiciary composed of Magistrates' Courts, which are statutorily authorized, and a Supreme Court, which is constitutionally mandated. The Supreme Court consists of the High Court and the Court of Appeal, each having four judges. The Chief Justice serves on both the high court and the court of appeal. The court of last resort is the Caribbean Court of Justice (CCJ) in Port of Spain, Trinidad and Tobago (which replaced the British-based Judicial Committee of the Privy Council). The CCJ's decisions are binding on all parties. Judges of the Supreme Court are appointed by the president on the recommendation of the prime minister after consultation with the leader of the opposition. Supreme Court of Judicature judges are appointed by the Service Commissions for the Judicial and Legal Service.

== See also ==
- Democracy in the Americas
- Future Centre Trust
