= Saint Michael South Central (Barbados Parliament constituency) =

Parliamentary constituency in Barbados

- Constituency for the House of Assembly of Barbados
- Region: Saint Michael, Barbados

Current constituency
- Created: 1971

Saint Michael South Central is a constituency in the Saint Michael parish of Barbados. It was established in 1971. Since 2022, it has been represented in the House of Assembly of the Barbadian Parliament by Marsha K. Caddle, a member of the BLP. (Note: As with all constituencies, the constituency elects one member of parliament (MP) by the first past the post system of election at least every five years.) The Saint Michael South Central constituency is a safe seat for the BLP.

== Boundaries ==
The constituency runs:

From the junction of Highway 6 (Collymore Rock-Bridgetown Road) with Martindales Road, along the middle of Martindales Road to its junction with Halls Road at the Mencea Cox Roundabout; thence along the middle of Halls Road to its junction with Tweedside Road and Hindsbury Road at the James A. Tudor Roundabout; thence along the middle of Hindsbury Road to its junction with Bank Hall Cross Road and Bridge Road; thence along the middle of Bridge Road to its junction with Welches Road; thence along the middle of Welches Road to its junction with Pine Hill Road; thence along the middle of Pine Hill Road to its junction with Pine Plantation Road; thence in a southerly direction along the middle of Pine Plantation Road to its junction with Highway 6; thence in an easterly direction along the middle of Highway 6 to its junction with Clapham Park Road; thence in a southerly direction along the middle of Clapham Park Road to its junction with Clapham Road; thence in a westerly direction along the middle of Clapham to its junction with Observatory Road; thence in a southerly and then south westerly direction along the middle of Observatory Road to its junction with Fordes Road; thence in a westerly direction along the middle of Fordes Road to its junction with Brittons New Road and Flagstaff Road; thence in a north westerly direction along the middle of Flagstaff to its junction with the entrance to the Storm Signal Station Compound; thence in a westerly direction along the entrance to the Storm Signal Station Compound to its junction with a pathway leading to the junction of Reece Road and Warners Gap; thence in a westerly direction along this pathway to the junction of Reece Road and Warners Gap; thence along the middle of Warners Gap to its junction with Beales Gap; thence along the middle of Beales Gap to Villa Road; thence in a southerly direction along the middle of Villa Road to its junction with Laynes Gap; thence in a westerly direction along the middle of Laynes Gap to its junction with Brittons Cross Road; thence in a northerly direction along the middle of Brittons Cross Road to its junction with Highway 6; thence in a westerly direction along the middle of Highway 6 to its junction with Martindales Road (the starting point).

== Members ==
Election	Member	Party
2018	Marsha K. Caddle	BLP
2022	Marsha K. Caddle	BLP

== Elections ==
=== 2022 ===
St. Michael South Central
Party	Candidate	Votes	%	±%
BLP	Marsha Caddle	1,936	63.2	−4.4
DLP	Richard Sealy	932	30.4	+4.6
APP	David Gill	195	6.4	+1.8
Majority		1,004	32.8	−9.0
Turnout		3,063		
BLP hold		Swing	-4.5	

=== 2018 ===
St. Michael South Central
Party	Candidate	Votes	%	±%
BLP	Marsha Caddle	2,881	67.6	+20.8
DLP	Richard Sealy	1,101	25.8	−27.3
UPP	David Gill	198	4.6	new
SB	Alan Springer	81	1.9	new
Majority		1,780	41.8	+35.5
Turnout		4,261		
BLP gain from DLP		Swing	+24.0	
