= Saint Michael South East (Barbados Parliament constituency) =

Parliamentary constituency in Barbados

- Constituency for the House of Assembly of Barbados
- Region: Saint Michael, Barbados

Current constituency
- Created: 1971

Saint Michael South East is a constituency in the Saint Michael parish of Barbados. It was established in 1971. Since 2022, it has been represented in the House of Assembly of the Barbadian Parliament by Santia Bradshaw, a member of the BLP. (Note: As with all constituencies, the constituency elects one member of parliament (MP) by the first past the post system of election at least every five years.) The Saint Michael South East constituency is a safe seat for the BLP.

== Boundaries ==
The constituency runs:

From the junction of Pine Plantation Road with Pine East-West Boulevard in an easterly direction along the middle of Pine East-West Boulevard to its junction with Errol Barrow Highway, thence in a northerly direction along the middle of Errol Barrow Highway to its junction with Highway 5 (Bridgetown-Mapp Hill Road) at the “Bussa” Roundabout; thence in an easterly direction along Highway 5 to its junction with Pasture Road; thence in a northerly direction along Pasture Road to its junction with Pasture Road-Haynes Hill Road; thence in an easterly direction along the Pasture Road-Haynes Hill Road to its junction with the Haynes Hill Road; thence in a northerly direction along Haynes Hill Road to its junction with Monroe Road; thence in a westerly direction along Monroe Road to its junction with Roberts Road; thence in a northerly direction along Roberts Road to its junction with Highway 4 (Bridgetown-Buckeley Road); thence in an easterly direction along Highway 4 to its junction with the Roundabout at Constant and Dash Valley Road; thence in an southerly direction along Dash Valley Road, then along the middle of Dash Valley Road to its junction with Highway 5 (Bridgetown-Mapp Hill Road); thence in an easterly direction along the middle of Highway 5 to its junction with Egerton-St. Davids Road, thence in a southerly direction along the middle of Egerton-St. Davids Road to its junction with St. Davids-Kent-Wildey Road; thence in a westerly direction along the middle of St. Davids-Kent-Wildey Road to its junction with Errol Barrow Highway; thence in a southerly direction along the middle of Errol Barrow Highway to its junction with Highway 6 (Sargeant’s Village-Collymore Rock Road); thence in a westerly direction along the middle of Highway 6 to its junction with Pine Plantation Road; thence in a northerly direction along the middle of Pine Plantation Road to its junction with Pine East-West Boulevard (the starting point).

== Members ==
Election	Member	Party
2018	Santia Bradshaw	BLP
2022	Santia Bradshaw	BLP

== Elections ==
=== 2022 ===
St. Michael South East
Party	Candidate	Votes	%	±%
BLP	Santia Bradshaw	2,786	76.0	+0.4
DLP	Pedro Shepherd	699	19.1	−2.7
APP	Patrick Tannis	180	4.9	+4.4
Majority		2,087	56.9	+3.2
Turnout		3,665		
BLP hold		Swing	+1.5	

=== 2018 ===
St. Michael South East
Party	Candidate	Votes	%	±%
BLP	Santia Bradshaw	3,803	75.6	+25.5
DLP	Rodney Grant	1,099	21.8	−28.1
SB	Arlene Bourne	105	2.1	new
UPP	Veronica Price	26	0.5	new
Majority		2,704	53.7	+53.5
Turnout		5,033		
BLP hold		Swing	+26.8	
