= Christopher Gibbs (politician) =

Barbadian politician

Member of the House of Assembly of Barbados for Saint Michael West
- Incumbent
- Assumed office 19 January 2022
- Preceded by: Joseph Atherley

Personal details
- Party: Barbados Labour Party

Christopher G. L. Gibbs is a Barbadian politician from the Barbados Labour Party (BLP).

== Political career ==
In the 2022 Barbadian general election, was elected in Saint Michael West succeeding Joseph Atherley. In 2025, he was appointed Minister of Housing, Lands and Maintenance.
