= Saint James South (Barbados Parliament constituency) =

Parliamentary constituency in Barbados

- Constituency for the House of Assembly of Barbados
- Region: Saint James, Barbados

Current constituency
- Created: 1981

Saint James South is a constituency in the Saint James parish of Barbados. It was established in 1981. Since 2018, it has been represented in the House of Assembly of the Barbadian Parliament by Sandra Husbands, a member of the BLP. (Note: As with all constituencies, the constituency elects one member of parliament (MP) by the first past the post system of election at least every five years.) The Saint James South constituency is a safe seat for the BLP.

== Boundaries ==
The constituency runs:

From a point where the Prospect-Appleby-Derricks Ridge touches the University Drive, Cave Hill; thence in an easterly direction along the middle of the University Drive to its junction with the Cave Hill-Hinds Hill-Husbands Road; thence in a northerly direction along the middle of the Husbands Road to its junction with the Husbands-Clermont Road; thence in an easterly direction along the middle of the Husbands-Clermont Road to its junction with the Ronald Mapp Highway; thence in a northerly direction along the middle of the Ronald Mapp Highway to its junction with the Redmans Village-Prior Park Road; thence in a westerly direction along the middle of the Prior Park Road to the Prior Park Roundabout; thence in a southerly and then south westerly direction along the middle of the Prior Park Road to its junction with the Prior Park Gardens Road; thence in a westerly direction along the middle of the Prior Park Gardens Road to a track on the southern side of Lot #18 to its junction with Denny’s Road; thence in a westerly direction along the middle of Denny’s Road to its junction with Thorpes Road; thence in a northerly direction along the middle of Thorpes Road to its junction with the Holders Hill Road; thence in a westerly direction along the middle of the Holders Hill Road to a point at the base of the Derrick-Appleby Ridge; thence in a southerly direction along the Derrick-Appleby-Prospect Ridge to the point where it touches the University Drive, Cave Hill (the starting point)..

== Members ==
Election	Member	Party
2018	Sandra Husbands	BLP
2022	Sandra Husbands	BLP

== Elections ==
=== 2022 ===
St. James South
Party	Candidate	Votes	%	±%
BLP	Sandra Husbands	2,879	63.8	−4.3
DLP	Ronnie Yearwood	1,633	36.2	+7.8
Majority		1,246	27.6	−12.1
Turnout		4,512		
BLP hold		Swing	-6.0	

=== 2018 ===
St. James South
Party	Candidate	Votes	%	±%
BLP	Sandra Husbands	4,012	68.1	+24.7
DLP	Donville Inniss	1,674	28.4	−28.1
SB	Jacqueline Alleyne-Worrell	103	1.7	new
UPP	Christal Austin	101	1.7	new
Majority		2,338	39.7	+26.6
Turnout		5,890		
BLP gain from DLP		Swing	+26.4	
