= Joseph Atherley =

Barbadian pastor and politician (born 1954)

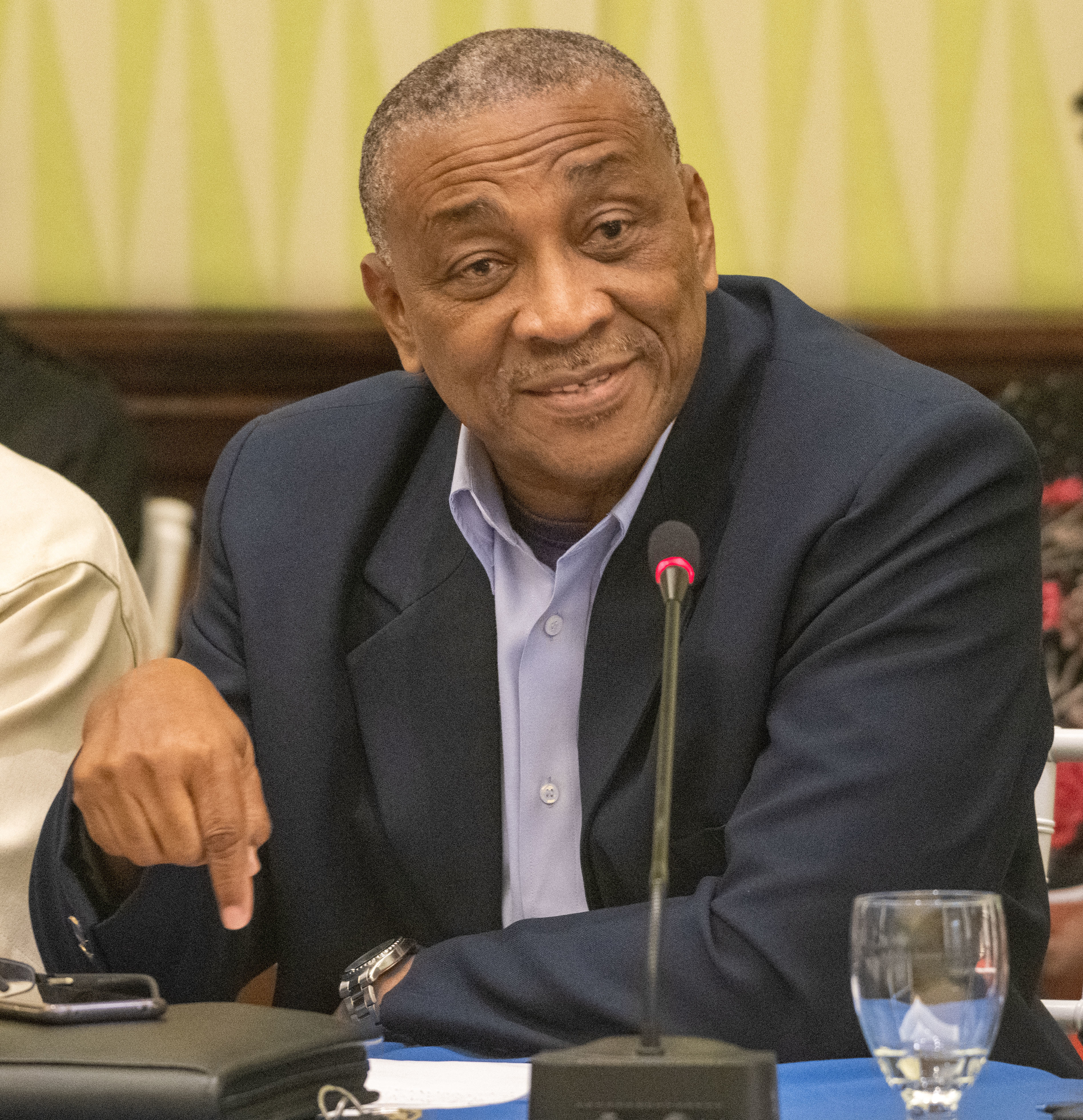
- Atherley in 2020

Leader of the People's Party for Democracy and Development
- Incumbent
- Assumed office 8 June 2019
- Preceded by: Party established

Leader of the Opposition
- In office 1 June 2018 – 19 January 2022
- Prime Minister: Mia Mottley
- Preceded by: Mia Mottley
- Succeeded by: Ralph Thorne (2024)

Member of Parliament for Saint Michael West
- In office 5 June 2018 – 27 December 2021
- Preceded by: Michael A. Carrington
- Succeeded by: Christopher Gibbs
- In office 16 February 1999 – 12 February 2008
- Preceded by: Branford Taitt
- Succeeded by: Michael A. Carrington

Personal details
- Born: Joseph Junior Sylvester Atherley; 26 February 1954 (age 72) Barbados
- Party: People's Party for Democracy and Development
- Other political affiliations: Barbados Labour Party (Until 2018); Independent (2018–2019); Alliance Party for Progress (2021–present)

Joseph Junior Sylvester Atherley (born 26 February 1954) is a Barbadian religious minister and politician who served as Leader of the Opposition in the House of Assembly of Barbados from 2018 to 2022, and as leader of the People's Party for Democracy and Development since 8 June 2019.

Atherley was elected in 2018 as a candidate of the Barbados Labour Party (BLP). As the BLP won all seats in the election, Atherley resigned from the party to serve as parliamentary opposition. He was previously an MP for the BLP from 16 February 1999 to 12 February 2008, where he was the first Christian clergyman to be elected to the House of Assembly since independence.

== Early life ==
Born on 26 February 1954 in Barbados, Atherley received his early education at the Federal High School. He later studied at the Christian Union Church of the West Indies Bible College, Chapel Christian University (USA), the University of the West Indies at Cave Hill, and the Haggai Institute of Leadership Training in Singapore. Atherley serves as Senior Minister of the Better Life Assembly and is a member of the Evangelical Holiness Christian Community. He is also the Barbados regional head of the Christian Union Church of the West Indies.

Atherley is married to Esther Hinds-Atherley. He has two sons.

== Politics ==
As a member of the Barbados Labour Party (BLP), Atherley first entered Parliament in the 1999 elections. He was elected from the Saint Michael West constituency, defeating Branford Taitt of the Democratic Labour Party (DLP). Atherley was the first Christian minister to be elected to Parliament. He was re-elected in 2003 by a slightly smaller margin against the DLP's Michael A. Carrington. During his time in Parliament, Atherley was Parliamentary Secretary in the Attorney General's Office and Home Office, and Minister of State in the Prime Minister's Office under Owen Arthur. He also served as First Vice Chairman of the BLP from 2004 to 2005. Atherley sought to retain his seat in the 2008 election, but was defeated this time by Carrington. He returned as a BLP candidate in 2013, but lost to Carrington.

In the 2018 elections, Atherley won back the St. Michael West seat. The BLP won all the seats in the House of Assembly; no party had done so since independence. On 25 May 2018, BLP leader Mia Mottley was sworn in as Barbados' first female prime minister.

On 31 May, less than a week after the swearing-in of the new government, Atherley informed the prime minister of his intention to leave the BLP and become an independent parliamentarian. Due to the absence of other non-BLP MPs in Parliament, Atherley was sworn in the next day as Leader of the Opposition, which entitled him to receive the parliamentary prerogatives of the office, an increased annual salary of BB$129,000, and the power to advise on the appointment of the two minority representatives in the Senate.

On 8 June 2019, Atherley announced the formation of the People's Party for Democracy and Development (PdP) as the new main opposition party under his leadership. His appointed senators Crystal Drakes and Caswell Franklyn were members as well.

Atherley did not stand for re-election to his parliamentary seat of St. Michael West in the snap election called in 2022, and his seat was won back by the Barbados Labour Party.

Parliament of Barbados
Preceded by Branford Taitt	Member of Parliament for Saint Michael West; 1999–2008	Succeeded by Michael A. Carrington
Preceded by Michael A. Carrington	Member of Parliament for Saint Michael West; 2018–2021	Succeeded by Christopher Gibbs
Political offices
Preceded by Mia Mottley	Leader of the Opposition; 2018–2022	Vacant
Party political offices
Party established	Leader of the People's Party for Democracy and Development; 2019–present	Incumbent
Party established	Leader of the Alliance Party for Progress; 2021–present	Incumbent
