= Verla De Peiza =

Barbadian politician (born 1971)

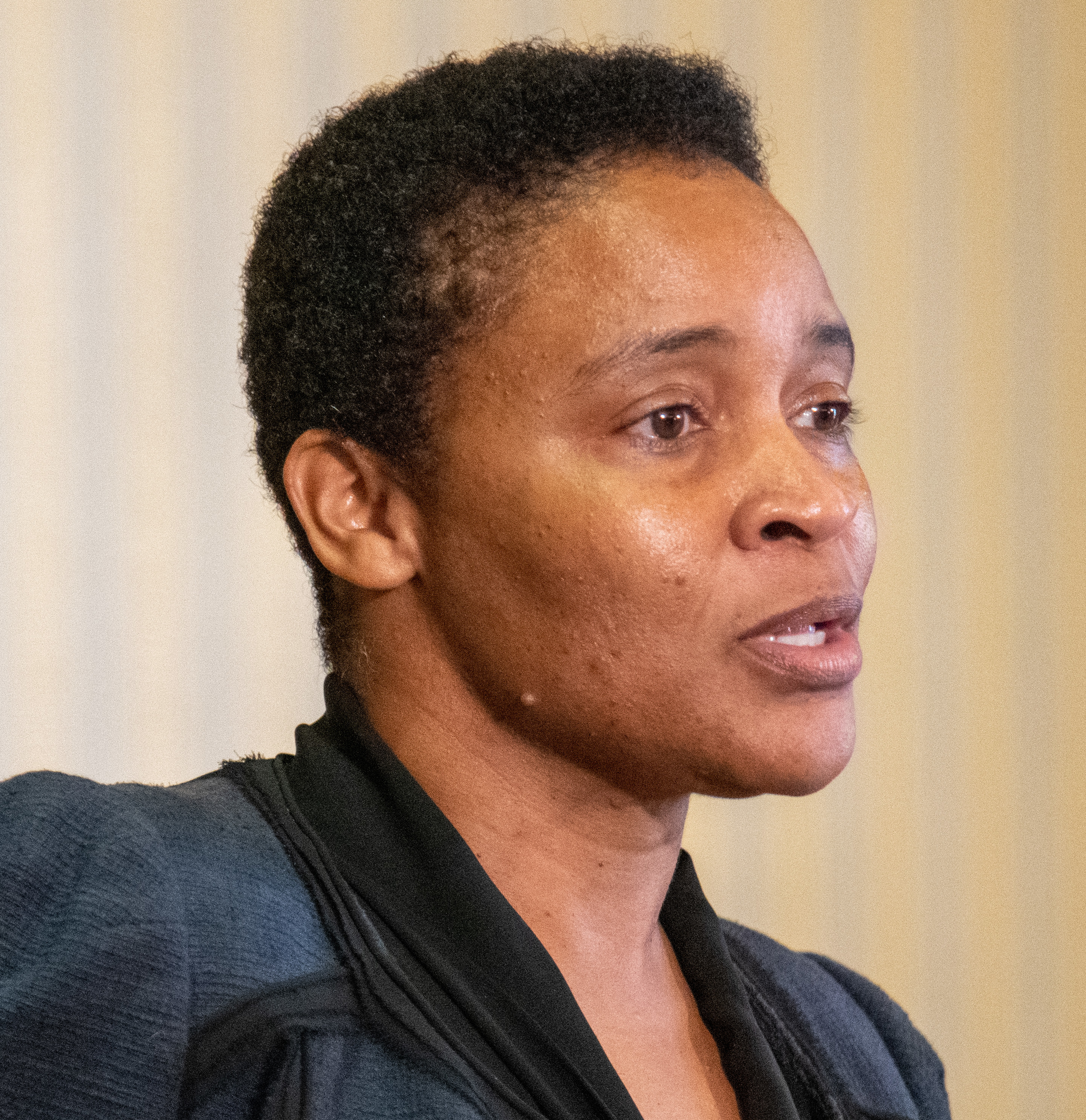
- De Peiza in 2020

Leader of the Democratic Labour Party
- In office 12 August 2018 – 21 January 2022
- Preceded by: Freundel Stuart
- Succeeded by: Ronnie Yearwood

Personal details
- Born: 7 October 1971 (age 55) Saint James, Barbados
- Party: Democratic Labour
- Occupation: Politician; Lawyer

Verla A. De Peiza (born 7 October 1971) is a Barbadian politician and lawyer. She was the leader of the Democratic Labour Party (DLP) from 12 August 2018 to 21 January 2022, and was the first woman to hold this position. She also previously served as a Senator for the DLP from 2010 to 2018.

== Early life ==
Verla De Peiza was born on 7 October 1971 in the parish of Saint James, Barbados. She studied at Erdiston Primary School and Harrison College, winning a Barbados Exhibition university scholarship in 1991. She attended the University of Southampton, graduating with a 2:1 BSc in the fields of Politics and Law. She then entered Queen Mary University of London and completed a Master of Laws with Merit, specialising in Criminology and Criminal Justice. In 1996, De Peiza became qualified to practise law in England and Wales. Upon returning to Barbados, she joined the law firm Charlton Chambers and was called to the bar in 2000.

== Political career ==
In 1996, De Peiza joined the Democratic Labour Party (DLP). In the 2008 general election, she was nominated as one of the DLP's campaign managers. In 2010, De Peiza was appointed as a Senator, then reappointed after the 2013 Barbadian general election. She served until 2018. In the 2018 general election, she ran in the Christ Church West constituency, a Barbados Labour Party stronghold, but was unsuccessful . On 12 August 2018, she was elected unopposed as the new DLP president after former Prime Minister and DLP president Freundel Stuart stepped down, making her the party's first female leader. In August 2021, she was challenged by fellow DLP member Guy Hewitt for the party leadership, but prevailed in an internal vote. After losing the 2022 Barbadian general election which resulted in the DLP not regaining any seats in the House of Assembly, she resigned on 21 January 2022.

Party political offices
Preceded by Freundel Stuart	Leader of the Democratic Labour Party; 2018–2022	Succeeded by Ronnie Yearwood
