= Saint Philip West (Barbados Parliament constituency) =

Parliamentary constituency in Barbados

- Constituency for the House of Assembly of Barbados
- Region: Saint Philip, Barbados

Current constituency
- Created: 2003

Saint Philip West is a constituency in the Saint Philip parish of Barbados. It was established in 2003. Since 2022, it has been represented in the House of Assembly of the Barbadian Parliament by Kay McConney, a member of the BLP. (Note: As with all constituencies, the constituency elects one member of parliament (MP) by the first past the post system of election at least every five years.) The Saint Philip West constituency is a marginal seat for the BLP.

== Boundaries ==
The constituency runs:

From a point on the coast south of Monument (B.17) placed at the edge of the cliff and east of the Airport boundary fence; thence in a northerly direction to Monument (B.17); thence in a northerly, westerly and northerly direction along a track leading to Highway 7 (the Rock Hall-Spencers Road), thence in a easterly direction along Highway 7 to its junction with Highway 5B (the Six Roads-Kirtons Road); thence along Highway 5B to its junction with Kirtons-Mangrove Road; thence in a westerly direction along Mangrove Road to its junction with Highway N (the Oldbury Road); thence in a north easterly direction to its junction with Highway 5B (the Six Roads-Four Roads-Kirtons Road); thence in a north-westerly direction to its junction with Six Cross Roads Roundabout; thence in an easterly direction along Highway 5 (the Carrington-Ruby Road) to its junction with Beulah Corner and Highway M (the Beulah-Bushy Park Road); thence along the middle of Highway M to its junction with Bushy Park-Harrow Road; thence along the middle of Bushy Park Road-Harrow Road to its junction with Marchfield-St. Philip Church Road; thence in a northerly direction along the middle of Marchfield-St. Philip Church Road to its junction with Church Village-Thickets Road; thence in a westerly direction to its junction with Cox Hill; thence in a northerly direction along the middle of Cox Hill to the junction at Hillview, thence along the middle of Hillview Road in a south westerly direction to monument (B.14), then generally westward to a point which is marked by Monument (B.13); thence in a westerly direction along a line joining this to a point in the gully running from Woodland, marked by Monument (B.12); thence in a southerly direction along this gully to the point at which it is crossed by Highway 4B (the Frenches-Chapel Road); thence in a westerly direction along the middle of Highway 4B to its junction with an unclassified road leading to Edgecumbe; thence in a southerly direction along this unclassified road to its junction with the Edgecumbe-Ebenezer Road; thence in a southerly direction along the middle of the Edgecumbe-Ebenezer Road to its junction with Highway 5 (Bridgetown-Windsor Road); thence along Highway 5 to its junction with Lower Greys-Boarded Hall-South District Road; thence in a southerly direction along Lower Greys-Dayrells Hill Road to its junction with Highway R (the Pilgrim-Ridge Road); thence along the middle of Highway R to its junction with the ABC Highway; thence along the middle of the ABC Highway to a point near light pole #499; thence in a southerly direction in a straight line to its junction with the Fairy Valley Road; thence in an easterly direction along the middle of the Fairy Valley Road to its junction with the Seawell House-Paragon Road; thence along the middle of the Seawell House-Paragon Road to a straight line leading to a point on the Sea Coast south of Paragon House; thence in an easterly direction along the sea coast to a point on the coast south of the Monument (B.17) (the starting point).

== Members ==
Election	Member	Party
2018	John King	BLP
2022	Kay McConney	BLP

== Elections ==
=== 2022 ===
St. Philip West
Party	Candidate	Votes	%	±%
BLP	Kay McConney	2,580	50.1	−16.8
DLP	David Estwick	2,140	41.5	+11.7
APP	Lynette Eastmond	328	6.4	New
SB	Karina Goodridge	104	2.0	−1.3
Majority		440	8.5	−28.6
Turnout		5,152		
BLP hold		Swing	-14.2	

=== 2018 ===
St. Philip West
Party	Candidate	Votes	%	±%
BLP	John King	4,323	66.9	+28.6
DLP	David Estwick	1,924	29.8	−31.9
SB	Leighton Greenidge	212	3.3	new
Majority		2,399	37.1	+13.9
Turnout		6,459		
BLP gain from DLP		Swing	+30.2	
