= Bajan Free Party =

- Abbreviation: BFP
- Leader: Alex Mitchell
- Founded: October 2012
- Ideology: Government transparency Anti-corruption
- Colors: Black

Election symbol
- Trident

Website
- Facebook page

The Bajan Free Party is a minor political party in Barbados. It was formed on 1 October 2012 by Alex Mitchell and first contested the 2013 Barbadian general election under an electoral alliance called the Coalition of United Parties (CUP) with other minor parties such as the Kingdom Government of Barbados, and the People's Democratic Congress where it failed to win a seat. The CUP later contested the 2018 Barbadian general election adding the Barbados Integrity Movement to its coalition where after the CUP disbanded. Its political platform focuses on government transparency and Anti-corruption.

== Election results ==
Election	Leader	Votes	%	Seats	+/–	Position	Status
2013	Alex Mitchell	50	0.03	0 / 30	0	▲4th	Extra-parliamentary
2018	Alex Mitchell	103	0.07	0 / 30	0	▼6th	Extra-parliamentary
2022	Alex Mitchell	191	0.17	0 / 30	0	▲5th	Extra-parliamentary

== See also ==
- Politics of Barbados
- Elections in Barbados
