= People's Coalition for Progress =

Electoral alliance in Barbados

- Abbreviation: PCP
- Leader: Carolyn Clarke; Lynette Eastmond; Corey Beckles
- Founders: Kemar Stuart Lynette Eastmond Corey Beckles
- Founded: 19 January 2026
- Ideology: Social democracy Progressivism Conservatism Multiculturalism
- Political position: Centre-left to Center-right
- Colours: Green, Orange and Purple

The People's Coalition for Progress (PCP) is an electoral alliance in Barbados. It was formed on the 19 January 2026 by the United Progressive Party (UPP), the New National Party (NNP) and the Conservative Barbados Leadership Party (CBLP) to contest the 2026 Barbadian general election.

== History ==
The United Progressive Party was formed in 2017 and Lynette Eastmond was chosen to lead the new party after much media speculation, concerning the political ambitions of Eastmond herself. The UPP later contested the 2018 Barbadian general election the next year but only won 1.3 per cent of the vote losing the one seat of Christ Church West, held by new UPP's member, Dr. Agard back to the Barbados Labour Party (BLP). They then contested the 2022 Barbadian general election under the Alliance Party for Progress (APP) Banner with the People's Party for Democracy and Development and failed to win any seats.

In January 2025, attorney-at-law Corey Beckles founded the Conservative Barbados Leadership Party (CBLP) on the "principal values of conservatism."

The New National Party (NNP) was founded by activist and former general secretary of the Democratic Labour Party (DLP) Kemar Stuart on the 4 April 2025. It was founded after Stuart was dismissed from his role after former Barbados Labour Party MP Ralph Thorne crossed the floor and became leader of the opposition and of the DLP. The party originally intended to contest the 2025 St. James North by-election but later declined to focus on the next general election.

On 17 January 2026, Prime Minister of Barbados Mia Mottley called for a new general election to be held less than a month away on 11 February of the same year. That same month, the 3 parties announced an electoral coalition called the People's Coalition for Progress (PCP) on the 19 January 2026, to contest the election and stated several of their political positions such as electoral reform and anti-corruption. It was also stated that after the election the 3 parties would discuss who would be elected as prime minister if successful. On 27 January 2026, which was nomination day, the PCP nominated 12 candidates.

The PCP, along with the DLP, later criticised the Barbados Labour Party-led government and the Electoral and Boundaries Commission over its handling of the voting lists. Mottley in response refuted these claims and invited authorities from the Caribbean Community (CARICOM) and Commonwealth of Nations to act as official election observers. She stated this decision was made in a bid to “protect the reputation of Barbados.”

== Election results ==
Election	Leader	Votes	%	Seats	+/–	Position	Government
2026	Kemar Stuart; Lynette Eastmond; Corey Beckles	910	0.89%	0 / 30	New	4th	Extra-parliamentary

== See also ==
- United Progressive Party
- Conservative Barbados Leadership Party
- New National Party
- List of political parties in Barbados
