= Santia Bradshaw =

Barbadian politician

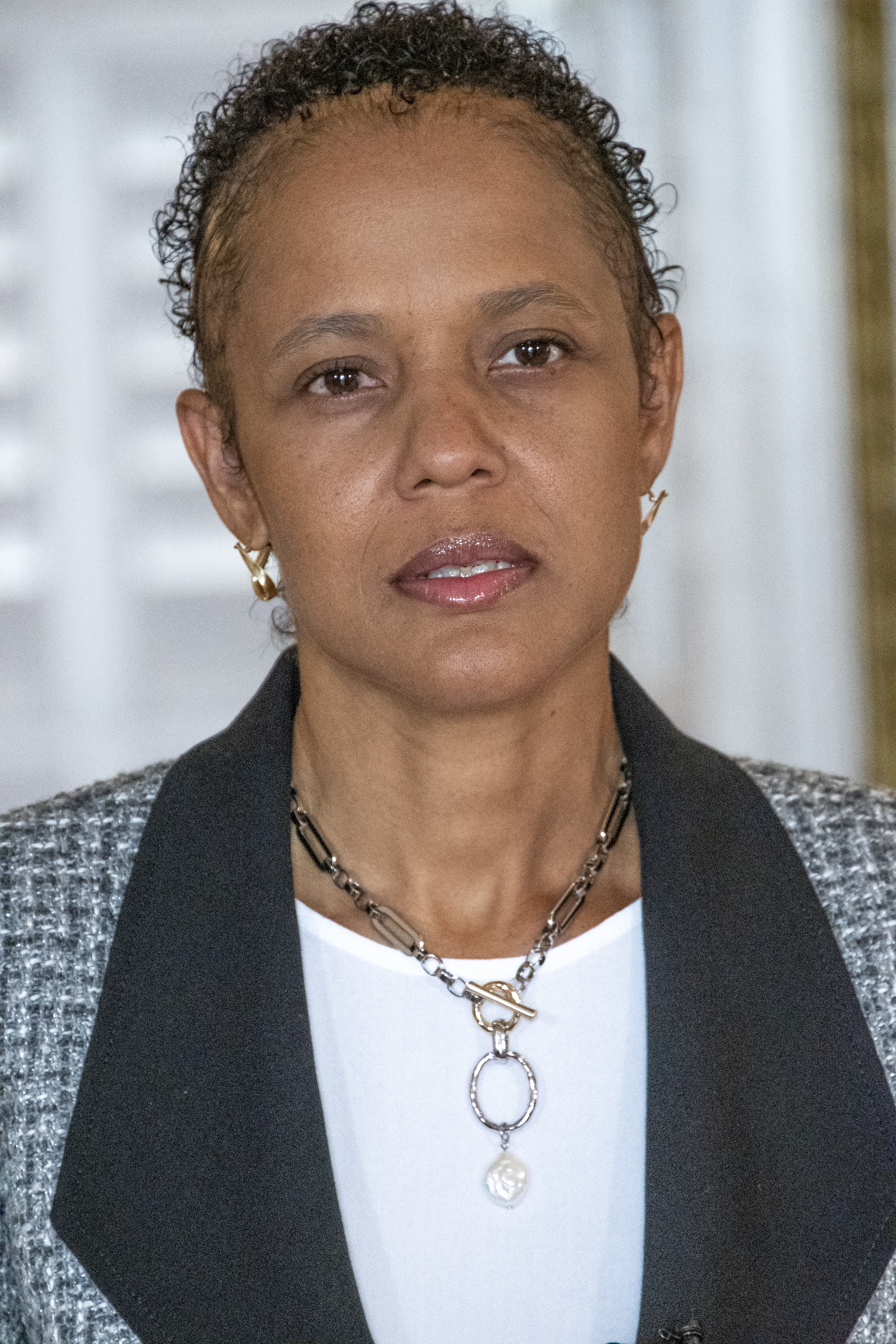
- Bradshaw in 2020

9th Deputy Prime Minister of Barbados
- Incumbent
- Assumed office 26 January 2022
- Prime Minister: Mia Mottley
- Preceded by: Freundel Stuart (2010)

Minister of Education, Technological and Vocational Training
- In office 26 May 2018 – 26 January 2022
- Prime Minister: Mia Mottley
- Preceded by: Ronald Jones
- Succeeded by: Kay McConney

Member of the House of Assembly for Saint Michael South East
- Incumbent
- Assumed office 21 February 2013

Personal details
- Born: 13 March 1976 (age 50)
- Party: Barbados Labour Party

Santia Josette Omara Bradshaw, MP (born 13 March 1976) is a Barbadian politician and attorney who has been serving as Deputy Prime Minister of Barbados since 2022.

== Early life and career ==
Santia Josette Omara Bradshaw was born on 13 March 1976. She is the daughter of former MP DeLisle Bradshaw. She studied Law at the University of Huddersfield. Afterwards, Bradshaw practised law in Barbados before entering politics. She was also the managing director of Pyramid Entertainment.

In 2010, Bradshaw was appointed by the Leader of the Opposition to the Senate of Barbados. On 9 November 2010, she was sworn in to office. In February 2013, she was elected to the Barbados House of Assembly representing Saint Michael South-East constituency. Between 2006 and 2008, she was an Honorary Secretary of the Barbados Bar Association. On 24 May 2018, after the 2018 general elections, she retained her seat as a member of the House of Assembly of Barbados and was appointed Minister of Education, Technological and Vocational Training. She stated her goals as minister were to strengthen and re-organise the Ministry of Education, provide more access to technology for schools, and expand technical and vocational training among other things.

In March 2020, she was appointed acting prime minister of Barbados after Mia Mottley was on leave for medical procedures.

Bradshaw was named deputy prime minister by Mia Mottley in January 2022 and was officially sworn in on 26 January 2022. She is the first officially named Deputy Prime Minister of Barbados since Freundel Stuart 12 years prior. She has urged the community in this role to support Barbados' youth to combat crime and said the nation was on the brink.

== Personal life ==
In August 2018 she was diagnosed with breast cancer, which she first noticed after the 2018 general elections. She underwent treatment at Baptist Health Miami Cancer Center, and eventually went into remission.
