= Ryan Walters (Barbadian politician) =

Barbadian politician

Member of the Senate of Barbados
- Incumbent
- Assumed office 20 February 2026
- Prime Minister: Mia Mottley

Personal details
- Party: Democratic Labour Party

Ryan Walters is a Barbadian politician from the Democratic Labour Party (DLP) who is an opposition member of the Senate of Barbados.

In the 2026 Barbadian general election, he was the unsuccessful DLP candidate in the Saint Michael North West constituency.
