= Michael A. Carrington =

Barbadian politician (born 1959)

Michael A. Carrington (born 9 March 1959) is a Barbadian politician. He is a former Speaker of the House of Assembly of Barbados from 2008 to 2018.

== Early life and education ==
Michael Carrington was born on 9 March 1959 in Bayville, St. Michael. Michael attended Bay Primary and Wesley Hall Boys' where he obtained his first school living certificate. Immediately after his primary education he studied at University of the West Indies and Hugh Wooding Law School where he studied law and was called to the Barbados Bar Association as a lawyer in 1989.

== Career ==
Between 1999 until 2008 Carrington had run for the House of Assembly of Barbados unsuccessfully for 3 consecutive times. In the 2008 Barbadian general election, he was finally elected into the House of Assembly of Barbados and sworn in as Speaker of the house. After serving 5 years in office, in 2018 he ran for re-election was failed to get elected. He has served as a member of the Disciplinary Committee of the Barbados Bar Association.
