= Friends of Democracy =

The Friends of Democracy
- Abbreviation: FOD
- Leader: Karina Goodridge
- President: Karina Goodridge
- Chairperson: Karina Goodridge
- General Secretary: Steve Blackett
- Founder: Ronnie Yearwood; Steve Blackett
- Founded: 2024 (As a political pressure group); July 1, 2025 (As a political party)
- Split from: Democratic Labour Party
- Ideology: Social democracy
- Political position: Centre-left
- Colors: Green
- House of Assembly: 0 / 30
- Senate: 1 / 21

Election symbol
- Diamond

The Friends of Democracy (FOD) is a center-left social democratic political party in Barbados. It was established in 2024 as a political pressure group and in 2025 as a political party.

== History ==
The Friends of Democracy was founded as a political pressure and civic group in 2024 after the ousting of Democratic Labour Party (DLP) president Ronnie Yearwood and general secretary Steve Blackett and subsequent exodus of some ex-DLP members following an internal power struggle. The group later elected attorney Karina Goodridge as its chairman and President on 18 May 2025 and announced its intention to become a full political party. The party was founded on 1 July 2025 where it announced that Yearwood was no longer affiliated with the group.

On 23 January 2026, FOD announced that it was going to contest the 2026 Barbadian general election with 12 candidates with the intent to " a strong, vibrant and potent opposition. ” Weeks later, on the 11th of February, during the election, they won 1,424 votes and came 3rd place but failed to win a seat.

On 20 February 2026 President Jeffrey Bostic appointed FOD President Karina Goodridge and DLP member Ryan Walters as the two opposition senators for the opposition seats in the senate.

== Electoral Performance ==
Election	Party Leader	Votes	%	Seats	+/–	Position	Government
2026	Karina Goodridge	1,424	1.40	0 / 30	0	New	Extra-parliamentary

== See also ==
- Politics of Barbados
- Elections in Barbados
