= 2022 Barbadian general election =

- 19 January 2022

All 30 seats in the House of Assembly 16 seats needed for a majority
- Turnout: 42.97% (▼16.59pp)
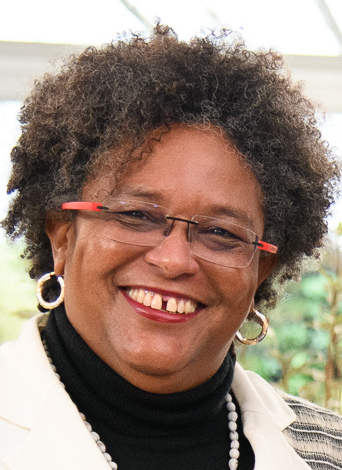

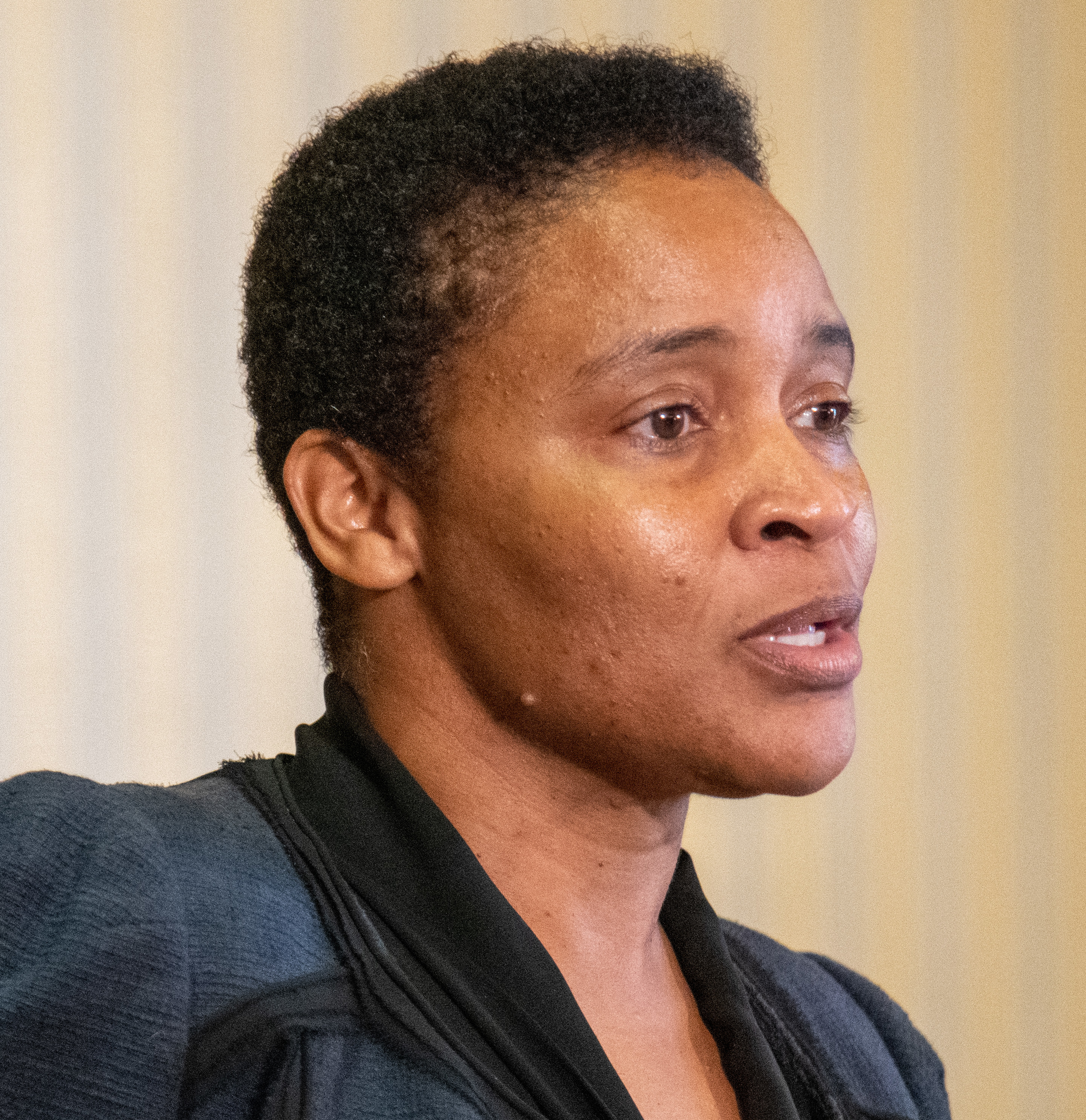
	First party	Second party
Leader	Mia Mottley	Verla De Peiza
Party	BLP	DLP
Leader since	26 February 2013	12 August 2018
Leader's seat	St. Michael North East	Ran in St. Lucy (lost)
Last election	73.47%, 30 seats	21.8%, 0 seats
Seats won	30	0
Seat change	Steady	Steady
Popular vote	78,960	30,112
Percentage	69.26%	26.41%
Swing	▼4.17pp	▲3.77pp
- Results by constituency
Prime Minister before election
Mia Mottley
BLP
Elected Prime Minister
Mia Mottley
BLP

General elections were held in Barbados on 19 January 2022 to elect the 30 members of the House of Assembly. The ruling Barbados Labour Party won all 30 seats for the second consecutive election.

This was the 12th national election held since independence from the United Kingdom in 1966, the 16th since the institution of universal suffrage in 1951, and the first since Barbados became a republic in 2021. For the first time, both the ruling Barbados Labour Party and its historical rival, the Democratic Labour Party, were led by women. Voter turnout was 42.97%, making it the first time after universal suffrage that turnout for a general election was less than half and the lowest turnout on record.

== Background ==
According to the Constitution of Barbados, the Parliament shall stand dissolved no later than every five years from the first sitting of Parliament. The previous general elections were held on 24 May 2018, and the first sitting of the new session of Parliament was held on 5 June 2018. After the dissolution of Parliament, the President of Barbados must issue a writ for a general election of members to the House of Assembly and for appointment of Senators to the Senate within 90 days.

Despite a commanding 29–1 BLP majority in the House of Assembly and elections not being required until 2023, on 27 December 2021 Prime Minister Mia Mottley announced that an early election would be held on 19 January the following year. Mottley's announcement came within a month of the country becoming a republic. She described the election as a "refuelling stop" for the nation, while opposition leaders criticised the early election as an attempt by her to consolidate power.

On 30 December 2021 Joseph Atherley, who served as the official Leader of the Opposition of the House of Assembly and leader of the People's Party for Democracy and Development, announced an alliance with the United Progressive Party for the election under the name Alliance Party for Progress (APP).

Early voting was held for police officers and election day workers on 12 January.

On 18 January, Philip Catlyn, a member of the Barbados Sovereignty Party (BSP), filed for an injunction against the President and the Attorney General to stop the election. He argued that the home isolation requirements for those testing positive for COVID-19 would prevent close to 5,000 people from voting. Barbados does not allow absentee voting. After hearing the legal arguments, High Court justice Cicely Chase dismissed the case as being out of her jurisdiction. She said that the case should have been filed in an election court.

== Electoral system ==
The 30 members of the House of Assembly are elected by first-past-the-post voting in single-member constituencies.

== Candidates ==
Seven political parties nominated candidates for this election. Including nine independents, there were a total of 108 candidates.

=== Parties ===
Party	Position	Ideology	Leader	Leader since	Leader's seat	2018 election		Seats at dissolution	Contested seats
Party	Position	Ideology	Leader	Leader since	Leader's seat	%	Seats	Seats at dissolution	Contested seats
Barbados Labour Party	Centre-left	Social democracy Republicanism	Mia Mottley	26 February 2013	St. Michael North East	73.47	30	29	30 seats
Democratic Labour Party	Centre-left	Social democracy Republicanism	Verla De Peiza	12 August 2018	Standing in St. Lucy	21.82	0	0	30 seats
Alliance Party for Progress (PdP–UPP)	Centre-left	Social democracy Christian left	Joseph Atherley	30 December 2021	St. Michael West; Standing in St. Michael Central	1.24	0	1	20 seats
Solutions Barbados	Centre	Third Way	Grenville Phillips II	1 July 2015	None	2.45	0	0	11 seats
Bajan Free Party		Government transparency Anti-corruption	Alex Mitchell	1 October 2012	Standing in St. Michael South	0.07	0	0	4 seats
New Barbados Kingdom Alliance		Apostolic Governance	Apostle Lynroy Scantlebury	July 2017	Standing in St Peter	New party		0	2 seats
Barbados Sovereignty Party			Michael Thompson		Standing in St. Peter	New party		0	2 seats

=== Independents ===
Name	Contested Constituency
Melissa Taitt	St George North
Omar Smith	St Philip North
Wayne Beckles	St Philip North
Buddy Larrier	Christ Church South
Donald Leacock	Christ Church South
Brian Talma	Christ Church East
Samuel Maynard	St Thomas
Erskine Alleyne	St James Central
Joseph Jordan	St James Central

== Results ==
Party	Votes	%	+/–	Seats	+/–
Barbados Labour Party	78,960	69.26	–4.21	30	0
Democratic Labour Party	30,112	26.41	+3.77	0	0
Alliance Party for Progress	3,090	2.71	New	0	0
Solutions Barbados	784	0.69	–1.76	0	0
Bajan Free Party	191	0.17	+0.10	0	0
New Barbados Kingdom Alliance	122	0.11	New	0	New
Barbados Sovereignty Party	120	0.11	New	0	New
Independents	634	0.56	–0.10	0	0
Total	114,013	100.00	–	30	0
Valid votes	114,013	99.62			
Invalid/blank votes	434	0.38			
Total votes	114,447	100.00			
Registered voters/turnout	266,339	42.97			
Source: Barbados Parliament

=== Results by constituency ===
Source for votes:

==== Christ Church East ====
Christ Church East
Party	Candidate	Votes	%	±%
BLP	Wilfred Abrahams	3,302	73.7	−0.2
DLP	Denis Lowe	958	21.4	−1.1
APP	Victor Knight	80	1.8	+0.9
SB	Pauline Corbin	79	1.8	−0.9
Independent	Brian Talma	60	1.3	New
Majority		2,344	52.3	+0.9
Turnout		4,479		
BLP hold		Swing	+0.4	

==== Christ Church East Central ====
Christ Church East Central
Party	Candidate	Votes	%	±%
BLP	Ryan Straughn	2,969	65.7	−5.5
DLP	Rasheed Belgrave	1,294	28.7	+5.3
APP	Shawn Tudor	180	4.0	+2.4
BFP	Janette Ifil	73	1.6	New
Majority		1,675	37.1	−10.7
Turnout		4,516		
BLP hold		Swing	-5.4	

==== Christ Church South ====
Christ Church South
Party	Candidate	Votes	%	±%
BLP	Ralph Thorne	2,229	70.1	−0.3
DLP	Marc Laurent	722	22.7	−2.8
Independent	Donald Leacock	148	4.7	New
Independent	Buddy Larrier	79	2.5	+2.2
Majority		1,507	47.4	+2.5
Turnout		3,178		
BLP hold		Swing	+1.2	

==== Christ Church West ====
Christ Church West
Party	Candidate	Votes	%	±%
BLP	William Duguid	2,473	79.6	+10.0
DLP	Andrew Cave	633	20.4	+3.3
Majority		1,840	59.2	+6.8
Turnout		3,106		
BLP hold		Swing	+3.3	

==== Christ Church West Central ====
Christ Church West Central
Party	Candidate	Votes	%	±%
BLP	Adrian Forde	2,673	71.9	−2.4
DLP	Rennette Dimmott	695	18.7	−2.9
APP	Belfield Belgrave	184	5.0	+4.1
SB	Kenneth Lewis	164	4.4	+1.2
Majority		1,978	53.2	+0.5
Turnout		3,716		
BLP hold		Swing	+0.2	

==== City of Bridgetown ====
City of Bridgetown
Party	Candidate	Votes	%	±%
BLP	Corey Lane	2,089	77.5	+3.9
DLP	Kemar Stuart	459	17.0	−4.0
APP	Marva Lashley Todd	79	2.9	+1.2
Independent	Fallon Best	69	2.6	New
Majority		1,630	60.5	+7.9
Turnout		2,696		
BLP hold		Swing	+3.9	

==== St. Peter ====
St. Peter
Party	Candidate	Votes	%	±%
BLP	Colin Jordan	2,994	75.9	−5.6
DLP	Alwyn Babb	855	21.7	+5.7
NBKA	Lynroy Scantlebury	75	1.9	−0.5
BSP	Michael Thompson	22	0.6	New
Majority		2,139	54.2	−11.3
Turnout		3,946		
BLP hold		Swing	-5.6	

==== St. Joseph ====
St. Joseph
Party	Candidate	Votes	%	±%
BLP	Dale Marshall	2,344	67.1	−3.5
DLP	Randall Rouse	1,034	29.6	+17.4
APP	Paula Bradshaw	67	1.9	New
NBKA	Antonio Gittens	47	1.3	New
Majority		1,310	37.5	−18.5
Turnout		3,492		
BLP hold		Swing	-10.4	

==== St. Lucy ====
St. Lucy
Party	Candidate	Votes	%	±%
BLP	Peter Phillips	2,693	59.8	−6.6
DLP	Verla De Peiza	1,688	37.5	+7.5
APP	Wayne Griffith	124	2.8	+1.6
Majority		1,005	22.3	−14.1
Turnout		4,505		
BLP hold		Swing	-7.0	

==== St. Philip North ====
St. Philip North
Party	Candidate	Votes	%	±%
BLP	Sonia Browne	2,393	50.5	−10.5
DLP	Michael Lashley	2,158	45.5	+11.5
APP	Nigel Newton	88	1.9	+0.3
Independent	Omar Smith	64	1.4	New
Independent	Wayne Beckles	39	0.8	New
Majority		235	5.0	−22.0
Turnout		4,742		
BLP hold		Swing	-11.0	

==== St. Philip South ====
St. Philip South
Party	Candidate	Votes	%	±%
BLP	Indar Weir	3,175	62.3	−8.8
DLP	Neil Marshall	1,585	31.1	+8.4
APP	Bruce Hennis	225	4.4	+2.5
SB	Ronald Lorde	109	2.1	−1.5
Majority		1,590	31.2	−17.2
Turnout		5,094		
BLP hold		Swing	-8.6	

==== St. Philip West ====
St. Philip West
Party	Candidate	Votes	%	±%
BLP	Kay McConney	2,580	50.1	−16.8
DLP	David Estwick	2,140	41.5	+11.7
APP	Lynette Eastmond	328	6.4	New
SB	Karina Goodridge	104	2.0	−1.3
Majority		440	8.5	−28.6
Turnout		5,152		
BLP hold		Swing	-14.2	

==== St. Andrew ====
St. Andrew
Party	Candidate	Votes	%	±%
BLP	Romel Springer	3,201	74.8	+0.3
DLP	Oldwin Skeete	965	22.5	+0.3
APP	Jacqueline Alleyne	116	2.7	+1.6
Majority		2,236	52.2	−0.1
Turnout		4,282		
BLP hold		Swing	0.0	

==== St. George North ====
St. George North
Party	Candidate	Votes	%	±%
BLP	Toni Moore	3,295	70.2	−10.6
DLP	Herbert Harewood	1,159	24.7	+12.1
APP	Ferdinand Nicholls	196	4.2	+2.1
Independent	Melissa Taitt	44	0.9	New
Majority		2,136	45.5	−22.7
Turnout		4,694		
BLP hold		Swing	-11.3	

==== St. George South ====
St. George South
Party	Candidate	Votes	%	±%
BLP	Dwight Sutherland	3,673	72.8	−6.5
DLP	Dawn Marie Armstrong	1,143	22.7	+6.4
APP	Everton Holligan	151	3.0	+2.0
SB	Alison Weekes	76	1.5	−1.4
Majority		2,530	50.2	−12.9
Turnout		5,043		
BLP hold		Swing	-6.4	

==== St. James Central ====
St. James Central
Party	Candidate	Votes	%	±%
BLP	Kerrie Symonds	2,421	70.3	−7.9
DLP	Paul Gibson	911	26.4	+10.4
Independent	Erskine Alleyne	62	1.8	New
Independent	Joseph Jordan	52	1.5	+0.4
Majority		1,510	43.8	−18.4
Turnout		3,446		
BLP hold		Swing	-9.1	

==== St. James North ====
St. James North
Party	Candidate	Votes	%	±%
BLP	Edmund Hinkson	2,536	80.7	−3.0
DLP	Charles Worrell	608	19.3	+6.0
Majority		1,928	61.3	−9.1
Turnout		3,144		
BLP hold		Swing	-4.5	

==== St. James South ====
St. James South
Party	Candidate	Votes	%	±%
BLP	Sandra Husbands	2,879	63.8	−4.3
DLP	Ronnie Yearwood	1,633	36.2	+7.8
Majority		1,246	27.6	−12.1
Turnout		4,512		
BLP hold		Swing	-6.0	

==== St. John ====
St. John
Party	Candidate	Votes	%	±%
BLP	Charles Griffith	2,349	58.1	+0.2
DLP	Andre Worrell	1,547	38.3	+7.3
APP	Philippe Aimey	148	3.7	−2.3
Majority		802	19.8	−7.1
Turnout		4,044		
BLP hold		Swing	-3.5	

==== St. Michael Central ====
St. Michael Central
Party	Candidate	Votes	%	±%
BLP	Arthur Holder	2,014	67.8	−5.8
DLP	Courie Cox	670	22.6	0.0
APP	Joseph Atherley	267	9.0	+7.3
SB	Robert Toussaint	18	0.6	−0.9
Majority		1,344	45.3	−5.7
Turnout		2,969		
BLP hold		Swing	-2.9	

==== St. Michael East ====
St. Michael East
Party	Candidate	Votes	%	±%
BLP	Trevor Prescod	2,167	64.3	−7.2
DLP	Nicholas Alleyne	1,019	30.2	+6.1
APP	Erskine Branch	186	5.5	+4.5
Majority		1,148	34.0	−13.4
Turnout		3,372		
BLP hold		Swing	-6.6	

==== St. Michael North ====
St. Michael North
Party	Candidate	Votes	%	±%
BLP	Davidson Ishmael	2,394	71.5	−0.8
DLP	Ricardo Harrison	754	22.5	−0.8
APP	Maria Phillips	201	6.0	+4.0
Majority		1,640	49.0	−0.1
Turnout		3,349		
BLP hold		Swing	0.0	

==== St. Michael North East ====
St. Michael North East
Party	Candidate	Votes	%	±%
BLP	Mia Mottley	3,216	86.0	−1.2
DLP	Damien Griffith	476	12.7	+3.1
BFP	Roy Turney	48	1.3	+0.6
Majority		2,740	73.3	−4.3
Turnout		3,740		
BLP hold		Swing	-2.1	

==== St. Michael North West ====
St. Michael North West
Party	Candidate	Votes	%	±%
BLP	Neil Rowe	1,914	64.1	+8.5
DLP	Ryan Walters	1,072	35.9	−8.5
Majority		842	28.2	+17.1
Turnout		2,986		
BLP hold		Swing	+8.5	

==== St. Michael South ====
St. Michael South
Party	Candidate	Votes	%	±%
BLP	Kirk Humphrey	2,200	74.3	+4.3
DLP	Kevin Miller	605	20.4	−5.1
BFP	Alex Mitchell	59	2.0	+1.3
APP	Irvin Belgrave	58	2.0	+0.7
SB	Patricia Cox	41	1.4	−1.1
Majority		1,595	53.8	+9.8
Turnout		2,963		
BLP hold		Swing	+4.7	

==== St. Michael South Central ====
St. Michael South Central
Party	Candidate	Votes	%	±%
BLP	Marsha Caddle	1,936	63.2	−4.4
DLP	Richard Sealy	932	30.4	+4.6
APP	David Gill	195	6.4	+1.8
Majority		1,004	32.8	−9.0
Turnout		3,063		
BLP hold		Swing	-4.5	

==== St. Michael South East ====
St. Michael South East
Party	Candidate	Votes	%	±%
BLP	Santia Bradshaw	2,786	76.0	+0.4
DLP	Pedro Shepherd	699	19.1	−2.7
APP	Patrick Tannis	180	4.9	+4.4
Majority		2,087	56.9	+3.2
Turnout		3,665		
BLP hold		Swing	+1.5	

==== St. Michael West ====
St. Michael West
Party	Candidate	Votes	%	±%
BLP	Christopher Gibbs	2,434	80.1	+3.3
DLP	Ricardo Williams	439	14.5	−5.5
APP	Patsie Nurse	122	4.0	+2.9
SB	Victorine Wilson	44	1.5	+0.2
Majority		1,995	65.6	+8.8
Turnout		3,039		
BLP hold		Swing	+4.4	

==== St. Michael West Central ====
St. Michael West Central
Party	Candidate	Votes	%	±%
BLP	Ian Gooding-Edghill	2,420	72.9	−2.7
DLP	Curtis Cave	795	23.9	+4.0
SB	Angela Edey	64	1.9	−1.0
APP	Veronica Price	30	0.9	+0.2
BFP	David Roberts	11	0.3	New
Majority		1,625	48.9	−6.8
Turnout		3,320		
BLP hold		Swing	-3.3	

==== St. Thomas ====
St. Thomas
Party	Candidate	Votes	%	±%
BLP	Cynthia Forde	2,971	78.6	−7.1
DLP	Rolerick Hinds	625	16.5	+5.7
BSP	Philip Catlyn	98	2.6	New
Independent	Samuel Maynard	88	2.3	New
Majority		2,346	62.0	−12.9
Turnout		3,782		
BLP hold		Swing	-6.4	

== Aftermath ==
Prime Minister Mottley and attorney-general Dale Marshall were both sworn in for a second term by president Sandra Mason on 20 January 2022.

On 21 January, as the DLP had not regained any seats in the House of Assembly, DLP president Verla De Peiza resigned. Ronnie Yearwood was then subsequently elected leader of the party on 1 May 2022. APP leader Joseph Atherley announced that the alliance would begin preparing for the next election. Both APP and DLP drew attention to the low voter turnout rate.

The Solutions Barbados party congratulated the BLP and announced its willingness to work with the government. Prime Minister Mottley received congratulations from foreign countries and organisations such as Caricom and the OECS.

The newly re-elected Prime Minister of Barbados, Mia Mottley, announced the following Cabinet of Ministers on 24 January 2022, and subsequently added William Duguid the next day:

Cabinet of Ministers after the 2022 Barbadian general election
Ministerial Office	Office Holder	Constituency	Political Party
Prime Minister; Minister of Finance and Economic Affairs, with responsibility for Culture, Security, Public Service, Caricom and Development Commissions	Mia Mottley	St. Michael North East	Barbados Labour Party
Deputy Prime Minister; Senior Minister; Minister of Transport, Works and Water Resources	Sanita Bradshaw	St. Michael South East	Barbados Labour Party
Attorney General and Minister of Legal Affairs; Senior Minister Governance	Dale Marshall	St. Joseph	Barbados Labour Party
Minister of Energy and Business Development; Senior Minister	Kerrie Symmonds	St. James Central	Barbados Labour Party
Minister of Foreign Affairs and Foreign Trade; Senior Minister, Social and Environmental Policy	Jerome Walcott	N/A (Senator)	Barbados Labour Party
Senior Minister in the Prime Minister's Office, with responsibility for Infrastructure and Town Planning Matters	William Fondleroy Duguid	Christ Church West	Barbados Labour Party
Minister of Homes Affairs and Information	Wilfred Abrahams	Christ Church East	Barbados Labour Party
Minister of Agriculture, Food and Nutrition Security	Indar Weir	St. Philip South	Barbados Labour Party
Minister of Tourism and International Transport	Ian Gooding-Edghill	St. Michael West Central	Barbados Labour Party
Minister for the Public Service, Home Affairs, Labour and Gender Affairs	Lisa Cummins	N/A (Senator)	Barbados Labour Party
Minister of Education, Technological and Vocational Training	Kay McConney	St. Philip West	Barbados Labour Party
Minister of Housing, lands and Maintenance	Dwight Sutherland	St. George South	Barbados Labour Party
Minister of People Empowerment and Elder Affairs	Kirk Humphrey	St. Michael South	Barbados Labour Party
Minister of the Environment and National Beautification and Blue Economy	Adrian Forde	Christ Church West Central	Barbados Labour Party
Minister of Labour, Social Security and Third Sector	Colin Jordan	St. Peter	Barbados Labour Party
Minister of Industry, Innovation, Science and Technology	Davidson Ishmael	St. Michael North	Barbados Labour Party
Minister of Youth, Sports and Community Empowerment	Charles Griffith	St. John	Barbados Labour Party
Minister in the Ministry of Finance and Economic Development	Ryan Straughn	Christ Church East Central	Barbados Labour Party
Minister in the Office of the Prime Minister	Shantal Munro-Knight	N/A (Senator)	Barbados Labour Party
Minister of State in the Ministry of Health and Wellness	Sonia Browne	St. Philip North	Barbados Labour Party
Minister of State in the Ministry of Foreign Trade and Ministry of Business Development	Sandra Husbands	St. James South	Barbados Labour Party

Source: St.Lucia Times

Parliamentary Secretaries
Office	Office Holder	Constituency	Political party
Parliamentary Secretary in the Ministry of Transport, Works and Water Resources, with responsibility for Water Resources	Romel Springer	St. Andrew	Barbados Labour Party
Parliamentary Secretary in the Ministry of People Empowerment and Elder Affairs	Corey Lane	City of Bridgetown	Barbados Labour Party

Source: St.Lucia Times

== See also ==
- List of parliamentary constituencies of Barbados
