= Saint Joseph (Barbados Parliament constituency) =

Parliamentary constituency in Barbados

- Constituency for the House of Assembly of Barbados
- Region: Saint Joseph, Barbados

Current constituency
- Created: 1645

Saint Joseph is a constituency in the Saint Joseph parish of Barbados. It was established in 1645 as one of the original 11 constituencies. Since 2018, it has been represented in the House of Assembly of the Barbadian Parliament by Dale Marshall, a member of the BLP. (Note: As with all constituencies, the constituency elects one member of parliament (MP) by the first past the post system of election at least every five years.) The Saint Joseph constituency is a marginal seat for the BLP.

== Boundaries ==
The constituency runs:

From a point on the eastern sea coast south of Barclays Park and east of the terminus of the gully leading to the culvert which crosses the East Coast Road, in a straight line to the terminus of the gully; thence along this gully to its junction with an unclassified road leading to Cambridge; thence in a southerly and then south westerly direction along the middle of this unclassified road to its junction with a public road known as Coggins Hill; thence in a north westerly direction along the middle of Coggins Hill to its junction with Highway 2 (the Haggatts-Springvale Road); thence in a south westerly direction along the middle of Highway 2 to its junction with the Mt. Wilton-Bloomsbury Road; thence in an easterly and south easterly direction along the middle of the Bloomsbury-Mt. Wilton Road to the junction of Laynes Bridge and Highway E (the Mt. Wilton Road) thence in a southerly direction along Highway E to its junction with the Walkes Spring-Jack-inthe-Box Road; thence along the middle of the Jack-in-the- Box Road to the point where it is crossed by the Jack-in-the-Box Gully; thence in a southerly direction along the middle of Jack-in-the-Box Gully, to the point where it meets the BridgefieldProute-Fisherpond Gully; thence in an easterly direction along the middle of the Bridgefield-Proute-Fisherpond Gully to the point where it is crossed by Highway E (Proute-Mt. Wilton Road); thence in a southerly direction along the middle of Highway E to its junction with the Applewhaite-Selmans-Fisherpond Road; thence in an easterly direction along the middle of the Applewhaite-Selmans-Fisherpond Road to its junction with the Fisherpond-Lammings Road; thence in a southerly direction along the middle of the Fisherpond-Lammings Road to its junction with Highway 3 (the Groves-Andrews Factory Road); thence along the middle the Groves-Andrews Factory Road to the junction with the Claybury-Mt. Tabor Church Road; thence in an easterly direction along the Claybury-Mt. Tabor Church Road to its junction with the Mt. Tabor-Venture-Malvern Road; thence in a northerly direction along the Mt. Tabor-Venture-Malvern Road to its junction with the Malvern-Edgecliff Road; thence in an easterly direction along the middle of the Malvern-Edgecliff Road to its junction with an unclassified road leading from Malvern to Hackleton’s Cliff; thence in a northerly and then north easterly direction along this unclassified road to a monument (B.9) placed near the edge of Hackleton’s Cliff; then north easterly along the line joining this monument with another monument (B.10) placed at the end of an unclassified road at Foster Hall; then along this road to its junction with the public road called Highway F to a point opposite a monument (B.11) placed on the northern side of the road; then in a straight line through the triangulation station number S.38 at Three Boys Rock to the sea; thence in a north westerly direction along the sea coast to a point on the coast south of Barclays Park and east of the terminus of the gully leading to the culvert which crosses the East Coast Road (the starting point).

== Members ==
Election	Member	Party
2018	Dale Marshall	BLP
2022	Dale Marshall	BLP

== Elections ==
=== 2022 ===
St. Joseph
Party	Candidate	Votes	%	±%
BLP	Dale Marshall	2,344	67.1	−3.5
DLP	Randall Rouse	1,034	29.6	+17.4
APP	Paula Bradshaw	67	1.9	New
NBKA	Antonio Gittens	47	1.3	New
Majority		1,310	37.5	−18.5
Turnout		3,492		
BLP hold		Swing	-10.4	

=== 2018 ===
St. Joseph
Party	Candidate	Votes	%	±%
BLP	Dale Marshall	3,391	70.6	+17.1
Independent	Randall Rouse	700	14.6	new
DLP	Dennis Holder	588	12.2	−34.3
SB	Jennifer Highland	125	2.6	new
Majority		2,691	56.0	+49.1
Turnout		4,804		
BLP hold		Swing	n/a	
