= William Fondleroy Duguid =

Barbadian politician

William Fondleroy Duguid (born 20 November 1967 in Christ Church, Barbados) is a Barbadian politician and DENTAL [surgeon]]. He is a former senior minister in the Prime Minister's Office in charge of Infrastructural Projects and Town Planning Matters and former member of cabinet in the Mia Mottley Administration. Duguid has also served as a member of parliament in the Barbados House of Assembly.

== Early life and education ==
William Fondleroy Duguid was born in Christ Church on November 20, 1967. He studied at Merrivale Preparatory School after which he enrolled to Harrison College and finished at Barbados Community College. After college, he attended University of Wales College of Medicine. He holds a degree in Dentistry from Cardiff University School of Medicine. He is a Fellow of the Royal College of Surgeons.

== Career ==
In 2003 during the general elections, Duguid ran for Barbados House of Assembly and was elected representing Christ Church West constituency. He was elected through the Barbados Labour Party. After the end of his first tenure in 2008, he was re-elected again to serve till 2013. He has also served as the first vice president of the National Executive Council of BLP. He is also the former General Secretary of the Barbados Labour Party.

During the 2018 general election of Barbados, he was again elected as member of parliament. He was subsequently appointed Minister of Transport, Works, and Maintenance.

However, the Member of Parliament for Christ Church West was not reappointed as a Senior Minister during the early 2026 Cabinet reshuffle. He currently serves as a backbencher.
