= Sandra Husbands =

Barbadian politician (born 1959)

Member of the House of Assembly of Barbados for Saint James South
- Incumbent
- Assumed office 2018

Personal details
- Born: 27 February 1959 (age 67)
- Party: Barbados Labour Party

Cheryl Sandra V. Husbands (born 27 February 1959) is a Barbadian politician from the Barbados Labour Party.

== Political career ==
Husbands is member of the House of Assembly for Saint James South. In the Cabinet of Barbados, Husbands serves as Minister in the Ministry of Foreign Affairs and Foreign Trade.
