= Alliance Party for Progress =

Electoral alliance in Barbados

- Leader: Joseph Atherley
- Founders: Joseph Atherley; Lynette Eastmond
- Founded: 31 December 2021
- Ideology: Social democracy; Christian left; Progressivism
- Political position: Centre-left
- Colours: Green and orange
- Slogan: "Download de APP"

Website
- https://appbarbados.org/

The Alliance Party for Progress (APP) was a Christian and social democratic electoral alliance in Barbados. It was formed on the 30 December 2021 by the United Progressive Party (UPP) and the People's Party for Democracy and Development (PdP) to contest the 2022 Barbadian general election. It is headed by the leader of the PdP Bishop Joseph Atherley with the leader of the UPP Lynette Eastmond becoming deputy head. By 2026, the alliance had been dissolved.

== History ==
The United Progressive Party was formed in 2017 and Lynette Eastmond was chosen to lead the new party after much media speculation, concerning the political ambitions of Eastmond herself. That same year after discussions with another new Barbadian party called the Citizens Action Partnership, led by Wendell Callender both parties agreed to merge the CAP into the UPP in December 2017. The UPP later contested the 2018 Barbadian general election the next year but only won 1.3 per cent of the vote losing the one seat of Christ Church West, held by new UPP's member, Dr. Agard back to the Barbados Labour Party (BLP).

That same election Joseph Atherley of the BLP won back the St. Michael West seat. On 31 May, less than a week after the swearing-in of the new government, Atherley informed the prime minister of his intention to leave the BLP and become an independent parliamentarian. Due to the absence of other non-BLP MPs in Parliament, Atherley was sworn in the next day as Leader of the Opposition. He later formed the People's Party for Democracy and Development on 9 June 2018 becoming the official opposition party.

On 27 December 2021, Prime Minister of Barbados Mia Mottley dissolved parliament and called elections for 19 January 2022. The next week, on the 31 December 2021, Atherley and Eastmond announced an electoral alliance between their two parties to contest the 2022 general elections as the APP.

On 19 January 2025, the UPP, along with the New National Party (NNP) and the Conservative Barbados Leadership Party (CBLP), announced the formation of a new electoral alliance People's Coalition for Progress (PCP). That same day Atherley, announced that "I’m not involved in any of these coalitions. I’m not a member of any of the two major parties, nor have I been involved to this moment with any of the two main parties.” and that the PdP would not be contesting the 2026 Barbadian general election, signalling an end to the electoral alliance.

== Election results ==
Election	Leader	Votes	%	Seats	+/–	Position	Government
2022	Joseph Atherley	3,205	2.81%	0 / 30	New	3rd	Extra-parliamentary

== See also ==
- United Progressive Party
- People's Party for Democracy and Development
- List of political parties in Barbados
