= Dale Marshall (politician) =

Barbados lawyer and politician

The Honourable Dale Dermot Marshall, SC
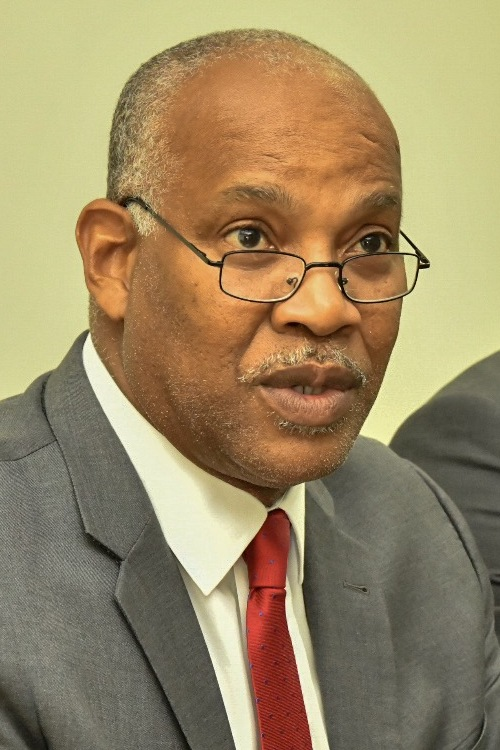
- Marshall in 2019

Attorney General of Barbados
- Constituency: Saint Joseph
- Incumbent
- Assumed office 25 May 2018
- Monarch: Elizabeth II (until 2021)
- President: Sandra Mason (since 2021)
- Governor-General: Sandra Mason (until 2021)
- Prime Minister: Mia Mottley
- Preceded by: Adriel Brathwaite
- In office 20 February 2006 – 20 December 2007
- Monarch: Elizabeth II
- Governor-General: Clifford Husbands
- Prime Minister: Owen Arthur
- Preceded by: Mia Mottley
- Succeeded by: Freundel Stuart

Personal details
- Born: 25 November 1963 (age 62)
- Party: Barbados Labour Party
- Profession: Lawyer

Dale Dermot Marshall SC (born 25 November 1963) is the Attorney General and Minister of Legal Affairs in Barbados.

He was educated at St. Stephens Boys School, St. George Boys School, Combermere School, the University of the West Indies and the Hugh Wooding Law School.

Marshall is the holder of an LL.B. with Honours and a Certificate in Legal Education. He is a member of the Barbados Bar Association and the Computer Law Association.

Appointed to the Senate of Barbados in 1999, he has given public service between 1994 and 1997 as Chairman of the Board of the National Housing Corporation, Chairman of the Urban Development Commission 1997-1999 and Chairman of the Barbados Tourism Authority 1999–2000.

Marshall joined the Barbados Labour Party in 1996.

On 20 February 2006 Marshall was sworn in by Sir Clifford Husbands at Government house to the post of Attorney-General, a post which he held until the 20 December 2007 when Prime Minister Owen Arthur dissolved Parliament and called elections.

Following the Barbados Labour Party's defeat at the polls 15 January 2008, Dale Marshall was appointed by the new Leader of the Party and Opposition Leader Mia Mottley, to the post of Deputy Leader of the Opposition. He is MP for the Saint Joseph constituency.

He was once again appointed Attorney General when Mia Mottley took office as Prime Minister on 25 May 2018.

Marshall is married and is the father of two children.
