= Conservative Barbados Leadership Party =

- Abbreviation: CBLP
- Leader: Corey Beckles
- President: Corey Beckles
- General Secretary: Shannon Springer
- Founder: Corey Beckles
- Founded: 25 January 2025
- Ideology: Conservatism; Youth Empowerment
- Political position: Center-right
- Colors: Purple
- House of Assembly: 0 / 30
- Senate: 0 / 21

Website
- Facebook page

The Conservative Barbados Leadership Party (CBLP) is a conservative Barbadian political party founded in 2025.

== History ==
The Conservative Barbados Leadership Party (CBLP) was founded on 25 January 2025 by attorney Corey Beckles at Strathclyde Drive, St Michael on the "principal values of conservatism."

The CBLP announced on 19 January 2026, that it was forming an electoral alliance known as the People's Coalition for Progress (PCP) with the United Progressive Party and the New National Party to contest the 2026 Barbadian general election.

== Electoral Performance ==
Election	Electoral Alliance	Leader	Votes		Seats		Position	Government
Election	Electoral Alliance	Leader	No.	Share	No.	+/–	Position	Government
2026	PCP	Kemar Stuart; Lynette Eastmond; Corey Beckles	910	0.89%	0 / 30	New	4th	Extra-parliamentary

== See also ==
- Politics of Barbados
- Elections in Barbados
