= New National Party (Barbados) =

- Abbreviation: NNP
- Leader: Carolyn Clarke
- Founder: Kemar Stuart
- Founded: April 28, 2025
- Split from: Democratic Labour Party
- Ideology: Anti-Corruption Multiculturalism
- Colors: Orange and Green
- Slogan: "Renewal, Progress, Leadership"
- House of Assembly: 0 / 30
- Senate: 0 / 21

Election symbol
- Barbados

The New National Party (NNP) is a political party in Barbados founded in 2025 by activist and former general secretary of the Democratic Labour Party Kemar Stuart.

== History ==
The New National Party (NNP) was founded by activist and former general secretary of the Democratic Labour Party Kemar Stuart on the 4 April 2025. It was founded after Stuart was dismissed from his role after former Barbados Labour Party MP Ralph Thorne crossed the floor and became leader of the opposition and of the DLP. Stuart subsequently left the party and formed the NNP focused on " looking at the cultural unity across society" and "emphasising values, competence, and inclusiveness."

The NNP announced on 19 January 2026, that it was forming an electoral alliance known as the People's Coalition for Progress (PCP) with the United Progressive Party (UPP) and the Conservative Barbados Leadership Party (CBLP) to contest the 2026 Barbadian general election.

On 28 April 2026, Stuart resigned as leader of the party and was replaced by Carolyn Clarke. Stuart would later rejoin the Democratic Labour Party.

== Electoral Performance ==
Election	Electoral Alliance	Leader	Votes		Seats		Position	Government
Election	Electoral Alliance	Leader	No.	Share	No.	+/–	Position	Government
2026	PCP	Kemar Stuart; Lynette Eastmond; Corey Beckles	910	0.89%	0 / 30	New	4th	Extra-parliamentary

== See also ==
- Politics of Barbados
- Elections in Barbados
