= 2013 Barbadian general election =

- 21 February 2013

All 30 seats in the House of Assembly 16 seats needed for a majority
- Turnout: 62.02% (▼1.52pp)
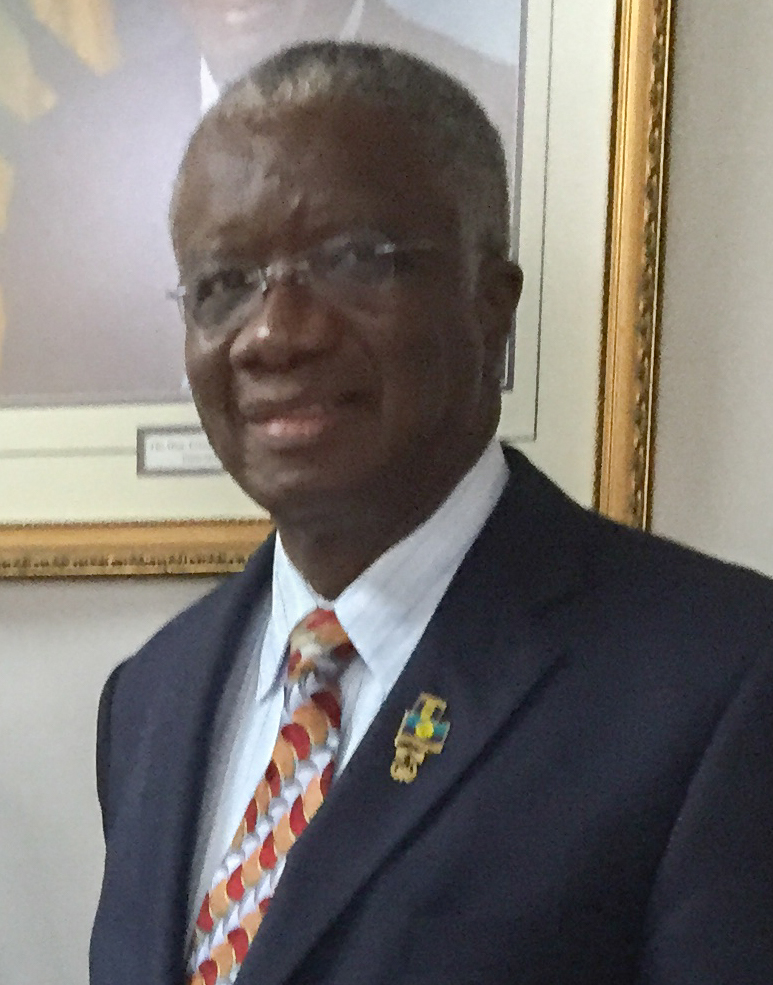

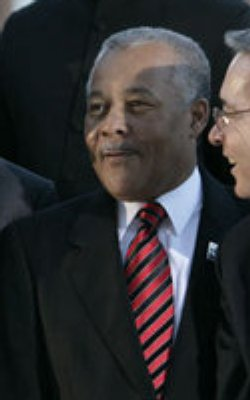
| | First party | Second party |
|---|---|---|
| Leader | Freundel Stuart | Owen Arthur |
| Party | DLP | BLP |
| Last election | 52.55%, 20 seats | 47.16%, 10 seats |
| Seats won | 16 | 14 |
| Seat change | ▼4 | ▲4 |
| Popular vote | 78,851 | 74,121 |
| Percentage | 51.30% | 48.22% |
| Swing | ▼1.25pp | ▲1.06pp |
- Results by constituency
Prime Minister before election
Freundel Stuart
DLP
Elected Prime Minister
Freundel Stuart
DLP

General elections were held in Barbados on 21 February 2013. They were the first post-independence elections where the election date was announced five years after the last general election. The result was a victory for the ruling Democratic Labour Party but with a reduced majority, with the party winning 16 of the 30 seats in the House of Assembly.

== Background ==
According to the Constitution of Barbados, elections must take place no longer than every five years from the first sitting of Parliament. The last general election was held on 15 January 2008, while the first sitting of the current session of Parliament was held on 12 February 2008. After the dissolution of Parliament, the Governor-General of Barbados, on behalf of the Crown in Right of Barbados, must issue a writ for a general election for members of the House of Assembly and for the appointment of Senators to the Senate within 90 days.

The election and nomination dates were announced by Prime Minister Freundel Stuart on 29 January 2013. The nomination deadline for candidates to register was scheduled for 6 February 2013.

== Results ==
| Party | Votes | % | Seats | +/– |
|---|---|---|---|---|
| Democratic Labour Party | 78,851 | 51.30 | 16 | –4 |
| Barbados Labour Party | 74,121 | 48.22 | 14 | +4 |
| People's Democratic Congress | 89 | 0.06 | 0 | 0 |
| Bajan Free Party | 50 | 0.03 | 0 | New |
| Kingdom Government of Barbados | 39 | 0.03 | 0 | New |
| Independents | 552 | 0.36 | 0 | 0 |
| Total | 153,702 | 100.00 | 30 | 0 |
| Valid votes | 153,702 | 99.52 | | |
| Invalid/blank votes | 741 | 0.48 | | |
| Total votes | 154,443 | 100.00 | | |
| Registered voters/turnout | 249,024 | 62.02 | | |
Source: Caribbean Elections

== See also ==
- List of parliamentary constituencies of Barbados
