= United Progressive Party (Barbados) =

- Abbreviation: UPP
- Chairperson: Lynette Eastmond
- Founded: 2017
- Merged into: Citizens Action Partnership
- Ideology: Social democracy Progressivism
- Political position: Centre-left
- Colors: Orange
- Slogan: UPP 'De Ting!
- House of Assembly: 0 / 30
- Senate: 0 / 21

Election symbol
- People

Website
- www.uppbarbados.org

The United Progressive Party is a political party in Barbados. The party was announced in February 2017 to coincide with the May 2018 general election cycle. The lead chairperson is the Attorney-at-Law and former Senator and Minister with the Barbados Labour Party, Ms. Lynette Eastmond.

== History ==
The United Progressive Party was formed in 2017 and Lynette Eastmond was chosen to lead the new party after much media speculation concerning the political ambitions of Eastmond herself. Early in the party's history another former BLP member who turned independent parliamentary member, Dr. Maria Agard, crossed the floor to join the UPP. Agard subsequently dropped out of the party just prior to the election deciding to no longer contest the current election.

In November, 2017 the party announced a manifesto outlining its party agenda for Barbados. This was announced under the banner of "The New Economy Manifesto" and the "Orange Economy" in line with the party's chosen colour of orange.

After discussions with another new Barbados party called the Citizens Action Partnership, led by Wendell Callender both parties agreed to merge the CAP into the UPP in December 2017.

On 27 December 2021, Prime Minister of Barbados Mia Mottley dissolved parliament and called elections for 19 January 2022. The next week, on the 31 December 2021, leader of the People's Party for Democracy and Development (PdP) Bishop Joseph Atherley and Eastmond announced an electoral alliance between their two parties to contest the 2022 general elections as the Alliance Party for Progress. It was headed by Atherley with Eastmond becoming deputy head.

The UPP announced on 19 January 2026, that it was forming an electoral alliance known as the People's Coalition for Progress (PCP) with the New National Party (NNP) and the Conservative Barbados Leadership Party (CBLP) to contest the 2026 Barbadian general election. That same day, Atherley announced that "I’m not involved in any of these coalitions. I’m not a member of any of the two major parties, nor have I been involved to this moment with any of the two main parties.” and that the PdP would not be contesting the 2026 Barbadian general election, signalling an end to the electoral alliance.

== Party officers ==
During the August Congress of the UPP the following were elected as officers for the UPP:

- Chairman – Lynette Eastmond
- First Deputy Chairman – Everton Holligan
- Second Deputy Chairman – Maria Phillips
- Secretary – Peter Bridgeman
- First Assistant Secretary – Edison Bynoe
- Second Assistant Secretary – Sandra G. Corbin
- Treasurer – Ambrose Grosvenor
- First Assistant Treasurer – Bruce Hennis
- Second Assistant Treasurer – Hudson Griffith
- Public Relations Officer – Wayne T. Griffith

== Electoral results & performance ==
For the Barbados House of Assembly's 2018 general election, the UPP won 1.3 per cent of the vote losing the one seat of Christ Church West, held by new UPP's member, Dr. Agard back to the Barbados Labour Party. The BLP had a historic landslide election securing 74.58 per cent of the 150,141 total votes. and winning all 30 of the seats in the House of Assembly. The party announced it would be contest in future Barbados elections.

Election	Party Leader	Votes	%	Seats	+/–	Position	Government
2018	Lynette Eastmond	1,913	1.2	0 / 30	▼1	▼4th	Extra-parliamentary

For 2022 Barbadian general election, the UPP formed an electoral alliance with the People's Party for Democracy and Development (PdP) and formed the Alliance Party for Progress and ran under that banner.

Election	Electoral Alliance	Leader	Votes		Seats		Position	Government
Election	Electoral Alliance	Leader	No.	Share	No.	+/–	Position	Government
2022	APP	Joseph Atherley	3,205	2.81%	0 / 30	New	3rd	Extra-parliamentary
2026	PCP	Kemar Stuart; Lynette Eastmond; Corey Beckles	910	0.89%	0 / 30	New	4th	Extra-parliamentary

== 2018 candidates ==
The UPP had 23 candidates out of 30 in the 2018 general election. These were:

- Victor Knight (Christ Church East)
- Ogeji Dottin (Christ Church East-Central)
- Nadja Willis (Christ Church South)
- Ria Riley (Christ Church West-Central)
- Roli Roachford (St. Andrew)
- Everton Holligan (St. George North)
- Craig Harewood (St. George South)
- Grafton Cobham (St. James North)
- Christal Austin (St. James South)
- Wendall Callendar (St. James Central)
- Hudson Griffith (St. John)
- Wayne Griffith (St. Lucy)
- Richard Barrow (St. Michael Central)
- Paul Forte (St. Michael East)
- Maria Philips (St. Michael North)
- Sandra Corbin (St. Michael South)
- David Gill (St. Michael South Central)
- Veronica Price (St. Michael South East)
- Patsie Nurse (St. Michael West)
- Herman Lowe (St. Michael West Central)
- Nigel Newton (St. Philip North)
- Bruce Henis (St. Philip South)
- Lynette Eastmond (City of Bridgetown)

== Social outreach ==
The UPP uses several forms of Internet mediums to reach out to new and existing supporters. This includes: Google+, Facebook, and Twitter feeds.

== See also ==
- Politics of Barbados
- Elections in Barbados
