= List of members of the House of Assembly of Barbados =

The following is a list of past and present Members of Parliament (MPs) of the House of Assembly of Barbados, the lower house of the Parliament of Barbados. The most recent election was held on 11 February 2026.

== Colour key ==
Barbados Labour Party
Democratic Labour Party

== Members ==
Name	Party	Term start	Term end	Constituency	Other positions	Ref.
Wilfred Abrahams	BLP	2018	Present	Christ Church East		
Maria Agard	BLP	2013	2018	Christ Church West		
Owen Arthur (Note: Arthur left the BLP and became an independent politician in 2014.)	BLP	1984	2018	Saint Peter	Prime Minister of Barbados (1994–2008)	
Joseph Atherley	BLP	2018	2022	Saint Michael West		
Errol Barrow	DLP	1971	1987	Saint John	Prime Minister of Barbados (1966–1976; 1986–1987)	
Chad Blackman	BLP	2025 by-election	Present	Saint James North		
Jeffrey Bostic	BLP	2013	2022	City of Bridgetown		
Edgar Bourne	DLP	1986	1991	Christ Church East		
Santia Bradshaw	BLP	2018	Present	Saint Michael South East		
Leroy Brathwaite	BLP	?	1994	Saint Michael North East		
Roy Brathwaite	BLP	1981	1986	Saint Lucy		
Ryan Brathwaite	BLP	2026	Present	Saint Joseph		
Sonia Browne	BLP	2018	Present	Saint Philip North		
John Boyce	DLP	2008	2018	Christ Church South		
Marsha Caddle	BLP	2018	Present	Saint Michael South Central		
Wendell Callender	BLP	1994	1999	Christ Church East		
Duncan Carter	BLP	1994	2003	Christ Church East Central		
Richard Cheltenham	BLP	1976	1986	Christ Church East		
Gline Clarke	BLP	2018	2022	Saint George North		
Henry de Boulay Forde	BLP	1971	2003	Christ Church West	Leader of the Opposition (1986–1989)	
William Fondleroy Duguid	BLP	2003	2013	Christ Church West		
William Fondleroy Duguid	BLP	2018	Present	Christ Church West		
Tyrone Estwick	DLP	1991	1994	Christ Church East		
Reginald Farley	BLP	1999	2008	Christ Church East		
Adrian Forde	BLP	2018	Present	Christ Church West Central		
Cynthia Forde	BLP	2001 by-election	2026	Saint Thomas		
Christopher Gibbs	BLP	2022	Present	Saint Michael West		
George Gooding-Edghill	BLP	?	2022	Saint Michael West Central		
Ian Gooding-Edghill	BLP	2022	Present	Saint Michael West Central		
Edward Evelyn Greaves	DLP	1971	1981	Saint Lucy		
Edward Evelyn Greaves	DLP	1986	1994	Saint Lucy		
Charles McDonald Griffith	BLP	2018	Present	Saint John		
Walter Hinds	BLP	1971	1984	Saint Peter		
Edmund Hinkson	BLP	2018	2025	Saint James North		
Arthur Holder	BLP	2018	2026	Saint Michael Central		
Kirk Humphrey	BLP	2018	Present	Saint Michael South		
Sandra Husbands	BLP	2018	Present	Saint James South		
Davidson Ishmael	BLP	2022	Present	Saint Michael North		
Ronald D. Jones	DLP	2003	2018	Christ Church East Central		
Colin Jordan	BLP	2018	Present	Saint Peter		
Denis Kellman	DLP	1994	2018	Saint Lucy		
John King	BLP	2018	2022	Saint Philip West		
Corey Lane	BLP	2022	2026	City of Bridgetown		
Michael Lashley	BLP	2026	Present	City of Bridgetown		
Dennis Lowe	DLP	2008	2018	Christ Church East		
Dale Marshall	BLP	2018	2022	Saint Joseph		
Clyde Mascoll	DLP	1996 by-election	2008	Saint Michael North West		
Kay McConney	BLP	2022	Present	Saint Philip West		
Billie Miller	BLP	1976	2008	City of Bridgetown	Deputy Prime Minister of Barbados (1994–2003)	
Toni Moore	BLP	2022	Present	Saint George North		
Robert Morris	DLP	1986	1994	Christ Church East Central		
Elliott Mottley	BLP	1971	1976	City of Bridgetown		
Mia Mottley	BLP	1994	Present	Saint Michael North East	Prime Minister of Barbados (since 2018)	
Shantal Munro-Knight	BLP	2026	Present	Christ Church South		
Gregory Nicholls	BLP	2026	Present	Saint Thomas		
George Payne	BLP	2018	2022	Saint Andrew		
Peter Phillips	BLP	2018	Present	Saint Lucy		
Trevor Prescod	BLP	2018	Present	Saint Michael East		
Neil Rowe	BLP	2018	Present	Saint Michael North West		
David Simmons	BLP	1976 by-election	2001	Saint Thomas		
Christopher Sinckler	DLP	2008	2018	Saint Michael North West		
Romel Springer	BLP	2022	Present	Saint Andrew		
Harold Bernard St. John	BLP	1991	2003	Christ Church South	Prime Minister of Barbados (1985–1986)	
Harold Bernard St. John	BLP	1981	1986	Christ Church East Central	Prime Minister of Barbados (1985–1986)	
Ryan Straughn	BLP	2018	Present	Christ Church East Central		
Dwight Sutherland	BLP	2018	Present	Saint George South		
Kerrie Symmonds	BLP	2018	Present	Saint James Central		
Cuthbert Edwy Talma	DLP	1971	1976	Christ Church East	Deputy Prime Minister of Barbados (1971–1976)	
David Thompson	DLP	1987	2011	Saint John	Prime Minister of Barbados (2008–2010)	
Mara Thompson	DLP	2011 by-election	2018	Saint John		
Ralph Thorne (Note: Thorne left the BLP and joined the DLP in 2024.)	BLP	2018	2026	Christ Church South		
Pat Todd	DLP	2008	2013	City of Bridgetown		
Ronald Toppin	BLP	2018	2022	Saint Michael North		
Tyra Trotman	BLP	2026	Present	Saint Michael Central		
Jerome Walcott	BLP	2003	2008	Christ Church South		
Lawson Weekes	DLP	1994	1996	Saint Michael North West		
Indar Weir	BLP	2018	Present	Saint Philip South		

== See also ==
- List of presidents of the Senate of Barbados
- List of members of the Senate of Barbados
