= Cabinet of Barbados =

Individuals in the Government of Barbados

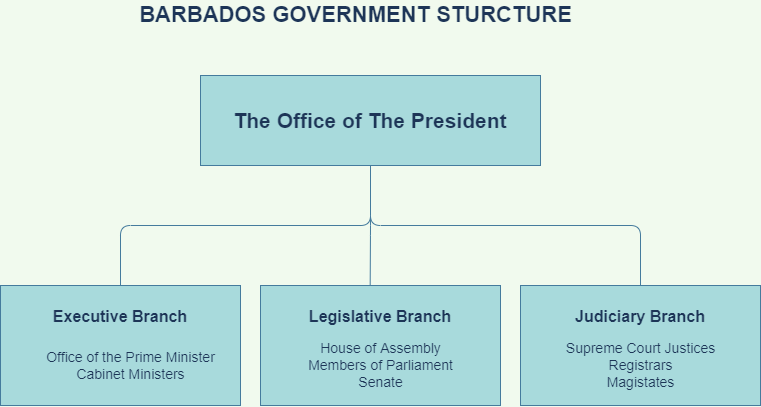
Simplification of the government structure of Barbados

The Cabinet are individuals of Barbados which execute the duties of the Government of Barbados. Under a Parliamentary republic, these powers are vested nominally by the president of Barbados, but are exercised in practice by a cabinet ministers, presided over by the prime minister of Barbados. The prime minister is formally appointed by the president: the president must appoint, as prime minister, someone who can control a majority of votes in the House of Assembly. In practice, this is normally the leader of the largest political party or coalition in the house. When there is no clear majority, the president assumes the role of arbitrator and opens negotiations with the leaders of the various political parties, in the hope of finding someone whom a majority will accept as prime minister. In the event of that failing to take place, the president must dissolve the House of Assembly and call an early election.

== History ==
The Cabinet system of government was implemented in the colony of Barbados on 1 February 1954 leading to attainment of full self-government. Prior to an official Cabinet, the role was fulfilled by the colonial era Executive Council on the island. Under the Constitution of Barbados, Cabinet is not prescribed a maximum number Cabinet of Ministers, however, it must have no fewer than five members. The first Cabinet of Barbados was led by Premier Sir Grantley Herbert Adams. The four other Ministers were:

- The Hon. Dr. H.G.H. Cummins (Member 1935–36; 1940–1961);
- The Hon. Mencea Ethereal Cox (later Sir Mencea, member 1944–1961; senator 1976–1981;
- The Hon. R. G. Mapp (later Sir Ronald, member 1946–1961; Senator 1976–1979);
- The Hon. C. E. Talma (later Sir Edwy, member 1944–1948; 1951–1976)

Between 30 November 1966 and 30 November 2021, after Barbados was granted independence, under a Westminster system of governance, the ceremonial head of state was Elizabeth II, Queen of Barbados (represented by the governor-general) while the office of the premier became the prime minister as it is now presently known. After Barbados transitioned to a republic on 30 November 2021, the Monarchy of Barbados was abolished along with the office of the governor-general with the governor-general's duties and powers transferring to the president of Barbados, who became head of state.

== Current ==
The following represents to current composition of ministers, following general elections on February 12, 2026.

Government Minister	Cabinet Positions
The Honourable Mia Mottley, SC, MP	Prime Minister Minister of Economic Affairs and Development Minister of National Security
The Honourable Santia Bradshaw, MP	Deputy Prime Minister; Minister of Environment, National Beautification and Fisheries
The Honourable Wilfred Abrahams, SC, MP	Senior Minister for Governance Attorney General
Senator Dr. The Most Honourable Jerome Walcott, FB, JP, MBBS, FRCS	Senior Minister coordinating Social and Environmental Policy with responsibility for Reform of the Social Sector
The Honourable Kerrie Symmonds, MP	Senior Minister for the Productive Sectors Minister of Energy, Business Development and Consumer Affairs
Senator The Honourable Christopher Sinckler	Senior Minister, Foreign Affairs and Foreign Trade
The Honourable Kirk Humphrey	Senior Minister coordinating Infrastructural Projects Minister of Transport and Works
The Honourable Gregory Nicholls, MP	Minister of Home Affairs and Information
The Honourable Indar Weir, MP	Minister of Public and Private Investment
The Honourable Ian Gooding-Edghill, MP	Minister of Tourism and International Transport
Senator The Honourable Lisa Cummins	Minister of Health and Wellness
The Honourable Michael Lashley, KC, MP	Minister of Legal Affairs and Criminal Justice
The Honourable Kay McConney, MP	Minister of the Public Service and Talent Development
The Honourable Christopher Gibbs, MP	Minister of Housing, Lands and Maintenance
The Honourable Adrian Forde, MP	Minister of People Empowerment and Elder Affairs
The Honourable Colin Jordan, MP	Minister of Labour, Social Security and Third Sector
Senator The Honourable Jonathan Reid	Minister of Innovation, Industry, Science and Technology
The Honourable Charles Griffith, MP	Minister of Sports and Community Empowerment
The Honourable Ryan Straughn, MP	Minister of Finance
Senator The Honourable Chad Blackman	Minister of Education Transformation
The Honourable Shantal Munro-Knight, MP, Ph.D	Minister of Agriculture, Food and Nutritional Security
The Honourable Sandra Husbands, MP	Minister of Technological and Vocational Training
The Honourable Trevor Prescod, MP	Minister in the Prime Minister's Office for Pan-African Affairs and Heritage
The Honourable Marsha K. Caddle, MP	Minister in the Prime Minister's Office for Economic Affairs and Planning

== List of Government Ministries, Ministers and Permanent Secretaries ==
Ministry	Minister Responsible	Permanent Secretary
Cabinet Office	The Honourable Mia Mottley, SC, MP (Prime Minister)	Ms. Selma Green, acting Cabinet Secretary
Prime Minister's Office	The Honourable Mia Mottley, SC, MP (Prime Minister) Dr. the Honourable William Fondleroy Duguid, JP, MP (Senior Minister in the Prime Minister's Office for Infrastructural Projects and Town Planning Matters) Senator The Honourable Shantal Munro-Knight, PhD (Minister in the Prime Minister's Office responsible for the Sustainable Development Goals, Commitment for Results and Culture)	The Most Honourable Alies Jordan, FB Ambassador Sandra Phillips (Special Assignment - Commitment For Results) Ms. Gabrielle Springer (Director General, Infrastructure)
Ministry of the Public Service	The Honourable Mia Mottley, SC, MP	Ms. Penelope Linton (acting) (Director General, Human Resources)
Ministry of Transport and Works	The Honourable Santia Bradshaw, M.P (Deputy Prime Minister)	Mr. Andrew Gittens
Ministry of Finance	The Honourable Mia Mottley, SC, MP The Honourable Ryan Straughn, M.P	Ms. Octavia Forde
Ministry of Economic Affairs and Investment	The Honourable Kay McConney, MP	Mr. Patrick McCaskie (acting)
Ministry of Foreign Affairs and Foreign Trade	The Honourable Kerrie Symmonds, M.P	Ambassador Joy-ann Skinner (acting)
Office of the Attorney General and Ministry of Legal Affairs	The Hon. Dale Marshall, SC, MP	Mr. Timothy Maynard
Ministry of Educational Transformation	Senator The Honourable Chad Blackman	Ms. Wendy Odle (acting)
Ministry of Training and Tertiary Education	The Honourable Sandra Husbands, MP	nil
Ministry of Home Affairs and Information	The Honourable Wilfred Abrahams, MP	Ms. Jenifer King (acting)
Ministry of Health and Wellness	Senator Dr. The Most Honourable Jerome Walcott, FB, JP, MBBS, FRCS	Mr. Wayne Marshall (acting)
Ministry of Agriculture and Food and Nutritional Security	The Honourable Indar Weir, MP	Mr. Terry Bascombe (acting)
Ministry of Labour, Social Security and Third Sector	The Honourable Colin Jordan, MP	Ms. Marva Howell (acting)
Ministry of Housing, Lands and Maintenance	The Honourable Dwight Sutherland, MP	Mr. H. Nikita Smith
Ministry of Energy and Business	Senator The Honourable Lisa Cummins	Mr. Kevin Hunte (acting)
Ministry of Tourism and International Transport	The Honourable Ian Gooding-Edghill, MP	Ms. Francine Blackman (acting) (Tourism) Mr. Charley Browne (acting) (International Transport)
Ministry of Youth, Sports and Community Empowerment	The Honourable Charles McDonald Griffith, MP	Ms. Joy Adamson (acting)
Ministry of People Empowerment and Elder Affairs	The Honourable Kirk Humphrey, MP	Mr. Jehu Wiltshire
Ministry of Environment and National Beautification, Green and Blue Economy	The Honourable Adrian Forde, MP	Ms. Yolande Howard
Ministry of Industry, Innovation, Science and Technology	Senator The Honourable Jonathan Reid	Ms. Claudette Hope-Greenidge (acting)

== By Administration ==
=== Mia Mottley 2022 Cabinet ===
==== Final Cabinet of the 2022-2027 Term ====
Government Minister	Cabinet Positions
The Honourable Mia Mottley, SC, MP	Prime Minister Minister of Finance Minister of National Security and the Public Service
The Honourable Santia Bradshaw, MP	Deputy Prime Minister; Minister of Transport and Works
The Honourable Dale Marshall, SC, MP	Senior Minister for Governance Attorney General and Minister of Legal Affairs
Senator Dr. The Most Honourable Jerome Walcott, FB, JP, MBBS, FRCS	Senior Minister coordinating Social and Environmental Policy with responsibility for Reform of the Social Sector
The Honourable Kerrie Symmonds, MP	Senior Minister for the Productive Sectors Minister of Foreign Affairs and Foreign Trade
Dr. The Honourable William Duguid, JP, MP	Senior Minister in the Prime Minister's Office responsible for Infrastructural Projects and Town Planning Matters
The Honourable Wilfred Abrahams, MP	Minister of Home Affairs and Information
The Honourable Indar Weir, MP	Minister of Agriculture and Food and Nutritional Security
The Honourable Ian Gooding-Edghill, MP	Minister of Tourism and International Transport
Senator The Honourable Lisa Cummins	Minister of Energy and Business
The Honourable Kay McConney, MP	Minister of Economic Affairs and Investment
The Honourable Dwight Sutherland, MP	Minister of Housing, Lands and Maintenance
The Honourable Kirk Humphrey	Minister of People Empowerment and Elder Affairs
The Honourable Adrian Forde, MP	Minister of Environment and National Beautification, Green and Blue Economy
The Honourable Colin Jordan, MP	Minister of Labour, Social Security and Third Sector
Senator The Honourable Jonathan Reid	Minister of Industry, Innovation, Science and Technology
The Honourable Charles Griffith, MP	Minister of Youth, Sports and Community Empowerment
The Honourable Ryan Straughn, MP	Minister in the Ministry of Finance
Senator The Honourable Chad Blackman	Minister of Educational Transformation
Senator The Honourable Shantal Munro-Knight, Ph.D	Minister in the Prime Minister's Office with responsibility for Sustainable Development, Commitment for Results and Culture
The Honourable Davidson Ishmael, MP	Minister of State in the Ministry of Health and Wellness
The Honourable Sandra Husbands, MP	Minister of Training and Tertiary Education

==== February 25, 2025 Reshuffle ====
The Honourable Marsha Caddle, MP and the Honourable Corey Lane, JP, MP both resigned from the Cabinet on January 25, 2025. As a consequence, the following changes were made.

Government Minister	Old Position	New Position
The Honourable Marsha Caddle, MP	Minister of Industry, Innovation, Science and Technology	not applicable
The Honourable Corey Lane, JP, MP	Minister of State in the Office of the Attorney General responsible for Crime Prevention	not applicable
Senator The Honourable Chad Blackman	Minister in the Ministry of Economic Affairs and Investment	Minister of Educational Transformation
The Honourable Sandra Husbands, MP	Minister of State in the Ministry of Education, Technological and Vocational Training	Minister of Training and Tertiary Education
The Honourable Kay McConney, MP	Minister of Education, Technological and Vocational Training	Minister of Economic Affairs and Investment
Senator The Honourable Jonathan Reid	not applicable	Minister of Industry, Innovation, Science and Technology

==== January 2024 Reshuffle ====
On January 6, 2024, the Prime Minister announced a Cabinet reshuffle with effect from January 8, 2024. The most notable change in the make up of Ministers comes with the resignation of Dr. Sonia Browne, MP. The details of the few changes are outlined below.

Government Minister	Old Position	New Position
The Honourable Marsha Caddle, MP	not applicable	Minister of Industry, Innovation, Science and Technology
The Honourable Davidson Ishmael, MP	Minister of Industry, Innovation, Science and Technology	Minister of State in the Ministry of Health and Wellness
Senator The Honourable Chad Blackman	not applicable	Minister in the Ministry of Economic Affairs and Investment
The Honourable Sandra Husbands, MP	Minister of State in the Ministries of Foreign Trade and Business	Minister of State in the Ministry of Education, Technological and Vocational Training

==== October 2022 Reshuffle ====
On October 22, 2022, the Prime Minister announced the following changes to the Ministers with effect from October 26, 2022. Mr. Corey Lane is the only person to receive a promotion, moving from Parliamentary Secretary to Minister.

Government Minister	Old Position	New Position
Senator Dr. The Most Honourable Jerome Walcott	Senior Minister coordinating social and environmental policy Minister of Foreign Affairs and Foreign Trade	Senior Minister coordinating social and environmental policy Minister of Health and Wellness
The Hon. Kerrie Symmonds	Senior Minister coordinating the productive sectors Minister of Energy and Business	Senior Minister coordinating productive sectors Minister of Foreign Affairs and Foreign Trade
Senator The Hon. Lisa Cummins	Minister of Tourism and International Transport	Minister of Energy and Business
The Hon. Ian Gooding-Edghill	Minister of Health and Wellness	Minister of Tourism and International Transport
Mr. Corey Lane, M.P	Parliamentary Secretary in the Ministry of People Empowerment and Elder Affairs	Minister of State in the Office of the Attorney General responsible for Crime Prevention

==== The Mia Mottley Cabinet ====
The below table is the original list of Ministers with effect from January 24, 2022 to October 26, 2022.

Government Minister	Cabinet Positions
The Hon. Mia Mottley	Prime Minister Minister of Finance, Economic Affairs and Investment Minister of National Security and the Public Service
The Hon. Santia Bradshaw	Deputy Prime Minister; Minister of Transport, Works and Water Resources
The Hon. Dale Marshall	Senior Minister for Governance Attorney General and Minister of Legal Affairs
Senator Dr. The Most Hon. Jerome Walcott	Senior Minister coordinating Social and Environmental Policy Minister of Foreign Affairs and Foreign Trade
The Hon. Kerrie Symmonds	Senior Minister for the Productive Sectors Minister of Energy and Business
Dr. The Hon. William Duguid	Senior Minister in the Prime Minister's Office responsible for Infrastructural Projects and Town Planning Matters
The Hon. Wilfred Abrahams	Minister of Home Affairs and Information
The Hon. Indar Weir	Minister of Agriculture and Food and Nutritional Security
The Hon. Ian Gooding-Edghill	Minister of Health and Wellness
Senator The Hon. Lisa Cummins	Minister of Tourism and International Transport
The Hon. Kay McConney	Minister of Education, Technological and Vocational Training
The Hon. Dwight Sutherland	Minister of Housing, Lands and Maintenance
The Hon. Kirk Humphrey	Minister of People Empowerment and Elder Affairs
The Hon. Adrian Forde	Minister of Environment and National Beautification
The Hon. Colin Jordan	Minister of Labour, Social Security and Third Sector
The Hon. Davidson Ishmael	Minister of Industry, Innovation, Science and Technology
The Hon. Charles McDonald Griffith	Minister of Youth, Sports and Community Empowerment
The Hon. Ryan Straughn	Minister in the Ministry of Finance and Economic Affairs
Senator Dr. The Hon. Shantal Munro-Knight	Minister in the Prime Minister's Office
Dr. The Hon. Sonia Browne	Minister of State in the Ministry of Health and Wellness
The Hon. Sandra Husbands	Minister of State in Foreign Trade and Business Development

=== Mia Mottley 2018 to 2022 Cabinet ===
==== The Mia Mottley Cabinet ====
===== Reassignments =====
With effect from August 30, 2021, the Hon. Peter Phillips was reassigned from Minister in the Ministry of Agriculture and Food Security to Minister in the Ministry of Housing, Lands and Maintenance alongside the Minister of Housing, Lands and Maintenance, the Hon. William Duguid.

===== July 2020 Reshuffle =====
On July 22, 2020 in a statement to the nation, the Prime Minister of Barbados, Mia Mottley, announced the following changes to take effect from July 23, 2020.

Government Minister	Cabinet Positions
Hon. Mia Mottley	Prime Minister Minister of Finance, Economic Affairs and Investment Minister of National Security and the Public Service
Hon. Santia Bradshaw	Minister of Education, Technological and Vocational Training
Hon. John King	Minister in the Office of the Prime Minister responsible for Culture and National Development
Hon. Marsha Caddle	Minister in the Ministry of Economic Affairs and Investment
Hon. Ryan Straughn	Minister in the Ministry of Finance
Hon. Dale Marshall	Attorney General and Minister of Legal Affairs
Sen. Dr. the Hon. Jerome Walcott	Minister of Foreign Affairs and Foreign Trade
Hon. Sandra Husbands	Minister in the Ministry of Foreign Trade
Lt. Col. the Hon. Jeffery Bostic	Minister of Health and Wellness
Dr. the Hon. William Duguid	Minister of Housing, Lands and Maintenance
Hon. Kerrie Symmonds	Minister of Energy, Small Business and Entrepreneurship
Hon. Cynthia Forde	Minister of People Empowerment and Elder Affairs
Sen. the Hon. Lisa Cummins	Minister of Tourism and International Transport
Hon. Wilfred Abrahams	Minister of Home Affairs, Information and Public Affairs
Hon. Ian Gooding-Edghill	Minister of Transport, Works and Water Resources
Hon. Charles Griffith	Minister in the Ministry of Water Resources
Hon. Adrian Forde	Minister of Environment and National Beautification
Hon. Colin Jordan	Minister of Labour and Social Partnership Relations
Hon. Ronald Toppin	Minister of International Business and Industry
Hon. Dwight Sutherland	Minister of Youth, Sports and Community Empowerment
Kirk Matthew Humphrey	Minister of Maritime Affairs and the Blue Economy
Hon. Indar Weir	Minister of Agriculture and Food Security
Hon. Peter Philips	Minister in the Ministry of Agriculture and Food Security
Sen. Hon. Kay McConney	Minister of Innovation, Science and Smart Technology

===== The Original Cabinet =====
The 26-member Cabinet announced by the Barbados Labour Party as of 26 May 2018:

Government Minister	Cabinet Positions
Hon. Mia Mottley Q.C. M.P.	Prime Minister and Minister of Finance, Economic Affairs and Investment
Hon. Dale Marshall Q.C. M.P.	Attorney General and Minister of Legal Affairs
Hon. Santia Bradshaw M.P.	Minister of Education, Technological and Vocational Training
Hon. George Payne Q.C. M.P.	Minister of Housing, Lands and Rural Development
Hon. Ronald Toppin M.P.	Minister of International Business and Industry
Senator Dr. the Hon. Jerome Walcott J.P	Minister of Foreign Affairs and Foreign Trade
Hon. Trevor Prescod JP M.P.	Minister of the Environment and National Beautification
Hon. Cynthia Forde JP M.P.	Minister of People Empowerment and Elder Affairs
Hon. Kerrie Simmonds M.P.	Minister of Tourism and International Transport
Hon. Dr. William Duguid JP M.P.	Minister of Transport, Works and Maintenance
Hon. Lt. Col. Jeffrey Bostic M.P.	Minister of Health and Wellness
Hon. Edmund Hinkson M.P.	Minister of Home Affairs
Hon. Dwight Sutherland M.P.	Minister of Small Business, Entrepreneurship and Commerce
Hon. Wilfred Abrahams M.P	Minister of Energy and Water Resources
Hon. Ryan Straughn M.P.	Minister in the Ministry of Finance
Hon. Marsha Caddle M.P.	Minister in the Ministry of Economic Affairs and Investment
Hon. C. Sandra Husbands M.P.	Minister in the Ministry of Foreign Trade
Hon. Colin Jordan M.P.	Minister of Labour and Social Partnership Relations
Hon. Charles Griffith M.P.	Minister in the Ministry of Housing, Lands and Rural Development
Hon. Adrian Forde M.P	Minister of Youth and Community Empowerment
Hon. Kirk Humphrey M.P	Minister of Maritime Affairs and the Blue Economy
Hon. Indar Weir M.P.	Minister of Agriculture and Food Security
Hon. Peter Philips M.P	Minister in the Ministry of Transport, Works and Maintenance
Hon. John King M.P	Minister of Creative Economy, Culture and Sports
Senator the Hon. Kay McConney	Minister of Innovation, Science and Smart Technology
Senator the Hon. Lucille Moe	Minister of Information, Broadcasting and Public Affairs

== Freundel Stuart 2015 Cabinet ==
The 18-member Cabinet announced by the Democratic Labour Party as of 3 July 2015:

Government Minister	Cabinet Positions
Hon. Freundel Stuart Q.C. M.P.	Prime Minister and Minister of National Security, the Public Service and Urban Development
Hon. Richard Sealy M.P.	Minister of Tourism and International Transport
Hon. Adriel Brathwaite M.P.	Attorney-General and Minister of Home Affairs
Hon. Christopher Sinckler M.P.	Minister of Finance and Economic Affairs
Hon. John Boyce M.P.	Minister of Health
Hon. Dr. David Estwick M.P.	Minister of Agriculture, Food, Fisheries, and Water Resource Management
Hon. Ronald Jones J.P. M.P.	Minister of Education, Science, Technology and Innovation
Hon. Dr. Denis Lowe M.P.	Minister of the Environment and Drainage
Hon. Donville Inniss M.P.	Minister of Industry, International Business, Commerce and Small Business Development
Hon. Denis Kellman M.P.	Minister of Housing, Lands and Rural Development
Sen. Dr. Esther R. Byer-Suckoo	Minister of Labour, Social Security and Human Resource Development
Hon. Steve Blackett M.P.	Minister of Social Care, Constituency Empowerment and Community Development
Hon. Michael Lashley M.P.	Minister of Transport and Works
Sen. Hon. Patrick Todd	Minister of State in the Prime Minister's Office
Sen. Maxine McClean	Minister of Foreign Affairs and Foreign Trade and Leader of Government Business in the Senate

== David Thompson 2008 Cabinet ==
The full Cabinet of the previous Barbados Government administration as of February 2006:

Government Minister	Cabinet Positions
Hon. David Thompson M.P.	Prime Minister and Minister of Finance, Economic Affairs and Development, Energy Labour and the Civil Service
Sen. the Hon. Maxine McClean	Minister of State in the Prime Minister's Office
Rt. Hon. Freundel Stuart, MP	Attorney General and Minister of Home Affairs
Hon. Christopher Sinckler, MP	Minister of Foreign Affairs, Foreign Trade and International Business
Dr. the Hon. David Estwick, MP	Minister of Health, National Insurance and Social Security
Hon. Ronald Jones, M.P	Minister of Education and Human Resource Development
Dr. the Hon. Dennis Lowe, M.P	Minister of Social Care, Constituency Empowerment and Urban Development
Hon. Patrick Todd M.P.	Minister of State, Ministry of Social Care, Constituency Empowerment and Urban Development
Hon. Richard Sealy, M.P	Minister of Tourism
Sen. the Hon. Haynesley Benn	Minister of Agriculture and Rural Development
Hon. George Hutson, M.P	Minister of Trade, Industry and Commerce
Hon. Michael Lashley M.P.	Minister of Housing and Lands
Dr. the Hon. Esther Byer-Suckoo, M.P	Minister of Family, Youth Affairs, Sport and Environment
Hon. Steven Blackett, M.P.	Minister of Community Development and Culture
Hon. John Boyce M.P.	Minister of Transport, Works and International Transport
Sen. the Hon. Darcy Boyce	Minister of State in the Prime Minister's Office with responsibility for Finance and Energy
Sen. the Hon. Arnie Walters	Minister of State in the Prime Minister's Office with responsibility for Employment, Labour Relations and The Social Partnership

In a reshuffle of his Cabinet late 2008, the following became the Cabinet until his passing.

Government Minister	Cabinet Positions
Hon. David Thompson, MP	Prime Minister and Minister of Finance & Investment, Labour, Civil Service & Energy
Hon. Fruendel Stuart, MP	Deputy Prime Minister, Attorney General, Minister of Home Affairs
Hon. George Hutson, MP	Minister of International Transport & International Business
Hon. David Estwick, MP	Minister of Economic Affairs & Empowerment, Innovation, Trade, Industry & Commerce
Hon. Dennis Lowe, MP	Minister of the Environment, Water Resources & Drainage
Hon. Donville Inniss, MP	Minister of Health
Hon. Christopher Sinkler, MP	Minister of Social Care, Constituency Empowerment, Rural & Urban Development
Hon. Esther Byer Suckoo, MP	Minister of Family, Youth Affairs & Sport
Hon. Ronald Jones, MP	Minister of Education & Human Resource Development
Hon. Michael Lashley, MP	Minister of Housing & Lands
Hon. Richard Sealy, MP	Minister of Tourism
Hon. Steve Blackett, MP	Minister Community Development & Culture
Hon. John Boyce, MP	Minister of Transport & Works
Sen. Hon. Haynesly Benn	Minister of Agriculture
Sen. Hon. Maxine McClean	Minister of Foreign Affairs and Foreign Trade
Hon. Patrick Todd, MP	Minister of State: Education & Human Resource Development
Sen. Hon. Darcy Boyce	Minister of State responsibly for Finance, Investment, Telecommunications & Energy
Sen. Hon. Arnie Walters	Minister of State responsible for Labour & Immigration
Sen. Irene Sandiford Garner	Parliamentary Secretary in the Prime Minister’s Office

== Owen Arthur 2006 Cabinet ==
The full Cabinet of the previous Barbados Government administration as of February 2006:

Government Minister	Cabinet Positions
Rt. Hon. Owen S. Arthur M.P.	Prime Minister and Minister of Finance
Hon. Mia Mottley QC, M.P.	Deputy Prime Minister & Minister of Economic Affairs and Development
Hon. Dame Billie A. Miller DBE, D.A., BCH, M.P.	Senior Minister and Minister of Foreign Affairs and Foreign Trade
Hon. Noel A. Lynch M.P.	Minister of Tourism and International Transport
Hon. H. Elizabeth Thompson M.P.	Minister of Energy and the Environment
Hon. Rawle C. Eastmond JP, M.P.	Minister of Labour and Civil Service
Hon. Dr. Jerome X. Walcott JP, M.P.	Minister of Health
Hon. Reginald Farley JP, M.P.	Minister of Housing and Lands
Senator Hon. Lynette Eastmond.	Minister of Commerce, Consumer Affairs and Business Development
Hon. Dale D. Marshall M.P.	Attorney General & Minister of Home Affairs
Hon. Gline A. Clarke J.P., M.P.	Minister of Public Works
Hon. Trevor Prescod M.P.	Minister of Social Transformation
Senator Hon. Erskine Griffith GCM, JP	Minister of Agriculture and Rural Development
Hon. Joseph J.S. Atherley JP, M.P.	Minister of State in the Prime Minister's Office
Hon. Anthony P. Wood JP, M.P.	Minister of Education, Youth Affairs, and Sports
Hon. Cynthia Y. Forde JP, M.P.	Minister of State in the Ministry of Education
Hon. Clyde A. Mascoll M.P	Minister of State in the Ministry of Finance
Hon. Kerrie D. Symmonds M.P	Minister of State in the Ministry of Foreign Affairs and Foreign Trade

== See also ==
- Table of precedence for Barbados
- President of Barbados
- Monarchy of Barbados
- Governor-General of Barbados
- Executive Council (Commonwealth countries)
- Representatives to the United Nations

=== External links ===
- Cabinet Ministers of the Government of Barbados
- Site of the Democratic Labour Party
- Site of the Barbados Labour Party
- Parliament of Barbados Official Site
