= Ministry of Foreign Affairs, Foreign Trade and International Business (Barbados) =

Government ministry of Barbados

The Ministry of Foreign Affairs and Foreign Trade of Barbados is a key Barbadian government agency responsible for regulating, maintaining, and developing Barbados's external relations and the nature of trading with foreign countries. The Ministry is also responsible for the country's representation at the United Nations and advises other Ministries and State authorities when the latter have dealings with foreign governments or institutions. It is based on Culloden Road, in the nation's capital Bridgetown.

== Departments ==
- Africa, Asia, Europe Division
- Americas-Hemispheric Division
- Caribbean Affairs and CARICOM Division
- Consular and Diaspora Division
- Protocol and Conferences Division
- Human Resource and Administration Division
- Multilateral Division
- Strategic Analysis Unit

== Foreign ministers of Barbados ==
The following is a list of foreign ministers of Barbados since 1966:

No.	Tenure	Portrait	Name (Birth–Death)	Notes
1	1966–1971		Errol Barrow (1920–1987)	
2	1971–1972		James Cameron Tudor (1919–1995)	1st appointment
3	1972–1976		George Moe (1932–2004)	
4	1976–1981		Henry Forde (1933–2024)	
5	1981–1985		Louis Tull (1938–)	
6	1985–1986		Nigel Ainsley Barrow (1937–2026)	
(2)	1986–1989		James Cameron Tudor (1919–1995)	2nd appointment
7	1989–1993		Maurice King (1936–2021)	
8	1993–1994		Branford Taitt (1938–2013)	
9	1994–2008		Billie Miller (1944–)	
10	2008		Christopher Sinckler (1967–)	
11	2008–2018		Maxine McClean (?–)	
12	2018–2022		Jerome Walcott (1957–)	
13	2022–2026		Kerrie Drurard Symmonds (1966–)	
(2)	2026–present		Christopher Sinckler (1967–)	2nd appointment

== See also ==
- List of ambassadors and high commissioners to and from Barbados
- Cabinet of Barbados
- List of prime ministers of Barbados
- List of current foreign ministers
- List of current permanent representatives to the United Nations (Barbadian representatives)
- Barbados v. Trinidad and Tobago
