= Saint Michael North (Barbados Parliament constituency) =

Parliamentary constituency in Barbados

- Constituency for the House of Assembly of Barbados
- Region: Saint Michael, Barbados

Current constituency
- Created: 1971

Saint Michael North is a constituency in the Saint Michael parish of Barbados. It was established in 1971. Since 2022, it has been represented in the House of Assembly of the Barbadian Parliament by Davidson Ishmael, a member of the BLP. (Note: As with all constituencies, the constituency elects one member of parliament (MP) by the first past the post system of election at least every five years.) The Saint Michael North constituency is a safe seat for the BLP.

== Boundaries ==
The constituency runs:

From the junction of Cave Hill Road with St. Stephens Hill Road in a southerly direction along the middle of St. Stephens Hill Road to its junction with Grazettes New Road; thence in an easterly direction along the middle of Grazettes New Road to its junction with Pembroke Road; thence in a north easterly direction along the middle of Pembroke Road to its junction with Denton Road; thence in a westerly direction and then north easterly and easterly direction along the middle of Denton Road to its junction with Brecon Road; thence in an easterly direction along the middle of Brecon Road to its junction with Rockhampton Road; thence in a northerly direction along the middle of Rockhampton Road to its junction with a flight of steps; thence in a north westerly direction along this flight of steps to the roadway; thence in a northerly direction along the roadway to its junction with Cave Hill-Whitehall Road; thence in a north easterly and then easterly direction along the middle of the Cave Hill-Whitehall Road to its junction with Whitehall No. 1 Road; thence in a north easterly direction along the middle of Whitehall No. 1 Road to its junction with Whitehall Tenantry Road; thence in a north easterly direction along the middle of Whitehall Tenantry Road to its junction with Johnson Land Tenantry Road; thence in an easterly and north easterly direction along Johnson Land Tenantry Road 2nd Avenue Green Hill to its junction with 4th Avenue Green Hill; thence in an easterly direction along the middle of 4th Avenue Green Hill to its junction with Highway 2 (the Bridgetown-Warrens Road); thence in a north easterly direction along the middle of Highway 2 to its junction at the Everton Weekes Roundabout with the Gordon Cummins Highway; thence in a westerly direction along the Gordon Cummins Highway to its junction with the Ronald Mapp Highway; thence in a northerly direction along the middle of the Ronald Mapp Highway to its junction with the Clermont-Husbands Road; thence in a westerly direction along the middle of the Clermont-Husbands Road to its junction with the Husbands-Cave Hill Road; thence in a southerly direction along the middle of the Husbands-Cave Hill Road to its junction at Cave Hill with the St. Stephens Hill Road (the starting point).

== Members ==
Election	Member	Party
2018	Ronald Toppin	BLP
2022	Davidson Ishmael	BLP

== Elections ==
=== 2022 ===
St. Michael North
Party	Candidate	Votes	%	±%
BLP	Davidson Ishmael	2,394	71.5	−0.8
DLP	Ricardo Harrison	754	22.5	−0.8
APP	Maria Phillips	201	6.0	+4.0
Majority		1,640	49.0	−0.1
Turnout		3,349		
BLP hold		Swing	0.0	

=== 2018 ===
St. Michael North
Party	Candidate	Votes	%	±%
BLP	Ronald Toppin	3,518	72.3	+20.8
DLP	Kim Tudor	1,132	23.3	−24.4
UPP	Maria Phillips	99	2.0	new
SB	Angela Gibbs	72	1.5	new
People's Democratic Congress	Mark Adamson	27	0.6	−0.2
Independent	Lesloyed Bishop	15	0.3	new
Majority		2,386	49.1	+45.3
Turnout		4,863		
BLP hold		Swing	+22.6	
