= Saint George South (Barbados Parliament constituency) =

Parliamentary constituency in Barbados

- Constituency for the House of Assembly of Barbados
- Region: Saint George, Barbados

Current constituency
- Created: 1971

Saint George South is a constituency in the Saint George parish of Barbados. It was established in 1971. Since 2018, it has been represented in the House of Assembly of the Barbadian Parliament by Dwight Sutherland, a member of the BLP. (Note: As with all constituencies, the constituency elects one member of parliament (MP) by the first past the post system of election at least every five years.) The Saint George South constituency is a safe seat for the BLP.

== Boundaries ==
The constituency runs:

From the junction of Highway 4 (the Bridgetown-Bulkeley Road) with ButtalsSt. George’s Church Road at Turnpike in a westerly direction along the middle of Highway 4 to the Roundabout on the Constant-Dash Valley Road; thence in a southerly, westerly, and then southerly direction along the middle of the Dash Valley Road to its junction with Highway 5 (the Bridgetown-Windsor Road) at Hanson Hill; thence in an easterly direction along the middle of Highway 5 to its junction with the Egerton-St. Davids Road; thence in a southerly direction along the middle of the Egerton-St. Davids Road to its junction with the St. Davids-Ridge Road; thence in a westerly direction along the St. Davids-Ridge Road to its junction with Highway V (the St. Davids-Bannatyne Road) thence in an easterly direction to its junction with the Bannatyne-Small Ridge Plantation Road; thence in a northerly, westerly, then northerly direction along the middle of the plantation road to its junction with the St. Davids-Edeys-Ridge Road; thence in an easterly direction along the middle of the St. Davids-Edeys-Ridge Road to its junction with the Ridge-Lower Greys Road; thence in a northerly direction along the middle of the Ridge-Lower Greys Road to its junction with Highway 5 (Windsor-Bridgetown Road); thence in an easterly direction along the middle of the Windsor-Bridgetown Road to its junction with the Edgecumbe-Ebenezer Road; thence in a northerly direction along the middle of the Edgecumbe-Ebenezer Road to its junction with a pathway leading from Edgecumbe to Highway 4B (the Frenches-Chapel Road); thence in an easterly direction along the middle of Highway 4B to the point which it crosses the gully running to Woodland; thence in a north westerly direction along the gully to a point which is marked by a monument (B.12); thence continuing in a north westerly direction along the gully to the centre of the culvert on Highway 4 (the Woodland-Kendal Road); thence in a westerly direction along the middle of Highway 4 to its junction with the Woodland-Four Roads Road; thence in a northerly direction along the middle of the Woodland-Four Roads Road to its junction with the Todds-Ellesmere Road; thence in a westerly direction along the middle of the Todds-Ellesmere Road to its junction with the Ellesmere-St. Judes-Newbury Road; thence along the middle of the St. Judes-Newbury Road to its junction with Highway X; thence in a southerly direction along Highway X to its junction with the Workmans-Retreat Road; thence in an easterly direction along the middle of the Workmans-Retreat Road to its junction with the Jordans-Free Hill Road; thence in a southerly direction along the middle of the Jordans-Free Hill Road to its junction with the St. George’s Church-Buttals Road; thence in a south easterly direction along the middle of the St. George’s Church-Buttals Road to its junction with Highway 4 at the Turnpike (the starting point).

== Members ==
Election	Member	Party
2018	Dwight Sutherland	BLP
2022	Dwight Sutherland	BLP

== Elections ==
=== 2022 ===
St. George South
Party	Candidate	Votes	%	±%
BLP	Dwight Sutherland	3,673	72.8	−6.5
DLP	Dawn Marie Armstrong	1,143	22.7	+6.4
APP	Everton Holligan	151	3.0	+2.0
SB	Alison Weekes	76	1.5	−1.4
Majority		2,530	50.2	−12.9
Turnout		5,043		
BLP hold		Swing	-6.4	

=== 2018 ===
St. George South
Party	Candidate	Votes	%	±%
BLP	Dwight Sutherland	5,363	79.3	+24.2
DLP	Esther Byer-Suckoo	1,100	16.3	−28.6
SB	Andrew Banfield	193	2.9	new
UPP	Craig Harewood	69	1.0	new
Barbados Integrity Movement	Doris Ramratty-Barrow	34	0.5	new
Majority		4,263	63.1	+52.8
Turnout		6,759		
BLP hold		Swing	+26.4	
