= Christ Church West Central (Barbados Parliament constituency) =

Parliamentary constituency in Barbados

Christ Church West Central is a constituency in the Christ Church parish of Barbados. It was established in 1981. Since 2018, it has been represented in the House of Assembly of the Barbadian Parliament by Adrian Forde, a member of the BLP. (Note: As with all constituencies, the constituency elects one member of parliament (MP) by the first past the post system of election at least every five years.) Christ Church West Central has largely leaned towards the BLP.

== Boundaries ==
The constituency runs:

From the junction of Sargeants Village Tenantry Road with Highway 6 (Bridgetown-Sargeants Village Road) in an easterly direction along the middle of Highway 6; thence in a southerly direction along the middle of Highway 6 to its junction with Vauxhall Road; thence in an easterly direction along the middle of the Vauxhall Road to its junction with the Bannatyne-Kingsland Road junction; thence in a southerly direction along the middle of the Bannatyne-Kingsland Road to its junction with the ABC highway; thence across the ABC Highway, thence in a south easterly direction along the middle of the Kingsland-Gall Hill Road to its junction with the Water Street Road; thence in an easterly direction along the middle of the Water Street Road to its junction with Highway T (the Lodge Road-Oistins Hill Road); thence in a southerly direction along the middle of Highway T to its junction with the Church Hill Road; thence in an easterly direction along the middle of the Church Hill Road to its junction with Windy Ridge; thence in a south easterly direction along the middle of Windy Ridge to its junction with Highway 7 (the OistinsAirport Road); thence in a westerly direction along the middle of Highway 7 to the junction of Church Road; thence in a westerly direction along the middle of Church Road, to its junction at Oistins Hill with the Cane Vale-Maxwell Hill Road; thence in a westerly direction along the middle of the Cane Vale-Maxwell Hill Road to its junction with the Graeme Hall Terrace-Maxwell Hill Road; thence in a north westerly direction along the middle of the Graeme Hall Terrace Road to its junction with the Errol Barrow Highway (opposite the Ministry of Agriculture); thence in a northerly direction along the middle of the Errol Barrow Highway to its junction with the Errol Barrow Roundabout; thence in a westerly direction along the middle of the ABC Highway to a point south of the western boundary of Lot #29 Tino Terrace, Graeme Heights; thence in a northerly direction along the western boundary of Tino Terrace-Warners Gardens Development; thence to the northern boundary of Lot #53 Warners Gardens; thence in an easterly direction along the northern boundary of Warners Gardens to a point where it meets the southern terminus of Brownes Road (at Lot #76 Warners Gardens) thence in a northerly direction along the middle of Brownes Road-Sargeants Village Tenantry Road to its junction with Highway 6 (the starting point).

== Members ==
Election	Member	Party
2018	Adrian Forde	BLP
2022	Adrian Forde	BLP

== Elections ==
=== 2022 ===
Christ Church West Central
Party	Candidate	Votes	%	±%
BLP	Adrian Forde	2,673	71.9	−2.4
DLP	Rennette Dimmott	695	18.7	−2.9
APP	Belfield Belgrave	184	5.0	+4.1
SB	Kenneth Lewis	164	4.4	+1.2
Majority		1,978	53.2	+0.5
Turnout		3,716		
BLP hold		Swing	+0.2	
