= Saint Michael West Central (Barbados Parliament constituency) =

Parliamentary constituency in Barbados

- Constituency for the House of Assembly of Barbados
- Region: Saint Michael, Barbados

Current constituency
- Created: 1981

Saint Michael West Central is a constituency in the Saint Michael parish of Barbados. It was established in 1981. Since 2022, it has been represented in the House of Assembly of the Barbadian Parliament by Ian Gooding-Edghill, a member of the BLP. (Note: As with all constituencies, the constituency elects one member of parliament (MP) by the first past the post system of election at least every five years.) The Saint Michael West Central constituency is a safe seat for the BLP.

== Boundaries ==
The constituency runs:

From the junction of Long Gap with Spooners Hill-Tudor Bridge Road in a southerly direction along the middle of Spooners Hill-Tudor Bridge Road to its junction with the Bank Hall Cross Road and Highway 1 (the Bridgetown-Holetown Road) at Eagle Hall Corner; thence along the middle of Highway 1 to its junction with St. Stephens Hill Road; thence along the middle of St. Stephens Hill Road to its junction with Grazettes New Road; thence along the middle of Grazettes New Road to its junction with Pembroke Road; thence in an easterly direction along the middle of Pembroke Road to its junction with Denton Road; thence in a northerly direction along the middle of Denton Road to its junction with Ulster Road; thence in a westerly direction along the middle of Denton Road to its junction with Brecon Road and Rockhampton Road; thence in an easterly direction along the middle of Brecon Road to its junction with Long Gap Grazettes Road; thence along the middle of Long Gap Grazettes Road to its junction with Spooners Hill-Tudor Bridge Road (the starting point).

== Members ==
Election	Member	Party
2018	George Gooding-Edghill	BLP
2022	Ian Gooding-Edghill	BLP

== Elections ==
=== 2022 ===
St. Michael West Central
Party	Candidate	Votes	%	±%
BLP	Ian Gooding-Edghill	2,420	72.9	−2.7
DLP	Curtis Cave	795	23.9	+4.0
SB	Angela Edey	64	1.9	−1.0
APP	Veronica Price	30	0.9	+0.2
BFP	David Roberts	11	0.3	New
Majority		1,625	48.9	−6.8
Turnout		3,320		
BLP hold		Swing	-3.3	

=== 2018 ===
St. Michael West Central
Party	Candidate	Votes	%	±%
BLP	George Gooding-Edghill	3,291	75.6	+29.0
DLP	James Paul	865	19.9	−31.1
SB	Angela Edey	125	2.9	new
Barbados Integrity Movement	Steven Belgrave	46	1.1	new
UPP	Herman Lowe	29	0.7	new
Majority		2,426	55.7	+51.3
Turnout		4,356		
BLP gain from DLP		Swing	+30.0	
