= Saint James North (Barbados Parliament constituency) =

Parliamentary constituency in Barbados

- Constituency for the House of Assembly of Barbados
- Region: Saint James, Barbados

Current constituency
- Created: 1981

Saint James North is a constituency in the Saint James parish of Barbados. It was established in 1981. Since 2018, it had been represented in the House of Assembly of the Barbadian Parliament by Chad Blackman, a member of the BLP, who replaced Edmund Hinkson who resigned in 2025. (Note: As with all constituencies, the constituency elects one member of parliament (MP) by the first past the post system of election at least every five years.) The Saint James North constituency is a safe seat for the BLP.

== Boundaries ==
The Saint James North constituency runs:

From the outlet of the Scantlebury River on the western sea coast and along the Speightstown southern and then eastern boundary to the point crossed by Farm Road; thence in a northerly direction along the Speightstown eastern boundary to its junction with Highway 1 at Oban; thence along the Ashton Hall Road to its junction with the Ronald Mapp Highway; thence along the middle of the Ronald Mapp Highway in a southerly direction to its junction with the public road leading to Black Bess and Rock Hall; then in a generally south easterly direction along this road to the junction with the unclassified road leading to Black Bess and Mangrove Plantations; thence in a south easterly direction along this road to the point where it forks; thence in an easterly direction (passing the south of Mangrove Plantation) to the end of the road and then continuing in an easterly direction along the plantation track to the point in the centre of the track opposite the monument (B.4) placed on the southern side of the track; thence in a southerly direction in a straight line joining this point to the centre of the old mill wall at Springhead; thence in a southerly direction in a straight line to a point in the Springhead-Westmoreland Gully, 325 metres south of Springhead Plantation; thence in a westerly direction along the Springhead-Westmoreland Gully to the point at which it is crossed by the Ronald Mapp Highway; thence in a southerly direction along the middle of the Ronald Mapp Highway to its junction with Highway C (the Apes Hill-Trents Road); thence in a westerly direction along the Highway C to its junction with Highway 1 (the Bridgetown-Speightstown Road); thence in a westerly direction to a point on the sea coast; thence in a northerly direction along the seacoast to the outlet of the Scantlebury River (the starting point).

== Members ==
Election	Member	Party
2018	Edmund Hinkson	BLP
2022	Edmund Hinkson	BLP
2025 by-election	Chad Blackman	BLP

== Elections ==
=== 2022 ===
St. James North
Party	Candidate	Votes	%	±%
BLP	Edmund Hinkson	2,536	80.7	−3.0
DLP	Charles Worrell	608	19.3	+6.0
Majority		1,928	61.3	−9.1
Turnout		3,144		
BLP hold		Swing	-4.5	

=== 2018 ===
St. James North
Party	Candidate	Votes	%	±%
BLP	Edmund Hinkson	3,716	83.7	+29.1
DLP	Harcourt Husbands	592	13.3	−32.0
SB	David Waldron	76	1.7	new
UPP	Granville Cobham	54	1.2	new
Majority		3,124	70.4	+61.1
Turnout		4,438		
BLP hold		Swing	+30.6	
