= Jonathan Reid =

Jonathan Reid may refer to:

- Jonathan Reid (boxer) (born 1972), American boxer
- Jonathan Reid (politician) (born 1982), Barbadian politician
- Jonathan Reid, protagonist of video game Vampyr

== See also ==
- Jonny Reid (born 1983), New Zealand racing driver
- Foxx (rapper) (Jonathan Reed, born 1984), American rapper
