= Saint Michael South (Barbados Parliament constituency) =

Parliamentary constituency in Barbados

- Constituency for the House of Assembly of Barbados
- Region: Saint Michael, Barbados

Current constituency
- Created: 1971

Saint Michael South is a constituency in the Saint Michael parish of Barbados. It was established in 1971. Since 2022, it has been represented in the House of Assembly of the Barbadian Parliament by Kirk Matthew Humphrey, a member of the BLP. (Note: As with all constituencies, the constituency elects one member of parliament (MP) by the first past the post system of election at least every five years.) The Saint Michael South constituency is a safe seat for the BLP.

== Boundaries ==
The constituency runs:

From a point on the western sea coast west of the junction of Highway 7 (the Bridgetown-Oistins Road) with Beckles Road along a straight line to the junction of Highway 7 with Beckles Road; thence along the middle of Beckles Road to its junction with Old Quarry Road; thence in a northerly direction along the middle of Old Quarry Road with its junction at Bayview Avenue; thence in an easterly direction along the middle of Bayview Avenue to its junction with Watermill Place; thence in a northerly direction along the middle of Watermill Place to its junction with St. Paul’s Avenue; thence along a straight line to the Culloden Farm-Roseneath southern boundary wall; thence in an easterly direction along the CullodenFarm-Roseneath southern boundary wall to its junction with Culloden Road; thence in a northerly direction along the middle of Culloden Road to its junction with Highway 6 (Bridgetown-Collymore Rock Road); thence in an easterly direction along the middle of Highway 6 to its junction with Brittons Cross Road; thence in a southerly direction along the middle of Brittons Cross Road to its junction with Laynes Road; thence in an easterly direction along the middle of Laynes Road to its junction with Villa Road; thence in a northerly direction to its junction with Beales Gap; thence easterly along the middle of Beales Gap to its junction with Warner’s Gap; thence easterly along the middle of Warners Gap to its junction with Reece Road and the Storm Signal Station pathway; thence along the middle of the Storm Signal Station pathway to Flagstaff Road; thence in a south easterly direction along the middle of Flagstaff Road to its junction with Brittons New Road; thence in a westerly direction along the middle of Brittons New Road to its junction with Reservoir Road; thence southerly along the middle of Reservoir Road to the Ridge and using an imaginary line continue over and beyond the Ridge to 1st Avenue Dayrells Road; thence southerly along the middle of 1st Avenue Dayrells Road to its junction with Dayrells Road; thence westerly along the middle of Dayrells Road to the Garrison Road; thence in a south westerly direction along the middle of the Garrison Road to its junction with Highway 7 (Bridgetown-Hastings Road); then directly across Highway 7 and continuing in a south westerly direction along the road leading to Gravesend Beach and directly to the sea; thence in a north westerly and then northerly direction along the sea coast to a point on the western sea coast west of the junction of Highway 7 with Beckles Road (the starting point)..

== Members ==
Election	Member	Party
2018	Kirk Matthew Humphrey	BLP
2022	Kirk Matthew Humphrey	BLP
2026	Kirk Matthew Humphrey	BLP

== Elections ==
=== 2022 ===
St. Michael South
Party	Candidate	Votes	%	±%
BLP	Kirk Humphrey	2,200	74.3	+4.3
DLP	Kevin Miller	605	20.4	−5.1
BFP	Alex Mitchell	59	2.0	+1.3
APP	Irvin Belgrave	58	2.0	+0.7
SB	Patricia Cox	41	1.4	−1.1
Majority		1,595	53.8	+9.8
Turnout		2,963		
BLP hold		Swing	+4.7	

=== 2018 ===
St. Michael South
Party	Candidate	Votes	%	±%
BLP	Kirk Humphery	2,969	70.0	+35.3
DLP	Freundel Stuart	1,083	25.5	−38.7
SB	Paul Gibson	104	2.5	new
UPP	Sandra Corbin	57	1.3	new
Bajan Free Party	Alex Mitchell	31	0.7	−0.5
Majority		1,886	44.4	+14.9
Turnout		4,244		
BLP gain from DLP		Swing	+37.0	
