= Maxine McClean =

Barbadian politician

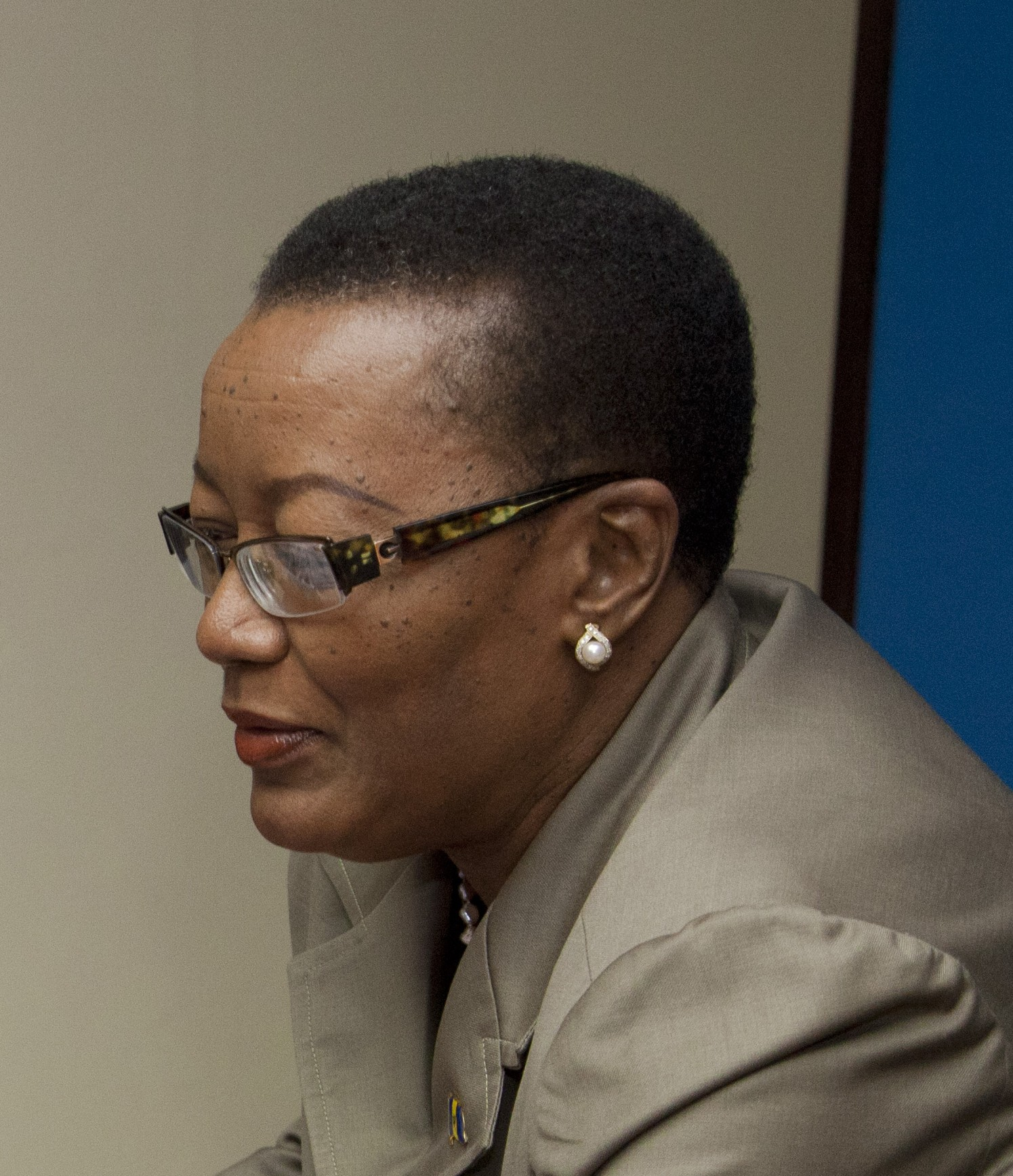

Minister of Foreign Affairs
- In office January 2008 – May 2018
- Prime Minister: David Thompson; Freundel Stuart
- Preceded by: Christopher Sinckler
- Succeeded by: Jerome Walcott

Personal details
- Party: Democratic Labour Party
- Education: University of the West Indies; Ohio University; Louisiana State University

Maxine Pamela Ometa McClean is a Barbadian politician who served as her country's Minister of Foreign Affairs from 2008 to 2018.

== Biography ==
McClean is a graduate of the University of the West Indies. While she was there she received second class honors in Public Administration. McClean was also a lecturer in the Department of Management Studies. In 1999, she established her own consulting firm.

A few years later, in January 2008, Maxine was invited to join the Barbados Cabinet as a minister in the Prime Minister's office. Eleven months after this, she was appointed Minister of Foreign Affairs and Foreign Trade. McClean opened a new embassy in Brazil and appointed Yvette Goddard as the first ambassador of Barbados to Brazil in 2009. In the same year she addressed the General Assembly of the United Nations. In 2010 McClean opened Barbados' mission to Beijing, China, where Sir Lloyd Erskine Sandiford served as the first resident Ambassador to that country.

== See also ==
- List of foreign ministers in 2017
- List of current foreign ministers

Political offices
Preceded by Christopher Sinckler	Foreign Minister of Barbados; 2008–2018	Succeeded by Jerome Walcott
