= Nigel Barrow =

Barbadian politician

Nigel Ainsley Barrow (14 February 1937 – 18 November 2026) was a Barbadian politician. He was the Minister of Foreign Affairs of Barbados from 1985 to 1986.

Barrow died on 18 November 2026, at the age of 89.
