= Indar Weir =

Barbadian politician (born 1961)

Indar Anthony Weir (born 19 April 1961 in Saint Philip, Barbados) is a Barbadian politician, businessman and cabinet minister in the government of Mia Mottley. He is the current minister of Agriculture and Food Security in the Mia Mottley administration.

== Early life and education ==
Weir was born on April 19, 1961, in Saint Philip, Barbados. He attended the St. Philip Boys’ School in Saint Philip, where he finished his primary school. After his primary education, he attended Cooperative High School and obtained his high school leaving certificate. He attended University of the West Indies, where he studied Business Administration and obtained a BSc and subsequently obtained EMBA from the same institution.

== Career ==
Weir is the chairman of Indar Weir Travel Centre in Barbados. In 2013, he ran for member of parliament in the 2013 general elections of Barbados. He failed to meet the required number of votes. In the 2018 Barbadian general elections, he was elected Member of Parliament of Barbados representing Saint Philip South constituency. He replaced Attorney General Adriel Brathwaite.

Weir was appointed Minister of Agriculture and Food Security in the Mia Mottley administration.
