= Jonathan Reid (politician) =

Barbadian politician

Minister of Innovation, Industry, Science and Technology
- Incumbent
- Assumed office 26 February 2025

Member of the Senate of Barbados
- Incumbent
- Assumed office 26 February 2025

Personal details
- Born: 1982 (age 43–44) Saint Lucia
- Party: Barbados Labour Party

Jonathan Reid (born 1982) is a Barbadian politician who has served as Minister of Innovation, Industry, Science and Technology since 2025.

== Career ==
In February 2025, he was appointed as a senator. He was sworn in as Minister of Innovation, Industry, Science and Technology. After the 2026 Barbadian general election, he returned to the Cabinet of Barbados by Mia Mottley.

== See also ==
- List of members of the House of Assembly of Barbados
