= Saint Michael, Barbados =

Parish of Barbados

Saint Michael
- Parish
- Map of Barbados showing Saint Michael
- Coordinates: 13°07′05″N 59°36′11″W
- Country: Barbados
- Largest city: Bridgetown

Government
  - Type: Parliamentary democracy
  - Parliamentary seats: 11

Area
  - Total: 39 km^{2} (15 sq mi)

Population (2026 census)
  - Total: 107,453
  - Density: 2,800/km^{2} (7,100/sq mi)
- ISO 3166 code: BB-08

The parish of St. Michael is one of 11 parishes in Barbados. It has a land area of 39 km^{2} (15 sq mi) and is at the southwest portion of the island. Saint Michael was the name of one of the original six parishes created in 1629 by Governor Sir William Tufton; its boundaries have been changed over time.

The parish is home to Bridgetown, the capital of Barbados. Bridgetown is the center of commercial activity in Barbados, as well as a central hub for the public transport network. Other major infrastructure in St. Michael is the international seaport of Barbados—the Deep Water Harbour. Therein, a number of cruise ships arrive and depart including various lines such as Royal Caribbean and Cunard. The harbour features several sugar towers for loading locally produced sugar into transport ships, and a tower for loading flour for transport.

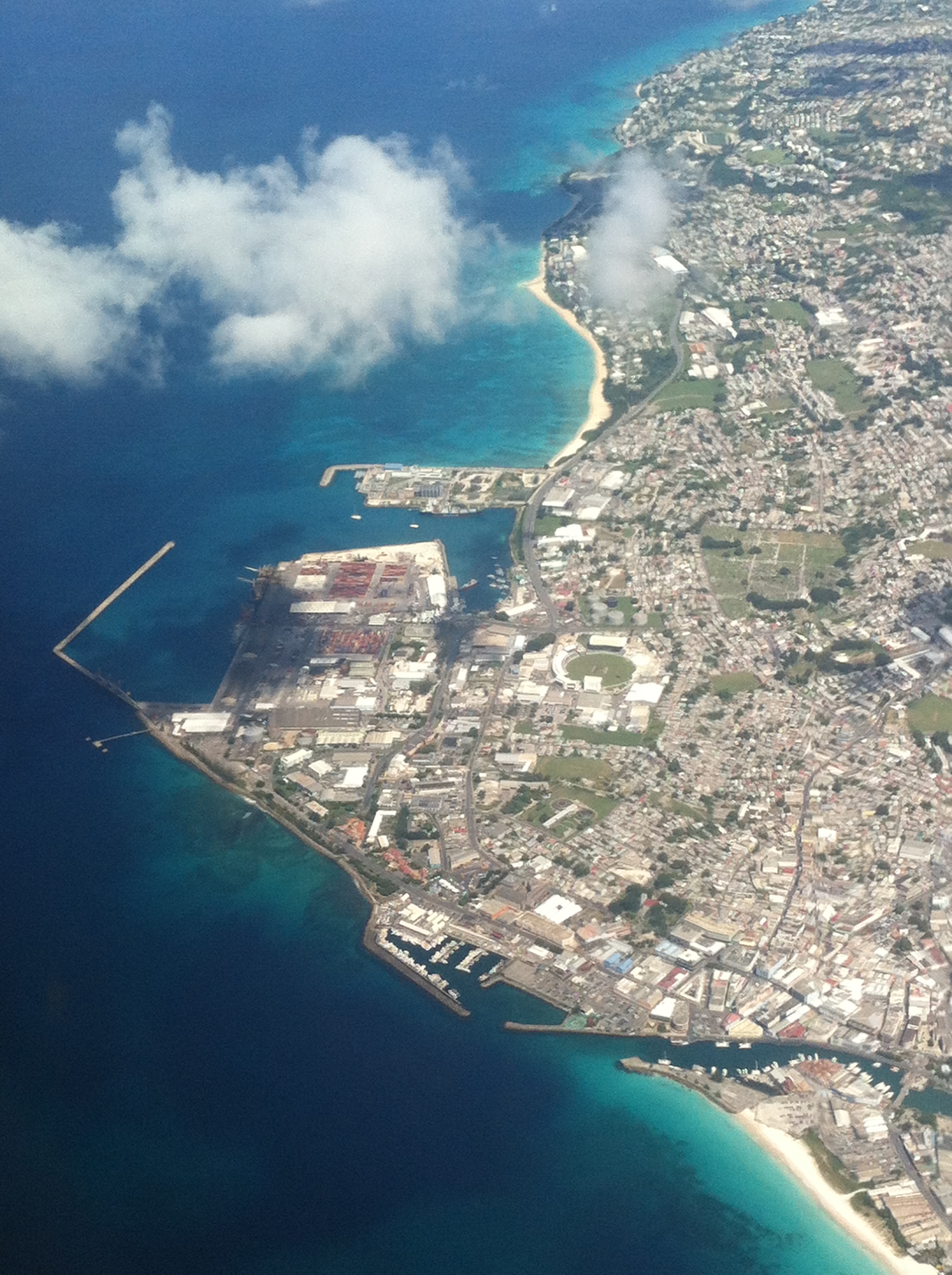
Aerial view of Bridgetown

The Needham's Point Lighthouse and Charles Fort are both located in Needham's Point, Saint Michael, behind the Hilton Barbados Resort.

Under Barbados's historical vestry system, the main parish church (St Michael's Cathedral) is sited in St Michael's Row in Bridgetown. The cathedral replaced the former parish church that was located at the site of St Mary's Church. St Michael's Cathedral was elevated to cathedral status under Bishop Coleridge, who arrived in Barbados in 1825 to head the newly created Diocese of Barbados and the Leeward Islands.

== Geography ==
=== Populated places ===
The parish contains the following towns, villages, localities, settlements, communities and hamlets:

- Black Rock
- Bridgetown
- Cave Hill
- Fontabelle
- Goodland
- Pine Hill
- Two Mile Hill
- Wanstead
- Warrens
- Weymouth
- Wildey

=== Parishes bordering Saint Michael ===
- Christ Church - South
- Saint George - East
- Saint James - Northwest
- Saint Thomas - Northeast

=== Defined boundaries ===
- With Christ Church: – Starts from the meeting point of the parishes of St. George, St. Michael, and Christ Church and proceeds southerly along the plantation track and the boundary between the residential developments called Fort George Heights and Kent House to the boundary junction with public road called Highway R. Then it moves westerly along Highway R to its junction at Wildey with the Airport to West Coast Highway. Then it goes southerly along the Highway to merge at Clapham with the public road called Highway 6, then go north-westerly along Highway 6 to its junction with the public Observatory Road, then moves southerly along Observatory Road to its junction with the public Fordes Road. Then moving south-westerly, north-westerly and northerly along Fordes Road, Bonnett’s Road and Brittons New Road to its junction with Dalkeith Hill, then westerly along Dalkeith Hill to its junction with Deighton Road; then in a generally northern direction along Deighton Road to its junction with Dayrells Road. Along Dayrells Road in a south-westerly, north-westerly and westerly direction to its junction with Dalkeith Road at the Garrison, then continuing along Dalkeith Road generally south-westerly to its junction with the public road Highway 7; then directly across Highway 7 and continuing in a south-westerly direction along the road leading to Gravesend Beach and directly to the sea.
- With St. George: – Starting from the meeting point of the parishes of St. George, St. Michael, and Christ Church and proceeding in a westerly and northerly direction along the plantation track to its junction at Lower Burney with the public road Highway 5; then westerly along Highway 5 to its junction at Mapp Hill and the public road Haynes Hill.

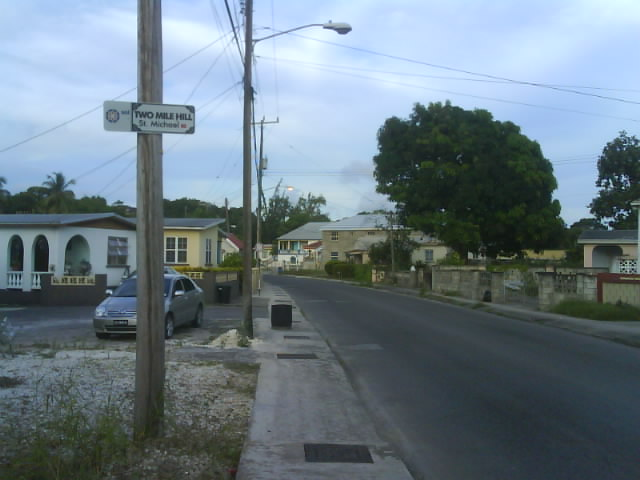
Highway 5, Two Mile Hill

Then northerly along Haynes Hill and Pasture Road to its junction with Monroe Road; then in a westerly direction along Monroe Road to its junction with Salters Tenantry Road, moving along it in a northerly, then westerly then northerly direction to its junction at Salters with the public road Highway 4; then south-westerly along Highway 4 to its junction with a public road called Highway X; moving north-easterlyalong Highway X to its junction with an unclassified road; then in a generally north-westerly then northerly direction along to its junction with the public road leading from the Belle Road to Charles Rowe Bridge; then in a westerly direction to its junction with the unclassified road leading to Lower Estate; then in a generally north-easterly direction along this road (so as to pass to the east of the factory yard) to its junction with a track to the north of the factory yard; then in a north-westerly direction along this track to join an unclassified road and along this road to its junction at Dayrells with the public road called Highway 3; then in a north-easterly direction along Highway 3 to its junction with Cole Road at Bourne; then in a northerly direction along this road to the culvert where it crosses a gully; then along this gully in a south-westerly, north-westerly and north-easterly to a point opposite Applewhaites Tenantry Road; then along the line joining this point to the road junction and north-westerly along Applewhaites Tenantry Road to its junction with a public road called Highway E. This is the meeting point of the parishes of St. George, St. Michael, and St. Thomas.

- With St. James: – Starting from the meeting point of the parishes of St. James, St. Thomas, and St. Michael and proceeding generally westwards along the public road called Clermont Road to its junction with the public road called Husbands Road;
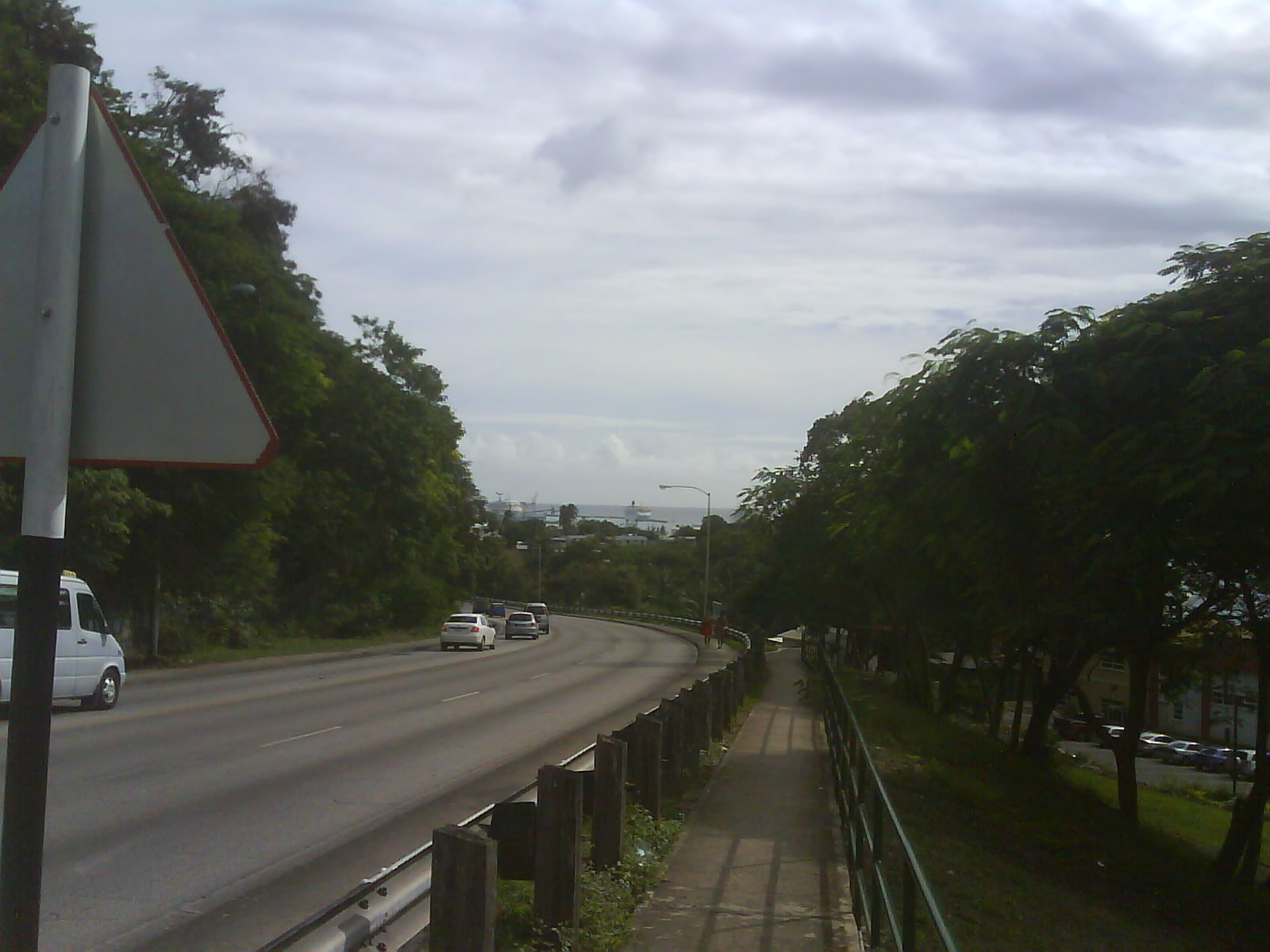
  University Drive
  then in a southerly direction along this road to its junction with University Drive; then in a westerly and southerly direction along University Drive to the center of the roundabout at the intersection of this road and Highway 1; then in a north-westerly direction along Highway 1 to a point just south of its junction with an unclassified road called Batt's Rock Road; then from this point in a straight line (bearing 263°07'21") through a monument (B. 18) to the sea.
- With St. Thomas: – Starting from the meeting point of the parishes of St. Thomas, St. George, and St. Michael and proceeding along Highway E in a south-westerly direction to the junction with the public road running from Canewood to Jackson; then in a westerly, northerly and north-westerly direction to the junction at Jackson with the public road called Highway 2; then in a south-westerly direction along this road to the center of the roundabout at its junction at Warrens with the Airport to West Coast Highway; then in a north-westerly direction along this Highway to the center of the roundabout which is its junction with the public road called Highway 2A; then in a northerly direction along this road to the meeting point of the parishes of St. Thomas, St. James, and St. Michael.

== Politics ==
Saint Michael covers eleven geographical constituencies for the House of Assembly:

- City of Bridgetown
- St. Michael Central
- St. Michael East
- St. Michael South
- St. Michael South Central
- St. Michael South East
- St. Michael North
- St. Michael North East
- St. Michael North West
- St. Michael West
- St. Michael West Central

== Places ==
Found in St. Michael are:

- Caribbean Broadcasting Corporation, Pine
- Caribbean Development Bank, Wildey
- The Sir Gary Sobers Sports complex
- The Kensington Oval
- The National stadium, Waterford
- The Lloyd Erskine Sandiford Centre, Two Mile Hill
- The Black Rock Psychiatric Hospital, commonly called 'Jenkins'
- The Queen Elizabeth Hospital, Barbados' primary health care facility
- State House, formerly Government House, the official residence of the President of Barbados
- Various government offices such as the Ministry of Education and the Ministry of Industry and International Business

== Economy ==
Kayla Foods Int'l (Barbados) Inc., an international division of Yogen Früz, is located in Saint Michael.

== Education ==
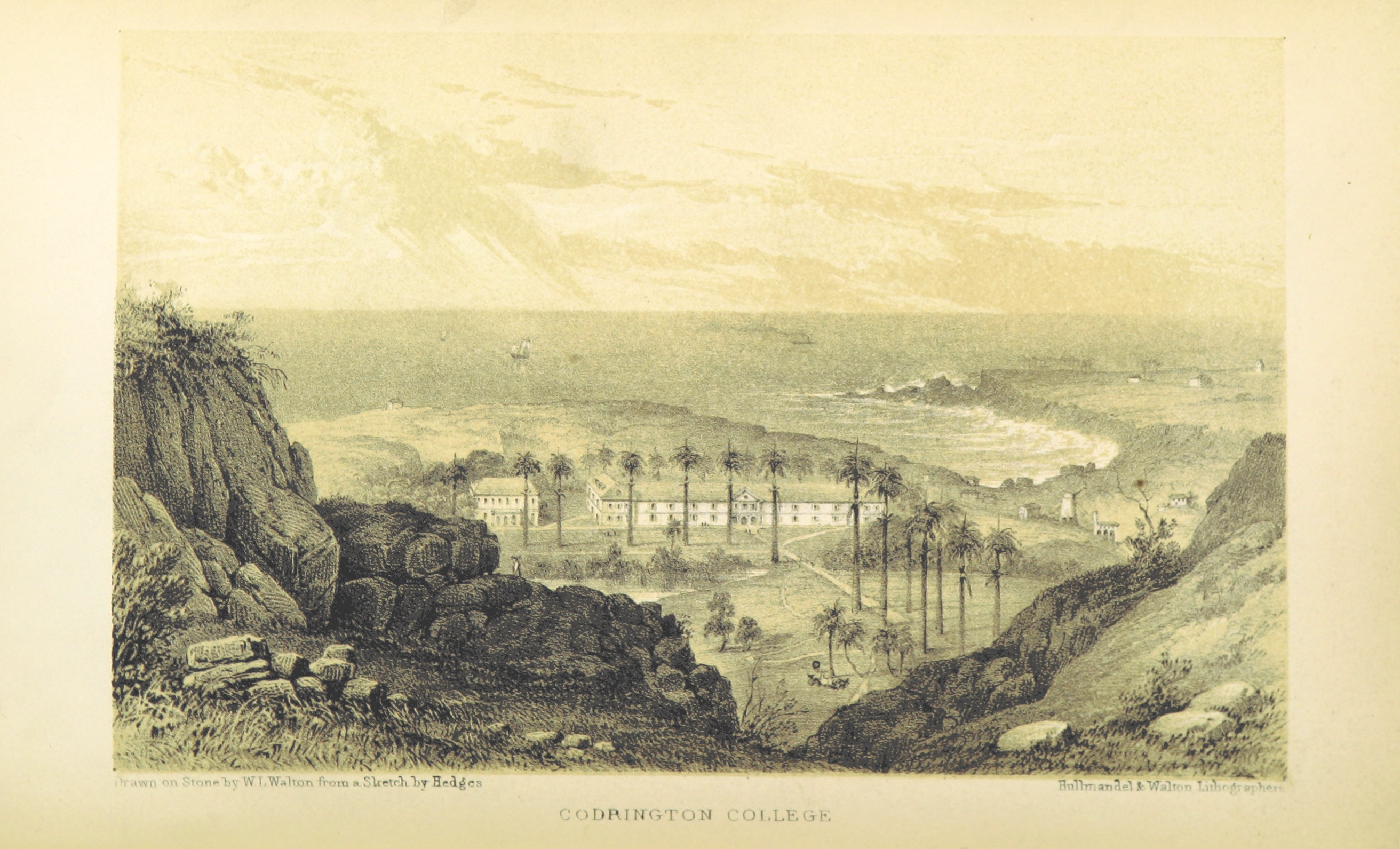
Codrington College, Barbados, 1848

Schools located in St. Michael include:

- American University of Barbados
- American University of Integrative Sciences
- Ann Hill School
- Barbados Community College
- Cave Hill Campus of the University of the West Indies
- Cave Hill School of Business
- Charles F. Broome Memorial Primary School
- Combermere School
- Erdiston Primary School and Special Unit
- Erdiston Teachers' Training College
- Graydon Sealy Secondary School
- Harrison College
- Irving Wilson School
- Parkinson Memorial Secondary School
- Ross University School of Medicine
- Samuel Jackman Prescod Polytechnic
- Springer Girls' Memorial Secondary School
- St. Leonard's Boys' Secondary School
- The St. Michael School

== Notable people ==
- Rihanna (Robyn Rihanna Fenty), singer, businesswoman, and actress
- Tino Best, cricketer
- Stede Bonnet, land owner turned pirate, known as “The Gentleman Pirate”
- Marsha K. Caddle, politician, economist and Minister of Finance, Economic Affairs and Investment
- London Bourne, former slave who became a wealthy merchant and landowner
- Annalee Davis, Barbadian-born visual artist
- Sir Wes Hall, cricketer and former Minister for Sport & Tourism
- Shai Hope, cricketer
- Elvis Joseph, former National Football League running back, first professional American Football player from Barbados
- John Goddard, cricketer and businessmen
- Anthony Kellman, poet, novelist and musician
- Frank Marshall, Anglican Dean of Barbados, based at the Cathedral Church of Saint Michael and All Angels in Saint Michael
- Velma Scantlebury, first woman African American transplant surgeon in the United States, born in Goodland, St Michael
- Sir Garfield Sobers, cricketer
- Nellie Weekes (1896–1990) – campaigner for women's rights, who ran for office in 1942, before women were allowed to vote in the country.
- Neville Goddard, writer, lecturer, and mystic
