= 2025 St. James North by-election =

Parliamentary by-election in Barbados in 2025

2025 St James North constituency by-election
- 21 May 2025
- Turnout: 37.85% (▼2.95pp)
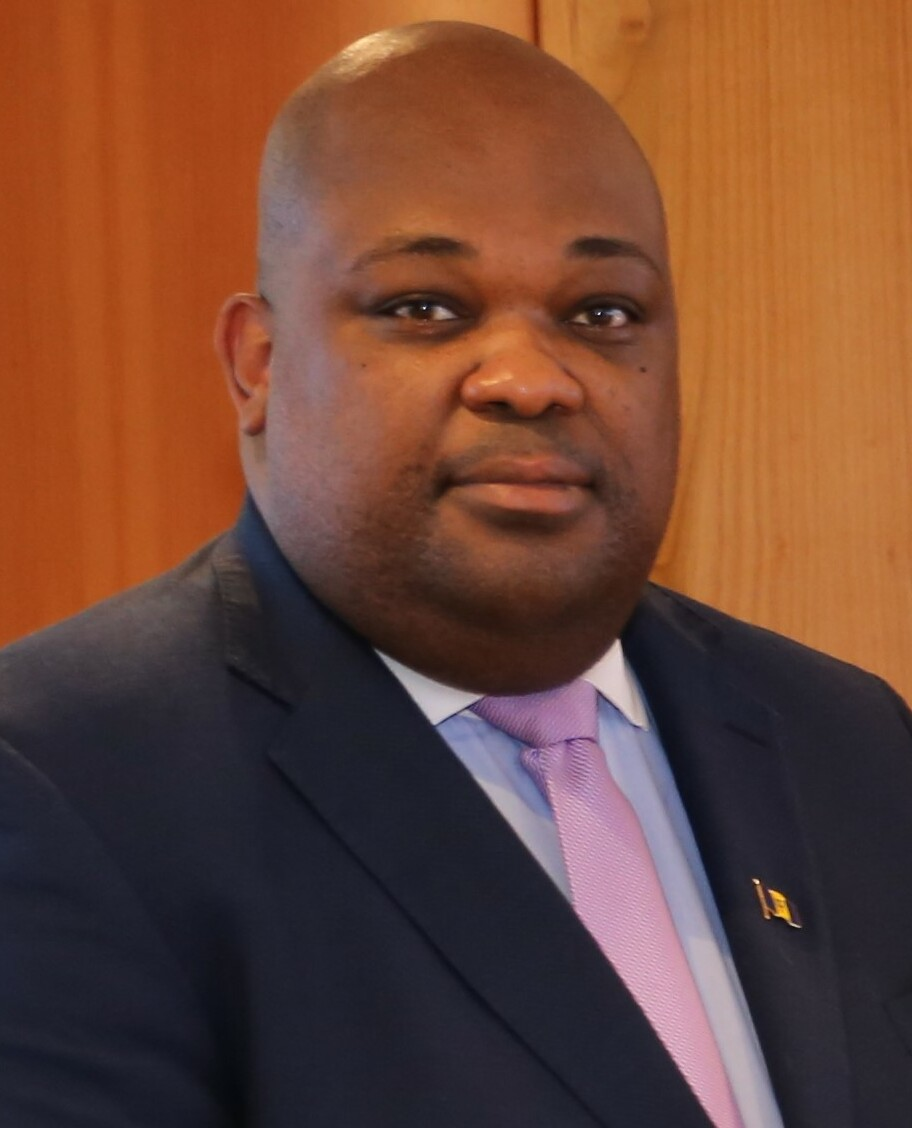

	First party	Second party
Candidate	Chad Blackman	Felicia Dujon
Party	BLP	DLP
Popular vote	2,723	468
Percentage	84.27%	14.48%
Swing	▲3.57pp	▼4.82pp
- Boundary of St. James in Barbados
MP before election
Edmund Hinkson
BLP
Elected MP
Chad Blackman
BLP

A by-election was held in the Barbadian constituency of Saint James North on 21 May 2025, following the resignation of incumbent Barbados Labour Party (BLP) Member of Parliament Edmund Hinkson, who had represented the constituency since the 2013 Barbadian general election. It was the first by-election held after Barbados became a republic.

== Background ==
Member of Parliament Edmund Hinkson, who was the representative for constituency of St. James North in the House of Assembly of Barbados, resigned from the elected position on 25 April 2025 triggering a by-election. That same day Prime Minister Mia Mottley announced the date of the by-election and 26 April 2025 and President Sandra Mason issued a Writ for the election to take place. In accordance to section 47, subsection two of Constitution of Barbados, vacant seats in the lower house must have a by-election within 90 days. Nomination day was announced to be 6 May 2025 and election day 21 May 2025.

== Previous election ==
=== St. James North ===
St. James North
Party	Candidate	Votes	%	±%
BLP	Edmund Hinkson	2,536	80.7	−3.0
DLP	Charles Worrell	608	19.3	+6.0
Majority		1,928	61.3	−9.1
Turnout		3,159	40.80	
Registered electors		7,726		
BLP hold		Swing	-4.5	

== Campaign ==
=== Contesting parties ===
Party	Position	Ideology	Leader (since)
Barbados Labour Party	Centre-left	Social democracy Republicanism	Mia Mottley (February 2013)
Democratic Labour Party	Centre-left	Social democracy Republicanism	Ralph Thorne (February 2024)
Bajan Free Party		Government transparency Anti-corruption	Alex Mitchell (October 2012)
Community Empowerment Party			Steffanie Williams (May 2025)

== Conduct ==
The Electoral and Boundaries Commission reported all seven polling stations opened on time and voting process had no major glitches during the voting period. A few electoral infractions were investigated after reports of DLP election posters being within 100 yards of polling stations which is prohibited by law. The commission, after investigations, ordered party officials to remove them which was completed. The election was also praised by the National Organisation of the Disabled (BARNOD) and disabled voters for the improvements to the voting process for disabled people citing an easier and smoother procedure than previous elections.

== Results ==
Chad Blackman won the election, keeping the seat in BLP hands. Turnout was 37.85%.

St. James North
Party	Candidate	Votes	%	±%
BLP	Chad Blackman	3,154	84.27	+3.57
DLP	Felicia Dujon	468	14.48	−4.82
Community Empowerment Party	Steffanie Williams	21	0.64	New
BFP	Alex Mitchell	7	0.21	New
Majority		2,686	57.93	
Total valid votes		3,219	99.62	
Turnout		3231	37.85	
Registered electors		8,538		
BLP hold		Swing	+3.57	

== Aftermath ==
The winner of the election, Chad Blackman, was sworn in by the President of Barbados Sandra Mason as a Member of Parliament the next day on 22 May 2025. He resumed his duties as Minister of Educational Transformation.

== See also ==
- 2022 Barbadian general election
- List of parliamentary constituencies of Barbados
