= Kirk Matthew Humphrey =

Barbadian politician

Kirk Duncan Matthew Humphrey (born St. Michael South, Barbados) is a Barbadian politician and government minister of Barbados. He is the Minister of People Empowerment and Elder Affairs as appointed by President Dame Sandra Mason.

== Early life and career ==
Humphrey was born in Saint Michael, Barbados. Kirk Humphrey has two master's degrees from London School of Economics in Social Policy and Planning for Developing Countries. He obtained his second degree from Harvard Kennedy School with a focus on "Public Policy and Leadership" and "Leadership and Human Rights".

In the 2018 Barbadian general election he was elected member of parliament representing Saint Michael South under the Barbados Labour Party defeating Prime Minister Freundel Stuart. He was subsequently appointed Minister of Maritime Affairs and the Blue Economy, in the Mia Mottley Administration.

On February 3, 2022, he was appointed Minister of People Empowerment and Elder Affairs by President Dame Sandra Mason.
