= Lisa Cummins =

Barbadian politician

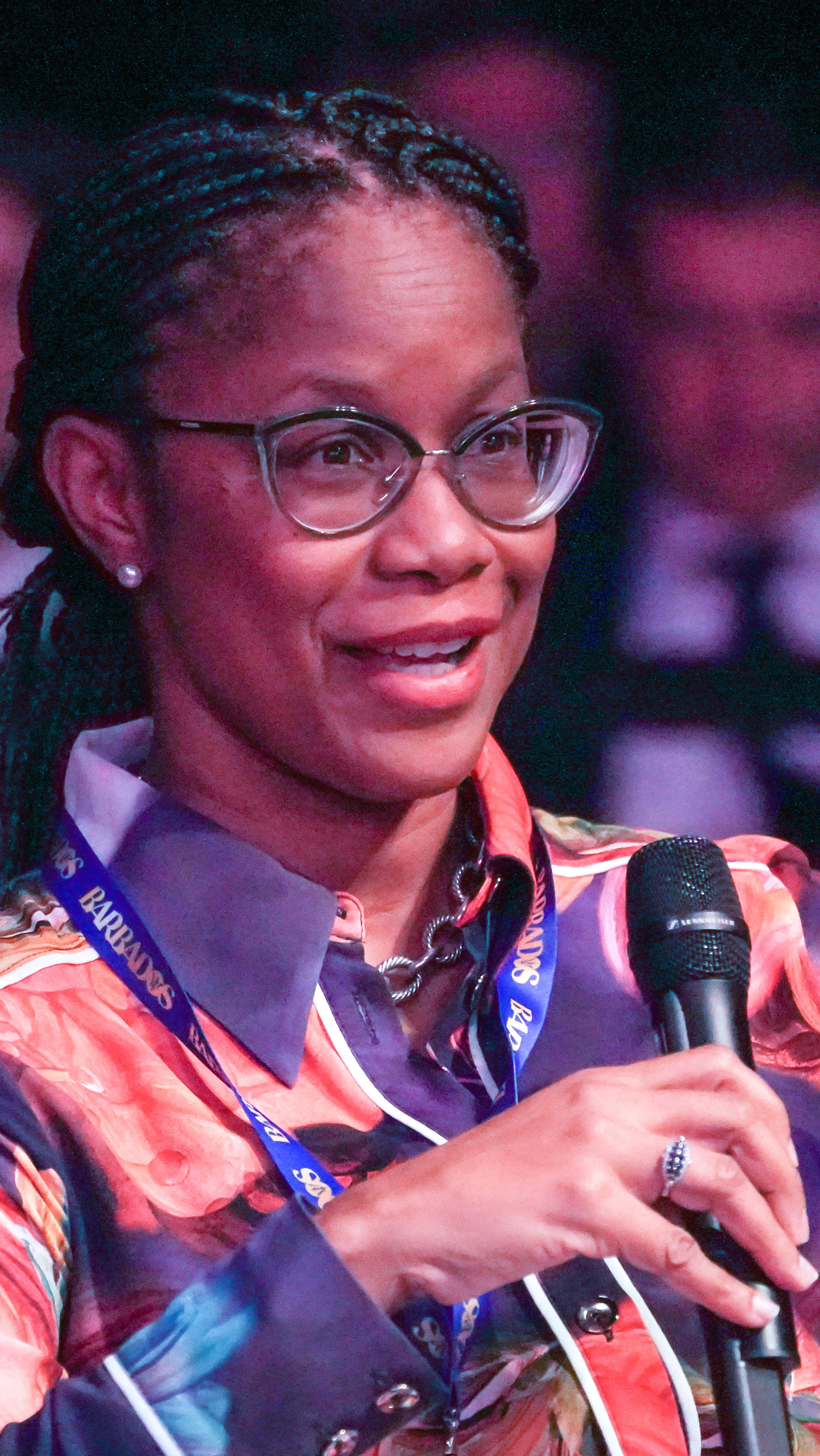
- Lisa Cummins in London in November 2021
- Occupation: Politician
- Position held: Minister of Tourism and International Transport (2020–2022), Leader of Government Business in The Senate of Barbados (2022–), Minister of Energy of Barbados (2022–)

Lisa Rene Cummins is a Barbadian politician. She is a senator in the Senate of Barbados. She currently serves as the Minister of Energy and Business including International Business in the Mia Mottley administration.
