= Charles McDonald Griffith =

Barbados politician

Member of Barbados Parliament
- Incumbent
- Assumed office May 24, 2018

Minister of Youth, Sports and Community Empowerment
- Incumbent
- Assumed office January 24, 2022

Minister in the Ministry of Transport, Works and Water Resources with responsibility for Water
- In office July 23, 2020 – January 19, 2022

Minister in the Ministry of Housing, Lands and Rural Development
- In office May 26, 2018 – July 23, 2020

Personal details
- Born: Barbados
- Party: Barbados Labour Party

Charles McDonald Griffith is a Barbadian politician. He is a member of Parliament in the Barbados Parliament and former Minister in the Ministry of Water Resources of Barbados in the government of Mia Mottley. He was reassigned to the portfolio of Minister of Youth, Sports and Community Empowerment in January 2022. He is representing the Saint John constituency, Barbados.
