= Ian Gooding-Edghill =

Barbadian politician

Ian Gooding-Edghill is a Barbadian politician and businessman. He has served as a member of parliament in the Parliament of Barbados for the Saint Michael West Central constituency.
