= Kay McConney =

Barbadian politician

Kay Sharon McConney is a Barbadian politician in the Barbados Labour Party (BLP). She was a senator in the Senate of Barbados. In the 2022 Barbadian general election, she was elected in Saint Philip West constituency. She currently serves as the Minister of Education, Technological and Vocational Training in the Mia Mottley administration.
