= Ryan Straughn =

Barbadian politician

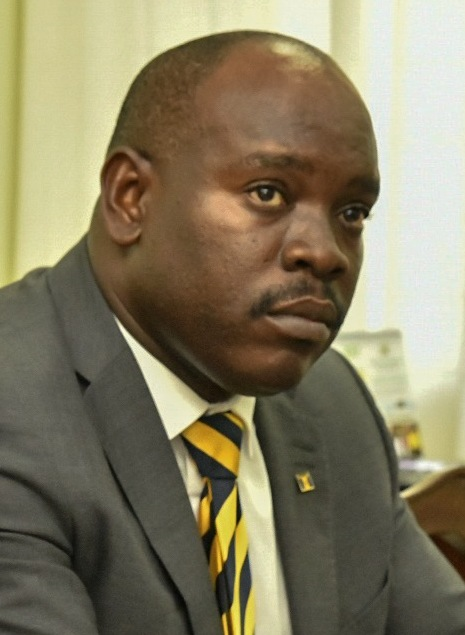
Ryan Straughn, MP

Ryan Ricardo Straughn is a Barbadian politician and economist. He is a member of parliament in the House of Assembly of Barbados. He was first elected member of parliament in January 2018. He holds the position of Minister in the Ministry of Finance and Economic Affairs.
