= Gline Clarke =

Barbadian politician (born 1951)

Gline Arley Clarke

High Commissioner of Barbados to Canada
- Incumbent
- Assumed office September 2020

Deputy Speaker, House of Assembly of Barbados
- In office 2018–2020

Personal details
- Born: 9 February 1950 (age 76) Newbury, Barbados
- Occupation: Politician

Gline Arley Clarke (born 9 February 1951) is a Barbadian politician and teacher. He was a member of parliament in the House of Assembly of Barbados. Clarke is the Barbados Ambassador to Canada since September 2020.

== Early life ==
Clarke was born on 9 February 1950, in Newbury, St. George, Barbados. He attended University of the West Indies where he studied and graduated. In 1974, he secured his degree in Social Science and Political Science.

== Career ==
Clarke began his career as a teacher, teaching in 1970 at the St. Jude's Primary in Barbados. After teaching for ten years, in 1983, he was appointed vice counsel and liaison officer at the Barbados High Commission in Canada, where he served until 1987. On his return to Barbados in 1991, he briefly worked with former Prime Minister Owen Arthur until 1994. In 1994, he was elected to the Barbados Parliament, where he worked as Parliamentary Secretary in the Ministry of Housing and Public Works. In 1999, he was re-elected Minister of Housing and Lands until 2003, and subsequently re-elected as Minister of Public Works and Transport from 2003 to 2008.

In 2013, Clarke was re-elected to the Barbados House of Assembly in the 2013 general election. He held his seat in the 2018 general election, and was appointed as the Deputy Speaker in the 2018. On 21 September 2020, Clarke resigned as member of Parliament after he was appointed Barbados Ambassador to Canada. He resumed his position in Ottawa in July 2021, several months after his appointment.
