= Colin Everett Jordan =

Barbadian politician and hotelier

Colin Jordan

Member of the House of Assembly of Barbados for Saint Peter
- Incumbent
- Assumed office 24 May 2018
- Preceded by: Owen Arthur

Personal details
- Party: Barbados Labour Party

Colin Everett Jordan is a Barbadian politician and hotelier. He is a member of parliament in the House of Assembly of Barbados. He was first elected member of parliament in January 2018. He also serves as the Minister of Labor, Social Security and Third Sector in the cabinet of Mia Mottley.
