= 2018 Barbadian general election =

- 24 May 2018

All 30 seats in the House of Assembly 16 seats needed for a majority
- Turnout: 59.56% (▼2.46pp)
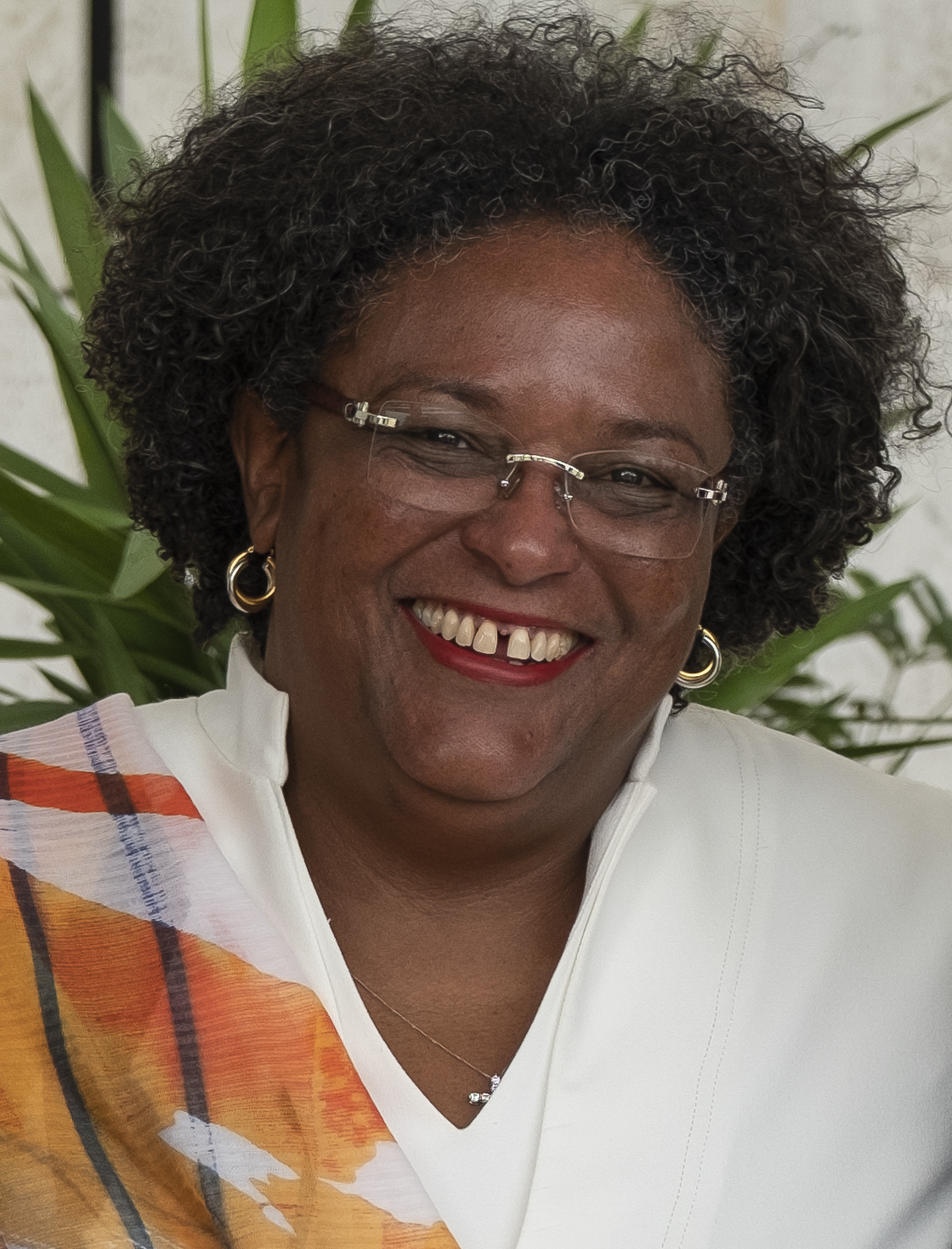

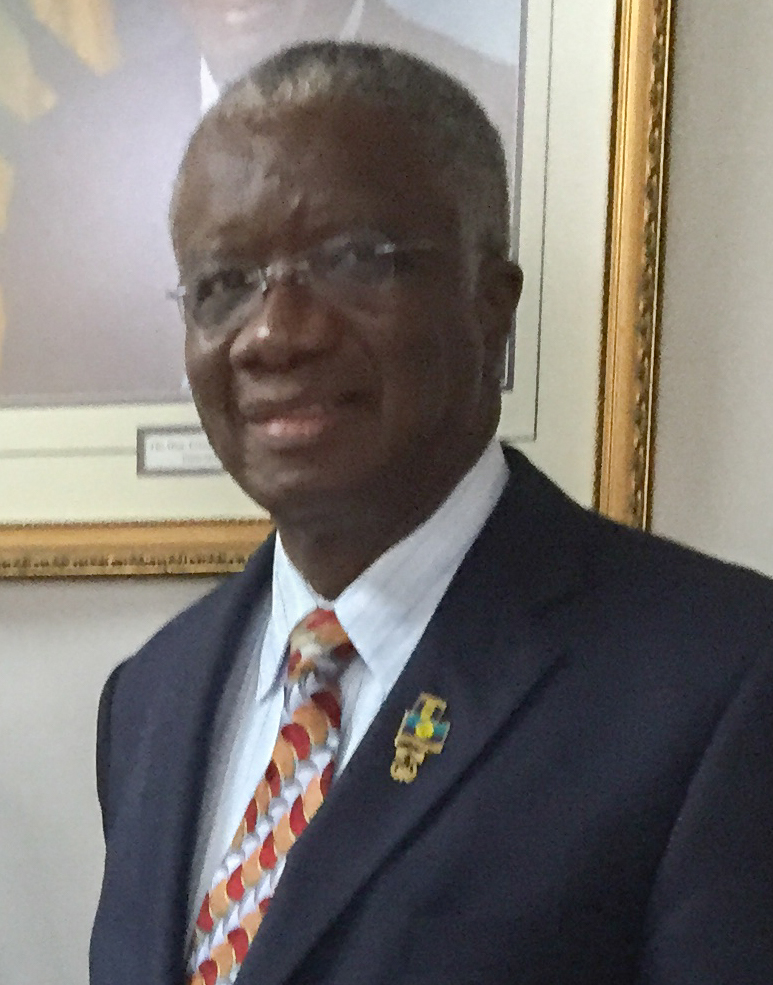
	First party	Second party
Leader	Mia Mottley	Freundel Stuart
Party	BLP	DLP
Leader's seat	St. Michael North East	St. Michael South (lost re-election)
Last election	48.22%, 14 seats	51.30%, 16 seats
Seats won	30	0
Seat change	▲16	▼16
Popular vote	112,955	33,551
Percentage	73.47%	21.8%
Swing	▲25.25pp	▼29.4pp
- Results by constituency
Prime Minister before election
Freundel Stuart
DLP
Elected Prime Minister
Mia Mottley
BLP

General elections were held in Barbados on 24 May 2018. The result was a landslide victory for the opposition Barbados Labour Party (BLP), which won all 30 seats in the House of Assembly, resulting in BLP leader Mia Mottley becoming the country's first female prime minister. The BLP's victory was the first time a party in Barbados had won every seat in the House of Assembly. Previously, the most one-sided result for a Barbadian election had been in 1999, when the BLP won 26 of the 28 seats. The BLP's 73.5 percent vote share was also the highest on record.

The ruling Democratic Labour Party (DLP) led by Freundel Stuart lost all 16 seats, the worst defeat of a sitting government in Barbadian history. The DLP saw its vote share more than halve compared to the previous elections in 2013, with only one of its candidates receiving more than 40 percent of the vote. Stuart was defeated in his own constituency, receiving only 26.7 percent of the vote, the second time a Barbadian sitting prime minister had lost their own seat. It was also the first time since independence that the constituency of St John, a traditionally DLP stronghold, was won by the BLP.

The election was fought primarily on the DLP's stewardship of the economy during its decade in power. The government had had to contend with numerous downgrades of its credit rating due to fallout from the 2008 financial crisis. The BLP criticised the DLP over rising taxes and a declining standard of living, and promised numerous infrastructure upgrades if elected.

== Electoral system ==
The 30 members of the House of Assembly were elected by first-past-the-post voting in single-member constituencies.

== Candidates ==
A record 134 candidates from nine political parties contested the elections. Four of the smaller parties chose to fight together under the 'Coalition of United Parties' banner.

== Results ==
Party	Votes	%	Seats	+/–
Barbados Labour Party	112,955	73.47	30	+16
Democratic Labour Party	33,551	21.82	0	–16
Solutions Barbados	3,772	2.45	0	New
United Progressive Party	1,913	1.24	0	New
Barbados Integrity Movement	340	0.22	0	New
Bajan Free Party	107	0.07	0	0
People's Democratic Congress	55	0.04	0	0
Kingdom Government of Barbados	26	0.02	0	0
Progressive Conservative Party	10	0.01	0	New
Independents	1,009	0.66	0	0
Total	153,738	100.00	30	0
Valid votes	153,738	99.70		
Invalid/blank votes	455	0.30		
Total votes	154,193	100.00		
Registered voters/turnout	258,901	59.56		
Source: Parliament of Barbados

=== By constituency ===
==== Christ Church East ====
Christ Church East
Party	Candidate	Votes	%	±%
BLP	Wilfred Abrahams	4,432	73.9	+30.6
DLP	Denis Lowe	1,350	22.5	−34.2
SB	Ann Weatherhead	161	2.7	new
UPP	Victor Knight	53	0.9	new
Majority		3,082	51.4	+38.0
Turnout		5,996		
BLP gain from DLP		Swing	+32.4	

==== Christ Church East Central ====
Christ Church East Central
Party	Candidate	Votes	%	±%
BLP	Ryan Straughn	4,062	71.2	+30.2
DLP	Ronald Jones	1,334	23.4	−35.6
SB	Scott Weatherhead	217	3.8	new
UPP	Ogeji Dottin	93	1.6	new
Majority		2,728	47.8	+29.8
Turnout		5,706		
BLP gain from DLP		Swing	+32.9	

==== Christ Church South ====
Christ Church South
Party	Candidate	Votes	%	±%
BLP	Ralph Thorne	3,094	70.4	+27.1
DLP	John Boyce	1,120	25.5	−30.4
SB	Julie Chalbaud	111	2.5	new
UPP	Nadja Willis	28	0.6	new
Kingdom Government of Barbados	Steve Hunte	26	0.6	−0.2
Independent	Buddy Larrier	14	0.3	new
Majority		1,974	44.9	+32.3
Turnout		4,393		
BLP gain from DLP		Swing	+28.8	

==== Christ Church West ====
Christ Church West
Party	Candidate	Votes	%	±%
BLP	William Duguid	3,080	69.6	+17.8
DLP	Verla Depeiza	759	17.1	−22.8
SB	Irvin Belgrave	589	13.3	new
Majority		2,321	52.4	+40.7
Turnout		4,428		
BLP hold		Swing	+20.3	

==== Christ Church West Central ====
Christ Church West Central
Party	Candidate	Votes	%	±%
BLP	Adrian Forde	3,891	74.3	+32.5
DLP	Stephen Lashley	1,131	21.6	−36.6
SB	Kenneth Lewis	170	3.2	new
UPP	Ria Riley	45	0.9	new
Majority		2,760	52.7	+36.3
Turnout		5,237		
BLP gain from DLP		Swing	+34.5	

==== City of Bridgetown ====
City of Bridgetown
Party	Candidate	Votes	%	±%
BLP	Jeffrey Bostic	2,781	73.6	+22.0
DLP	Henderson Williams	793	21.0	−27.4
SB	Fallon Best	76	2.0	new
UPP	Lynette Eastmond	63	1.7	new
Independent	Natalie Harewood	54	1.4	new
Progressive Conservative Party	Rodney Nurse	10	0.3	new
Majority		1,988	52.6	+49.5
Turnout		3,777		
BLP hold		Swing	+24.7	

==== St. Andrew ====
St. Andrew
Party	Candidate	Votes	%	±%
BLP	George Payne	3,512	74.5	+21.9
DLP	V. Irene Sandiford-Garner	1,045	22.2	−25.2
SB	Cherie Pounder	68	1.4	new
UPP	Roli Roachford	53	1.1	new
Independent	Stephen Pollard	35	0.7	new
Majority		2,467	52.3	+47.1
Turnout		4,713		
BLP hold		Swing	+23.5	

==== St. George North ====
St. George North
Party	Candidate	Votes	%	±%
BLP	Gline Clarke	4,779	80.8	+21.4
DLP	Jepter Ince	745	12.6	−27.9
SB	Grenville Phillips	264	4.5	new
UPP	Everton Holligan	124	2.1	new
Majority		4,034	68.2	+49.3
Turnout		5,912		
BLP hold		Swing	+24.6	

==== St. George South ====
St. George South
Party	Candidate	Votes	%	±%
BLP	Dwight Sutherland	5,363	79.3	+24.2
DLP	Esther Byer-Suckoo	1,100	16.3	−28.6
SB	Andrew Banfield	193	2.9	new
UPP	Craig Harewood	69	1.0	new
Barbados Integrity Movement	Doris Ramratty-Barrow	34	0.5	new
Majority		4,263	63.1	+52.8
Turnout		6,759		
BLP hold		Swing	+26.4	

==== St. James Central ====
St. James Central
Party	Candidate	Votes	%	±%
BLP	Kerrie Symmonds	3,577	78.2	+28.0
DLP	George Connolly	733	16.0	−32.7
SB	Daniel Chalbaud	123	2.7	new
UPP	Wendell Callender	64	1.4	new
Independent	Joseph Jordan	49	1.1	new
People's Democratic Congress	Eric Marshall	28	0.6	−0.5
Majority		2,844	62.2	+60.7
Turnout		4,574		
BLP hold		Swing	+30.4	

==== St. James North ====
St. James North
Party	Candidate	Votes	%	±%
BLP	Edmund Hinkson	3,716	83.7	+29.1
DLP	Harcourt Husbands	592	13.3	−32.0
SB	David Waldron	76	1.7	new
UPP	Granville Cobham	54	1.2	new
Majority		3,124	70.4	+61.1
Turnout		4,438		
BLP hold		Swing	+30.6	

==== St. James South ====
St. James South
Party	Candidate	Votes	%	±%
BLP	Sandra Husbands	4,012	68.1	+24.7
DLP	Donville Inniss	1,674	28.4	−28.1
SB	Jacqueline Alleyne-Worrell	103	1.7	new
UPP	Christal Austin	101	1.7	new
Majority		2,338	39.7	+26.6
Turnout		5,890		
BLP gain from DLP		Swing	+26.4	

==== St. John ====
St. John
Party	Candidate	Votes	%	±%
BLP	Charles Griffith	2,983	57.9	+36.6
DLP	George Pilgrim	1,598	31.0	−47.7
UPP	Hudson Griffith	308	6.0	new
Independent	Leroy McClean	155	3.0	new
SB	Cherone Martindale	86	1.7	new
Barbados Integrity Movement	Derek Went	22	0.4	new
Majority		1,385	26.9	−30.5
Turnout		5,152		
BLP gain from DLP		Swing	+42.1	

==== St. Joseph ====
St. Joseph
Party	Candidate	Votes	%	±%
BLP	Dale Marshall	3,391	70.6	+17.1
Independent	Randall Rouse	700	14.6	new
DLP	Dennis Holder	588	12.2	−34.3
SB	Jennifer Highland	125	2.6	new
Majority		2,691	56.0	+49.1
Turnout		4,804		
BLP hold		Swing	n/a	

==== St. Lucy ====
St. Lucy
Party	Candidate	Votes	%	±%
BLP	Peter Phillips	3,959	66.4	+20.0
DLP	Denis St. Kellman	1,789	30.0	−23.6
SB	John Carter	121	2.0	new
UPP	Wayne Griffith	69	1.2	new
Barbados Integrity Movement	Richard Roach	27	0.5	new
Majority		2,170	36.4	+29.2
Turnout		5,965		
BLP gain from DLP		Swing	+21.8	

==== St. Michael Central ====
St. Michael Central
Party	Candidate	Votes	%	±%
BLP	Arthur Holder	2,948	73.6	+24.1
DLP	Steven Blackett	905	22.6	−27.9
UPP	Richard Barrow	69	1.7	new
SB	Robert Toussaint	62	1.5	new
Barbados Integrity Movement	Glenville Evelyn	20	0.5	new
Majority		2,043	51.0	+50.1
Turnout		4,004		
BLP gain from DLP		Swing	+26.0	

==== St. Michael East ====
St. Michael East
Party	Candidate	Votes	%	±%
BLP	Trevor Prescod	3,408	71.5	+20.2
DLP	Nicholas Alleyne	1,147	24.1	−24.7
SB	Betty Howell	108	2.3	new
UPP	Paul Forte	47	1.0	new
Independent	Iramar Daisley	37	0.8	new
Barbados Integrity Movement	Catherine Yarde	20	0.4	new
Majority		2,261	47.4	+44.9
Turnout		4,767		
BLP hold		Swing	+22.5	

==== St. Michael North ====
St. Michael North
Party	Candidate	Votes	%	±%
BLP	Ronald Toppin	3,518	72.3	+20.8
DLP	Kim Tudor	1,132	23.3	−24.4
UPP	Maria Phillips	99	2.0	new
SB	Angela Gibbs	72	1.5	new
People's Democratic Congress	Mark Adamson	27	0.6	−0.2
Independent	Lesloyed Bishop	15	0.3	new
Majority		2,386	49.1	+45.3
Turnout		4,863		
BLP hold		Swing	+22.6	

==== St. Michael North East ====
St. Michael North East
Party	Candidate	Votes	%	±%
BLP	Mia Mottley	4,553	87.2	+18.3
DLP	Patrick Todd	500	9.6	−21.5
SB	Kemar Stuart	133	2.5	new
Bajan Free Party	Enlou Frere	37	0.7	new
Majority		4,053	77.6	+39.8
Turnout		5,223		
BLP hold		Swing	+19.9	

==== St. Michael North West ====
St. Michael North West
Party	Candidate	Votes	%	±%
BLP	Neil Rowe	2,489	55.6	+18.9
DLP	Christopher Sinckler	1,991	44.4	−18.9
Majority		498	11.1	−15.6
Turnout		4,480		
BLP gain from DLP		Swing	+18.9	

==== St. Michael South ====
St. Michael South
Party	Candidate	Votes	%	±%
BLP	Kirk Humphery	2,969	70.0	+35.3
DLP	Freundel Stuart	1,083	25.5	−38.7
SB	Paul Gibson	104	2.5	new
UPP	Sandra Corbin	57	1.3	new
Bajan Free Party	Alex Mitchell	31	0.7	−0.5
Majority		1,886	44.4	+14.9
Turnout		4,244		
BLP gain from DLP		Swing	+37.0	

==== St. Michael South Central ====
St. Michael South Central
Party	Candidate	Votes	%	±%
BLP	Marsha Caddle	2,881	67.6	+20.8
DLP	Richard Sealy	1,101	25.8	−27.3
UPP	David Gill	198	4.6	new
SB	Alan Springer	81	1.9	new
Majority		1,780	41.8	+35.5
Turnout		4,261		
BLP gain from DLP		Swing	+24.0	

==== St. Michael South East ====
St. Michael South East
Party	Candidate	Votes	%	±%
BLP	Santia Bradshaw	3,803	75.6	+25.5
DLP	Rodney Grant	1,099	21.8	−28.1
SB	Arlene Bourne	105	2.1	new
UPP	Veronica Price	26	0.5	new
Majority		2,704	53.7	+53.5
Turnout		5,033		
BLP hold		Swing	+26.8	

==== St. Michael West ====
St. Michael West
Party	Candidate	Votes	%	±%
BLP	Joseph Atherley	3,214	76.8	+28.3
DLP	Michael Carrington	838	20.0	−31.4
SB	Lana Toussaint	55	1.3	new
UPP	Patsie Nurse	45	1.1	new
Barbados Integrity Movement	Neil Holder	32	0.8	new
Majority		2,376	56.8	+53.9
Turnout		4,184		
BLP gain from DLP		Swing	+29.8	

==== St. Michael West Central ====
St. Michael West Central
Party	Candidate	Votes	%	±%
BLP	George Gooding-Edghill	3,291	75.6	+29.0
DLP	James Paul	865	19.9	−31.1
SB	Angela Edey	125	2.9	new
Barbados Integrity Movement	Steven Belgrave	46	1.1	new
UPP	Herman Lowe	29	0.7	new
Majority		2,426	55.7	+51.3
Turnout		4,356		
BLP gain from DLP		Swing	+30.0	

==== St. Peter ====
St. Peter
Party	Candidate	Votes	%	±%
BLP	Colin Jordan	4,632	81.5	+17.4
DLP	Dave Cumberbatch	911	16.0	−18.6
Barbados Integrity Movement	Lynroy Scantlebury	139	2.4	new
Majority		3,721	65.5	+36.1
Turnout		5,682		
BLP hold		Swing	+18.0	

==== St. Philip North ====
St. Philip North
Party	Candidate	Votes	%	±%
BLP	Sonia Browne	3,613	61.0	+28.2
DLP	Michael Lashley	2,015	34.0	−33.2
SB	Rosaline Corbin	203	3.4	new
UPP	Nigel Newton	92	1.6	new
Majority		1,598	27.0	−7.5
Turnout		5,923		
BLP gain from DLP		Swing	+30.7	

==== St. Philip South ====
St. Philip South
Party	Candidate	Votes	%	±%
BLP	Indar Weir	4,656	71.1	+24.1
DLP	Adriel Brathwaite	1,488	22.7	−30.3
SB	Ronald Lorde	239	3.6	new
UPP	Bruce Hennis	127	1.9	new
Bajan Free Party	John Scantlebury	39	0.6	new
Majority		3,168	48.4	+42.3
Turnout		6,549		
BLP gain from DLP		Swing	+27.2	

==== St. Philip West ====
St. Philip West
Party	Candidate	Votes	%	±%
BLP	John King	4,323	66.9	+28.6
DLP	David Estwick	1,924	29.8	−31.9
SB	Leighton Greenidge	212	3.3	new
Majority		2,399	37.1	+13.9
Turnout		6,459		
BLP gain from DLP		Swing	+30.2	

==== St. Thomas ====
St. Thomas
Party	Candidate	Votes	%	±%
BLP	Cynthia Forde	5,038	85.7	+20.1
DLP	Rolerick Hinds	635	10.8	−23.6
SB	Pauline Corbin	206	3.5	new
Majority		4,403	74.9	+43.7
Turnout		5,879		
BLP hold		Swing	+21.8	

== Aftermath ==
One week after the elections, Joseph Atherley, MP for St. Michael West, crossed the floor to become the House of Assembly's sole opposition member, citing concerns about democracy. He was subsequently appointed Leader of the Opposition. Originally sitting as an independent, he set up his own party, the People's Party for Democracy and Development.

=== 2020 St George North by-election ===
A by-election was held in the constituency of St George North on 11 November 2020 following the resignation of Gline Clarke, who had represented the constituency for 26 years, to accept the post of Barbadian High Commissioner to Canada. It was the first by-election to take place since the 2018 general election. Toni Moore retained the seat for the BLP.

== See also ==
- 2020 St George North by-election
- 2022 Barbadian general election
- List of parliamentary constituencies of Barbados
