= Jerome Walcott =

Barbadian diplomat and politician (born 1957)

Jerome Xavier Walcott
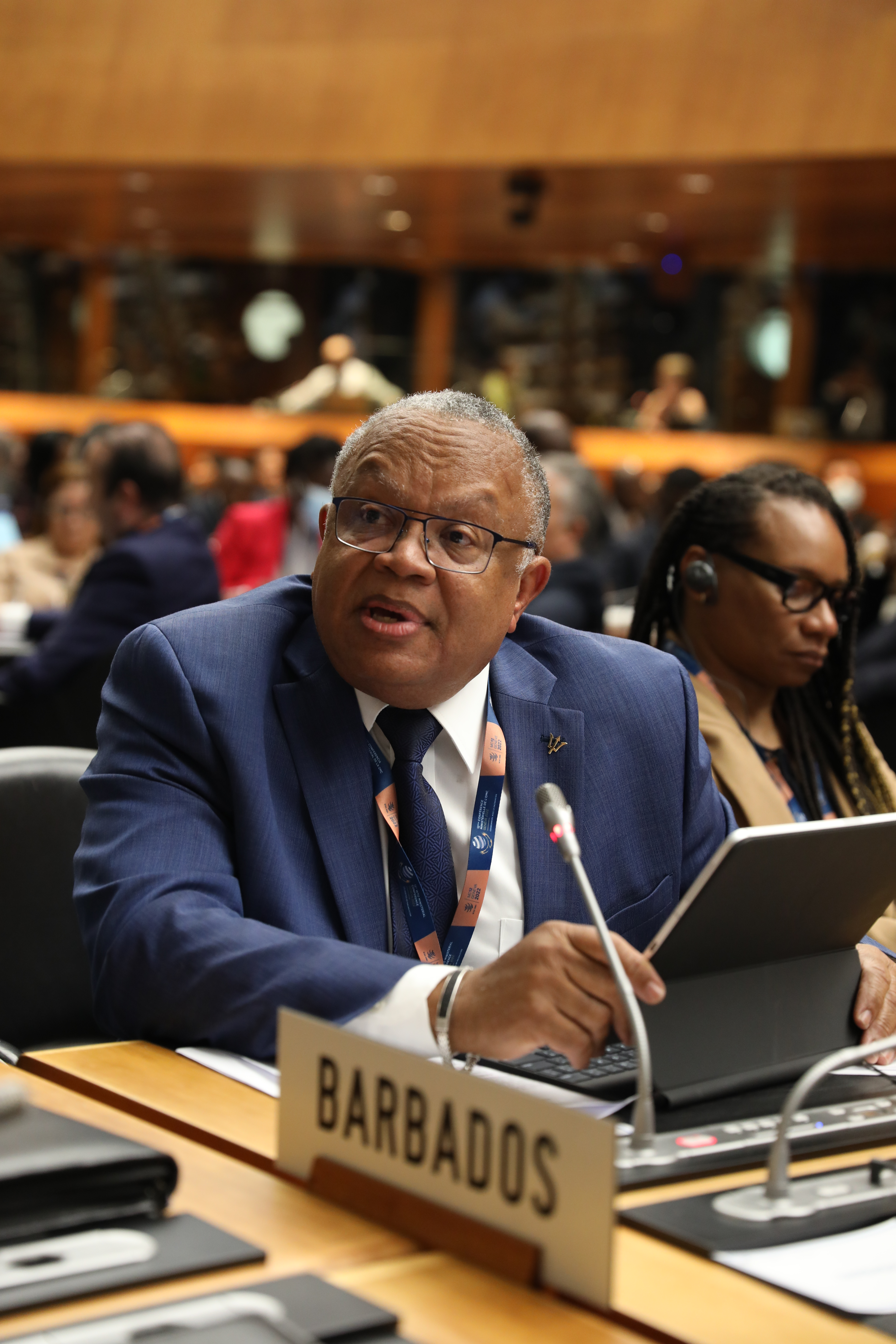
- Walcott in 2022

Minister of Health and Wellness
- Incumbent
- Assumed office 26 October 2022
- Prime Minister: Mia Mottley
- Preceded by: Ian Gooding-Edghill

Minister of Foreign Affairs and Foreign Trade
- In office 26 May 2018 – 26 October 2022
- Prime Minister: Mia Mottley
- Preceded by: Maxine McClean
- Succeeded by: Kerrie Symmonds

Leader of the Senate
- In office 27 May 2018 – 26 January 2022
- Prime Minister: Mia Mottley
- Preceded by: Maxine McClean
- Succeeded by: Lisa Cummins

Personal details
- Born: April 2, 1957 (age 69) Barbados
- Party: Labour Party
- Education: London Business School; University of the West Indies

Jerome Xavier Walcott FRCS (born April 2, 1957) is a Barbadian diplomat and politician who served as foreign minister of Barbados.

== Biography ==
Walcott was raised in Bridgetown and was educated at St. Angela's Primary and also studied at London Business School. He graduated from University of the West Indies in 1982 and is a fellow of the Royal College of Surgeons.

Walcott was MP between 2003 and 2008, and since 2001 was Leader of Government Business in the Senate and later served as minister of health under the tenure of Owen Arthur. Between 1995 and 1997, he served as Assistant Secretary of the Labour Party and has been its chairman as of 2021. He was also appointed a senator in 2013.

Since May 27, 2018, he has been the minister of foreign affairs of Barbados under prime minister Mia Mottley.
