= Chad Blackman =

Barbadian diplomat

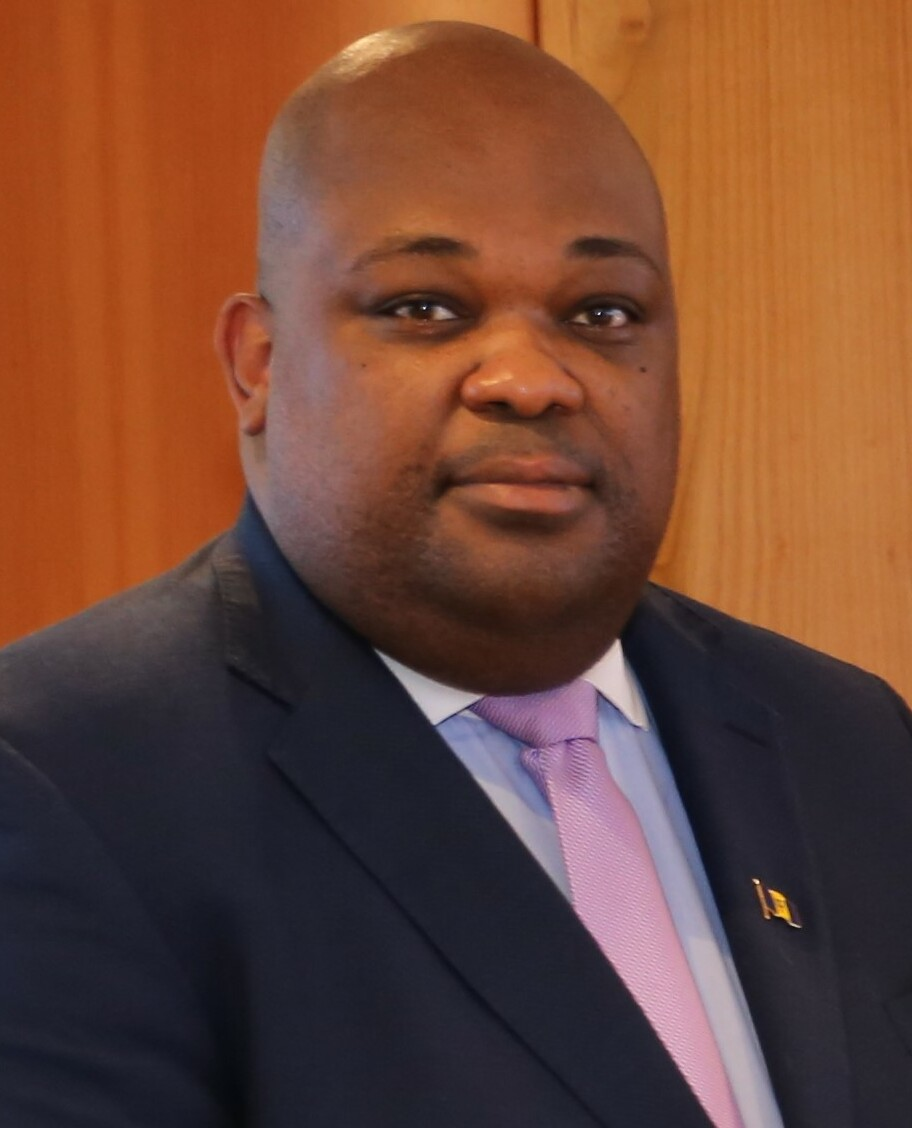
- Chad Blackman in 2022

Minister of Educational Transformation
- Incumbent
- Assumed office 8 January 2024

Member of the Senate of Barbados
- Incumbent
- Assumed office 8 January 2024

MP for Saint James North
- Incumbent
- Assumed office 2025

Personal details
- Born: October 1982 (age 43) Barbados
- Party: Barbados Labour Party
- Education: University of Essex
- Occupation: Politician; former diplomat; international trade law specialist

Chad Blackman (born October 1982) is a Barbadian politician and former diplomat. He now serves as the Minister of Educational Transformation in the Barbados Labour Party administration.

He was appointed to the Senate of Barbados by the Prime Minister of Barbados Mia Amor Mottley, as well as Minister in the Ministry of Economic Affairs and Investment on January 8, 2024. He served as the Senior Advisor to the Director-General of the International Labour Organization, Gilbert Houngbo until January 7, 2024 and was Barbados' Ambassador and Permanent Representative to the United Nations and Geneva, Vienna, and Rome, and former Ambassador to Switzerland, Austria, Serbia and Hungary.

As Ambassador, he was President of the G77 and China Geneva Chapter; Co-ordinator of the Group of Small Island Developing States; Co-ordinator of the Group of Latin America and Caribbean Countries GRULAC, and was a Global Board Member of the United Nations International Gender Champions. Blackman is also an international trade law specialist. Within the Cabinet of the ILO, he has responsibility for Latin America and the Caribbean, the African Region, the United Nations, and external relations and corporate services. He has served as the youth development consultant with the Commonwealth Secretariat in London.

He served as the chair for the Trade and Development, and Trade and Environment Committees in the World Trade Organization (WTO). Blackman is also the first Ambassador of Barbados to Serbia. He also Chaired the SIDS Group in the United Nations Conference on Trade and Development.

An alumnus of the Christ Church Foundation School, Mr. Blackman obtained his bachelor's of law degree and masters in International Trade Law at the University of Essex, United Kingdom.
