= Dwight Sutherland =

Barbadian politician (born 1969)

Dwight Gregory Sutherland (born April 25, 1969, Saint George, Barbados) is a Barbadian politician. He is a member of parliament in the House of Assembly of Barbados. He was elected as a member of parliament to St George South since the 2013 general election. He also serves as the Minister of Housing, Lands and Maintenance since January 24, 2022, in the cabinet of Mia Mottley.
