= Davidson Ishmael =

Barbadian politician

Davidson Ishmael is a Barbadian politician. He is a member of parliament in the House of Assembly of Barbados. He was first elected member of parliament in January 2018. He also serves as the Minister of Industry, Innovation, Science and Technology in the cabinet of Mia Mottley.
