= Adrian Forde =

Barbadian politician

Adrian Ryan Forde is a Barbadian politician. He is a member of parliament in the House of Assembly of Barbados. He was first elected member of parliament in January 2018. He also serves as the Minister of People Empowerment and Elder Affairs in the cabinet of Mia Mottley.
