= Kerrie Symmonds =

Barbadian politician

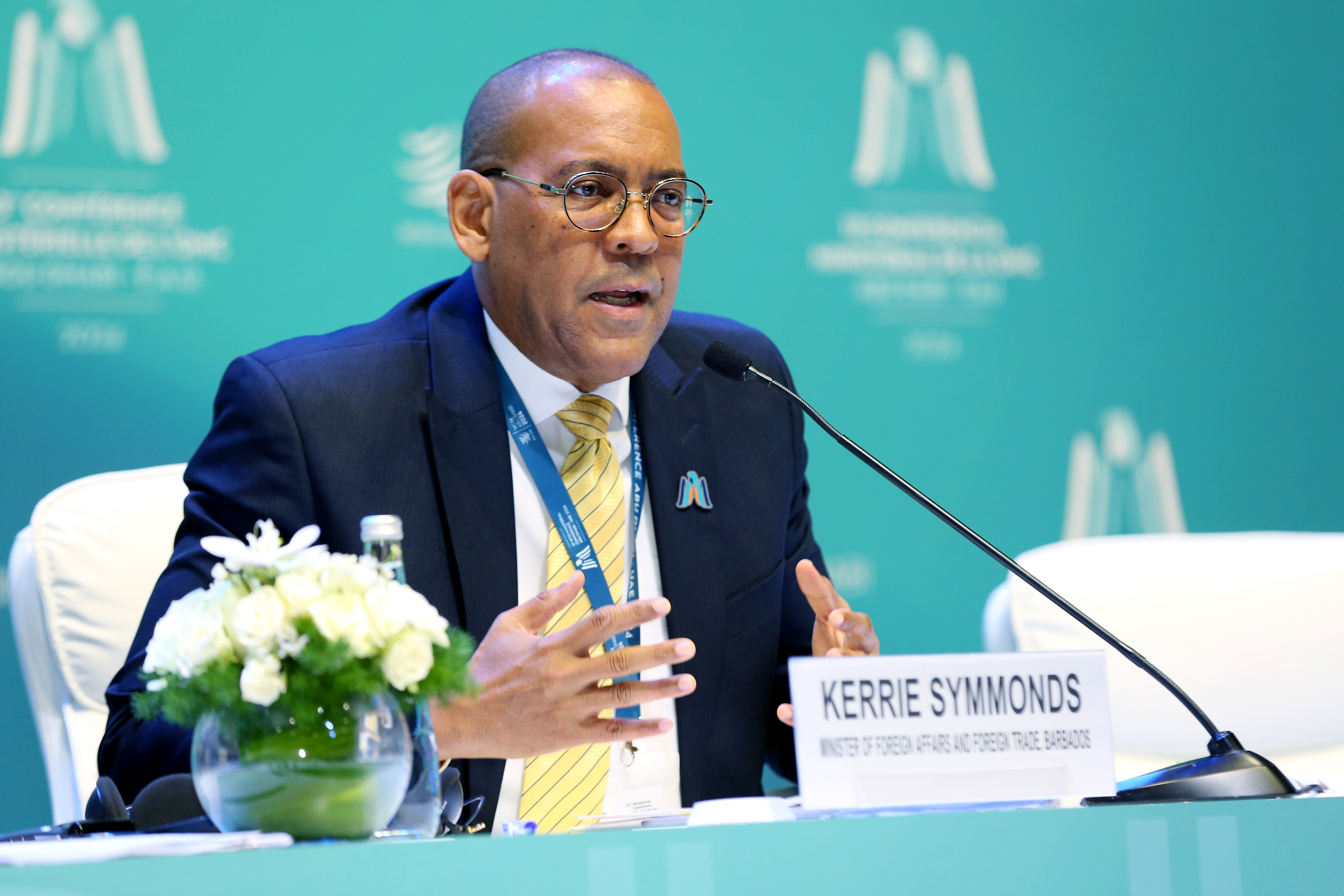

Kerrie Symmonds (born 1 June 1966 in Saint James, Barbados) is a Barbadian lawyer, politician and the cabinet minister in the government of Mia Mottley. He has served as the minister of foreign affairs and foreign trade since 2022, and was previously minister of energy and business development.

== Early life and education ==
Kerrie Drurard Symmonds was born on June 1, 1966. He attended Harrison College and Barbados Community College. He enrolled into the University of the West Indies where he studied Law and Arts. He obtained a BSc in Law and Arts.

== Career ==
Symmonds was elected the first MP of St. James Central, Barbados. Between 2003 and 2008 he served as the Minister of State in the Ministry of Foreign Affairs and Foreign Trade of Barbados. He was the youngest to chair the COTED (Council for Trade and Economic Development) group of CARICOM Ministers. He subsequently served as the Deputy Chairman of Barbados' Joint Parliamentary Committee on Foreign Trade and Deputy Chairman of the Caribbean Broadcasting Corporation. After an unsuccessful run at the 2008 general elections, he was elected into the Barbados House of Assembly on February 21, 2013.

In the 2018 general elections, he was re-elected member of the Barbados House of Assembly and was appointed Minister of Tourism and International Transport in the Mia Mottley Administration. In January 2022, he was reassigned another ministerial portfolio as Minister of Energy and Business Development, Senior Minister coordinating the Productive Sectors by Mia Mottley.

He is a member of the Barbados Labour Party.

== Controversy ==
On February 2, 2018, Symmonds made a statement calling 3 female members of the Barbados Labour Party "1,000 pounds of blubber". This caused an outrage which called for his resignation with other MPs criticizing the statement he made.
