= Solutions Barbados =

Barbadian political party

- Abbreviation: SB
- Chairperson: Grenvile Phillips II
- Founded: 1 July 2015; 10 years ago
- Ideology: Third Way
- Political position: Centre
- Colors: Blue, Green
- Slogan: The Way Forward
- House of Assembly: 0 / 30
- Senate: 0 / 21

Election symbol
- Map of Barbdos

Website
- solutionsbarbados.com

Solutions Barbados (SB) is a minor political party in Barbados. It was first founded by structural engineer Grenville Phillips II on 1 July 2015, and contested the May 2018 Barbadian general election.

On 12 November 2020 following the 2020 St. George North by-election, Phillips announced that he would be leaving elective politics, making no mention whether the party would continue to operate.

In December 2021, after the 2022 Barbadian general election were called, Solutions Barbados stated that it would contest as a coalition with other smaller parties. Phillips himself, however, did not choose to contest for elected office.

== Elections ==
Solutions Barbados contested the 2018 general election with a slate of 28 candidates. The party received 2.7% of the votes, but failed to win any seats.

Election	Party Leader	Votes	%	Seats	+/–	Position	Government
2018	Grenville Phillips II	1,913	2.7	0 / 30	0	▲3rd	Extra-parliamentary
2022	Grenville Phillips II	699	0.61	0 / 30	0	▼4th	Extra-parliamentary
