= Parliament of Barbados =

Bicameral legislature of Barbados

Coordinates: 13°05′49.15″N 59°36′50.11″W

Type
- Type: Bicameral
- Houses: • Senate • House of Assembly

History
- Founded: 26 June 1639; 387 years ago

Leadership
- President of the Senate: Reginald Farley, BLP since 2020
- Assembly Speaker: Arthur Holder, BLP since 5 June 2018
- Prime Minister: Mia Mottley, BLP since 25 May 2018
- Leader of the Opposition: Vacant since 11 February 2026

Structure
- Seats: Senate: 21; House of Assembly: 30
- Senate political groups: Government: BLP (12); Opposition: Ind. (7); DLP (1); FOD (1)
- House of Assembly political groups: Government: BLP (30); Opposition: Vacant

Elections
- Senate voting system: Appointment by the President
- House of Assembly voting system: First-past-the-post
- Last House of Assembly election: 11 February 2026
- Next Senate election: 2030

Meeting place
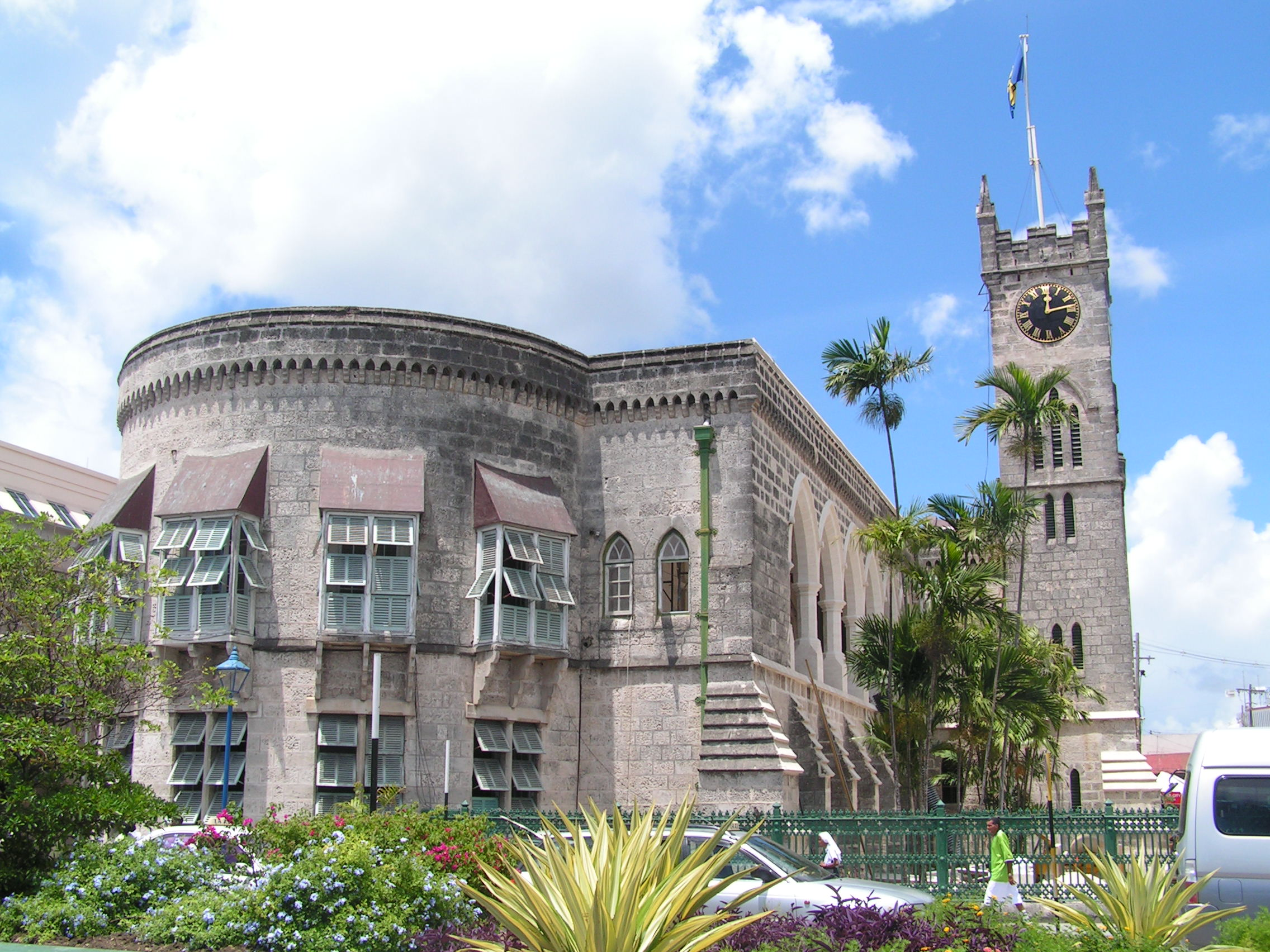
- Bridgetown, Barbados

The Parliament of Barbados is the national legislature of Barbados. It is accorded legislative supremacy by Chapter V of the Constitution of Barbados. The Parliament is bicameral in composition and is formally made up of two houses, an appointed Senate (Upper house) and an elected House of Assembly (Lower house), as well as the president of Barbados who is indirectly elected by both. Both houses sit in separate chambers in the Parliament Buildings (commonly known as "The Public Buildings"), in the national capital Bridgetown in Saint Michael.

The Senate is made up of twenty-one Senators, while the House consists of thirty Members of Parliament (MPs) in addition to the Honourable Speaker of the House. Members to serve in the Cabinet of Barbados may be chosen by the Prime Minister from either the House of Assembly or Senate, (the Prime Minister alone who must be chosen by the President must come from the House of Assembly.)

In theory, supreme legislative power is vested in all three components equally; in practice during modern times, real power is vested in the House of Assembly, as the President generally acts on the advice of the Prime Minister and the powers of the Senate have been limited.

The Parliament of Barbados is originally patterned after the Parliament of England, so the structure, functions, and procedures of the parliament are based on the Westminster system of government.

Sittings of both House and Senate are usually held once per month, with other meetings called as necessary. The House sits on Tuesdays beginning at 10:30am, and are broadcast live on the local radio station, Quality 100.7 FM and on Parliament TV. Sittings of the Senate take place on Wednesdays.

As of February 2020 the government has been renting various private buildings around Barbados, including the Worthing Corporate Centre and Conference Centre (on 15 Sep 2020 for the State Opening of Parliament) to host Parliament without any firm return date mentioned as to when it might return to using the capital site.

== History ==
Established on 26 June 1639, the Parliament of Barbados is the third oldest legislature in the Americas (behind the Virginia General Assembly and Bermuda House of Assembly), and is among the oldest in the Commonwealth of Nations.

The genesis of a legislature in Barbados was introduced by Governor Henry Hawley, creating a structure of governance to Barbados, itself patterned after the Parliament of England). The then unicameral Parliament originally was tasked with establishing a system of laws and was completely under the domination of the island's planter-class. The first meeting of the Barbados Assembly was held in 1639.

The initial location known as the "Sessions House" which was situated in the Marlhill, which is now known as Spry Street. Built by Captain Henry Hawley, the building may have originally accommodated his Courts of Law. (On 25 June 1989, a monument was unveiled to commemorate the site outside of the current Central Bank.)

By 1653, the Assembly moved to the State House then located in Bridgetown area known as Cheapside (then encompassing Broad Street). In 1668 the State House was destroyed by a great fire started by an explosion of the Bridgetown military magazine. Over the next century, the colony's elected officials assembled at various locations all over Bridgetown, which were rented taverns and homes of local merchants and landlords. The Roebuck Tavern located on Roebuck Street was a favourite assembly point and was also owned by Henry Hawley. The movement of the Assembly among the various taverns in the town eventually presented an irony for the thriving colony. Governor Atkins, who was attending a meeting at Gwynn's Tavern in 1674 commented, "I must confess I am a little astonished to see so honourable an Assembly to meet in a place so considerable as the island is, and have no house to receive us but a public tavern" (TOB 71). For many years the Barbados Assembly continued to meet in various places. In 1724 an Act was passed providing for a building for the Council and Assembly, Law Courts and gaol. The building located on Coleridge Street was completed in 1731–1732, yet the House of Assembly still often met at times at different private houses and taverns. The current Parliament Buildings were built in the neo-Gothic style in the early 1870s on the site of what was known as the "New Burnt District", which was part of a 10-acre area in the town that was destroyed by the great fire in 1860.

In 1968 the Barbados Parliament was presented two complete libraries of Parliamentary and constitutional works of reference from the British House of Commons to celebrate political Independence with membership to the Commonwealth.

The Parliament of Barbados in its current form was first introduced following the 1961 general elections. In 1963 the colonial era Legislative Council was disestablished. In its place came the Senate in 1964 (due to Barbados' status as a colony of Great Britain). As the years went by, governance in Barbados continued to change in structure until both of the present chambers assumed their present numbers.

== Legislative functions ==
Parliament is empowered by Article 35(l) of the Constitution to make laws for the peace, order, and good government of Barbados. The Constitution also empowers Parliament to:

- Determine the privileges, immunities, and powers of the Senate and the House of Assembly and the members thereof;
- alter or amend any of the provisions of the constitution;

Following amendments to the Constitution that initiated a transition to a republican form of government in 2021, Parliament is also responsible for electing the country's President.

== Enactment clause ==
"BE IT ENACTED by the Queen's Most Excellent Majesty, by and with the advice and consent of the Senate and House of Assembly of Barbados and by the authority of the same as follows:-"

"ENACTED by the Parliament of Barbados as follows:-"

== Members in Parliament ==
As of the 20 February 2026, the Barbados Labour Party (BLP) holds all 30 seats in the House of the Assembly. In the senate, the BLP holds 12 seats with the Democratic Labour Party and the Friends of Democracy holding 1 seat each and independents holding 7 seats.

== Election date ==
The next general election in Barbados is expected to be held by 2027 the latest. According to the Constitution of Barbados elections can take place no longer than every five years from the first sitting of Parliament. The last general election was held on 19 January 2022.

The Constitution of Barbados also establishes that at any time before this date the Government in power may seek a new mandate from the electorate and may ask for the current sitting of Parliament be dissolved by the President and allow for the announcement of a new date for General elections. The President of Barbados may also announce a new date of General elections should the Prime Minister in power not survive a vote of no confidence motion.

== International affiliation(s) ==
- ACP–EU Joint Parliamentary Assembly
- Canada-CARICOM Parliamentary Friendship Group
- Commonwealth Parliamentary Association
- ParlAmericas
- Parliamentarians for Global Action (PGA)
- Pink Parliament, an initiative seeking to inspire & encourage more women to pursue careers in politics

== Official Gazette / Hansard ==
- The Official Gazette of Barbados

== See also ==
- Constitution of Barbados
- List of parliamentary constituencies of Barbados
- List of speakers of the House of Assembly of Barbados
- List of presidents of the Legislative Council of Barbados
- List of presidents of the Senate of Barbados
- List of members of the Senate of Barbados
- List of members of the House of Assembly of Barbados
- List of legislatures by country
