= List of Barbadian people =

People related to Barbados

This is a list of people from or associated closely with Barbados. The list covers notable individuals who have garnered recognition in artistic, cultural, economic, historical, notorious, and political arenas.

== Actors ==
- Earl Maynard (born 1935), actor, bodybuilder from Barbados.
- Redd Pepper (born 1961), voice actor born in Barbados.

== Athletes ==
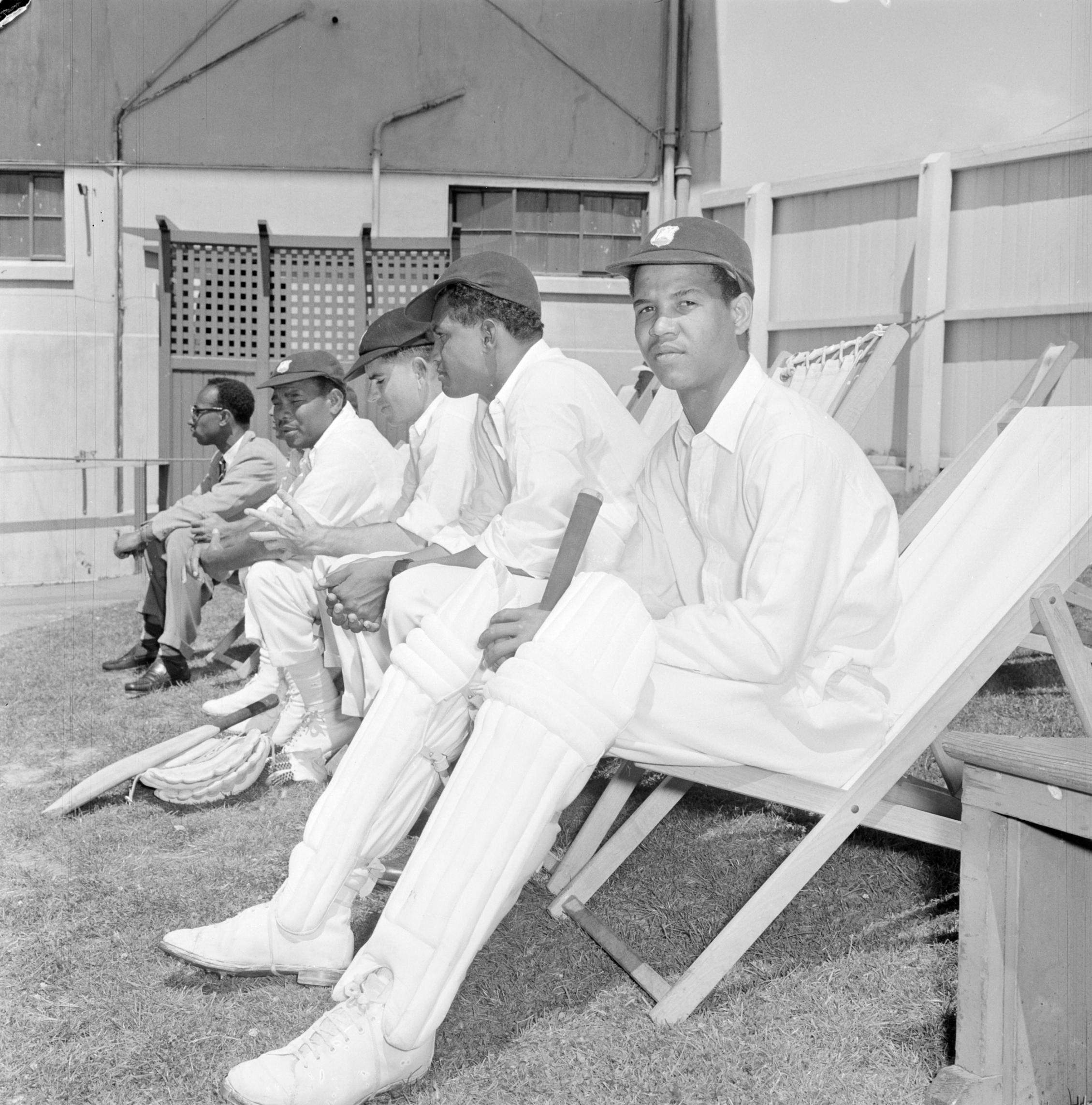
West Indian cricket team members,1956, including Garfield Sobers and Everton Weekes.

- Robert Bailey (born 1968), American football player born in Barbados.
- Andrea Blackett (born 1976), Barbadian hurdler and coach.
- Emmerson Boyce (born 1979), Barbadian footballer and coach.
- Joel Garner (born 1952), cricketer born in Barbados.
- Gordon Greenidge (born 1951), cricketer born in St. Peter, Barbados.
- Ramon Harewood (born 1987) American football player born and raised in Barbados.
- Desmond Haynes (born 1956), cricketer born in Barbados.
- Hadan Holligan (born 1995), Barbadian footballer.
- Conrad Hunte (1932–1999), cricketer from Barbados.
- Darian King (born 1992), professional tennis player from Barbados.
- Zane Maloney (born 2003), racing driver from Barbados.
- Malcolm Marshall (1858–1999) cricketer from Barbados.
- Anton Norris (born 1940), high jumper and cricket player from Barbados.
- Kemar Roach (born 1988), cricketer born at St. Lucy, Barbados.
- Sam Seale (born 1962), American football player born in Barbados.
- Alana Shipp (born 1982), American/Israeli professional bodybuilder born in Barbados.
- Garfield Sobers (1936–2026), Barbadian cricketer and all rounder.
- Obadele Thompson (born 1976) Olympic athlete from Barbados.
- Clyde Walcott (1926–2006), cricketer from Barbados.
- Everton Weekes (1925–2020), cricketer from Barbados.
- Frank Worrell (1924–1967), cricketer from Barbados.

== Educators ==
- Avinash Persaud (born 1966), professor and special envoy to the prime minister of Barbados.

== Entrepreneurs ==
- Frank L. White (1867 - 1938), American chef born in Barbados.

== Mariners ==
- Stede Bonnet (1688–1718), pirate and landowner born in Barbados.
- William T. Shorey (1859–1919), whaling ship captain born in Barbados.

== Musicians ==
- Vita Chambers (born 1993), Canadian singer raised in Barbados.
- Cover Drive – reggae group from Barbados.
- Doug E. Fresh (born 1966), rapper born in Barbados.
- Grynner (born 1946), calypso artist from Barbados.
- Alison Hinds (born 1970), soca singer raised in Barbados.
- Jackie Opel (1937–1970), singer from Barbados.
- Jaicko (born 1991), R&B/pop singer-songwriter from Barbados.
- Krosfyah, soca band from Barbados.
- Charles D. Lewis (born 1955), bassist, producer from Barbados.
- Hal Linton (born 1986), singer from Barbados.
- Livvi Franc (born 1988), singer from Barbados.
- Magnet Man, singer and musician from Barbados.
- Zeeteah Massiah (born 1956), singer born in Barbados.
- Mighty Gabby (born 1948), singer from Barbados.
- Rayvon (born 1968), American singer born in Barbados.
- Red Plastic Bag, calypsonian from Barbados.
- Rihanna (born 1988), singer from Barbados.
- RoRo, singer-songwriter born in Barbados.
- Shontelle (born 1985), pop, reggae, and R&B singer from Barbados.
- Square One (band), soca band from Barbados.
- Emile Straker (1936–2026), musician from Barbados.
- Arturo Tappin, saxophonist from Barbados.
- Joseph L. Walcott -immigrant from Barbados, founded Wally's Cafe Jazz Club in Boston.

== Political leaders ==
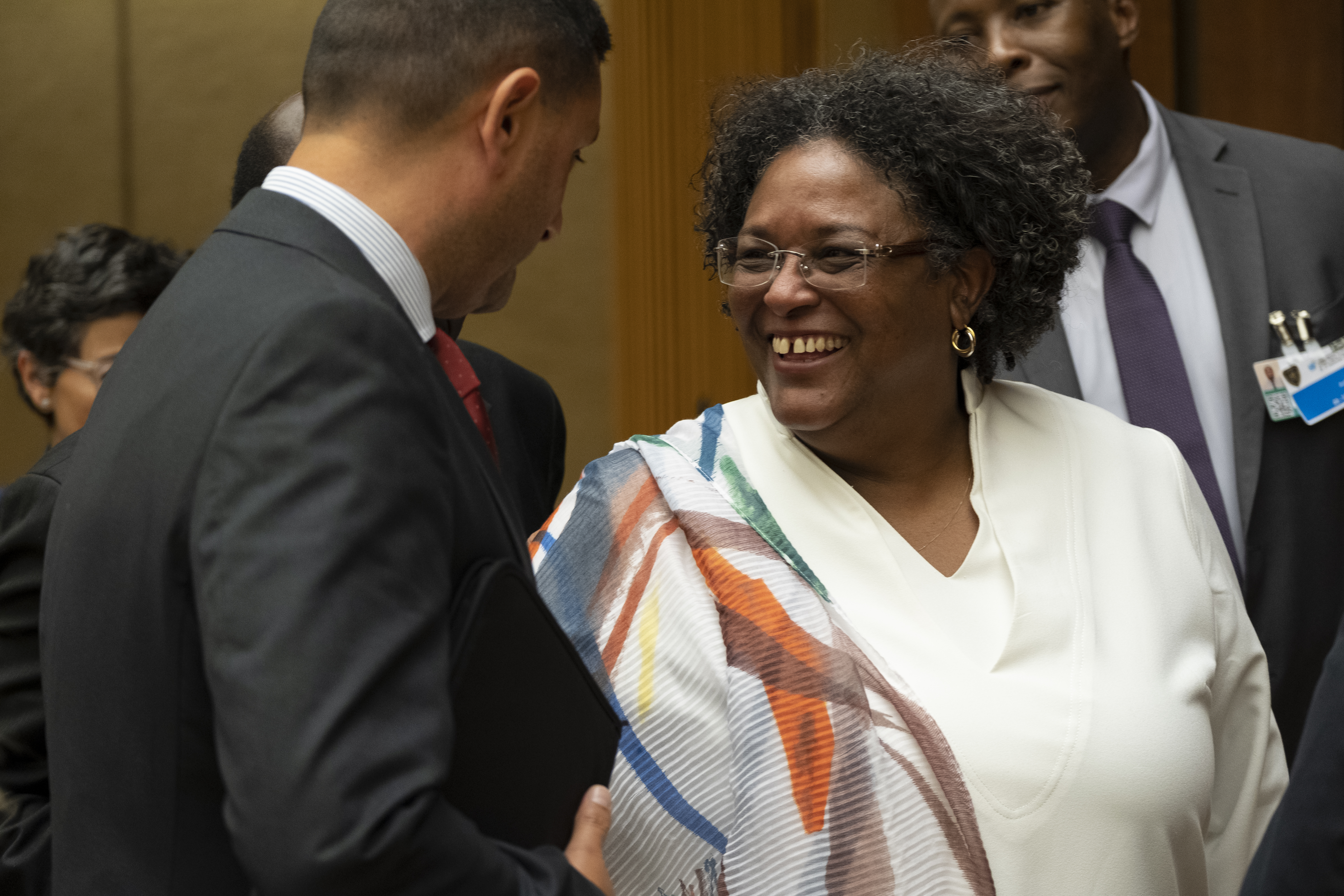
Mia Mottley in Geneva in 2019

- Grantley Herbert Adams (1898–1971), premier of Barbados.
- Tom Adams (politician) (1931–1985), served as Prime Minister of Barbados.
- Owen Arthur (1949–2020), served as Prime Minister of Barbados.
- Errol Barrow (1920–1987), served as Prime Minister of Barbados.
- Nita Barrow (1916 - 1995), politician from Barbados.
- Courtney Blackman (1933 - 2021), served as ambassador from Barbados to the United States.
- Edna Ermyntrude Bourne – the first woman to be elected to the House of Assembly of Barbados.
- London Bourne (1793 - 1869), former Barbadian slave who became a merchant and abolitionist.
- Bussa, leader of a slave revolt, killed in Barbados in 1816.
- Esther Byer-Suckoo (born 1968), policiian from Barbados.
- Shirley Chisholm (1924 - 2005), United States Congresswoman raised in childhood in Barbados.
- Anne C. Cools (born 1943), Canadian senator born in Barbados.
- Hugh Gordon Cummins (1891 - 1970), politician from Barbados.
- Gertrude Eastmond (died 2024), the second woman to be elected to the House of Assembly of Barbados.
- Sarah Ann Gill (1795 - 1866), national hero of Barbados.
- Charles Wilton Wood Greenidge (1889 - 1972), organizational head in Barbados.
- Clifford Husbands (1926 -2017), politician from Barbados.
- Clyde Mascoll (born 1959), Barbadian government official.
- Billie Miller (born 1944), politician from Barbados.
- Richard B. Moore (1893 - 1978), Civil rights activist from Barbados.
- Mia Mottley (born 1965), 8th Prime Minister of Barbados.
- Charles O'Neale (1879 - 1936), National Hero of Barbados.
- Clement Payne (1904 - 1971), National Hero of Barbados.
- Samuel Jackman Prescod (1806 -1871), politician from Barbados.
- Lloyd Erskine Sandiford (1937 - 2023), former Barbadian prime minister.
- Arleigh Winston Scott (1900 - 1976), governor general of Barbados.
- David Simmons (judge) (born 1940), politician from Barbados.
- Hugh Springer (1913 -1994), politician from Barbados.
- David Thompson (1961 - 2010), former Barbadian prime minister.
- Elizabeth Thompson (born 1961) politician from Barbados.
- Frank Leslie Walcott (1916 - 1999), National Hero of Barbados.
- Deighton Lisle Ward (1909 -1984), governor general of Barbados.
- Nellie Weekes (1896–1990), Bajan nurse and women's rights activist.
- Maizie Barker-Welch (1927 - 2024), Barbados politician and women's rights activist.
- Althea Wiggins, politician from Barbados.

== Scientists ==
- Shelly-Ann Cox (1988 - 2026), chief fisheries officer of Barbados.
- Alan Emtage (born 1964), Internet pioneer from Barbados.
- Ken R. Harewood, molecular biologist from Barbados.

== Writers and intellectuals ==
Karen Lord at the Hugos, Worldcon, Helsinki, 2017.

- Adisa Andwele, rhythm poet from Barbados.
- Hilary Beckles (born 1955), historian from Barbados.
- Kamau Brathwaite (1930 - 2020), poet and academic from Barbados.
- Austin Clarke (1934 - 2016), author and poet born in Barbados.
- Tony Cozier (1940 - 2016), cricket writer and broadcaster from Barbados.
- Neville Goddard (1905 - 1972), mystic and author from Barbados.
- Abel Hendy Jones Greenidge (1865 - 1906), writer on history and law born in Barbados.
- Ted Harris, Sweden-based pastor, theologian and writer born in Barbados.
- Agymah Kamau, novelist from Barbados.
- Odimumba Kwamdela (1942 - 2019), poet and novelist born and raised in Barbados.
- George Lamming (1927 - 2022), author and poet born and raised in Barbados.
- Karen Lord (born 1968), writer of speculative fiction born in Barbados.
- Glenville Lovell – author, playwright, dancer from Barbados.

== Others ==
- Frederick Atkins (died 2005), convicted murderer, executed in Barbados.

== See also ==
- Barbados
- List of Eastern Caribbean people
