= Recognition of same-sex unions in Barbados =

Barbados does not recognise same-sex unions. In September 2020, the government announced its intention to enact civil unions for same-sex couples, providing several of the rights, benefits and obligations of marriage. It also announced the possibility of holding a referendum on legalising same-sex marriage.

== Civil unions and limited rights ==
In July 2020, the government launched the "Welcome Stamp" visa program, allowing foreign workers to stay in Barbados for up to one year. After receiving criticism that the program only allowed workers to bring their opposite-sex spouse with them, the government changed the program rules to allow workers to bring their same-sex spouse as well. Prime Minister Mia Mottley said in response, "I want to say that as long as I am Prime Minister of this nation, we welcome all. Everyone. At this country that has been forged regrettably in the bowels of discrimination cannot want to discriminate against anybody for any reason, all must breathe in this world, all must breathe in this country." On 15 September 2020, the government announced its intention to pass a form of civil union, providing same-sex couples some of the rights and benefits of marriage, and after that hold a referendum on the issue of same-sex marriage. Governor General Sandra Mason said in a speech to the Parliament that the country must have a "frank discussion" and "end discrimination in all forms".

Mr President, my Government is prepared to recognise a form of civil unions for couples of the same gender so as to ensure that no human being in Barbados will be discriminated against, in exercise of civil rights that ought to be theirs.

LGBT activist Alexa Hoffmann said Mason's speech was filed with "smoke and mirrors, tiptoeing around and the use of buzz words. […] A nod is being given to civil unions but yet anything that relates to the LGBT community physically being able to practice that relationship is still criminalized and completely forbidden", referencing the fact that Barbadian law at the time criminalised same-sex sexual relations. Homosexuality was decriminalised in Barbados in 2022. Bishop Michael Maxwell said that no priest in the Diocese of Barbados would be permitted to officiate at a civil union ceremony, "The position really is that our church continues to stand against what it considers to be same-sex marriages."

== Same-sex marriage ==
Recognition of same-sex unions in the Lesser Antilles and Puerto Rico Same-sex marriage Unregistered cohabitation Island subject to IACHR advisory opinion No recognition of same-sex couples Constitutional ban on same-sex marriage Same-sex sexual activity illegal but penalties not enforced

=== Background ===
In June 2016, Attorney General Adriel Brathwaite said the government was not considering changing the law to allow for same-sex marriages; "As a lawmaker, if Jane decides she wants to live with Janice, that is their business as far I am concerned. But I will not change the law to allow them to be married in Barbados. I will not stop them from being able to access health care, being able to have a job, or to be able to eat and sleep and do all the things I do." Activist Donnya Piggott said at the time that the local LGBT community was "not interested in pressuring authorities to legalize same-sex marriages".

In March 2022, attorney at law Lalu Hanuman suggested that the Marriage Act may not prohibit same-sex marriage, and called on same-sex couples to challenge the law in court. "It does not say in the prohibited or void sections that a man can't marry a man or a woman can't marry a woman. I think it ought to be considered a test case where an LGBTQ person approaches the magistrate to get the bands published … and tries to get married to someone of their same gender. I am confident it will be refused at the Magistrate's Court level, but then challenge it all the way up to the Caribbean Court of Justice and I think it could well succeed", Hanuman said. The act uses gender-neutral language, with the parties to a marriage referred to as "persons", except in section 3 which states that "a marriage solemnised between a man and a woman" is void if the partners are related.

=== 2018 Inter-American Court of Human Rights advisory opinion ===
On 9 January 2018, the Inter-American Court of Human Rights (IACHR) issued an advisory opinion that parties to the American Convention on Human Rights should grant same-sex couples "accession to all existing domestic legal systems of family registration, including marriage, along with all rights that derive from marriage". The advisory opinion states that:

The State must recognize and guarantee all rights derived from a family bond between persons of the same sex in accordance with the provisions of Articles 11.2 and 17.1 of the American Convention. (...) in accordance with articles 1.1, 2, 11.2, 17, and 24 of the American Convention, it is necessary to guarantee access to all the existing figures in domestic legal systems, including the right to marry. (..) To ensure the protection of all the rights of families formed by same-sex couples, without discrimination with respect to those that are constituted by heterosexual couples.

Barbados ratified the American Convention on Human Rights on 27 November 1982 and recognized the court's jurisdiction on 4 June 2000.

== Religious performance ==
The Church in the Province of the West Indies, part of the Anglican Communion, opposes same-sex marriage. Following the Church of England's decision to allow clergy to bless same-sex civil marriages in 2023, the Church in the Province of the West Indies issued a statement reaffirming marriage as a "creation ordinance, a gift of God in creation and a means of His grace. Marriage, defined as a faithful, committed, permanent and legally sanctioned relationship between a man and a woman, is central to the stability and health of human society. It continues to provide the best context for the raising of children." Further, it described same-sex marriage as "totally unacceptable on theological and cultural grounds". In 2020, Bishop Michael Maxwell had already expressed the diocese's opposition to same-sex unions and called marriage "really between a male and a female. It is the best arrangement towards family life." He added, "We are not condoning the whole thing in relation to same-sex union, but the civil union, I interpret that as something that is not blessed by the church or condoned by the church. So that is really the prerogative of the Government."

== See also ==
- Buggery Act
- LGBT rights in Barbados
- Recognition of same-sex unions in the Americas
