= LGBTQ rights in Barbados =

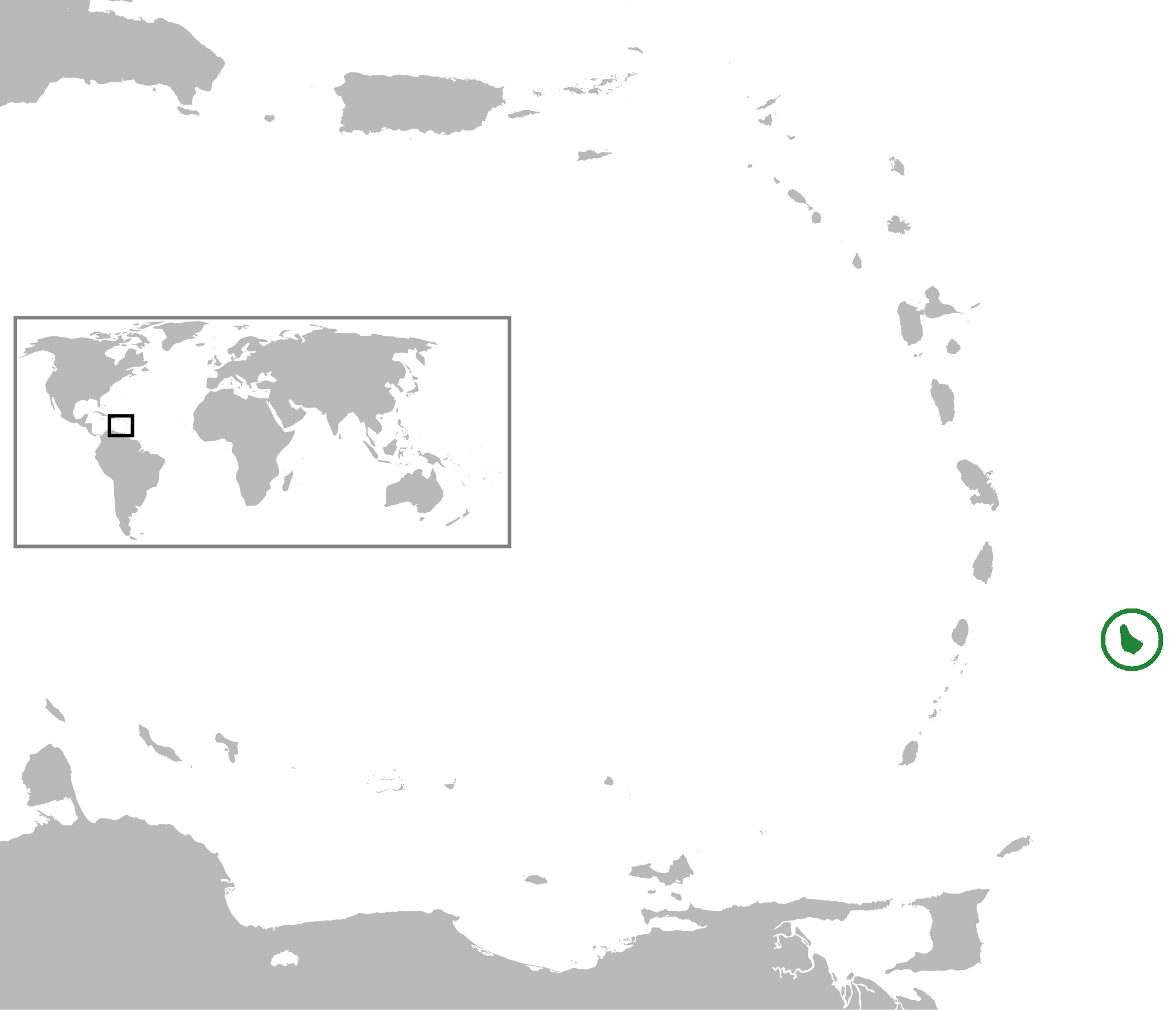
- Barbados
- Legal status: Legal since 2022
- Gender identity: No
- Discrimination protections: Sexual orientation protections in employment since 2020 and by constitution since 2022

Family rights
- Recognition of relationships: No recognition of same-sex unions
- Adoption: No

Lesbian, gay, bisexual, and transgender (LGBT) people in Barbados do not possess the same legal rights as non-LGBT people. In December 2022, the courts ruled Barbados' laws against buggery and "gross indecency" were unconstitutional and struck them from the Sexual Offences Act. However, there is no recognition of same-sex relationships and only limited legal protections against discrimination.

Because of Barbados' small population, many LGBT Barbadians choose to remain in the closet in fear that coming out would expose them to the entire country. Barbados held its first Pride Week in July 2018. Activities raising awareness and acceptance were hosted throughout the country. Pride celebrations were held again in July 2019 but did not go ahead in 2020, when numerous festivals were cancelled due to COVID-19.

In September 2020, the government announced plans to recognize "some form" of civil unions between same-sex partners, as well as hold a referendum on gay marriage. The plans were welcomed by some gay rights campaigners, but criticized by others, who felt that the civil union proposal was unnecessarily vague and the marriage referendum was likely to fail.

== Legality of same-sex sexual activity ==
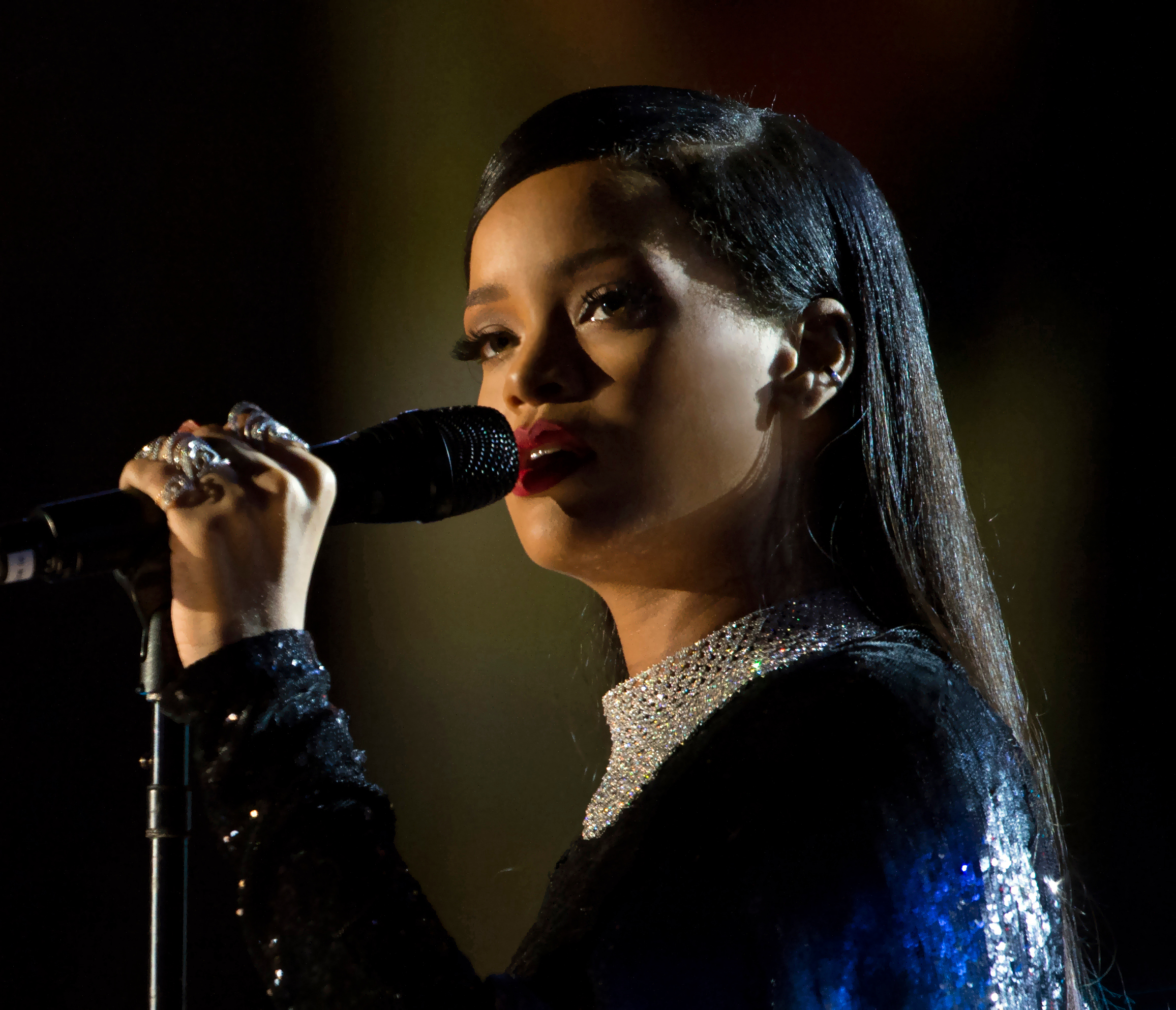
Barbadian singer Rihanna, famous on the island, has often expressed support for LGBT rights.

Before the December 2022 court ruling that struck down buggery and gross indecency laws, same-sex and different-sex anal and oral sex were criminalised under Chapter 154, Sections 9 and 12 of the Sexual Offences Act. Section 9 criminalised "buggery", regardless of whether the act was done in private and consensual, or whether it was done between two men or a man and a woman. Section 12 criminalised "serious indecency", which was defined as any act "involving the use of the genital organs for the purpose of arousing or gratifying sexual desire." Punishment for "buggery" was life imprisonment, while the maximum penalty for "serious indecency" was ten years in prison if the act was committed on or towards a person aged 16 or older. The law was rarely enforced, however.

=== Decriminalization efforts ===
In 2018, Human Rights Watch (HRW) published a report entitled: "I Have to Leave to be me: Discriminatory Laws Against LGBT People in the Eastern Caribbean". The organization called on Barbados to repeal Section 9 and urged the Government of Barbados to create a safe environment for all Barbadians. A government minister subsequently warned that external forces were trying to impose same-sex marriage on the country. HRW called the minister's response a "cheap political trick", as their report does not mention same-sex marriage at all, and instead focuses on the discrimination and harassment LGBT people face in Barbados.

In August 2016 and April 2018, the Belize Supreme Court and the Trinidad and Tobago High Court, respectively, ruled that laws criminalizing homosexuality are unconstitutional. These rulings have been welcomed by Barbadian LGBT activists, who hope to have their own law repealed as well. However, Barbados' Constitution contains a "savings clause", which protects laws inherited by the former British Empire from constitutional review, even if these laws run counter to fundamental human rights, thus making any legal challenge to the buggery law difficult. As such, Barbadian LGBT activists have filed suit in international courts instead. In June 2018, transgender activist, Alexa Hoffmann, and two other Bajans, a lesbian and a gay man, filed a case with the Inter-American Commission on Human Rights (IACHR) challenging Chapter 154, sections 9 and 12 of the Sexual Offences Act with the help of by Trans Advocates and Agitation Barbados, the Canadian HIV/AIDS Legal Network, the University of Toronto International Human Rights Programme and other local and international advocates. The case was reviewed by the IACHR in 2018. In late July 2019, the Commission gave the Bajan Government three months to respond to the petition. If the state refuses to repeal its laws, the commission can refer the matter to the Inter-American Court of Human Rights, which can issue a binding decision mandating that Barbados repeal the laws. At a global homosexuality decriminalisation conference that was held in Barbados by LGBT activists, Minister of People Empowerment and Elder Affairs Cynthia Y. Forde said, "We have no fear of legal challenge to any of our legislation. That is how new law is made and how jurisprudence is enhanced and kept relevant." In response, several evangelical church leaders plan to meet to formulate an official response to the case.

The Anglican Bishop of Barbados, as well as the Catholic Church, have come out in opposition to the buggery law, stating that, while they morally oppose homosexuality, governments must respect the rights of all persons, including LGBT people. On the other hand, some more fundamentalist, extremist and religious fanatic groups have attacked LGBT activists and LGBT people more broadly. These include the New Testament Church, which has made factually incorrect and unscientific comments regarding sexual orientation, claiming that heterosexuality, homosexuality and bisexuality are chosen, and has argued that discrimination against LGBT people should be encouraged, while at the same time victim playing.

== Recognition of same-sex relationships ==
There is no recognition of same-sex unions in Barbados. In June 2016, Attorney General Adriel Brathwaite said the Barbados Government would not change the law to allow for same-sex marriages. On January 9, 2018, the Inter-American Court of Human Rights (IACHR) issued an advisory opinion that parties to the American Convention on Human Rights should grant same-sex couples "accession to all existing domestic legal systems of family registration, including marriage, along with all rights that derive from marriage". In July 2020, the government launched the "Welcome Stamp" visa program, allowing foreign workers to stay on Barbados for up to one year. After receiving criticism that the program only allowed workers to bring their opposite-sex spouse with them, the government changed the program rules to allow same-sex spouses as well. On September 15, 2020, the government announced its intention to pass a form of civil union, and after that holding a referendum on the issue of same sex marriage, in order to end discrimination on the island.

== Adoption and parenting ==
Same-sex couples are unable to legally adopt in Barbados. While not explicitly prohibited or regulated by law, the Barbados Fertility Centre offers IVF and artificial insemination treatments to lesbian couples. Surrogacy is illegal in Barbados.

== Discrimination protections ==
In August 2020, the Barbados Parliament passed the Employment (Prevention of Discrimination) Act, 2020, which prohibits employment discrimination on the basis of sex, sexual orientation, marital status and domestic partnership status, among other grounds. Barbadian activist Alexa D.V. Hoffmann has argued that the bill excludes protections for trans workers because "gender identity" and "gender expression" are not listed as protected grounds of discrimination.

In the December 2022 ruling decriminalizing sodomy, which was published in May 2023, the Barbados High Court found that discrimination based on sexual orientation was unconstitutional.

== LGBT rights movement in Barbados ==
In 2013, Donnya Piggott and Ro-Ann Mohammed founded the association Barbados Gays, Lesbians and All-Sexuals Against Discrimination as an organization to create an education mechanism and open public dialogue in a supportive manner for the LGBT community of Barbados. Barbados held its first small pride event in November 2017. In July 2018, despite fear from backlash, around 120 people marched in the first gay pride parade on Rihanna Drive, in the capital Bridgetown. Prime Minister Mia Mottley, elected in May 2018, is reportedly "pro-LGBT".

== Social conditions ==
Recognition of same-sex unions in the Lesser Antilles and Puerto Rico Same-sex marriage Unregistered cohabitation Island subject to IACHR advisory opinion No recognition of same-sex couples Constitutional ban on same-sex marriage Same-sex sexual activity illegal but penalties not enforced

In February 2018, although she allowed him to stay over at her place due to personal issues, Brandon Coward attacked Bajan trans woman activist Alexa Hoffmann with a meat cleaver. The attack left Hoffmann with serious injuries, including to her throat. In April 2019, Coward was convicted and ordered to pay Hoffmann BDS$460 (US$230) or face three months in prison.

On 20 November 2018, the first candlelight vigil was held in Barbados for transgender and gender non-conforming lives lost to transphobic and gender-based violence globally. This was the second demonstration for the Transgender Day of Remembrance (TDoR) in the country, the first being a "Flash Stand for Equality and Inclusion" dedicated to transgender persons, which was held on 24 November 2017 as one of the launching activities of the first official Barbados Pride.

=== Homosexual refugee claims ===
In 2011, the Government of Barbados said it was investigating claims that some gay Barbadians were seeking refugee status in Canada. In 2016, a Guyanese newspaper reported that over 300 members of the LGBT community in Barbados were seeking asylum in Canada, the United Kingdom and the United States because of persecution at home. The Bajan Minister for Foreign Affairs, Maxine McClean, stated a concern of the Government at these applications attempting to secure refugee status in Canada since two of the nine applications to the Canadian Government had already been denied and questions have been raised as to whether it is an attempt at abusing the refugee system to Canada.

The Bajan organization United Gays and Lesbians Against AIDS, Barbados (UGLAAB) stated it was also looking to conduct its own investigation on the same allegations. The Barbadian ambassador to the United States, John Beale, later commented to the local press that some of the other nations in region were among the highest number of such refugee applications to the United States, but he went on to say that the U.S. Embassy to Bridgetown had not yet reported any specific problems within Barbados to the United States State Department. The ambassador highlighted that sodomy laws were a part of statute law for Barbados and that the Barbadian Government should perhaps consider formally retiring those laws to maintain Barbados' good image internationally.

=== International relations ===
In 2011, the prime minister of the United Kingdom, David Cameron, stated during the Commonwealth Heads of Government Meeting (CHOGM) in Australia that his Government would find it difficult to provide aid for countries which still had laws banning sodomy on their statute books. Thereafter, the Attorney General for Barbados Adriel Brathwaite stated publicly that Barbados would not be dictated to by the United Kingdom. Following the statement, several members of Barbados' openly gay community stated that Barbados should begin to offer packaged tourism deals for gay tourists. However, an informal comment line by the Barbados Nation newspaper found that plan to be disliked by some. Following the UK's comment, the Inter-American Court of Human Rights established a unit to tackle gay rights. It noted the problems some of the laws in the region presented and stated that it would "promote the harmonious development of all its work areas based on the interdependence and indivisibility of all human rights and the need to protect the rights of all individuals and groups historically subjected to discrimination."

=== Public opinion ===
Recent polls conducted by Caribbean Development Research Services Inc. (CADRES) have found Barbadians to be more tolerant than previous years. In a 2016 poll conducted by CADRES, 67% of Barbadians described themselves as tolerant of the LGBT community. Another 82% also opposed discrimination against the LGBT community. In recent years, due in part to the rapid legalization of same-sex marriage in many countries including the United States, many American evangelical ministers have come to Barbados. Human rights activists have accused them of spreading and preaching violence and hatred. Owing to these evangelical ministers, homophobic rhetoric in Barbados has become more widespread.

== Summary table ==
| Same-sex sexual activity legal | Yes (Since 2022) |
| Equal age of consent (16) | Yes (Since 2022) |
| Anti-discrimination laws in employment only | Yes (Since 2020 by statute and constitutionally since 2022; sexual orientation only) |
| Anti-discrimination laws in the provision of goods and services | Yes (Constitutionally since 2022; sexual orientation only) |
| Anti-discrimination laws in all other areas (Incl. indirect discrimination, hate speech) | Yes (Constitutionally since 2022; sexual orientation only) |
| Same-sex marriages | No |
| Recognition of same-sex couples | No |
| Stepchild adoption by same-sex couples | No |
| Joint adoption by same-sex couples | No |
| LGBT people allowed to serve openly in the military | Yes (Since 2022) |
| Right to change legal gender | No |
| Access to IVF for lesbians | Yes |
| Commercial surrogacy for gay male couples | No |
| MSMs allowed to donate blood | No |

== See also ==
- Politics of Barbados
- LGBT rights in the Commonwealth of Nations
- LGBT rights in the Americas
- LGBT rights by country or territory
