= 2011 St. John by-election =

Parliamentary by-election in Barbados in 2011

- 20 January 2011
- Turnout: 61.2%

Candidate	Mara Thompson	Hudson Griffith
Party	DLP	BLP
Popular vote	4,613	553
Percentage	89.30%	10.70%
MP before election
David Thompson
DLP
Elected MP
Mara Thompson
DLP

A by-election was held in the Barbadian constituency of the St. John on 20 January 2011 after the death of the sixth prime minister of Barbados David Thompson. He was a Democratic Labour Party member and the representative of the constituency in the House of Assembly of Barbados.

== Previous election ==
2008 general election: Saint John
Candidate	Party	Votes	%
David Thompson	Democratic Labour Party	4,300	83.84
Tyronne Power	Barbados Labour Party	829	16.16
Total		5,129	100.00
Valid votes		5,129	99.59
Invalid/blank votes		21	0.41
Total votes		5,150	100.00
Registered voters/turnout		8,100	63.58
Source: Electoral and Boundaries Commission

== Results ==
Mara Thompson, wife of the late Prime Minister David Thompson, won the election in a landslide victory. Turnout was 61.2%.

Candidate	Party	Votes	%
Mara Thompson	Democratic Labour Party	4,613	89.30
Hudson Griffith	Barbados Labour Party	553	10.70
Total		5,166	100.00
Valid votes		5,166	99.69
Invalid/blank votes		16	0.31
Total votes		5,182	100.00
Registered voters/turnout		8,464	61.22
DLP hold			
Source: Caribbean Elections, Electoral and Boundaries Commission

== See also ==
- 2008 Barbadian general election
- List of parliamentary constituencies of Barbados
- List of heads of state and government who died in office
