= Christ Church East Central (Barbados Parliament constituency) =

Parliamentary constituency in Barbados

Christ Church East Central is a constituency in the Christ Church area of Barbados. Since 2018, it has been represented in the House of Assembly of the Barbadian Parliament by Ryan Straughn. Straughn is a member of the BLP. (Note: As with all constituencies, the constituency elects one Member of Parliament (MP) by the first past the post system of election at least every five years.)

Since its founding in 1981, Christ Church East Central has been a marginal constituency between the BLP and the DLP.

== Boundaries ==
The constituency boundary begins at the junction of the ABC Highway and Highway R (Upton–Kent Road), proceeding south and then east to Highway 6. It continues east along Highway 6 to its junction with Bannatyne–Kingsland Road, then follows that road south to Kingsland–Gall Hill Road. From there, it runs southeast along Kingsland–Gall Hill Road to Water Street, then east along Water Street to Highway T (Lodge Road–Oistins Hill Road).

The boundary then extends south along Highway T to Church Hill Road, east along Church Hill Road to Windy Ridge Road, and southeast along Windy Ridge Road to Highway 7 (Airport–Oistins Road) at Thornbury Hill. It continues northeast along Highway 7 to Highway S (Providence–Balls Road), then north along Highway S to the ABC Highway. From there, it runs southwest along the ABC Highway to Highway 6 (Balls–St Patrick Road) at the Henry Forde Roundabout, and then east along Highway 6 to Highway Q (Balls–Lower Greys Road).

The boundary proceeds northeast along Highway Q to Highway R (Pilgrim Place–St. Davids Road), then follows Highway R to an unclassified road west of Edeys Village leading to Small Ridge and Bannatyne Gardens. It continues along this road in a generally south, east, and then south direction until it meets Bannatyne Gardens Road. From there, it runs southwest along Bannatyne Gardens Road to Highway V (Bannatyne–St Davids Road), then northwest along Highway V to Highway R, and finally west along Highway R back to the ABC Highway, returning to the starting point.

== History ==
=== Members of Parliament ===
Election	Member	Party
1981	Harold Bernard St. John	BLP
1986	Robert Morris	DLP
1991	Robert Morris	DLP
1994	Duncan Carter	BLP
1999	Duncan Carter	BLP
2003	Ronald D. Jones	DLP
2008	Ronald D. Jones	DLP
2013	Ronald D. Jones	DLP
2018	Ryan Straughn	BLP
2022	Ryan Straughn	BLP
2026	Ryan Straughn	BLP
