= Mara Thompson =

Barbadian politician

Mara Thompson MP

Member of Parliament for Saint John
- In office 20 January 2011 – 25 May 2018
- Preceded by: David Thompson
- Succeeded by: Charles Griffith

Spouse of the Prime Minister of Barbados
- In office 16 January 2008 – 23 October 2010
- Preceded by: Julie Arthur

Personal details
- Born: 4 October 1961 (age 64) Saint Lucia
- Party: Democratic Labour Party (2008-2018)
- Spouse: David Thompson (m. 1991; died 2010)
- Children: 3
- Profession: Paralegal, physical education teacher

Marie-Josephine Mara Thompson (born 4 October 1961) is a Saint Lucian-born Barbadian politician, educator and widow of the sixth Prime Minister of Barbados, David Thompson, who died in office on 23 October 2010. After being chosen as the most favored candidate. Thompson won the special by-election to succeed her husband in the Saint John constituency on Thursday, 20 January 2011, holding the seat for the Democratic Labour Party.

== Early life and education ==
Thompson was born Marie-Josephine Mara Giraudy in Saint Lucia on 4 October 1961 to Monica and Henry Giraudy. Her father, Henry Giraudy Q.C., was a prominent Saint Lucian lawyer and politician, who was nicknamed "The Chairman" due to his high position within the United Workers Party (UWP). Henry Giraudy served as the President of the Senate of St. Lucia at one point.

Thompson attended school at St Joseph’s Convent in Castries, Saint Lucia. She was a student at the University of Western Ontario from 1979 to 1983, where she received her Bachelor of Arts in physical education. She then enrolled at Howard University in Washington D.C. from 1986 to 1988, and obtained a Master of Science in physical education. Thompson also hold a certificate in paralegal education from Barbados Community College, which she attended from 2005 to 2007.

== Career ==
Mara Thompson taught physical education at schools throughout the Caribbean and the United States between 1986 and 2005. She served on the faculties of the Owl School in Washington D.C.; the Immaculate Conception High and Prep Schools located in Kingston, Jamaica; Castries Comprehensive Secondary School in Saint Lucia; the Christ Church Foundation School and the Combermere School, both in Barbados. She worked as a paralegal at her husband's law firm, Thompson & Associates, after receiving her paralegal certificate in 2007.

=== 2011 election ===
David Thompson, the Chairman of the Democratic Labour Party, became the Prime Minister of Barbados on 16 January 2008, after winning the 2008 Barbadian general election, succeeding Owen Arthur. He died in office of pancreatic cancer on 23 October 2010, at the family's home in Mapps, St Philip.

In early January 2011, Mara Thompson confirmed her intent to contest the special election called to fill the seat of her late husband in the Saint John constituency. David Thompson had held since the Saint John seat from 1987 to 2010, succeeding the late Prime Minister Errol Barrow, who also died in office. The Saint John is considered to be a stronghold for Thompson's Democratic Labour Party (DLP). Thompson's candidacy won the official endorsement of the DLP at a meeting held on 2 January 2011. Thompson won 60 of the DLP's 69 votes, defeating several potential DLP candidates, who included Leroy McClean, Anthony Walrond, Vere Brathwaite, David Gittens and Peter David. Thompson made her first political speech as a candidate on 6 January 2011, in the village of Gall Hill, Christ Church parish.

Her main opponent in the election was businessman Hudson Griffith of the Barbados Labour Party (BLP). Owen Arthur, the former Prime Minister and leader of the opposition and Barbados Labour Party attempted to make Thompson's Saint Lucian origins an issue in the election. Arthur was criticized for the move by Barbadian Prime Minister Freundel Stuart, Saint Lucian Prime Minister Stephenson King and Vincentian Prime Minister Ralph Gonsalves.

Mara Thompson won the special by-election on 20 January 2011, by a landslide. She defeated her opponent, Hudson Griffith, by a large margin of 4,613 votes to Griffith's 553 votes in the election. Thompson won all 23 of the election ballot boxes in the Saint John constituency. She performed better than David Thompson did in the 2008 general election, when he secured approximately 4,300 votes in the constituency.

== Personal life ==
Mara and her husband, the late David Thompson, had three daughters - Misha, Oya and Osa-Marie. Thompson and her family reside in Mapps, St. Philip.

Parliament of Barbados
Preceded by David Thompson	Member of Parliament for Saint John; 2011 – 2018	Succeeded by Charles Griffith
