= Saint John (Barbados Parliament constituency) =

- Constituency for the House of Assembly of Barbados
- Region: Saint John, Barbados

Current constituency
- Created: 1645

Saint John is a constituency in the Saint John parish of Barbados. It was established in 1645 as one of the original eleven constituencies. Originally the constituency, like the other original ten, was represented by 2 members until 1971 when the single-member system was introduced. Since 2018, it has been represented in the House of Assembly of the Barbadian Parliament by Charles McDonald Griffith. Griffith is a member of the BLP. (Note: As with all constituencies, the constituency elects one member of parliament (MP) by the first past the post system of election at least every five years.)

Since the 1961 Barbadian general election, Saint John had been considered an electoral strong hold of the DLP until 2018 where the constituency elected its first non-DLP member in several decades.

== Boundaries ==
The constituency runs:

From a point on the entrance to the sea coast at Three Boys Rock in a straight line through the triangulation station S.38 to point in the center of the road called Highway F, opposite to a monument (B.11) placed on the northern side of the road; thence in a westerly direction along the middle of Highway F to a point on the road opposite to a monument (B.10) placed at the end of an unclassified road at Foster Hall; thence in a south westerly direction to another monument (B.9) placed near the edge of Hackleton’s Cliff; thence in a south westerly direction along an unclassified road to its junction with Malvern-Venture-Road; thence in a southerly direction along the middle of the Malvern-Venture-Mt. Tabor Road to its junction with the Mt. Tabor-Claybury Road; thence in a westerly direction along the middle of Mt. Tabor-Claybury Road to its junction with the Claybury-Uplands Road; thence in a south easterly and then in a southerly direction along the Claybury-Uplands Road to its junction with Highway 3B (the Golden Ridge-Pool Road); thence in an easterly direction along Highway 3B to its junction with the road leading to Belle Farm; thence in a southerly and then easterly direction along the entrance to Belle Farm to its junction with the Ellesmere-Todds Road; thence in an easterly direction along the Ellesmere-Todds Road to its junction with the Four Roads-Woodland Road; thence in a southerly, easterly and then southerly direction along the Four Roads-Woodland Road to its junction with Highway 4 (Woodland-Kendal Road); thence in an easterly direction along the middle of Highway 4 to the centre of the culvert over the gully; thence in a southerly and south easterly direction along this gully to a point which is marked by a monument (B.12); thence proceeding north eastwards along a line joining this monument to another monument (B.13) placed on the western side of the public road called Featherbed Lane, then in a north easterly direction along the line joining this point to a monument (B.14) placed at the end of the unclassified road at Hillview; then generally eastwards along the unclassified road to the unclassified public road running from St. Philip’s Church to Cliff Plantation; thence along this road in a northerly direction to its junction with a track at the point where the road turns to the west, then northwards and eastwards along this track to its junction with an unclassified road leading from Guinea Plantation Yard to Dodds Land, thence in a northerly direction along this road to its junction with a track; then in a generally easterly direction along this track to its junction at Moncrieffe with a public road leading from District “C” Police Station to Massiah Street; thence in a northerly direction along the District “C”-Massiah Street Road to its junction with a public road leading to Mt. Pleasant Plantation; thence in an easterly direction and then in a north easterly direction along this public road to its junction with the Stewart Hill Road; thence in an easterly direction along the middle of Stewart Hill Road to its junction with the Thickets-Palmers Road; thence along the middle of the Thickets-Palmers Road in a northerly direction to its junction with the Supers-College Savannah Road; thence along the middle of the Supers-College Savannah Road to a monument (B.15) located at the St. Mark’s Church driveway; thence in a straight line to a monument (B.16) near the edge of the cliff on the sea coast; thence in a northerly direction along the sea coast to the point on the coast known as Three Boys Rock (the starting point)

== History ==
=== Members of Parliament ===
The following list contains the Members of Parliament for the Saint John since the introduction of the single-member system in 1971.

Election	Member	Party
1971	Errol Barrow	Democratic Labour Party
1976	Errol Barrow	Democratic Labour Party
1981	Errol Barrow	Democratic Labour Party
1986	Errol Barrow	Democratic Labour Party
1987	David Thompson	Democratic Labour Party
1991	David Thompson	Democratic Labour Party
1994	David Thompson	Democratic Labour Party
1999	David Thompson	Democratic Labour Party
2003	David Thompson	Democratic Labour Party
2008	David Thompson	Democratic Labour Party
2011	Mara Thompson	Democratic Labour Party
2013	Mara Thompson	Democratic Labour Party
2018	Charles Griffith	Barbados Labour Party
2022	Charles Griffith	Barbados Labour Party
2026	Charles Griffith	Barbados Labour Party
