= Saint Michael North West (Barbados Parliament constituency) =

Parliamentary constituency in Barbados

- Constituency for the House of Assembly of Barbados
- Region: Saint Michael, Barbados

Current constituency
- Created: 1971

Saint Michael North West is a constituency in the Saint Michael parish of Barbados. It was established in 1971. Since 2018, it has been represented in the House of Assembly of the Barbadian Parliament by Neil Rowe, a member of the BLP. (Note: As with all constituencies, the constituency elects one member of parliament (MP) by the first past the post system of election at least every five years.) The Saint Michael North West constituency is a safe seat for the BLP.

== Boundaries ==
The constituency runs:

From a point on the western sea coast west of the junction of Spring Garden Highway with Brandons Road in a straight line to Brandons Road; thence along the middle of Brandons Road to its junction with Lower Westbury Road and Lower Deacons Road; thence in a northerly and north easterly direction along the middle of Lower Deacons Road to its junction with Goodland Cross Road; thence in a south easterly direction along the middle of Goodland Cross Road to its junction with Bridge Gap; thence in a north easterly direction along the middle of Bridge Gap to its junction with Highway 1 (Eagle Hall-Holetown Road); thence in a north westerly direction along the middle of Highway 1 to its junction with St. Stephens Hill; thence in a northerly direction along the middle of St. Stephens Hill to its junction with Cave Hill Road; thence in a westerly, south westerly and westerly direction along the middle of Cave Hill Road to its junction with University Drive; thence in a westerly and then southerly direction along the middle of University Drive to its junction with Highway 1; thence in a northerly direction along the middle of Highway 1 to its junction with Batts Rock Road; thence in a westerly direction along the middle of Batts Rock Road to its terminus; thence in a straight line to a point on the western sea coast, west of the Batts Rock Road terminus; thence in a southerly direction along the sea coast to a point on the coast west of the junction of Spring Garden Highway with Brandons Road (the starting point).

== Members ==
Election	Member	Party
1991		
1994	Lawson Weekes	DLP
1996 by-election	Clyde Mascoll	DLP
1999	Clyde Mascoll	DLP
2003	Clyde Mascoll	DLP
2006 (crossed the floor)	Clyde Mascoll	BLP
2008	Christopher Sinckler	DLP
2013		
2018	Neil Rowe	BLP
2022	Neil Rowe	BLP

== Elections ==
=== 2022 ===
St. Michael North West
Party	Candidate	Votes	%	±%
BLP	Neil Rowe	1,914	64.1	+8.5
DLP	Ryan Walters	1,072	35.9	−8.5
Majority		842	28.2	+17.1
Turnout		2,986		
BLP hold		Swing	+8.5	

=== 2018 ===
St. Michael North West
Party	Candidate	Votes	%	±%
BLP	Neil Rowe	2,489	55.6	+18.9
DLP	Christopher Sinckler	1,991	44.4	−18.9
Majority		498	11.1	−15.6
Turnout		4,480		
BLP gain from DLP		Swing	+18.9	
