= Christ Church South (Barbados Parliament constituency) =

Constituency of Barbadian Parliament

Christ Church South is a constituency in the Christ Church area of Barbados represented in the House of Assembly of the Barbadian Parliament since 2026 by Shantal Munro-Knight from the Barbados Labour Party. It was previously held since 2018 by Ralph Thorne, MP of the DLP after he crossed the floor from the Barbados Labour Party in February 2024. (Note: As with all constituencies, the constituency elects one member of parliament (MP) by the first past the post system of election at least every five years.)

Since its founding in 1991 it has mostly been held by the BLP.

== Boundaries ==
From a point on the sea coast south of the terminus of the School Hill-St. Christopher Road in a straight line to the terminus of the School Hill-St. Christopher Road; thence in a northerly direction along the middle of the School Hill-St. Christopher Road to its junction with the Sayes Court-Hopewell Road; thence in a westerly direction along the middle of the Sayes Court-Hopewell Road to its junction at the roundabout with Highway U (the Hopewell-Chancery Lane Road); thence in a westerly direction along the middle of Highway U to its junction with Waverley Road; thence in a northerly direction along the middle of Waverley Road to its junction with Pegwell Boggs Road; thence in an easterly direction along the middle of Pegwell Boggs Road to its junction with Pegwell Boggs New Road; thence in a northerly direction along the middle of Pegwell Boggs New Road to its junction with Gibbons Road; thence in a westerly direction along the middle of Gibbons Road to its junction with Highway 7 (the Oistins-Airport Road); thence in a south westerly direction along the middle of Highway 7 to its junction with Church Hill Road; thence in a westerly direction along the middle of Church Hill Road to its junction at the top of Oistins Hill with Cane Vale Road-Maxwell Hill; thence in a westerly direction along the middle of Cane Vale-Maxwell Hill to its junction with the Maxwell Hill-Graeme Hall Terrace Road; thence in a north westerly direction along the middle of the Maxwell Hill-Graeme Hall Terrace Road to its junction with the Errol Barrow Highway opposite the Ministry of Agriculture Building; thence in a northerly and then westerly direction along the middle of the Errol Barrow Highway to the eastern boundary of the Rendezvous Ridge development; thence in a southerly direction along that boundary to the base of the Rendezvous Ridge; thence in a westerly direction along the base of the Rendezvous Ridge to its junction with the Rendezvous Hill Road; thence in a southerly direction along the middle of the Rendezvous Hill Road to its junction with Highway 7; thence in a straight line to a point on the southern sea coast south of the junction of the Rendezvous Hill Road with Highway 7; thence in an easterly direction along the sea coast to a point on the coast south of the terminus of the School Hill-St. Christopher Road (the starting point).

== History ==
=== Members of Parliament ===
Election	Member	Party
1991	Harold Bernard St. John	BLP
1994	Harold Bernard St. John	BLP
1999	Harold Bernard St. John	BLP
2003	Jerome Walcott	BLP
2008	John Boyce	DLP
2013	John Boyce	DLP
2018	Ralph Thorne	BLP
2022	Ralph Thorne	BLP
2024	Ralph Thorne	DLP (Note: Thorne left the BLP and joined the DLP in 2024.)
2026	Shantal Munro-Knight	BLP
