= 1996 St. Michael North West by-election =

Parliamentary by-election in Barbados in 1996

- 4 December 1996
- Turnout: 53.6%
Candidate	Clyde Mascoll	Mark Williams
Party	DLP	BLP
Popular vote	2,014	1,593
Percentage	55.84%	44.16%

A by-election was held in the Barbadian constituency of the St. Michael North West on 4 December 1996 after the resignation of Democratic Labour Party member Lawson Weekes who was the representative of the constituency in the House of Assembly of Barbados. It was the last Barbadian by-election to take place in the 20th century.

== Previous election ==
1994 general election: Saint Michael North West
Candidate	Party	Votes	%
Lawson Weekes	Democratic Labour Party	1,683	46.69
Carlisle Best	Barbados Labour Party	1,517	42.08
Orville Applewhaite	National Democratic Party	344	9.54
Sally Cools	Independent	61	1.69
Total		3,605	100.00
Valid votes		3,605	99.37
Invalid/blank votes		23	0.63
Total votes		3,628	100.00
Registered voters/turnout		6,634	54.69
Source: Caribbean Elections, Barbados Electoral and Boundaries Commission

== Results ==
Clyde Mascoll won the election. Turnout was 53.6%

Candidate	Party	Votes	%
Clyde Mascoll	Democratic Labour Party	2,014	55.84
Mark Williams	Barbados Labour Party	1,593	44.16
Total		3,607	100.00
Valid votes		3,607	99.39
Invalid/blank votes		22	0.61
Total votes		3,629	100.00
Registered voters/turnout		6,763	53.66
DLP hold			
Source: Caribbean Elections, Barbados Electoral and Boundaries Commission

== See also ==
- 1994 Barbadian general election
- List of parliamentary constituencies of Barbados
