= 1987 St. John by-election =

Parliamentary by-election in Barbados in 1987

- 16 July 1987
- Turnout: 73.8%
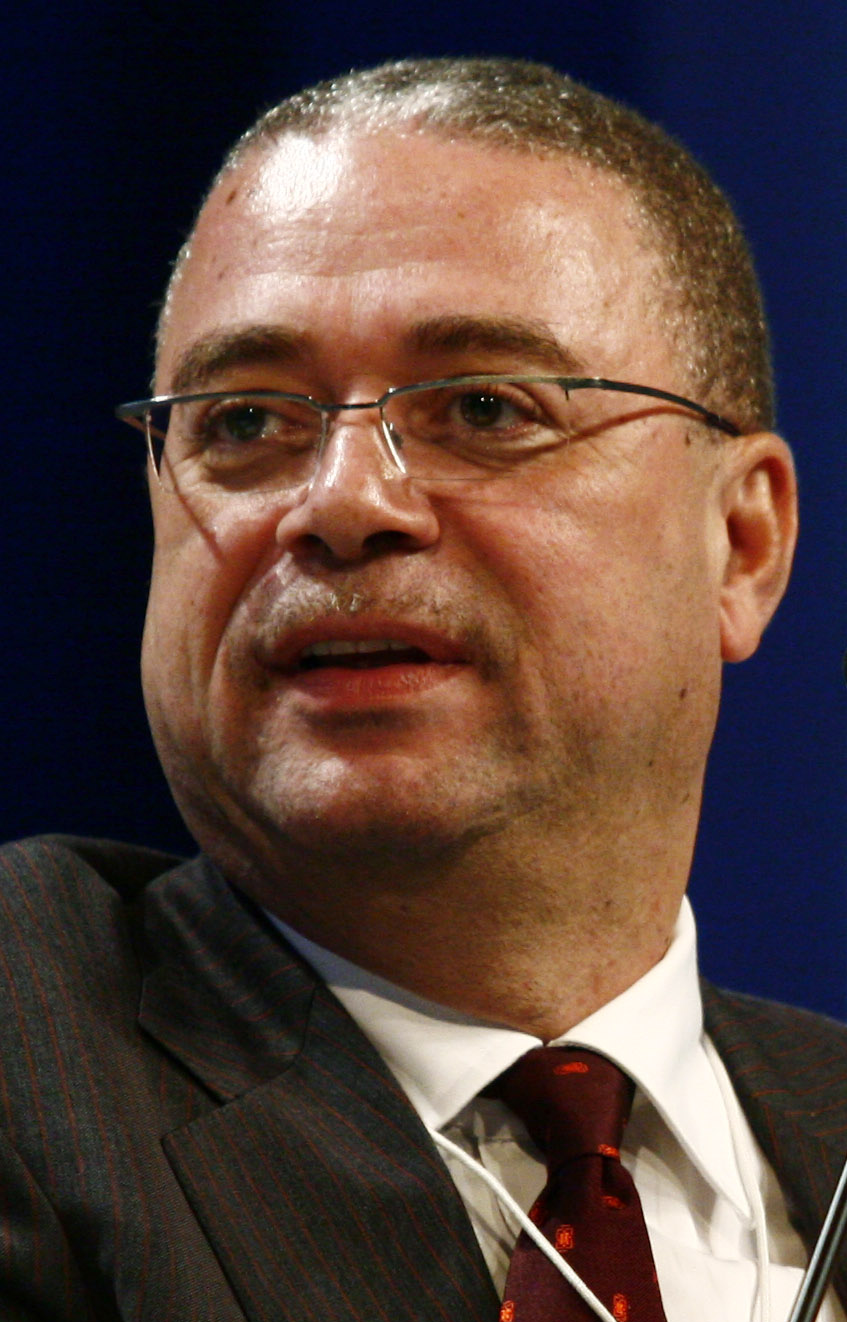

Candidate	David Thompson	Hutson Linton
Party	DLP	BLP
Popular vote	4,108	544
Percentage	86.39%	11.44%
MP before election
Errol Barrow
DLP
Elected MP
David Thompson
DLP

A by-election was held in the Barbadian constituency of the St. John on 16 July 1987 after the death of the first prime minister of Barbados Errol Barrow. He was a Democratic Labour Party member and the representative of the constituency in the House of Assembly of Barbados.

== Previous election ==
1986 general election: Saint John
Candidate	Party	Votes	%
Errol Barrow	Democratic Labour Party	3,957	86.42
John Nichols	Barbados Labour Party	583	12.73
Evan Webster	Independent	39	0.85
Total		4,579	100.00
Valid votes		4,540	99.50
Invalid/blank votes		23	0.50
Total votes		4,563	100.00
Registered voters/turnout		6,231	73.23
Source: Caribbean Elections, Barbados Electoral and Boundaries Commission

== Results ==
David Thompson won the election in a landslide victory. Turnout was 73.8%.

Candidate	Party	Votes	%
David Thompson	Democratic Labour Party	4,108	86.39
Hutson Linton	Barbados Labour Party	544	11.44
Ramses Caddle	Independent	69	1.45
Evan Webster	Independent	34	0.72
Total		4,755	100.00
Valid votes		4,755	99.79
Invalid/blank votes		10	0.21
Total votes		4,765	100.00
Registered voters/turnout		6,453	73.84
DLP hold			
Source: Caribbean Elections, Barbados Electoral and Boundaries Commission

== See also ==
- 1986 Barbadian general election
- List of parliamentary constituencies of Barbados
- List of heads of state and government who died in office
