= Alphea =

Alphea may refer to:

- HMS Alphea (1806)
- Alphea Wiggins

== See also ==
- Alpheaea
