= People's Empowerment Party (Barbados) =

- Leader: David Comissiong
- Founded: 14 January 2006
- Ideology: Democratic socialism Socialism of the 21st Century; Republicanism
- Political position: Left-wing
- Regional affiliation: São Paulo Forum
- Colours
- House of Assembly of Barbados: 0 / 30

The People's Empowerment Party (PEP) is a left-wing political party in Barbados. The party was established on 14 January 2006 as the electoral wing of the Clement Payne Movement. Led by David Comissiong, it received only 198 votes in the 2008 elections and failed to win a seat.
