= Ralph Thorne =

Barbadian politician

Ralph Thorne KC
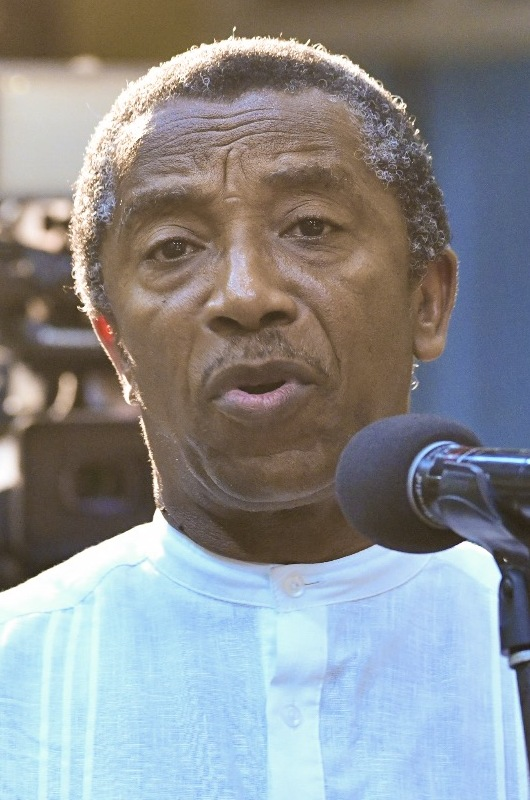

Leader of the Opposition
- In office 12 February 2024 – 11 February 2026
- Prime Minister: Mia Mottley
- Preceded by: Joseph Atherley (2022)
- Succeeded by: Vacant

Leader of the Democratic Labour Party
- In office 19 February 2024 – 11 February 2026
- Preceded by: Ronnie Yearwood
- Succeeded by: Vacant

Member of the House of Assembly of Barbados for Christ Church South
- In office 24 May 2018 – 11 February 2026
- Prime Minister: Mia Mottley
- Preceded by: John D. E. Boyce
- Succeeded by: Shantal Munro-Knight

Personal details
- Party: Democratic Labour (since 2024)
- Other political affiliations: Labour (until 2024)
- Spouse: Jacqueline Cornelius
- Children: 3

Ralph Thorne is a Barbadian lawyer and politician who served as Leader of the Opposition in the House of Assembly of Barbados as a member of the Democratic Labour Party from 2024 to 2026. He served the House of Assembly for Christ Church South from 2018 to 2026.

== Early life and education ==
Ralph Thorne attended Grace Hill Primary School.

== Career ==
=== Legal ===
Throne was a Queen's Counsel and was the lead defence attorney for Michael Misick in his corruption trial. He operates his own law firm. Neil Rowe, a member of the Parliament of Barbados who was accused of rape, was defended by Thorne and found not guilty in 2025.

=== Politics ===
Thorne was initially a member of the Democratic Labour Party (DLP) and ran for parliament with their nomination twice, but left to join the Barbados Labour Party (BLP). In the 2018 election, in which the BLP won every seat, Thorne was elected to the House of Assembly of Barbados for Christ Church South as a member of the BLP.

The BLP won every seat again in the 2022 election. Thorne crossed the floor and became leader of the opposition. He rejoined the DLP and was selected to be its leader. Thorne appointed Ryan Walters and Tricia Watson, both members of the DLP, to the seats reserved for the opposition in the Senate of Barbados before he rejoined the DLP himself.

During Thorne's tenure in parliament he chaired the Thorne Commission on Local Government which was charged with establishing People’s Assemblies, a form of local government.

Thorne ran in the 2026 Barbadian general election for the constituency of St. John, but lost to the Barbados Labour Party candidate Charles Griffith. After securing no seats in the election, Thorne resigned as leader of the Democratic Labour Party on 12 February 2026.

== Personal life ==
Thorne married Jacqueline Cornelius, with whom he has three children. Jacqueline is a High Court judge.

== Works cited ==
=== News ===
- "DLP confirms Ralph Thorne as political leader and new member". Barbados Today. 19 February 2024. Archived from the original on 24 June 2025.
- "DLP: Thorne doesn't speak for us". Barbados Today. 14 February 2024. Archived from the original on 24 June 2025.
- "Former deputy speaker in Barbados found not guilty of rape". The Gleaner. 7 May 2025. Archived from the original on 24 June 2025.
- "More 'power to the people' with Thorne Commission". Barbados Today. 11 July 2019. Archived from the original on 24 June 2025.
- "Ralph Thorne: Prepared to serve". The Nation Barbados. 23 April 2018. Archived from the original on 24 June 2025.
- Blunt, Shamar (14 February 2024). "DLP: Thorne doesn't speak for us". Barbados Today. Archived from the original on 24 June 2025.
- Blunt, Shamar (10 February 2024). "Political scientist not surprised by Ralph Thorne's move to opposition". Barbados Today. Archived from the original on 24 June 2025.
- Boyce, Hayden (18 June 2018). "Ralph Thorne, former lead lawyer for Mike Missick elected to Barbados Parliament". Turks and Caicos Sun. Archived from the original on 24 June 2025.
- Clarke, Sherrylyn (10 February 2024). "Ralph Thorne crosses the floor and is new Opposition Leader". The Nation Barbados. Archived from the original on 24 June 2025.
- Wedderburn, Fernella (7 September 2023). "MP's rape case committed for trial before judge and jury". Barbados Today. Archived from the original on 24 June 2025.

=== Web ===
- "Member Details". Parliament of Barbados. Archived from the original on 27 April 2025.

Party political offices
Preceded by Ronnie Yearwood	Leader of the Democratic Labour Party; 2024-present	Succeeded by Incumbent
