= Combating Human Trafficking Act, 2021 =

Ontario, Canada statute

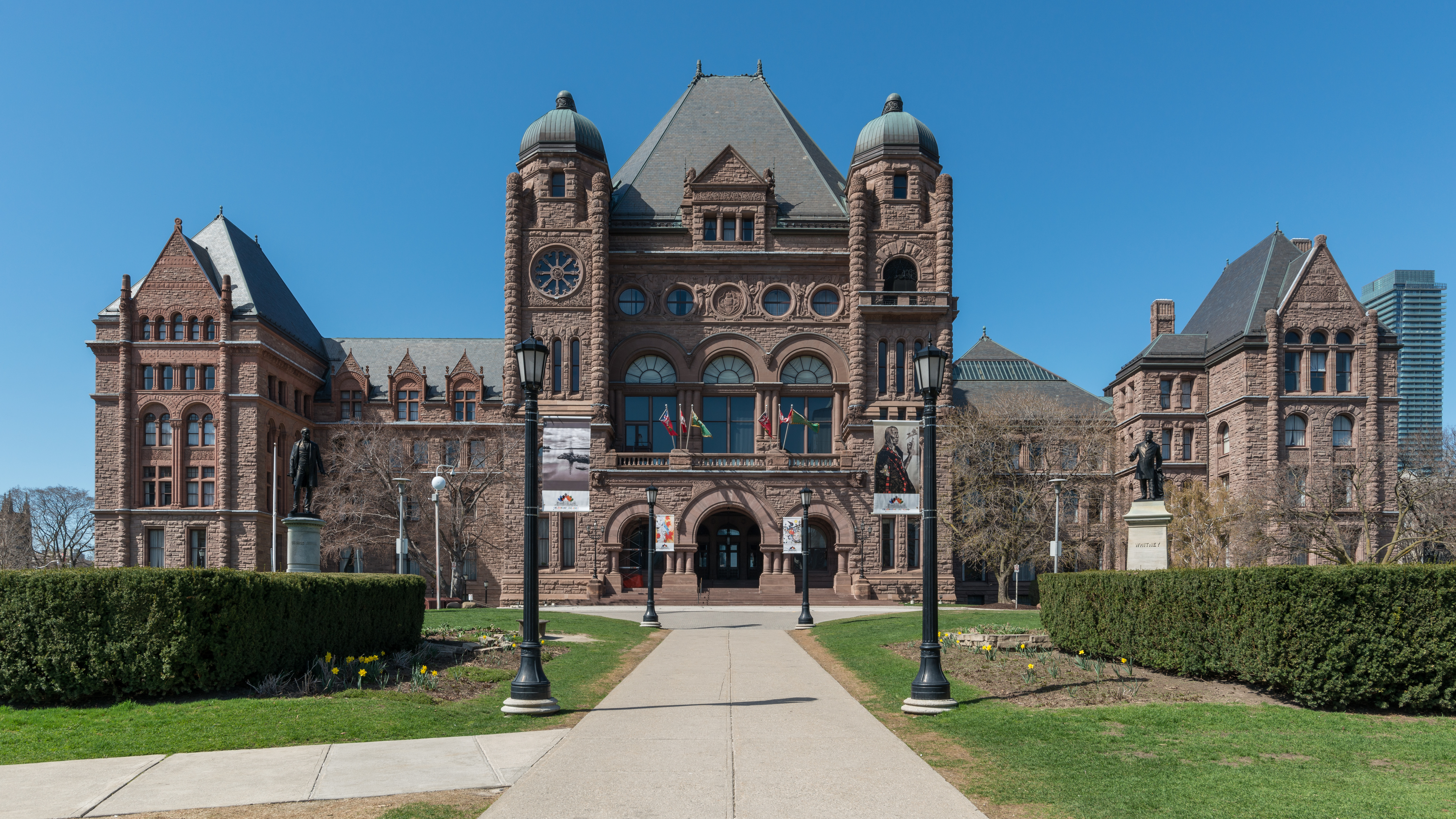

Legislative Assembly of Ontario
- Long title: An Act to enact, amend and repeal various Acts in respect of human trafficking matters
- Citation: S.O. 2021, c. 21
- Royal assent: 3 June 2021

Legislative history
- Bill citation: Bill 251
- Introduced by: Sylvia Jones, Solicitor General
- First reading: 22 February 2021
- Second reading: 6 May 2021
- Third reading: 31 May 2021
- Status: Current legislation

The Combating Human Trafficking Act, 2021 (Bill 251, 2021; French: Loi de 2021 sur la lutte contre la traite des personnes) is a law in the province of Ontario that aims to fight human trafficking in the province.

== Background ==
In March 2020, the government of Ontario had announced a $202 million increase in funding for anti-human trafficking strategies in the province.

== Summary ==
The Act contains four schedules, the Accommodation Sector Registration of Guests Act, 2021, the Anti-Human Trafficking Strategy Act, 2021, amendments to the Child, Youth and Family Services Act, 2017, and amendments to the Prevention of and Remedies for Human Trafficking Act, 2017.

Schedule 1 would repeal the Hotel Registration of Guests Act, replacing it with the Accommodation Sector Registration of Guests Act, 2021, introducing stricter regulations on the maintenance of hotel guest registries, including establish a minimum length of time that registries must be maintained and allowing police to obtain guest registries without a court order in certain situations. It would also update the legal definition of a hotel and would remove the requirement for hotels to post room rates.

Schedule 2, the Anti-Human Trafficking Strategy Act, 2021, would require the government to maintain a regularly updated anti-human trafficking strategy and to create a regulation-making authority tasked with fighting human trafficking in Ontario. That authority would be given powers including the dissemination of information about human trafficking, collection of data on suspected instances of human trafficking, requiring entities that advertise sexual services to have public contact information, and imposing fines for violations of anti-human trafficking measures.

Schedule 3 would amend the Child, Youth and Family Services Act, 2017 to give child protection workers and peace officers authorisation to remove 16- and 17-year-old victims of child sex trafficking to new locations, would clarify the role of children's aid societies to intervene in cases where children would be at risk, and would increase penalties for interfering with children in the care of a children's aid society.

Schedule 4 would amend the Prevention of and Remedies for Human Trafficking Act, 2017 to give judges the powers to lengthen restraining orders beyond the previous limit of three years, allow restraining orders to include provisions intended to protect others (and not just the immediate victim), and would modify the guidelines on who can apply for a restraining order on behalf of a child.

== Legislative history ==
The bill was introduced to the Legislative Assembly by Sylvia Jones, Progressive Conservative MPP for Dufferin—Caledon and Solicitor General of Ontario, in late February 2021. It passing second and third reading in May 2021, and received royal assent on June 3.

== Reactions ==
The Ontario Association of Children’s Aids Societies announced their support for the bill, stating that it was "a step forward for raising awareness."

The bill received criticism from some human rights advocates, who argued that vulnerable sex workers would face heavily increased police surveillance and abuse. The HIV Legal Network and Butterfly (Asian Migrant Sex Workers Support Network) released a joint statement opposing the bill, co-signed by over 60 human rights groups in Ontario, stating that it conflated human trafficking with sex work and relied on ineffective policing strategies instead of human rights-based anti-trafficking strategies.

The bill was also criticised as being disproportionately targeted towards racialised communities, especially as bill came in a period when police violence towards marginalised communities was being heavily debated. Academic Robyn Maynard stated that "we know that police are not a source of safety for Black women even when they need support" and argued that "Bill 251 further endangers Black, Asian and sex working communities because it expands the power, scope and funding for the policing of our communities under the guise of protection."
