= Ro-Ann Mohammed =

LGBTQ rights activist in Barbados

Ro-Ann Mohammed is a human rights activist. In 2012, she co-founded the organisation Barbados - Gays, Lesbians and All-Sexuals against Discrimination (B-GLAD) with Donnya Piggott. In 2018, she was an organizer of Barbados' first LGBTQ Pride Parade.

== Early life ==
Ro-Ann was born and raised in Trinidad and Tobago. She moved to Barbados to attend The University of the West Indies Cave Hill and studied psychology.

== Career ==
In 2012, she started B-GLAD with Donnya Piggott. She has been vocal about the discrimination that LGBTQ people face in Barbados. and that the Evangelical Church in Barbados discriminates against LGBTQ people.

She is a feminist, advocate for gender equality and activist for sexual and reproductive health rights. In 2016, she was named as a Fellow in President Obama's Young Leader of the Americas Initiative (YLAI) for her work with the Barbados LGBTQ community.

She speaks out against the Barbados government, which punishes gay sex with life imprisonment. She attended anti-LGBTQ spaces in protest. In 2018, Mohammed was responsible for organizing Barbados' first LGBTQ Pride Parade, which took place in the island's capital of Bridgetown.
