= Workers Party of Barbados =

- Leader: George Belle
- Founded: 1 May 1985
- Ideology: Marxism; Democratic centralism Progressivism
- Political position: Left-wing

The Workers Party of Barbados was a Marxist political party in Barbados. The party was established on 1 May 1985 by Dr. George Belle, who served as the general secretary of the party. The party had a pro-Soviet orientation and grew out of MONALI, an earlier Marxist movement based at the Cave Hill University of the West Indies campus which had gained national notoriety during the 1983 Grenada invasion. When announcing the transformation of MONALI into the Workers Party of Barbados, Belle affirmed the party would be organized along the lines of democratic centralism and would work on a basis of a programme of "progressive reforms and revolutionary democratic demands". The founders of the party included trade unionist Ricky Parry.

The party contested the 1986 elections, when it presented two candidates. The party received just 40 votes, failed to win a seat, and did not run in any further elections.

WPB called for a boycott of the 1986 Commonwealth Games, in protest against Margaret Thatcher's support for participation of South African athletes. Barbados later joined the boycott of the event.

== Electoral history ==
Election	Party leader	Votes	%	Seats	+/–	Position	Outcome
1986	George Belle	40	0.03	0 / 27	0	▲3rd	Extra-parliamentary
