= Freundel Stuart =

Prime Minister of Barbados from 2010 to 2018

The Right Honourable Freundel Stuart OR PC SC
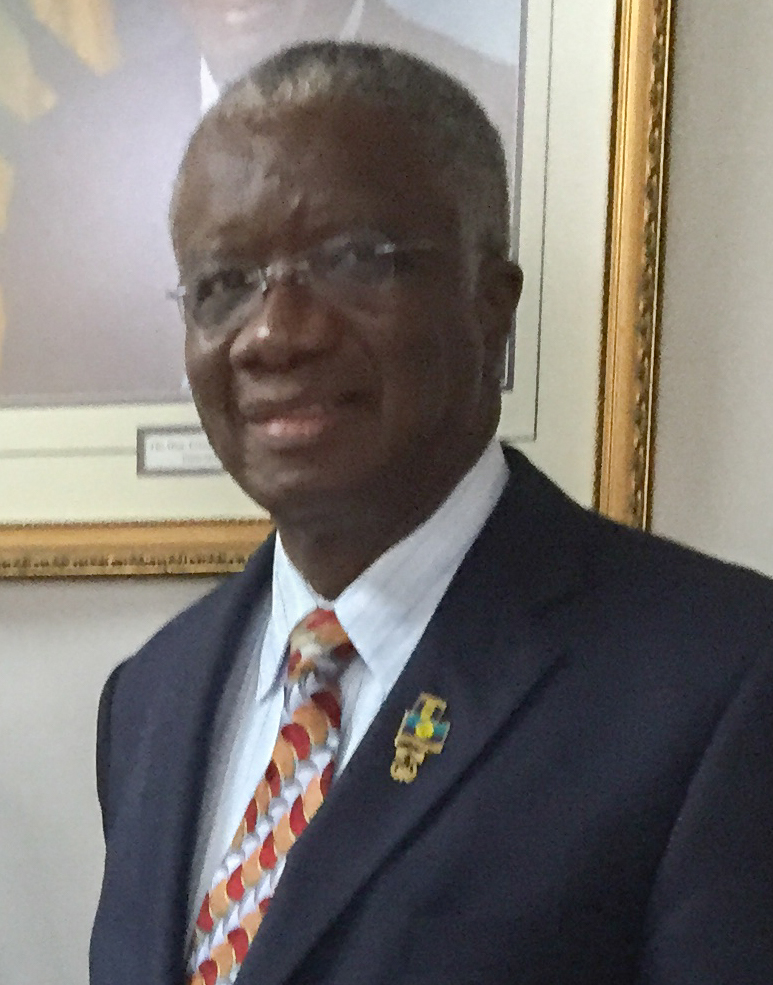
- Stuart in 2016

7th Prime Minister of Barbados
- In office 23 October 2010 – 25 May 2018
- Monarch: Elizabeth II
- Governors-General: Clifford Husbands; Elliott Belgrave; Sandra Mason
- Preceded by: David Thompson
- Succeeded by: Mia Mottley

8th Deputy Prime Minister of Barbados
- In office 20 January 2008 – 23 October 2010
- Prime Minister: David Thompson
- Preceded by: Mia Mottley
- Succeeded by: Santia Bradshaw (2022)

Leader of the Democratic Labour Party
- In office 23 October 2010 – 12 August 2018
- Preceded by: David Thompson
- Succeeded by: Verla De Peiza

Personal details
- Born: 27 April 1951 (age 75) Saint Philip, British Windward Islands (present day Barbados)
- Party: Democratic Labour Party
- Education: University of the West Indies at Cave Hill

Freundel Jerome Stuart, OR, PC, SC (born 27 April 1951) is a Barbadian politician who served as Prime Minister of Barbados and the leader of the Democratic Labour Party (DLP) from 2010 to 2018. He succeeded David Thompson, who died in office from pancreatic cancer.

== Personal life and education ==
Stuart was born in Saint Philip, Barbados. He is the father of one daughter.

An alumnus of the Christ Church Foundation School, Stuart is a graduate of the University of the West Indies at Cave Hill and holds degrees in Political Science and Law. He is a lawyer and his practice encompasses criminal and corporate law.

In 1974, Stuart officially joined the Ministry of Education and became a Teacher in Princess margaret secondary (PMS).

He has supported several community organisations and sponsors the Dayrells United Achievers Community Club and the Notre Dame Sports Club.

== Political career ==
Stuart entered the Democratic Labour Party (DLP) in 1970 and served in the Senate of Barbados until 1994. He entered elective politics in 1994 and became a Member of parliament for St. Philip South until he was defeated by Barbados Labour Party representative Anthony Wood in the 1999 Barbadian general election. In 2003, Stuart switched Constituencies to St. Michael South but remained as a member of the Democratic Labour Party, he was defeated by Minister for Tourism and Transport Noel Lynch in the 2003 Barbadian general election. He contested in St. Michael South again in the 2008 Barbadian general election and defeated Noel Lynch this time. He represented the St. Michael South constituency.

Stuart was elected as 1st vice-president of the DLP and Deputy Leader of the Opposition in 1995. He served in that position until 2004.

Stuart was also appointed in 1995 as shadow deputy prime minister, shadow attorney general and shadow interior minister to serve in the Shadow Cabinet of David Thompson. He held those three positions until 20 January 2008.

In 2004, Stuart was elected as the leader and president of the DLP in a leadership election. Stuart narrowly defeated then DLP Leader Clyde Mascoll but remained as the Deputy Leader of the Opposition, while Thompson remained as Opposition Leader.

After the Democratic Labour Party won the 2008 Barbadian general election, Stuart was appointed deputy prime minister, Attorney-General of Barbados and minister of home affairs by Prime Minister David Thompson to serve in his cabinet. Stuart served in those three positions until May 2010.

== Prime Minister of Barbados ==
Stuart served as acting prime minister of Barbados from May 2010 when Prime Minister David Thompson became ill with pancreatic cancer. Adriel Brathwaite succeeded Stuart in the positions he then held, namely attorney-general and minister of home affairs. Thompson died on 23 October 2010. Leaders of the Democratic Labour Party held an emergency meeting at the party's headquarters in George Street in Bridgetown on the morning of Thompson's death, during which Stuart was chosen as the next prime minister.

Stuart was sworn in as the 7th Prime Minister of Barbados and Minister for National Security, the public service and Urban Development the same day by Governor-General Clifford Husbands.

In 2011, Stuart was appointed a member of the UN Global Panel on Sustainability.

Stuart won his first election as prime minister on 21 February 2013, defeating Barbados Labour Party challenger (for his constituency) Noel Lynch.

On 24 January 2014 Stuart became a member of the Privy Council of the United Kingdom.

Stuart had announced changes for Barbados including his intention to turn Barbados into a republic and replace the Queen of Barbados with a ceremonial president as head of state. (Note: In September 2020, his successor Mia Mottley's government also proposed removing the Queen as head of state.) Ahead of the 2018 General Election Stuart stated if re-elected he would push for removal of Barbados from jurisdiction of the Caribbean Court of Justice (CCJ).

The DLP lost all of its seats in the May 2018 election to the Barbados Labour Party of Mia Mottley. It was the worst defeat of a sitting government in Barbadian history. Stuart himself was roundly defeated in his own seat, taking only 26.7 percent of the vote.

On 1 August 2018, Stuart stepped down as DLP leader and President, and a leadership election was held to fill the position where the Candidate for Christ Church South Verla De Peiza won unopposed in the election. Verla De Peiza succeeded Stuart on the following day.

== Honours and awards ==
- Guyana:
  - Member of the Order of Roraima (O.R.)

== Notes ==
Political offices
Preceded by Mia Mottley	Deputy Prime Minister of Barbados; 2008–2010	Vacant Title next held by Santia Bradshaw
Preceded by Dale Marshall	Attorney-General of Barbados; 2008–2010	Succeeded by Adriel Brathwaite
Preceded by David Thompson	Prime Minister of Barbados; 2010–2018	Succeeded by Mia Mottley
Party political offices
Preceded by David Thompson	Leader of the Democratic Labour Party; 2010–2018	Succeeded by Verla De Peiza
