= Alexa Hoffmann =

Barbadian human rights activist (born 1993)

Alexa Hoffmann (born December 1993) is a Barbadian human rights activist. She is known for her advocacy in support of LGBTQ people in Barbados.

== Personal life ==
Hoffmann was born in December 1993 in Barbados. She recognised she was transgender from a young age, but was not supported by her religious family. In 2013, Hoffmann transitioned to living as a woman, and later legally changed her name to Alexa. As of 2018, she lives in Christ Church.

== Activism ==
Hoffman was advocated against religious and pop culture rhetoric, including murder music, which she stated had influenced prejudice against LGBTQ people in Barbados.

After coming out in 2013, Hoffmann went on to found Trans Advocacy and Agitation Barbados. The organisation has provided training for services such as the Barbados Police Service on how to work and support members of the LGBTQ community. It has also organised "flash stands" outside of the Parliament Buildings in Bridgetown, with the aim of encouraging reflective conversations about and with transgender people in Barbados.

In 2015, Hoffmann was one of the members of the first pilot committee for what would become Barbados Pride. In 2017, with the support of the Canadian HIV/AIDS Legal Network and the Canadian High Commissioner, Marie Legault, Hoffmann organised and led Barbados' first pride parade.

In June 2018, Hoffmann was the first claimant, alongside an unidentified lesbian and gay man, in a legal challenge against Barbados' colonial-era Sexual Offences Act filed before the Inter-American Commission on Human Rights. Hoffman and the other claimants were supported by the Canadian HIV/AIDS Legal Network and the University of Toronto's International Human Rights Programme. In June 2019, the Commission gave the Barbadian government three months to respond to the petition, with it escalating the case to the Inter-American Court on Human Rights if it failed to do so.

In August 2020, the Barbadian government passed the Employment (Prevention of Discrimination) Act, which prohibited employment discrimination on the basis of sex, sexual orientation, marital status and domestic partnership. Hoffmann argued the bill excluded protections for transgender people due to it omitting gender identity and gender expression.

=== 2018 meat cleaver attack ===
On 18 February 2018, Hoffmann was attacked by her former roommate with a meat cleaver after she accused him stealing her possessions. She received lacerations to her forehead, nose, upper lip, shoulder and the side of her neck. On 23 February, Brandon Coward was apprehended for the police and released on a 2000 BBD bail. He subsequently absconded and was not located by the police for a year, despite Hoffmann sharing his whereabouts with police on several occasions.

On 8 April 2019, the magistrates court in Oistins ordered Coward to pay a fine of 460 BBD or else serve three months in prison.

The attack, and the police's response to it, was criticised by Barbados-Gays, Lesbians and All-Sexuals Against Discrimination, who stated that the police had only responded to Hoffmann's complaint after the organisation made contact with them. The Latin American and Caribbean Network of Trans Activists also criticised the police's response.#

=== 2024 unfair dismissal case ===
In 2024, Hoffman brought an unfair dismissal claim against a legal firm, Court Caribbean Law Practice, where she had worked as a clerical officer, on the basis of gender discrimination after she was fired without notice after legally changing her name. It was filed after the Labour Department failed to resolve the dispute. On 12 August 2024, the case was dismissed by the Employment Rights Tribunal, which stated it could not make a ruling due to there being no laws concerning or recognising transgender people in Barbados. The ERT highlighted the need for laws to be amended to reflect an "evolving Barbadian society" and to ensure transgender people were given "freedom of choice" and "basic human dignity".
