= Neil Rowe =

Barbadian politician

Member of the House of Assembly of Barbados for Saint Michael North West
- Incumbent
- Assumed office 24 May 2018

Personal details
- Party: Barbados Labour Party

Neil G. H. Rowe is a Barbadian politician from the Barbados Labour Party (BLP).

== Political career ==
In the 2018 Barbadian general election, was elected in Saint Michael North West. He serves as Deputy Speaker of the House of Assembly.

== Legal Issues ==
Rowe was accused of raping a woman at his Kingsland, Christ Church home on September 18, 2022. He denied the allegations and went to trial, which began on April 9, 2025 and lasted until May 8, 2025 where he was found non-guilty by a jury of five women and four men. He was defended by his lawyer and then-Leader of the Opposition of Barbados Ralph Thorne.
