= Shantal Munro-Knight =

Barbadian politician

Shantal Munro-Knight MP
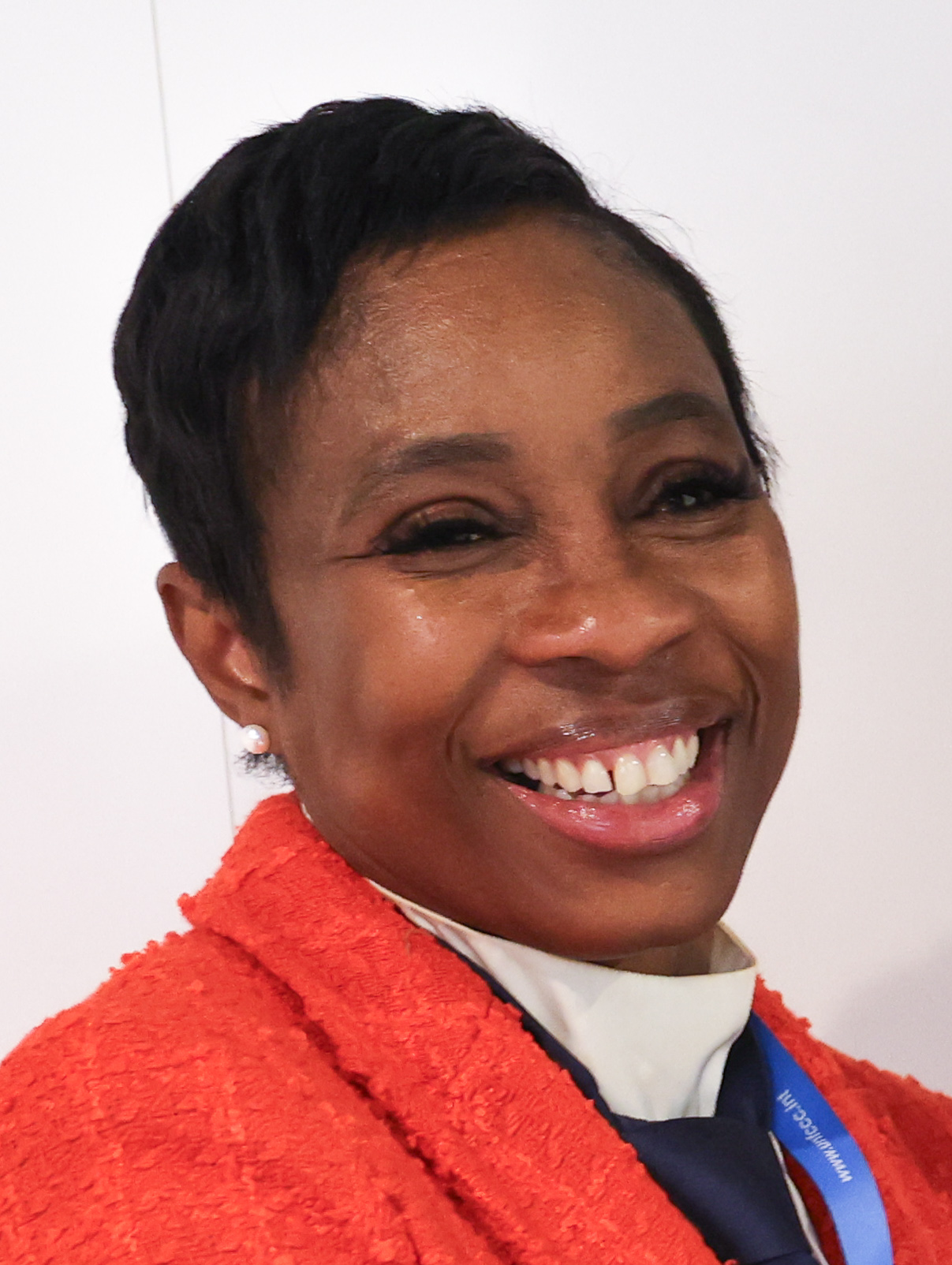

Member of the House of Assembly of Barbados for Christ Church South
- Incumbent
- Assumed office February 20, 2026
- Preceded by: Ralph Thorne

Personal details
- Party: Barbados Labour Party

Shantal Munro-Knight is a Barbadian politician from the Barbados Labour Party (BLP), currently serving in the House of Assembly of Barbados. She previously served as a Senator in the Senate of Barbados. She serves as a Minister in the Prime Minister's Office of Barbados.

Munro-Knight was the Barbados Labour Party candidate in the 2026 Barbadian general election for the constituency of Christ Church South, winning with 2,300 votes.
