= Christopher Sinckler =

Foreign Minister of Barbados

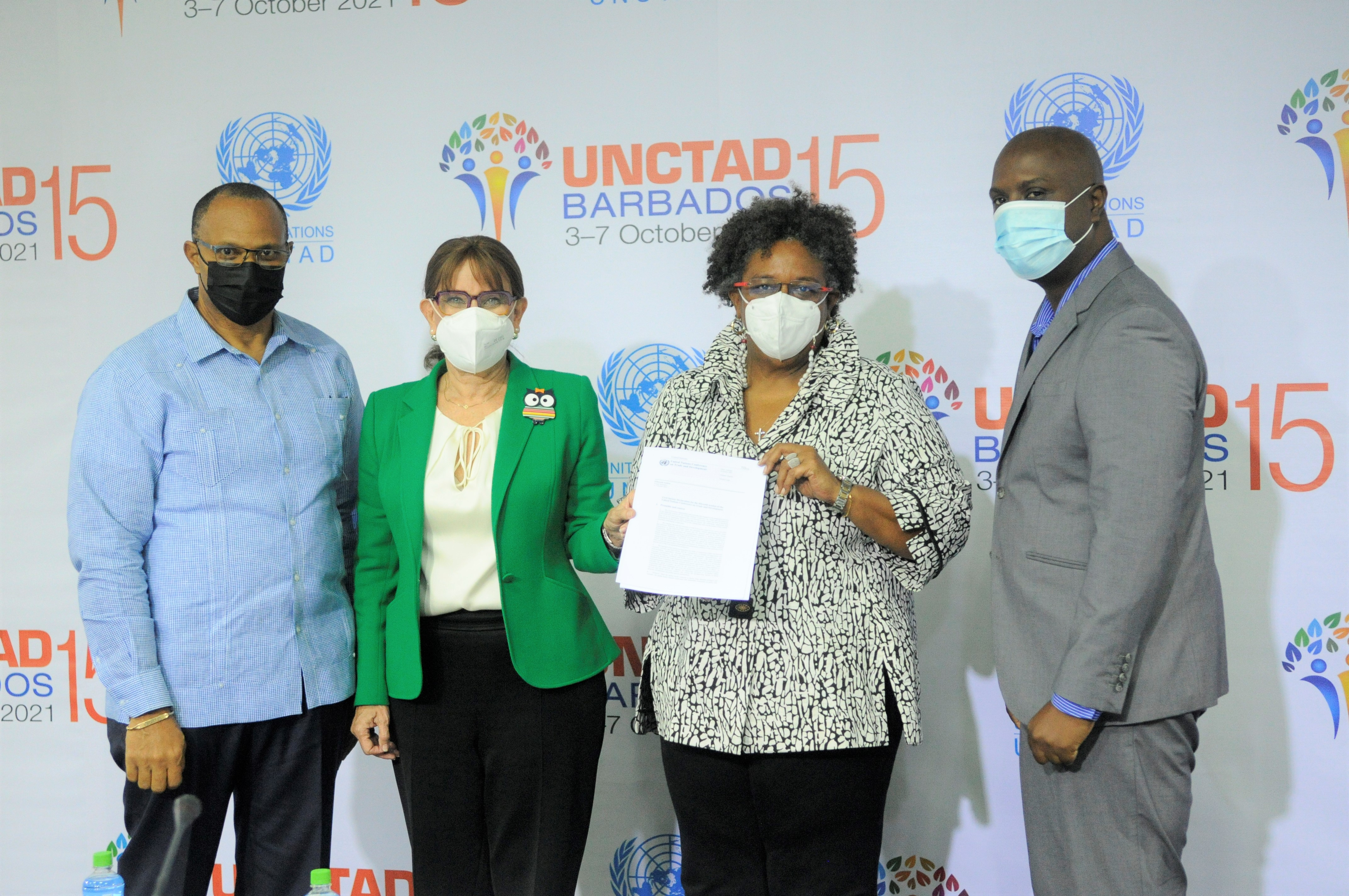
- Christopher Sinckler (on left)

Minister of Foreign Affairs, Foreign Trade and International Business
- Incumbent
- Assumed office 16 February 2026
- Preceded by: Kerrie Symmonds

Minister of Foreign Affairs
- In office 2008–2008
- Prime Minister: Owen Arthur
- Preceded by: Billie Miller
- Succeeded by: Maxine McClean

Personal details
- Born: 1967 (age 58–59) Barbados
- Party: Barbados Labour Party
- Other political affiliations: DLP (previously)

Christopher Sinckler (born 1967) is a Barbadian politician who became Minister of Foreign Affairs in 2026.

== Career ==
Sinckler represented Saint Michael North West in the House of Assembly of Barbados for the Democratic Labour Party. He served as foreign minister in 2008 under David Thompson.

After the 2026 Barbadian general election, he returned as foreign minister appointed to the Cabinet of Barbados by Mia Mottley. He was appointed a senator.

== See also ==
- List of members of the House of Assembly of Barbados
