= Duncan Carter =

Barbadian cricketer (1939–2008)

Personal information
- Born: 6 November 1939; Christ Church, Barbados
- Died: 20 August 2008 (aged 68)
- Source: Cricinfo, 13 November 2020

Duncan Carter (6 November 1939 – 20 August 2008) was a Barbadian cricketer and politician. He played in one first-class match for the Barbados cricket team in 1964/65. He also served as a member of parliament for the Parliament of Barbados from 1994 to 2003.

== Life ==
Carter was born on 6 November 1939 in Vauxhall, Christ Church. He played cricket for the Royal Barbados Police Force in the 1960s and played in England for Littleborough Cricket Club in the Central Lancashire League. He was manager of the Barbados team in 1988. He was also a former chairman of the National Sports Council.

He served in Parliament for the constituency of Christ Church East Central. He lost in the 1991 general election but won at the next election, serving from 6 September 1994 to 21 May 2003 as a representative of the Barbados Labour Party.

He married Pauline and they have two children, Desmond and Hazel. He died on 20 August 2008 in Warners Park, Christ Church.

== See also ==
- List of Barbadian representative cricketers
