= Clement Payne Movement =

- President: David A. Comissiong
- General Secretary: Bobby Clarke
- Founded: 1988
- Ideology: Pan-Africanism; Socialism
- Political position: Left-wing

The Clement Payne Movement (CPM) is a left-wing Barbados-based political party named in honour of a Trinidad-born man who led a 1937 uprising in Barbados. The Clement Payne Movement is generally seen by most Barbadians as more leftist in ideology when compared with either the more moderate Barbados Labour Party (BLP) or Democratic Labour Party (DLP).

The CPM also seeks the global advancement of Pan-Africanism, and has a strong base in this area located in Barbados. The president of the party is David A. Comissiong and the general secretary is Bobby Clarke.

In the past, on several occasions the leaders of the CPM have publicly appealed to other Caribbean governments not to officially recognize the 2004 US-imposed interim government in Haiti. The party also officially opposes the process known as the Free Trade Area of the Americas.

== History ==
The CPM was formed in 1988, when its leading figures included David Commissiong, Martin Cadogan, Leroy Harewood, Trevor Prescod, David Denny and John Howell. The organization is named after Clement Payne, a pioneer in the Caribbean trade union movement, who in 1998 was officially recognized as one of the National Heroes of Barbados. The CPM annually distributes a "Clement Payne Hero’s Award".

The CPM maintains close contacts with the Communist Party of Cuba, and supports normalised relations with the Republic of Cuba.

== See also ==
- People's Empowerment Party (CPM electoral front)
- Pan-Caribbean Congress
