= Frederick Atkins =

Barbadian murderer

- Died: 2005; Prison, Barbados
- Occupation: Bus Driver
- Known for: Convicted murderer whose case involved appeals to the Inter-American Court of Human Rights
- Criminal charge: Murder
- Criminal penalty: Death sentence (mandatory)
- Criminal status: Died in prison before the execution could be carried out

Frederick Atkins (died 2005) was a convicted murderer who received a mandatory death sentence from a court in Barbados. He died in prison while the Inter-American Court of Human Rights was considering his appeal.

Atkins was a bus driver who was convicted in 1999 for the murder of 20-year-old Sharmaine Hurley in the previous October. In 2000 he received a mandatory death sentence. He received an execution warrant in June 2002 but it was stayed by the Judicial Committee of the Privy Council, the supreme court of Barbados. On 3 September 2004, Atkins and three other death row inmates in Barbados appealed their sentences to the Inter-American Commission on Human Rights.

On 9 February 2005, Barbados issued another death warrant for Atkins, informing him that he was scheduled to be executed by hanging on 14 February. After appeals to the government by Amnesty International and the Special Rapporteur of the United Nations Commission on Human Rights, the Barbados High Court agreed to stay the execution.

Later in 2005, Atkins died in prison of an illness. In December 2007, the Inter-American Court on Human Rights ruled that Atkins's mandatory sentence and the mandatory sentence provisions of the Barbados murder statute violate the right to life guarantees of the American Convention on Human Rights.
