= Nellie Weekes =

Barbadian nurse, midwife, politician and women's rights activist

- Weekes, 1982
- Born: Muriel Odessa Walcott; 26 August 1896; Saint Michael, Barbados, British West Indies
- Died: 11 May 1990 (aged 93); Bridgetown, Barbados
- Other names: Muriel Odessa Weekes
- Occupations: nurse, midwife, politician, activist
- Years active: 1916–1982

Muriel Odessa "Nellie" Weekes (26 August 1896 – 11 May 1990) was a Bajan nurse and midwife who was active in women's rights issues. Campaigning for better pay and working in social welfare projects, she turned to politics in the 1940s at a time when most women were not politically active in Barbados. Though she unsuccessfully ran for a seat in the House of Assembly three times in the 1940s, she was elected to the Christ Church Vestry in 1958, serving for many years.

== Early life ==
Muriel Odessa "Nellie" Walcott was born on 26 August 1896 to Daniel Walcott in Saint Michael Parish in the British West Indies' colony of Barbados. Her parents owned and operated a grocery store. She grew up in My Lord's Hill as one of 13 children and attended Belmont Girls' School. After completing her secondary education at Lynch's Secondary School, she studied nursing while working at the Old Barbados General Hospital and midwifery at St. Michael's Almshouse.

== Career ==
Walcott worked as a nurse and midwife. Wanting to improve the care available in the community, she founded the School of Bedside Nursing and the Culinary School for Women. She was also active in the Choir for the Animation of the Sick and Incapacitated, an organization founded by Harold Rock, which used music therapy to cheer patients confined in children's homes, hospitals, at home or in prison. Participating in many social welfare projects, including the Dorcas League, which championed trade skills for workers, and the Universal Negro Improvement Association, she campaigned for better salaries for teachers and nurses. Walcott married Charles Nathaniel Weekes, a World War I veteran and hotelier. Together they operated a catering business. They were involved in the operations of the Colonial Hotel, the Ritz Hotel, the Standard Hotel, and Weekes' Canteen.

After decades of working as a nurse and caterer, Weekes recognized that if women's status were to be improved, they had to be involved in policy-making. Though widely criticized for her outspoken belief in equality, she ran as a candidate for the House of Assembly representing the St. George constituency in 1942. Unsuccessful, she ran again in 1944 as a representative for the City of Bridgetown. That year women were granted the right both to vote and to stand for election for either house of Parliament, if they met the property requirement or had income of £20 per year. At her rally on 13 October, all the speakers were women, but again she was defeated. She contested but lost her bid for the St. George seat again in 1946 but was successful in being elected to the Christ Church Vestry in 1958. In 1959, she became a founder and served as the first vice president for the Barbados Labour Party's Women's League.

Issues that she pushed during her time on the vestry included minimum wage standards; higher salaries for civil servants including firemen, nurses, policemen, postmen, and teachers; establishment of public utilities; and measures to require the government to provide proper nutritional meals to those people who were under government care. She also was vocal about the need to provide teaching on African heritage. An active member of the Barbados Women's Alliance, she also advocated for amendments to the Bastardy Act and for rape trials to be held in private chambers, equal opportunities in girls' education, and adequate training in family planning. She remained active in social issues in Barbados into the early 1980s, when she had to have her legs amputated.

== Death and legacy ==
Weekes died on 11 May 1990 in Bridgetown, Barbados. She is remembered as a pioneer and "trailblazer" in the struggle for women's rights in the country.
