= Clement Payne =

Trinidadian-born Barbadian trade unionist

Clement Osbourne Payne (1904 – 7 April 1941) was a Trinidad-born pioneer in the Caribbean trade union movement. By an act of Parliament in 1998, Payne was named as one of the eleven National Heroes of Barbados.

== Biography ==
Payne was born in Trinidad in 1904 to Barbadian parents who moved back to Barbados when he was four years old. Payne attended Bay Street Boys' School, and subsequently worked for some years as a junior clerk. In 1927 he returned to Trinidad, where as an advocate of social justice he was involved with the growth of militant trade unionism.

In Bridgetown, capital of Barbados, in 1937, Payne led black Barbadians to resist the white planter class. He organized several public meetings and aroused the ire of the police and government. Payne was put under observation until finally he was charged with making a false statement. The claim was that he had identified himself as Barbadian upon his re-entry at the Port, while actually being Trinidadian. Payne initially represented himself and entered a not-guilty plea. After an adjournment, he was found guilty, but Payne appealed the conviction and won. Despite this, on 26 July 1937, he was ordered to leave the country. At this point his supporters hired Grantley Herbert Adams as his attorney. Adams advised him to comply with the deportation and he was secreted away in the early morning on a boat to Trinidad. After Payne was deported, four days of rioting ensued, during which stores were burned and looted and cars pushed into the sea. The police opened fire, killing 14 demonstrators and wounding 47. The rioting led to a political commission of inquiry (the Moyne Commission) to investigate the situation in Barbados and other British West Indies colonies. The Moyne Commission determined that all of Payne's charges against the island's rulers were accurate. In its report, it insisted on reforms that Payne had proposed, including the introduction of trade union legislation.

Payne died at the age of 37 in 1941.

== Legacy ==
The Clement Payne Movement is a leftist Barbadian political party named after Payne.

The Clement Payne Cultural Centre was set up in Barbados in 1989 to perpetuate his memory and to continue his work of enlightening Barbadians about their history and struggle. There is a Clement Payne Memorial Bust in Golden Square, Bridgetown.
