= Adriel Brathwaite =

Barbadian politician

The Honourable Adriel Dermont Brathwaite, S.C.

Personal details
- Education: Harrison College

Adriel Dermont Brathwaite, SC (born 1962) is a Barbadian politician and lawyer, who formally held the positions of Attorney-General, Minister of Home Affairs, and Member of Parliament for Saint Philip South.

== Career ==
Brathwaite is an attorney-at-law of over thirty years of practice. He worked in the British Virgin Islands for ten years before returning to Barbados. He was elected to Parliament as MP for Saint Philip South in the 2008 election. He was named Attorney-General and Minister of Home Affairs in July 2010, to replace Freundel Stuart who had been elevated to acting Prime Minister and served until 2018. He is presently the principal of Horizon Chambers which he founded in 2005 and is managing director of Horizon Corporate Management Inc., a licensed corporate service provider registered in Barbados. Brathwaite has been involved in the financial management for international business clients for the last thirty years.

Brathwaite grew up in Marchfield, Saint Philip Parish. He did his primary education at St Martins Primary (now Reynold Weekes Primary) and his secondary education at Harrison College. He went on to the University of the West Indies for his LL.B, and then earned his Legal Education Certificate from the Hugh Wooding Law School.
