= David Comissiong =

Vincentian-born political activist (born 1960)

- Born: David Andre Comissiong; 1960 (age 65–66); St. Vincent and the Grenadines
- Education: Harrison College; University of the West Indies at Cave Hill; Hugh Wooding Law School
- Occupations: Attorney and political activist
- Children: 2

David Comissiong (born 1960) is a Vincentian-born political activist, founder of the Clement Payne Movement, and former head of the Barbadian government's Commission for Pan-African affairs. He is a frequent critic of globalization and United States hegemony. One of the key Pan-Africanists in Caribbean politics, Comissiong is the Barbados Ambassador to the Caribbean Community (CARICOM).

== Biography ==
David Andre Comissiong was born in 1960 in St. Vincent and the Grenadines. His father was a Methodist minister "served in eight different Caribbean territories", and when Comissiong at the age of six moved to Trinidad, where he undertook primary education, before relocating with his family to Barbados in 1971. He attended Harrison College in Barbados, and went on to study at the University of the West Indies at Cave Hill (Barbados), then at the Hugh Wooding Law School in Trinidad & Tobago, where he was admitted to the bar in 1984.

He starred in the multi-award-winning documentary 500 Years Later (2005), which featured Maulana Karenga, Muhammed Shareef, Francis Cress Welsin, Kimani Nehusi, Paul Robeson Jr, Nelson George, and many others.

Comissiong is the author of the 2013 book It's the Healing of the Nation: The Case For Reparations In An Era of Recession and Re-colonisation. He is also the author of Marching Down the Wide Streets of Tomorrow: Emancipation Essays and Speeches, published in 2008.

An attorney by profession, he is married with two daughters.

Since 2018, Comissiong has served as Ambassador of Barbados to CARICOM.

== Bibliography ==
- Marching Down the Wide Streets of Tomorrow: Emancipation Essays and Speeches, 2008, ISBN 978-976-8219-51-0, ISBN 976-8219-51-3
- It's the Healing of the Nation: The Case For Reparations In An Era of Recession and Re-colonisation, 2013, ISBN 978-976-95522-3-4.
- The Pan-African Love Story of Arnold and Mignon Ford, 2020, ISBN 978-9769653702.
