= John D. E. Boyce =

Barbadian politician

John David Edward Boyce is a former Minister of Transport and Works and Minister of Health of Barbados.
