= Alphea Wiggins =

Barbadian politician

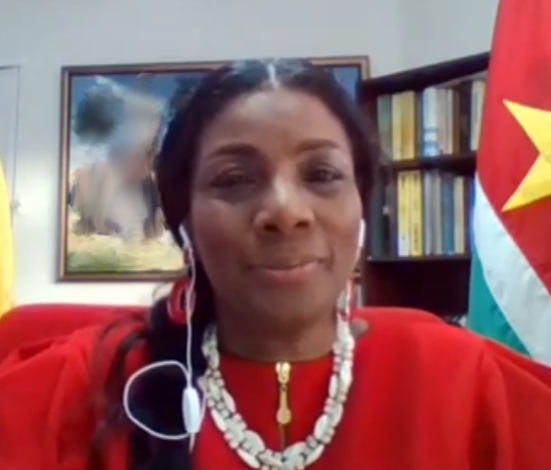
- In an online interview in 2020

Member of the Senate of Barbados
- Incumbent
- Assumed office 30 September 2018

Personal details
- Party: Independent
- Occupation: Politician, diplomat

Alphea M. Wiggins was a Barbadian politician. In 2018, she was appointed to the Senate of Barbados. She served as Special Envoy to Guyana and Suriname.
