= Clyde Mascoll =

Barbadian politician

The Honourable Clyde Mascoll

Leader of the Opposition
- In office November 2001 – January 2006
- Prime Minister: Owen Arthur
- Preceded by: David Thompson
- Succeeded by: David Thompson

Personal details
- Born: 15 December 1959 (age 66) Barbados
- Party: Democratic Labour Party (Until 2006); Barbados Labour Party (2006-present)
- Spouse: Cyrillene Thomas-Mascoll
- Profession: Politician; Economist; Lecturer

The Hon. Clyde Mascoll (born 15 December 1959) is a politician from Barbados. He is a former leader of the Democratic Labour Party (DLP). In 2003, Mascoll unsuccessfully led the party in an election against the ruling Barbados Labour Party (BLP). However, after internal disagreement within the DLP, Mascoll "crossed the floor" to become a member of the ruling BLP in 2006, becoming Minister of State in the Ministry of Finance.

He was defeated in his St. Michael North West constituency by the DLP's Christopher Sinckler in the January 2008 general election, receiving 44% of the vote.
