= Donnya Piggott =

American entrepreneur and human rights advocate

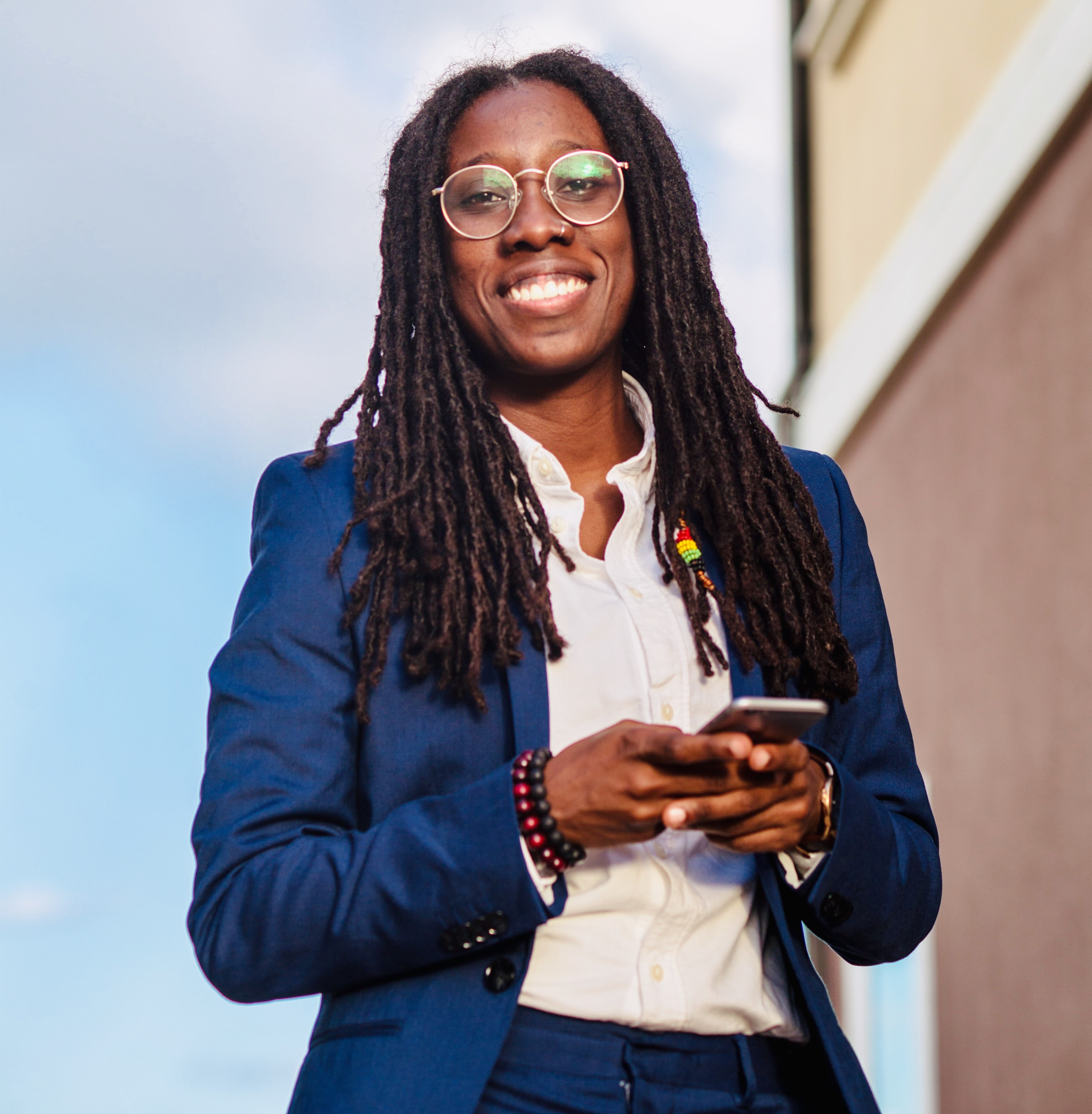
- Born: Donnya D. Piggott; 1990 (age 35–36); Barbados
- Other name: Zi
- Years active: 2012 – present
- Known for: co-founding Pink Coconuts and BGLAD
- Website: Pink Coconuts

Donnya D. "Zi" Piggott (born 1990) is a tech entrepreneur, designer and human rights advocate from Barbados. In 2012, she co-founded B-GLAD, a support organisation for LGBTQ persons in Barbados. In 2015, she was awarded Queen Elizabeth's Young Leaders Award for her activism in changing the lives of young people. Donnya is currently the CEO and co-founder of Pink Coconuts.

== Biography ==
Donnya Piggott was born in 1990 in Barbados. She attended the University of the West Indies studying history and accounts. In 2012 Piggott founded an association Barbados Gays, Lesbians and All-Sexuals Against Discrimination B-GLAD as an organisation to create an education mechanism and open public dialogue in a supportive manner for the LGBTQ community of Barbados. In a 2020 interview, Piggott revealed that her being a young homeless lesbian at the age of 22 was what motivated her to found the organization—especially for others who were also in desperate need for an LGBTQ community.

According to Piggott, her organisation focuses on people's common humanity. Piggott believes that approaching homosexuality from a moral standpoint results in stalemate. Instead, she believes that the questions of focus are whether discrimination is legal and whether equal opportunity for employment and protection under the law should exist for all people.

In June 2014, Piggott joined with other LGBTQ support groups throughout the Caribbean in a project called Generation Change. Activists from the region called on heads of state to embrace all members of society and eliminate discriminatory laws and customs. In response to B-GLAD's appeal, Prime Minister Freundel Stuart said he was committed to eliminating discrimination for all Bajans, including the LGBTQ community. A study completed by B-Glad in 2014, The State of LGBT Barbados: A Brief Overview, found that stigma and discrimination, unequal and homophobic legislation, and lack of acceptance produce "covert oppression" for LGBTQ Bajans. Piggott stressed that the harshness of Barbadian law, which calls for life imprisonment for consensual sexual acts, leads to feelings of non-acceptance, depression, substance abuse, absence from school due to fear of discrimination.

In January 2015, Piggott was named as one of the recipients of the Queen's Young Leader Award. The award provides recognition to young leaders across the Commonwealth in the name of HM Queen Elizabeth II, the Head of the Commonwealth and the Head of State of Barbados. Queen Elizabeth presented the award in June 2015.

Piggott is the CEO and Founder of Pink Coconuts, a platform that connects LGBTQ travellers with LGBTQ friendly accommodation, tours and activities across the world while empowering LGBTQ local LGBTQ lives. She is TEDx Bridgetown speaker and in 2017 she became a Watson University Scholar where she studied Social Entrepreneurship in Boulder, Colorado. In 2019, Donnya was named the winner of the Sustainable Development Goal 10 Challenge by One Young World for her social impact idea behind Pink Coconuts - a worldwide competition which saw thousands of entries from all over the world.
