= 1986 Barbadian general election =

- 28 May 1986

27 seats in the House of Assembly 14 seats needed for a majority
- Turnout: 76.70% (▲5.12pp)
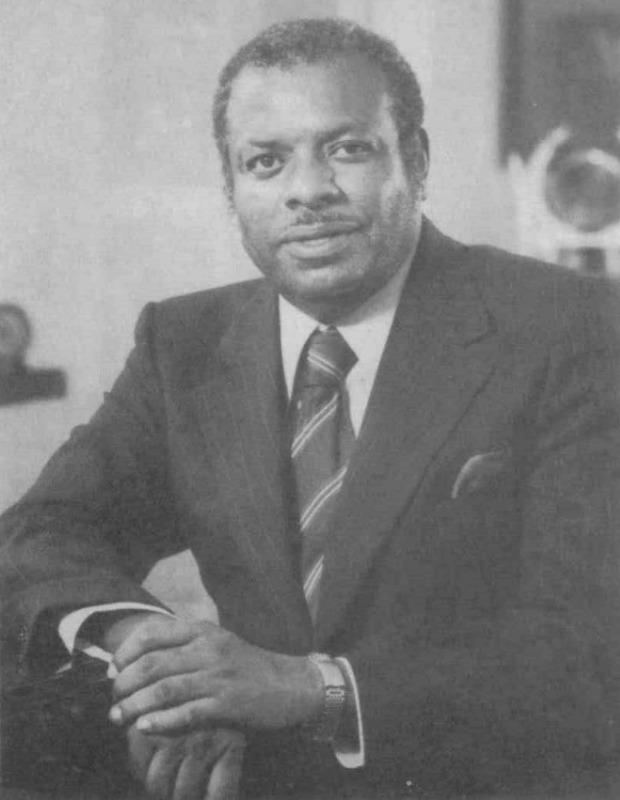

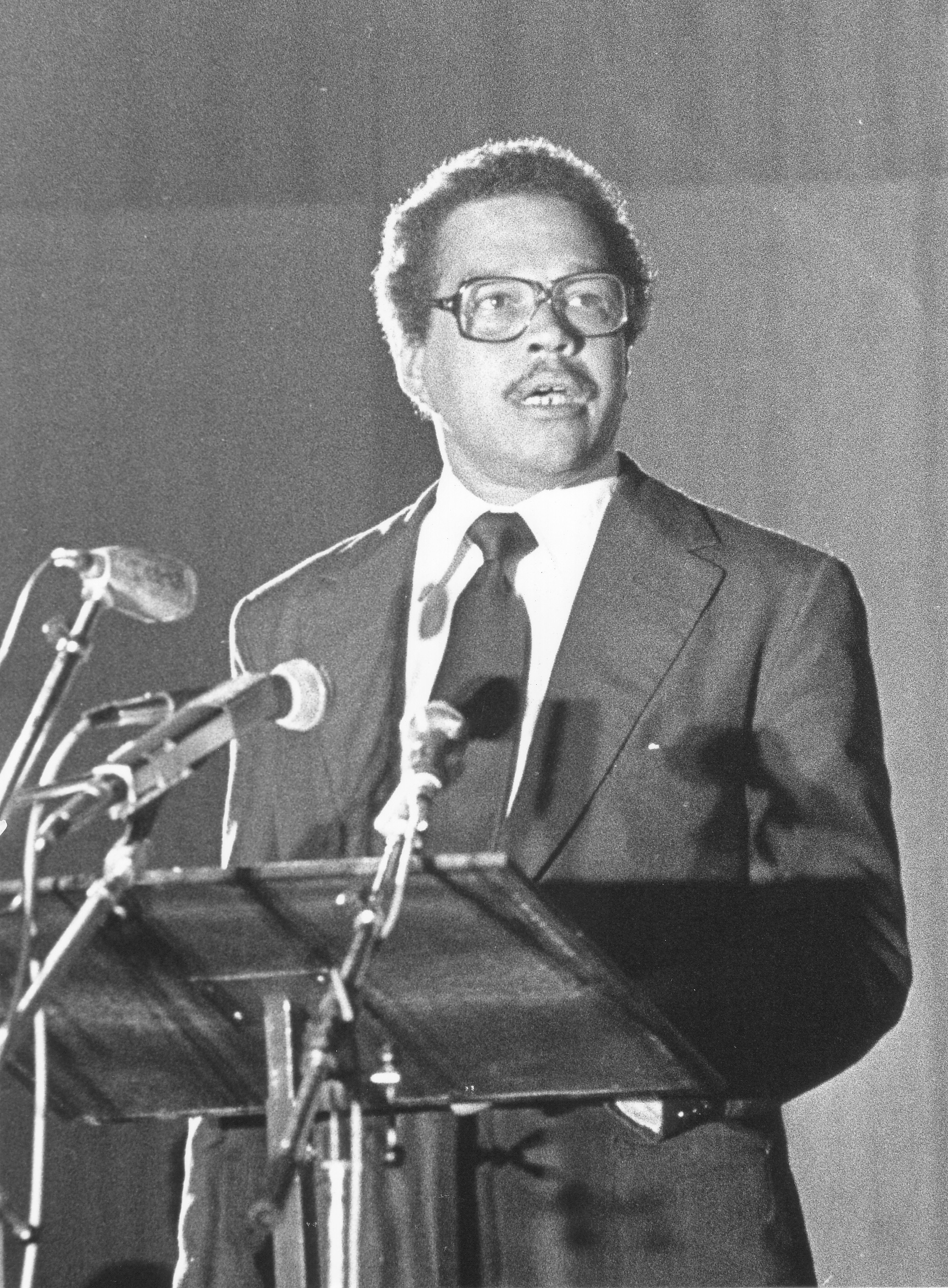
| | First party | Second party |
|---|---|---|
| Leader | Errol Barrow | Bernard St. John |
| Party | DLP | BLP |
| Leader's seat | St. John | Christ Church East Central (Defeated) |
| Last election | 10 seats | 17 seats |
| Seats won | 24 | 3 |
| Seat change | ▲14 | ▼14 |
| Popular vote | 80,050 | 54,367 |
| Percentage | 59.45% | 40.37% |
| Swing | ▲12.32pp | ▼11.85pp |
- Results by constituency
Prime Minister before election
Harold Bernard St. John
BLP
Elected Prime Minister
Errol Barrow
DLP

General elections were held in Barbados on 28 May 1986. The result was a landslide victory for the Democratic Labour Party, which won 24 of the 27 seats. Among the Barbados Labour Party MPs who lost their seats was incumbent Prime Minister Harold Bernard St. John. The Workers Party of Barbados contested the elections for the first and only time, the only occasion on which a communist party contested an election in Barbados. Voter turnout was 77%.

== Results ==
| Party | Votes | % | Seats | +/– |
|---|---|---|---|---|
| Democratic Labour Party | 80,050 | 59.45 | 24 | +14 |
| Barbados Labour Party | 54,367 | 40.37 | 3 | –14 |
| Workers Party of Barbados | 40 | 0.03 | 0 | New |
| Independents | 202 | 0.15 | 0 | 0 |
| Total | 134,659 | 100.00 | 27 | 0 |
| Valid votes | 134,659 | 99.33 | | |
| Invalid/blank votes | 903 | 0.67 | | |
| Total votes | 135,562 | 100.00 | | |
| Registered voters/turnout | 176,739 | 76.70 | | |
Source: Nohlen
