= HIV Legal Network =

Canadian advocacy organization

The HIV Legal Network (formerly the Canadian HIV/AIDS Legal Network) is Canada's leading advocacy organization working on the legal and human rights issues raised by HIV and AIDS. The organization actively promotes the human rights of people living with and vulnerable to HIV and AIDS, in Canada and internationally, through research and analysis, advocacy and litigation, public education, and community mobilization. The organization was founded in Montreal, Quebec, Canada, in 1992, by human rights lawyers Ralf Jürgens, David Patterson, David Thompson, and Norman Halde. It is currently located in Toronto, Ontario, Canada.

== Issues ==
Unjust laws and policies and violations of human rights continue to worsen the impact of HIV and AIDS. The Legal Network's mandate focuses on ensuring that the human rights of people living with and affected by HIV and AIDS are respected, protected, and fulfilled; and that Canadian and international laws and policies facilitate HIV prevention efforts, as well as care, treatment, and support for people living with HIV and AIDS. While the Legal Network is based in Canada, their work extends around the world, wherever human rights are threatened, including the rights of LGBTQ people. Recently, the Legal Network launched a new fund, the Caribbean Can Rainbow Fund, to benefit this important work in the Caribbean. The organization's research, analysis, education, and advocacy touches on a range of issues: Aboriginal Communities, Access to Medicines, The Caribbean, Criminalization, Discrimination, Drug Policy, Immigration and Travel, Income Security, LGBTQ Rights, Prevention Technologies, Prisons, Privacy, Sex Work, Testing, Women's Rights, Russia, and Rights.

== Publications ==
The Legal Network produces an extensive range of publications on numerous HIV-related legal and policy issues, including info sheets, Q&A documents, briefing papers, submissions to governments and other advocacy materials, commentaries and research articles in journals, and full-length research and analytical reports. The organization has received international recognition as one of the world's foremost sources of materials on the legal and human rights aspects of HIV and AIDS.

In 1994, the Legal Network began publishing the HIV/AIDS Policy & Law Review (originally the Canadian HIV/AIDS Policy & Law Newsletter), with approximately three bilingual issues published annually. In 2012 and after 18 years of publication, the Legal Network announced that it would be putting the Review on an "indefinite hiatus" due to a lack of available funds resulting from a significant federal funding cut to the organization's annual budget. The Review summarized and analyzed current developments in HIV-related policy and law, promoted education and the exchange of information, ideas, and experiences from an international perspective around human rights issues affecting the global HIV response. Archived copies of the Review are hosted on the Legal Network's website and have remained freely accessible for download.

== Films ==
The Legal Network has produced the following films:

1. Positive Women: Exposing Injustice (2012)
2. Consent: HIV Non-Disclosure and Sexual Assault Law (2015)
