= David Thompson (Barbadian politician) =

Prime Minister of Barbados from 2008 to 2010

The Right Honourable David Thompson QC
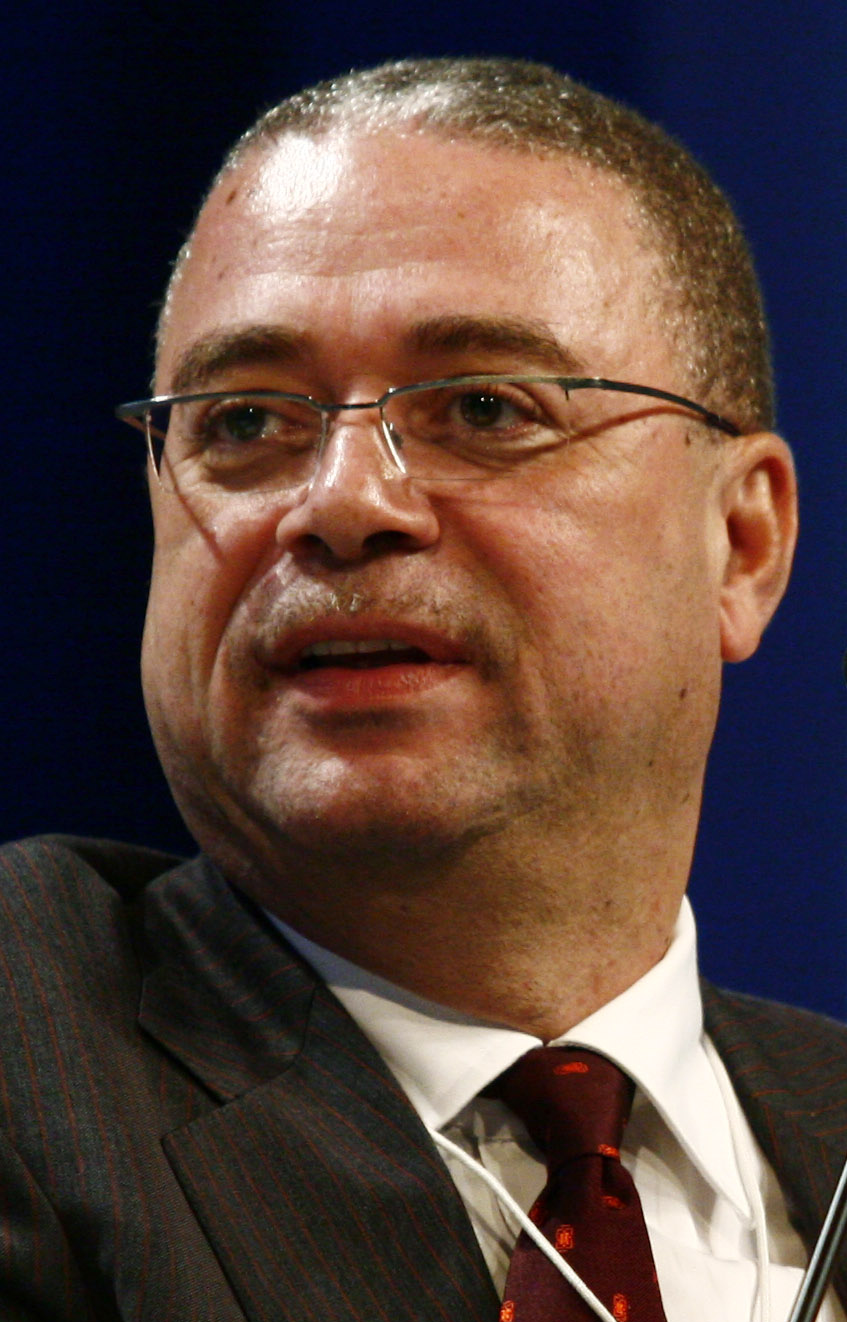
- Thompson in April 2010

6th Prime Minister of Barbados
- In office 16 January 2008 – 23 October 2010
- Monarch: Elizabeth II
- Governor-General: Clifford Husbands
- Deputy: Freundel Stuart
- Preceded by: Owen Arthur
- Succeeded by: Freundel Stuart

Leader of the Opposition
- In office September 1994 – September 2000
- Prime Minister: Owen Arthur
- Preceded by: Owen Arthur
- Succeeded by: Clyde Mascoll
- In office January 2006 – January 2008
- Prime Minister: Owen Arthur
- Preceded by: Clyde Mascoll
- Succeeded by: Mia Mottley

Member of Parliament for Saint John
- In office 16 July 1987 – 23 October 2010
- Preceded by: Errol Barrow
- Succeeded by: Mara Thompson

Personal details
- Born: 25 December 1961 London, United Kingdom
- Died: 23 October 2010 (aged 48) Mapps, Barbados
- Party: Democratic Labour Party (1978-2010)
- Spouse: Mara Thompson
- Children: Misha; Oya; Osa-Marie
- Profession: Lawyer

David John Howard Thompson (25 December 1961 – 23 October 2010) was the sixth prime minister of Barbados from 15 January 2008 until his death from pancreatic cancer on 23 October 2010.

== Early life ==
Thompson was born in London to Charles Thompson, an Afro-Barbadian porter and painter, and Margaret Knight, a White Barbadian author, secretary and nurse. Both parents remained strong influences in Thompson's life. Thompson was brought up with his three siblings at Fitts Village, Saint James.

Thompson attended primary school at St Gabriel's Junior School and secondary school at Combermere School. He earned a Legal Education Certificate from Hugh Wooding Law School. Thompson graduated with honors from the University of the West Indies at Cave Hill law school in 1984. He was admitted to the Barbados bar in 1984 and taught as a part-time tutor in law at the University of the West Indies from 1986 to 1988. His law firm was Thompson & Associates.

== Politics ==
Thompson first entered the Democratic Labour Party in 1978 and served in the Senate of Barbados until 1987. A by-election after the death of the Prime Minister Errol Barrow, gaining his parliamentary seat for Saint John in 1987. During Erskine Sandiford's term as prime minister, Thompson served as Minister of Community Development and Culture from 1991 to 1993. He was subsequently appointed Minister of Finance from 1993 to 1994. Thompson was elected and became leader of the DLP when Sandiford resigned after losing a parliamentary no confidence motion. Thompson was unopposed in that Leadership Election. Thompson unsuccessfully led the Democratic Labour Party in elections in 1994 and 1999. Shortly after the 1994 Barbadian general election, Thompson made his shadow cabinet including him as Shadow Minister for Finance, Economic Affairs and Investment He resigned as party leader in September 2000 following his third electoral defeat as party leader in the St. Thomas by-election. A leadership election was held to determine the future of the Democratic Labour Party (Barbados), where Clyde Mascoll defeated Freundel Stuart. However, when party leader Clyde Mascoll was forced to resign (as party leader) since his popularity had been eroded by internal party skirmishes it cleared the way for Thompson to once again became opposition leader but he became Chairman of the Democratic Labour Party (Barbados) instead of President in January 2006. Clyde Mascoll after seemingly being mistreated by the party he was born into and grew up in then decided to switch allegiance to the Barbados Labour Party,

== Prime Minister ==
The DLP won the general election held on 15 January 2008 with 20 seats against 10 for the Barbados Labour Party, which was led by former prime minister Owen Arthur. Thompson was sworn in as prime minister on 16 January, becoming Barbados' sixth prime minister and the third to serve under the DLP. Thompson was also re-elected to his own seat from St. John constituency with 84% of the vote. He announced his Cabinet on 19 January, including himself as Minister of Finance, Economic Affairs and Development, Labour, Civil Service and Energy; it was sworn in on 20 January.

He never resided at the Prime Minister's Official Residence at Ilaro Court, and stated that he never wanted to move there, and so lived at Mapps, Barbados during his tenure as prime minister.

The Governor-General scheduled a by-election for 20 January 2011 to fill the vacant seat in the House of Assembly formerly held by Thompson. Thompson's wife Mara was the DLP-candidate in the by-election for her late husband's former seat. She won the seat by an overwhelming margin, defeating BLP opponent Hudson Griffith 4 613 votes to 553.

== Health issues and death ==
At a media briefing at his official Ilaro Court residence on 14 May 2010, Thompson, accompanied by his personal physician, Richard Ishmael, said that he had been suffering with stomach pains since early March. He also revealed he had undergone tests in Barbados, which were inconclusive, and had also travelled with Ishmael to New York where additional tests were carried out. The process of testing would be ongoing and, because of this, Attorney General and Deputy Prime Minister Freundel Stuart would assume the Prime Minister's office in Thompson's absence.

On 30 August, Thompson re-assumed his post of prime minister, having returned to Barbados the day before. On 7 September, he left Barbados for New York on a trip of unknown nature. A short time later Thompson's personal physician, Richard Ishmael, informed the general public that the Prime Minister was suffering from pancreatic cancer. However, when the news came of the fact that it was pancreatic cancer, many realised that such a diagnoses would have been known in the very early stages of the tests (even the local ones) and that it was kept secret more so for political reasons than for personal reasons.

Prior to Thompson's death a prepared letter was read-out on behalf of Thompson outlining his desires for political party and country. Hours later, Thompson died at his home in Mapps, St. Philip, at approximately 2:10 am on 23 October 2010. His mother, wife Mara and daughters Misha, Oya and Osa-Marie were by his side, as well as his sister, Liz.

Thompson was the third sitting prime minister of Barbados to die in office following the deaths of Tom Adams in 1985 and Errol Barrow in 1987. He was also the 7th head of government of a CARICOM country to die in office since CARICOM was founded in 1973.

== State funeral and mourning ==
As news of Thompson's death spread, regional and international dignitaries expressed their condolences. to the Thompson family and the nation. Pope Benedict XVI was among those offering condolences for the Prime Minister and stated that he "invokes God's blessings upon the late Prime Minister's family and the people of Barbados." Barbadian pop star Rihanna, who was appointed by Thompson as an 'Honorary Ambassador of Culture' of Barbados, also expressed her sadness at the passing of the Prime Minister. Condolences have also been extended to Barbados by the United Nations General Assembly, and the then Secretary General of the United Nations, Ban Ki-moon. As well as former prime minister Lloyd Erskine Sandiford, and U.S. President Obama.

Barbados entered an official period of mourning for the former prime minister on 23 October. On that date, the government-owned national broadcaster began airing tributes of the Prime Minister. Such tributes included some of Thompson's speeches and debates, as well as some local and international statements of condolence to his family, extended family, and the nation. The mourning period was also stated to be in effect for Barbados until the official state funeral. On Monday 25 October Senator Maxine McClean announced in a televised broadcast the full arrangements for the funeral of PM Thompson; Senator McClean stated that on 28 October 2010 (from 9am–11am) Thompson would first have a closed viewing in the east-wing of the Parliament of Barbados. That viewing will be upstairs in the chamber of the House of Assembly and would follow Barbados' Table of Precedence for members of Government from the Governor General down to MPs. On that same date members of the general public could later view Thompson at the House of Assembly from 11am-5pm. On 29 October, from 2pm-5pm a public viewing would take place at Thompson's alma mater, The Combermere School. On 30 October, a viewing for the general public took place at the George Street Auditorium from 9am-5pm. On Monday, 1 November from 10am-5pm a general public viewing took place in Thompson's home constituency of Saint John at the Parish Church. On 2 November, Thompson will again have a general public viewing at the House of Assembly from 9am-5pm. The official state funeral for the Prime Minister took place on 3 November at the Kensington Oval stadium and was strictly a ticket only event. Over ten thousand persons, including foreign dignitaries and diplomatic representatives, attended the state funeral. Thousands more lined the streets of Bridgetown that morning to pay their respects as the official funeral procession made its way through the city en route to the Oval. Both the state funeral at the Kensington Oval and the interment at the St. John's (Anglican) Parish Church were broadcast live by CBC TV 8. Mr. Thompson's final resting place is in the church's cemetery and overlooks the east coast of the island.

== Personal life ==
Thompson was married to Mara Thompson (née Giraudy), who was born in Saint Lucia. The couple had three daughters - Misha, Oya and Osa-Marie. The family resided in Mapps, St. Philip, though Thompson resided at the official Prime Minister's residence Ilaro Court from 2008 until 2010.

== Legacy ==
- The David Thompson Health & Social Services Complex (DTHSSC), (also known as the St. John Polyclinic), Glebe Land, Parish of St. John.
- The Annual David Thompson Memorial Constituency Councils Football Classic

== Notes ==
Parliament of Barbados
Preceded by Errol Barrow	Member of Parliament for Saint John; 1987–2010	Succeeded by Mara Thompson
Political offices
Preceded by Lloyd Erskine Sandiford	Minister of Finance of Barbados; 1993–1994	Succeeded by Owen Arthur
Preceded by Owen Arthur	Prime Minister of Barbados; 2008–2010	Succeeded by Freundel Stuart
Preceded by Owen Arthur	Minister of Finance of Barbados; 2008–2010	Succeeded by David Estwick
