= 2008 Barbadian general election =

- 15 January 2008

All 30 seats in the House of Assembly 16 seats needed for a majority
- Turnout: 63.54% (▲6.66pp)
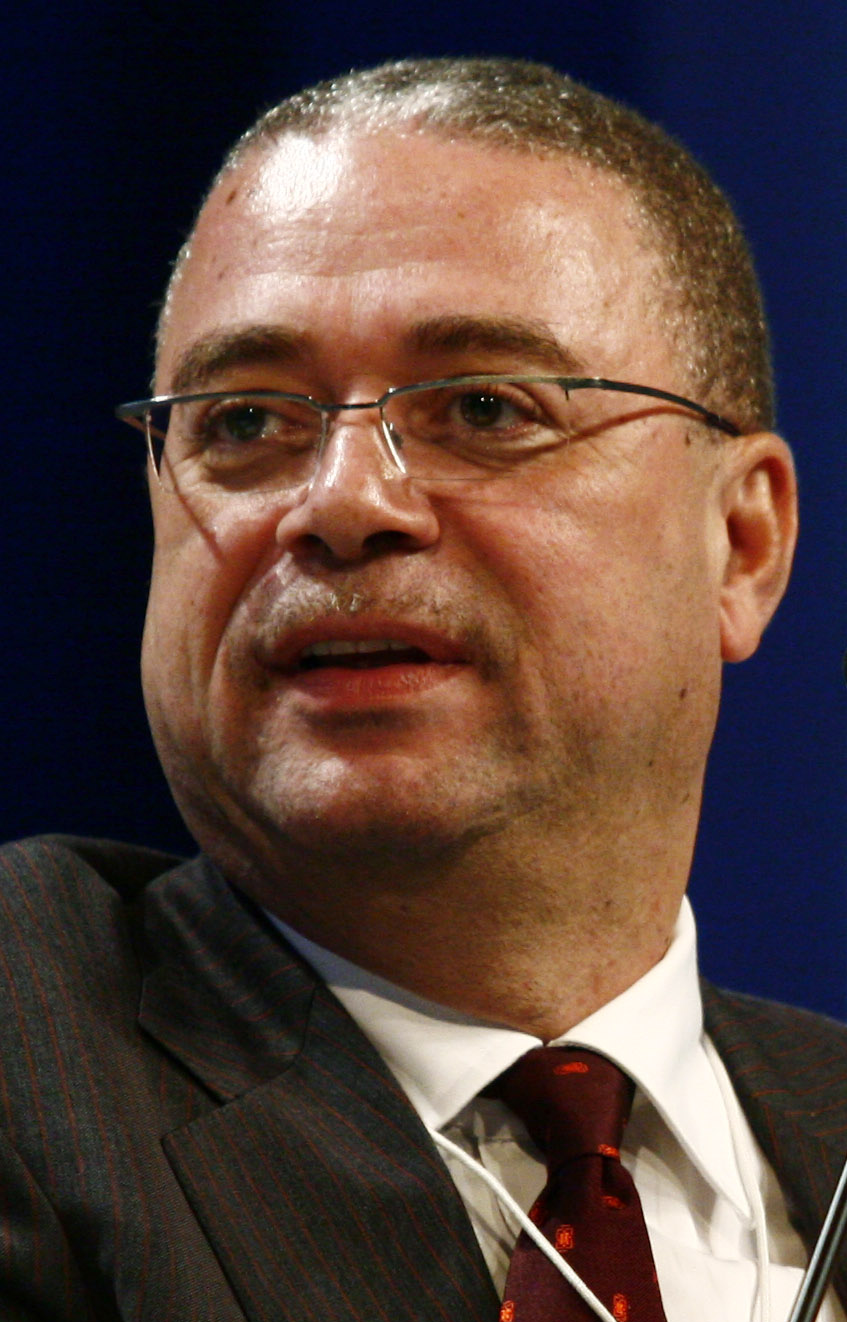

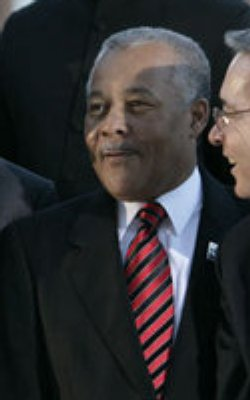
	First party	Second party
Leader	David Thompson	Owen Arthur
Party	DLP	BLP
Last election	44.09%, 7 seats	55.80%, 23 seats
Seats won	20	10
Seat change	▲13	▼13
Popular vote	77,681	69,720
Percentage	52.55%	47.16%
Swing	▲8.46pp	▼8.64pp
- Results by constituency
Prime Minister before election
Owen Arthur
BLP
Elected Prime Minister
David Thompson
DLP

General elections were held in Barbados on 15 January 2008. A concurrent referendum to determine whether or not to become a republic was initially planned but the vote was postponed.

The Democratic Labour Party (DLP), which had been in opposition since 1994, won with 20 seats to 10 seats for the Barbados Labour Party, led by Prime Minister Owen Arthur. Recounts were held in some constituencies due to close results.

On 11 September 2008 Hamilton Lashley MP, for St. Michael South-East announced he would cross the floor and no longer be a member of the Barbados Labour Party, but would instead become an independent. His defection brought the BLP as Opposition down to nine seats for the remainder of the parliamentary session. He later decided to join the ruling DLP.

DLP chairman David Thompson was sworn in as Prime Minister on 16 January. After David Thompson died in October 2010 a by-election was held in January 2011 to fill his vacant seat for St. John.

== Results ==
Party	Votes	%	Seats	+/–
Democratic Labour Party	77,681	52.55	20	+13
Barbados Labour Party	69,720	47.16	10	–13
People's Empowerment Party	235	0.16	0	New
People's Democratic Congress	46	0.03	0	New
Independents	144	0.10	0	0
Total	147,826	100.00	30	0
Valid votes	147,826	98.79		
Invalid/blank votes	1,807	1.21		
Total votes	149,633	100.00		
Registered voters/turnout	235,510	63.54		
Source: Electoral Department, Election Passport
