= Elections in Barbados =

Elections in Barbados are held to choose members to fill elective offices in the House of Assembly. Elections are held on Election Day. These general elections do not have fixed dates, but must be called within five years of the opening of parliament following the last election. A former minister of the DLP, Warwick Franklin summed up the general elections process in Barbados as saying it is really just, "30 by-elections on the same day."

Barbadian election rules are bound by certain parts of the local Constitution, various other separate legislation, and other regulations or administrative rules, or Regulations made by the commission.

The politics in recent years are two-party, dominated by the centre-left Barbados Labour Party and the social-democratic Democratic Labour Party. Presently, it is difficult for other parties to achieve electoral success.

In February 2026, prime minister Mia Mottley won her third consecutive election victory by a landslide, meaning her Barbados Labour party won again all the 30 seats in the House of Assembly.

== Authority ==
Elections in Barbados are the responsibility of the Electoral and Boundaries Commission (E&BC). The E&BC is an independent body under the Prime Minister's Office (in his or her capacity as Minister of Finance.), which is responsible for the E&BC's actual financial administration. The E&BC is headed by the Chief Electoral Officer, and has five members/commissioners, who are chosen based solely on expertise. These members are chosen by both the prime minister and opposition, and can serve for a term of 5 years.

== Voting eligibility ==
Voting in Barbados by law is voluntary, with registration for elections undertaken by the Election Management Body (EMB). The requirements for voter eligibility are the following :

- A citizen of Barbados, who is 18 years of age or older, and has resided in an electoral constituency for at least three months prior to the Qualifying Date.
- A Commonwealth citizen, 18 years of age or older, who has resided legally in Barbados for a period of at least three consecutive years and has resided in an electoral constituency for a least three months prior to the Qualifying Date.
- A Non-Commonwealth Citizen, who is 18 years of age or older, who has resided legally in Barbados for a period of at least seven years and has resided in an electoral constituency for a least three months prior to the Qualifying Date.

== Polling ==
For an election to take place the President must formally issue a writ thus requiring an election be held.

Shortly before Election Day, a card will be mailed to Constituents indicating the location of their polling station. To take part during Elections Day, the electorate visits their specified polling station where they are registered for the national elections. At the polling station, eligible voter must present their National ID card to be given a single paper ballot. To cast a vote, the elector must manually mark their ballot. They do so by placing a cross ("X") next to the candidate they want to represent them. (Any other mark or comment on the paper renders it an invalid ballot.) Upon completion, the anonymous ballot is then placed into a sealed ballot box for later counting.

Voting outside the country by the general public is not allowed at Barbados' various High Commissions, Embassies, and Consulates. However, diplomatic staff may vote Representation of the People's Act, "A person is qualified to be treated as a foreign service elector at any election in any constituency who is (a)serving abroad as the Head of a Mission or a member of the Staff of a Mission; (b)a member of the household of a person mentioned in paragraph (a)"

=== Counting ===
Ballot counting is undertaken at special counting centres. The ballot boxes are collected from each polling station in the constituency and taken to the counting centre. There, the seals are checked before the boxes are opened and the votes for each candidate are counted. The winner is determined by plurality voting. When the counting finishes, the results of voting in that constituency are announced by the returning officer, who declares the winner of the election.

== Candidates ==
Local government was dissolved between 1967 and 1969 when an Interim Commissioner for Local Government was set up to transfer all duties to the national government. This left solely the national government. Under the present system, the electors do not vote directly for a Prime Minister. Instead, electors vote on the running candidates in their constituency to choose whom they want to represent them in the House of Assembly. All other positions in the government are inherited, nominative or directly appointed.

=== Government ===
- President (Jeffrey Bostic)
  - Jointly nominated by the Prime Minister and the Leader of the Opposition 90 days before the incumbent's term expires and elected in a walkover without a vote. Otherwise, each chamber of Parliament must vote separately whether to accept or reject the nominee, requiring a two-thirds majority of valid votes cast in both chambers to elect a candidate on all rounds of balloting.
- Head of Government - According to the Constitution: "The Prime Minister is appointed by the President. The President appoints as Prime Minister the member of the House of Assembly who, in his judgement, is best able to command the confidence of a majority of the members of that House of Assembly."
- The Parliament of Barbados has two chambers:
  - The House of Assembly has 30 members, elected for a five-year term in single-seat constituencies.
  - The Senate has 21 appointed members: Of which, 7 are chosen by the President, 12 by the Prime Minister and 2 by the Leader of the Opposition.

=== Requirements ===
The eligibility requirements of contesting in the elections are the following :

- A citizen of Barbados, who is 21 years of age or older, and who has resided in Barbados for a period of at least seven years prior to the Qualifying Date.
- A Commonwealth citizen, 21 years of age or older, who has resided legally in Barbados for a period of at least seven years prior to the Qualifying Date. "Subject to the provisions of section 44, any person who - a. is a Commonwealth citizen of the age of twenty one years or upwards; and b. has such connection with Barbados by residence therein as may be prescribed by Parliament, shall be qualified to be elected as a member of the House of Assembly."

In order to become a candidate, there is a signature requirement which requires for nomination by at least 4 electors. Further, the potential candidate must also meet the deposit requirement of equivalent to BBD$250 (Barbados dollars), reimbursed if the candidate is elected or obtains more than 1/6 of the total votes cast in the constituency.

== Funding ==
Candidates do not receive public funding and no provisions have been created for such. There is no allocation of free broadcast time or free printed advertisement space to political parties and as such, candidates must pay for all advertising of their own campaigns. The practice of televised debates between candidates has happened in the past but is not commonplace in the process of elections. Some bodies, such as The Caribbean Development Research Services (CADRES) and The Cave Hill Associates Polling Organisation (Chapo)/Boxhil, may undertake their own opinion polls leading up to election day but the government generally doesn't undertake any polls.

== Disputes ==
Recounts are conducted by request of any candidate contesting in the general election. In the event of a dispute of any candidate, the Election Court (comprising three Judges) is responsible for trying the election petition - when hearing an election petition it has the same powers, jurisdiction and authority as the High Court.

== Referendums ==
There has been no precedent established for mandatory referendums in Barbados. In previous years the Owen Arthur government mooted the idea of having a referendum on whether to transforming the country into a republic. To date no precedents have been set to indicate any referendums results would become binding upon the government.

== Latest elections ==
Party	Votes	%	+/–	Seats	+/–
Barbados Labour Party	78,960	69.26	–4.21	30	0
Democratic Labour Party	30,112	26.41	+3.77	0	0
Alliance Party for Progress	3,090	2.71	New	0	0
Solutions Barbados	784	0.69	–1.76	0	0
Bajan Free Party	191	0.17	+0.10	0	0
New Barbados Kingdom Alliance	122	0.11	New	0	New
Barbados Sovereignty Party	120	0.11	New	0	New
Independents	634	0.56	–0.10	0	0
Total	114,013	100.00	–	30	0
Valid votes	114,013	99.62			
Invalid/blank votes	434	0.38			
Total votes	114,447	100.00			
Registered voters/turnout	266,339	42.97			
Source: Barbados Parliament

== List of general elections and largest party thereafter ==
=== Pre-independence ===
Election	Party
1940	VA
1942	BEA
1944	BPL-WINCP
1946	BLP
1948	BLP
1951	BLP
1956	BLP
1961	DLP
1966	DLP

=== Post-independence ===
==== Commonwealth realm ====
Election	Party
1971	DLP
1976	BLP
1981	BLP
1986	DLP
1991	DLP
1994	BLP
1999	BLP
2003	BLP
2008	DLP
2013	DLP
2018	BLP

==== Republic ====
Election	Party
2022	BLP
2026	BLP

== List of by-elections and the winning party thereafter ==
=== Pre-independence ===
By-Election	Party
1954	DLP
1958 (St. Joseph)	BLP
1958 (St. John)	DLP

=== Post-independence ===
==== Commonwealth realm ====
By-Election	Party
1969	BLP
1970	BLP
1976 (St. Phillip North)	BLP
1976 (City of Bridgetown)	BLP
1978	DLP
1984	BLP
1985	BLP
1987	DLP
1996	DLP
2001	BLP
2011	DLP
2020	BLP

==== Republic ====
By-Election	Party
2025	BLP

== See also ==
- Dominant-party system
- Duverger's law
- Electoral calendar
- Electoral system
- Landslide victory
- Politics of Barbados
- List of parliamentary constituencies of Barbados
