= Clennell Wickham =

Clennell Wilsden Wickham
- Born: 21 September 1895; St. Michael, Barbados
- Died: 6 October 1938 (aged 43); St. George's, Grenada
- Occupation: Journalist

Clennell Wilsden Wickham (21 September 1895 – 6 October 1938) was a radical West Indian journalist, editor of Barbadian newspaper The Herald and champion of black, working-class causes against the white planter oligarchy in colonial Barbados during the inter-war period, leading to the social unrest that triggered the Riots of 26 July 1937.

== Biography ==
Born in St Michael, Barbados, Wickham served in Palestine in the British West Indies Regiment of World War I. After his return to Barbados, he joined The Herald newspaper, edited by Clement A. Inniss, in 1919 and wrote for universal adult suffrage in a column under the title "Audax" (the listener). Wickham became sole editor of the newspaper following Inniss's early death.

In 1921, Wickham summarized attitudes of members of the Barbadian House of Assembly in the first years of the 20th century as follows: "There is no sense of duty to the individual of the island as a whole. There is no sense of responsibility for broad and reasonable treatment. There is merely a sense of class." By the late 1920s, he developed a reputation for being one of the foremost critics of the plantocracy and brought into the open that, although patterned after British common law, Barbadian law in 1900 was in a sense an objective code of rules whose ethical validity transcended the interests and attitudes of several classes on the island.

In May 1924, Charles Duncan O'Neal (1879–1936) led a delegation, comprising Wickham, John Beckles, J. A. Martineau and J. T. C. Ramsay, that called on the Barbados governor and requested him to take steps to ensure that the Education Board exercised its powers under the Education Act to ban child labour. Appeals of this sort directed to the governor and to the Legislature were made at regular intervals over the next twelve years to little or no avail.

During the 1930s economic and social conditions across the West Indies finally brought the explosions that had been simmering for decades. Wickham was a prescient journalist whose writings in the Barbados Herald newspaper were a major catalyst for change. He had his finger more closely than most on the pulse of the people and had warned that "an inarticulate majority brooding over unrepressed wrongs and unventilated grievances is a serious menace".

Barbados had a restricted voting system based on franchise and reinforced this system by allocating electoral worth only to those of a certain elevated social status. Clennell described the attitudes of the white assembly in the early 20eth century as follows:

"There is no sense of duty to the individuals of the island as a whole. There is no sense of responsibility for broad and reasonable treatment. There is merely a sense of class."

Wickham shaped a lot of Atholl Edwin Seymour "TT" Lewis's (1905–1959) political thought, and he had a high regard for the man. Once Lewis took up a copy of Wickham's magazine Outlook, from which he proceeded to read an article by Clennell and proffered nothing but praise for the man. Lewis boasted that he had all the copies of his magazine.

Lewis corresponded with Wickham and found him influential, lucid and of penetrating prose - stating Wickham had in the 1920s exposed, among other things, the social failings of the Barbadian plantation economy. By the time Lewis got to know Wickham, the latter had already lost a libel case in 1930 that separated him from the Herald newspaper and effectively exiled him to neighbouring island Grenada and suffered several years of frustration and great hardship. A Barbados special jury upheld the libel suit brought by the Bridgetown merchant W. D. Bayley against Clennell, who was represented by a young Grantley Adams and which resulted in the termination of his editorship of the newspaper and a change of its ownership.

Social upheaval spread throughout the British West Indies in the 1930s, taking the form of strikes and riots. Barbados was no exception, with the July Riots of 1937 that shocked the nation and led eventually to a wide range of political, social and labour reforms, as black middle-class Barbadians began to organise themselves in political parties and a labour union. The unrest was documented in a temporary exhibition by the Barbados Museum in 1998. By the time the riots were quelled fourteen people had been killed, forty-seven wounded and hundreds arrested.

During the 1930s to 1945 Wickham's contemporaries in the field of journalism and politics were O'Neal, Chrissie Brathwaite, Erskine Ward, Grantley Adams, Wynter Crawford (1910–1993), Hugh Springer (1913–1994), Frank Walcott (1916–1999), and H. A. Vaughan and many of these same leaders contributed directly to the creation and development of the BCL, the Barbados Labour Party, and Barbados Workers' Union.

Wickham founded and edited The Outlook: A Monthly Magazine and Review, known for his radical political views expressed primarily in his previous weekly Herald. It was not a true literary magazine since its focus was more ideological and political but the magazine considered the development of creative writing priority: "If we have any particular aspiration," he wrote, "The Outlook may be the means of developing literary talent by providing opportunity" (October 1931). The magazine included short fiction, book reviews, and a sprinkling of poems in all its issues, along with its staples of political and social commentary. Its reviews of texts such as George S. Schuyler's Black No More (1931) were evidence of the linkages between the Harlem Renaissance and the West Indian awakening that would become even more pronounced in The Forum Quarterly. Unfortunately, The Outlook floundered by 1932 after only six issues. In its brief tenure, the journal served as a new avenue for literary expression, promoting language as a tool of resistance and cultural redefinition.

In a manner that was revolutionary and unprecedented for the times, another short-lived journal published between 1931 and 1934, The Forum Quarterly envisaged its role as supplementing the work of other publications, such as the Herald newspaper edited by Wickham and Clement Inniss. Former Principal of UWI, Keith Hunte wrote: "The Herald provided a medium through which its editor, Clennell Wickham, poured trenchant criticism on the political behaviour of the local oligarchy and called attention to social ills that needed to be remedied." The journal's further definition of its mission in The Literary Outlook, in the March 1932, recognized the potential of the synergies between literature and other publications of social discourse exploited chiefly by Clennell and Inniss, and O'Neale, with whom they had established the Democratic League in 1924:

"By hammering out a common language of the spirit we create a new kind of inter-colonial interest, and in accepting the fact that there lies about us material as artistic as any we know at only second or third hand, we emphasize West Indian consciousness. Indeed, this literary activity is only a reflection of a new activity in the social and political spheres."

Barbados in the 1920s and 1930s was that liberalism was not rooted there. Were there any Liberals with whom Adams, at the time a stalwart supporter of the plantocracy Wickham opposed, could ally? Wickham demolished that idea in a devastating piece published in the Barbados Herald of 25 July 1925.

When writing in January 1935, Wickham saw the need for mobilization of the workers as the basis for the democratic movement. A bill had been introduced every election campaign since August 1930 in the Assembly aimed at lowering the income qualification for a franchise but was thrown out by the Legislative Council. Not until an identical bill was introduced in the House in 1936 was it successfully moved and seconded by Chrissie Brathwaite; still, it failed:

"Till the working class is organized to provide the guts for the democratic movement political and social conditions will be what they are."

Prior to the 1937 riots, the white planter and merchant were dominant in the Barbados Houses of the Legislature. But political activity in the working class was beginning to grow, under leaders such as Wickham, Inniss, and O'Neale. As a result of this rioting the Labour leaders of the time - Grant, Skeete, Lovell and Alleyne - were given heavy prison sentences for sedition, and one leader, Clement Osbourne Payne, was deported.

Clennell Wickham died in Grenada in 1938, aged 43.

Barbara Wickham, his surviving younger sister (1999), related how on his return to Barbados he had been asked to vacate a church pew reserved for whites. Clennell stormed from the church, never to return. Gilbert Grindle, Assistant Under-Secretary at the Colonial Office in London, wrote that "the black man has come to think and feel of himself as good as the white".

His son, John Wickham, followed in the footsteps of his father and became literary editor of The Nation, one of the leading newspapers in Barbados. He had a career in the World Meteorological Organization, which took him to Europe for several years, and served for many years as the editor for the literary quarterly magazine BIM. His short stories have been widely anthologized. Among his collections are Casuarina Row (1974) and Discoveries (1993). He also co-edited The Oxford Book of Caribbean Short Stories. Now an award in non-fiction prose, named after him, The John Wickham Scholarship, is presented each year to an individual who uses language to inspire, entertain and educate.

The Dictionary of Caribbean English Usage was unveiled at the association's Clennell Wickham Memorial Lecture in 1996 by the Barbados Association of Journalists.

Since November 2009, Clennell's grandchildren Fran Wickham and Peter W. Wickham (himself also a political journalist/commentator) now present the "Karin Dear’s Hall of Fame" award to deserving journalists at a ceremony held annually in Barbados.

"Regrettably I have to confirm that for the first time since my Grandfather Clennell Wickham started writing People and Things in the 1940s, this article has been unilaterally suspended by the Newspaper that agreed to host it. Clearly, my perspective on this occasion is very different to that which I offered during the 1999 and 2003 elections. I am therefore grateful to BU and to BFP for carrying this review of the politics of inclusion which is yet to see the light of day".

- writes journalist Peter W. Wickham (31 December 2007)

Rawdon J. H. Adams, son of Tom Adams and grandson of Grantley Adams, in a lecture in March 2010 said of Clennell:

"When my Grandfather returned to Barbados from Oxford in 1925 he was quickly marked as a man of argument – opposing for opposing’s sake as his critics might have said. There were his battles with Clennell Wickham and the Democratic League of Dr Charles Duncan O’Neal for which he was cast as a supporter of the status quo. Then came his attacks on the same status quo, the plantocracy, in the House of Assembly in 1934 one consequence of which was the near ruin of his legal practice."

== Bibliography ==
- Wickham, Clennell Wilsden (1995). A Man with a Fountain Pen, Bridgetown, Barbados: Nation Publishers pp. 23 [ca]. (Descriptive: "Barbados. Pen and ink sketches and other essays of Barbadian politicians; published originally in the Barbados Herald in 1921. Edited by John Wickham)
- Wickham, Clennell Wilsden (1921). Pen Portraits by a Gentleman with a Fountain Pen, Bridgetown, Barbados: Herald.
