= Sonia Browne =

Barbadian politician

Dr Sonia Browne MP

Minister of State for Health and Wellness
- In office January 2022 – January 2024
- Prime Minister: Mia Mottley

Member of Parliament
- Incumbent
- Assumed office 2018
- Succeeded by: Davidson Ishmael
- Constituency: Saint Philip North

Sonia Browne is a Barbadian politician and physician who has been a member of parliament for Saint Philip North in the House of Assembly since 2018. She also served in government as a Minister of State for Health and Wellness from January 2022 to January 2024.

== Political career ==
Before entering politics, Browne worked as a general practitioner. In the 2018 Barbadian general election, Browne stood as a Barbados Labour Party (BLP) candidate for the Saint Philip North constituency, with BLP leader Mia Mottley claiming during the election campaign that Browne’s political candidacy had caused her to lose patients. Browne was elected as the member of parliament (MP) for Saint Philip North with a majority of 1,598 votes, unseating incumbent Democratic Labour Party MP Michael Lashley. Following the election, she was appointed as the new parliament's Chairman of Committees.

Browne was re-elected to the House of Assembly of Barbados in the 2022 general election with a reduced majority of 235 votes. Following the 2022 election, she was appointed by the prime minister, Mia Mottley, to serve as a Minister of State in the Ministry of Health and Wellness with responsibility for the Queen Elizabeth Hospital and non-communicable diseases.

In January 2024, Browne resigned from the position and returned to the backbenches, citing recent “personal and professional matters”. She was succeeded by Davidson Ishmael. However, she was made the Government’s Wellness Champion. In the 2026 general election, Browne was re-elected with a majority of 306 votes.
