= Billie Miller =

Barbadian politician

The Right Honourable Dame Billie Miller DA OCC

6th Deputy Prime Minister of Barbados
- In office 12 September 1994 – 21 May 2003
- Prime Minister: Owen Arthur
- Preceded by: Philip Greaves
- Succeeded by: Mia Mottley

Personal details
- Born: 8 January 1944 (age 82) British Windward Islands (now Barbados)

Dame Billie Antoinette Miller, DA, OCC (born 8 January 1944) is a Barbadian politician who served as Deputy Prime Minister from 1994 to 2003. Miller is a member of the Barbados Labour Party (BLP).

== Early life and education ==
Billie Miller's father, the late Frederick Edward Miller, was himself a parliamentarian of distinction, holding the Ministerial portfolios of Health and Social Services from 1956 to 1961, while her mother Mildred Miriam (née Lashley) was a nurse.

Miller was educated at Queen's College in Barbados, King's College, Durham University, and the Council of Legal Education in England.

== Career and politics ==
She was called to the Bar of England and Wales in 1968 and to the Bar of Barbados in 1969, becoming the island's first woman barrister. She was a practising attorney from 1969 to 1976 and 1987–1994. She was appointed Deputy Prime Minister and Minister of Foreign Affairs in 1994 within the government of Prime Minister Owen Arthur, and was also charged with the responsibility of Leader of the House of Assembly and MP for the constituency of the City of Bridgetown. She later gave up that post during a cabinet reshuffle after the 2003 elections, in which the BLP maintained power. In 1999 she has also headed the Ministry of Foreign Trade.

Miller began her political career in 1976 when she was elected Member of Parliament for the City of Bridgetown in a by-election. A few months later, she fought and won her seat again in the General Elections. She served as Minister of Health and National Insurance from 1976 to 1981 and was the first female to sit in the Cabinet of Barbados. Re-elected to Parliament in 1981, she was appointed Minister of Education with the Culture portfolio being added in 1985.

Following the 1986 General Elections when the Barbados Labour Party lost at the polls, she was appointed to the Senate where she served as Leader of Opposition Business. She was again elected Member for the City of Bridgetown in the General Elections of 1991, and served as Deputy Leader of the Opposition from 1993 to 1994. In September 1994, when the Barbados Labour Party was returned to government, Miller was re-elected as the member for the City of Bridgetown for the fourth time.

== Roles and responsibilities ==
Very active in the civic and non-governmental arena, she has been Chairperson (the first woman) of the Executive of the Commonwealth Parliamentary Association, and of the Inter-American Development Bank’s Women in Development Unit; President of the International Planned Parenthood Federation/Western Hemisphere Region; Vice–President of the Inter-American Parliamentary Group on Population and Development and President of the African, Caribbean and Pacific States Council of Ministers. She was also a member of the International Planned Parenthood Federation/Central Council and the UN Population Fund’s Advisory Panel of Activities Concerning Women.

Miller served as Chairperson of the NGO Planning Committee of the International Conference on Population and Development held in Cairo, in Egypt in 1994. She has also served as Secretary-Treasurer of the Barbados Bar Association; Legal Adviser to Women in Action; and as a member of the Board of Directors of Life of Barbados Ltd; the Planned Parenthood Federation of America Inc.; Inter-American Dialogue; and on the Board of Trustees Of International Commentary Service.

She was a member of both the International Federation of Women Lawyers from 1975–1976 and the Commonwealth Human Rights Initiative’s Advisor Group during 1990–1992.

She was the Chairperson of the Association of Caribbean States’ Ministerial Council; President of the Board of Directors of the Inter-American Parliamentary Group on Population and Development for the Caribbean and Latin-America; Chairperson of the Inter-American Development Bank’s Advisory Council on Women in Development; and vice-chairperson of the Commonwealth Ministerial Action Group.

== Awards ==
Dame Billie Miller was awarded the Queen's Silver Jubilee Medal in 1977.

She was appointed Grand Officer of the National Order of Benin on 23 June 2000, for her contribution to the negotiations that led to the new Partnership Agreement between Europe and the African, Caribbean and Pacific Group of States. She is also a member of Washington D.C.–based think tank the Inter-American Dialogue.

She is also the recipient of the Barbados Centennial Award 2000, when Miller was conferred the highest honour in Barbados; she was also made a Dame of St. Andrew (DA) of the Order of Barbados in 2003.

On 26 June 2001, she was awarded the Grand Cross of the National Order of Juan Mora Fernandez by the Government of Costa Rica.

Her recreational activities include reading, interior design and Ikebana (the Japanese art of flower arranging).

It was widely believed that Miller would eventually succeed Owen Arthur as leader of the BLP, but Mottley succeeded Arthur as BLP leader in January 2008 after the party was voted out of power.

In 2022, she was awarded the Order of the Caribbean Community, the highest awarded that can be conferred on a Caribbean national.

== See also ==
- List of the first women holders of political offices in North America

Parliament of Barbados
Preceded by Ernest Deighton Mottley	Member of Parliament for City of B'town; 1976–2008	Succeeded by Patrick Martin Tyrone Todd
Political offices
Preceded by Branford Taitt	Foreign Minister of Barbados; 1994–2008	Succeeded by Christopher Sinckler
