= Electoral and Boundaries Commission (Barbados) =

Electoral commission in Barbados

Agency overview
- Formed: 1985
- Preceding agency: The Electoral Department (Preceded itself by the Office of the Chief Registering Officer)
- Jurisdiction: Government of Barbados
- Headquarters: Warrens Tower II, Warrens, St. Michael, Barbados
- Motto: Free and Fair
- Agency executives: Leslie Haynes, Chairman; Angela Taylor, Chief electoral officer; Ian Browne, Deputy chief electoral officer
- Website: https://www.electoral.barbados.gov.bb/

The Electoral and Boundaries Commission is the independent non-partisan department responsible for administering all elections in Barbados. It is also responsible for maintaining the registry of all citizens and non-national residents within the country and the issuing of national identity cards. It was established in 1985 after an amendment to the Constitution of Barbados under Section 41A.

== History ==
The Electoral and Boundaries commission traces its origins back to the establishment of the Office of the Chief Registering Officer in the 1960s by the colonial government when Barbados was a colony in the British Empire to conduct local and national elections. In 1969, the first national identification cards were issued for the 1969 City of Bridgetown by-election, after a survey was conducted in 1966, and issued for the rest of the country later that year in September. In 1971, the Electoral department was established under the newly created position of the Chief Electoral Officer. The entire identification system was later computerized in 1979 with the assistance of the Processing and Statistical Service Departments.

The modern Electoral and Boundaries commission was then established in 1985 after the constitution of Barbados was amended for its creation and replaced the Electoral Department. Its first election supervised was the 1985 St. Thomas by-election and it has handled elections and the process of registering and distributing national identification cards ever since.

== Functions ==
The commission is responsible for:

1. The registration of voters and the conduct of elections in every constituency or any matter that is incidental to or consequential upon either.
2. Reviewing the number and boundaries of the constituencies into which Barbados is divided and making recommendations to the Prime Minister.

The commission is also governed by the laws of the Representation of the People Act, Chapter 12, Representation of the People (General Elections) Allocation of Broadcasting Time Regulations, 1990, People (Registration of Electors) Regulations, 1990 and the Elections Offences and Controversies Rules, 1959, all which outline the legal conduct of elections for the media, electorate and the candidates.

== Structure and Governance ==
In accordance to the constitution, the commission consists of at least a chairman, a deputy chairman and 3 other members as stipulated:

(2) The Commission shall consist of a chairman, a deputy chairman and three other members. (3) The chairman and two other members of the Commission shall be appointed by the Governor-General, acting on them recommendation of the Prime Minister after consultation with the Leader of the Opposition, by instrument under the Public Seal, and the deputy chairman and one other member shall be appointed by the Governor-General, acting on the recommendation of the Leader of the Opposition after consultation with the Prime Minister, by instrument under the Public Seal.

The commission also hires the necessary amount of staff to execute its duties in accordance to the constitution as well. It employs a Chief Electoral officer, a deputy chief electoral officer, 30 registering officers to reflect the amount of constituencies in the country, a senior photographer for identity cards and ion cards and other administrative staff.

=== List of Chairmen ===
- Kenrick Jordan 1985 – 1990
- Asquith Phillips 1990 – 1995
- Milton Pierce 1995 – 2000
- Philip Serrao 2000 – 2010
- Owen L. Estwick 2010 – 2015
- John Haynes 2015 – 2020
- Leslie Haynes 2020–present

=== List of Chief Electoral Officers ===
As part of the Electoral Department

- Dennis Smith 1971 – 1985

As part of the Electoral and Boundaries Commission

- Dennis Smith 1985 – 1991
- Edwin Stroude 1992 – 1994
- Mersada Elcock 1994 – 1996
- Hensley Robinson 1996 – 2001
- Godfrey Hinds 2001 – 2002
- Angela Taylor 2005–present

==== List of Deputy Chief Electoral Officers ====
- Mersada Elcock 1987 – 1994
- Hensley Robinson 1994 – 1996
- Andrew Jones 1996 – 1998
- Donville Johnson 1998 – 2006
- Arthur Holder 2003 – 2004
- Ian Browne 2004–present

== See also ==
- Election commission
- Parliament of Barbados
- List of parliamentary constituencies of Barbados
