= 1969 City of Bridgetown by-election =

Parliamentary by-election in Barbados in 1969

- 29 May 1969
- Turnout: 56.1%

| Candidate | Elliot Mottley | Millar |
| Party | BLP | DLP |
| Popular vote | 1,698 | 1,135 |
| Percentage | 57.48% | 27.05% |
MP before election
Louis Lynch
BNP
Elected MP
Elliot Mottley
BLP

A by-election was held in the Barbadian constituency of the city of Bridgetown on 29 May 1969 after the death of Barbados National Party member Louis Lynch who was the representative of the constituency in the House of Assembly of Barbados. It was the first election held after Barbados gained independence from the British Empire in 1966.

== Previous election ==
1966 general election: City of Bridgetown
| Candidate | Party | Votes | % |
|---|---|---|---|
| Ernest Mottley | Barbados National Party | 2,268 | 31.47 |
| Louis Lynch | Barbados National Party | 1,680 | 23.31 |
| R.B. Caddle | Democratic Labour Party | 1,546 | 21.45 |
| T.N. Miller | Democratic Labour Party | 1,296 | 17.98 |
| C.T. Trotman | Barbados Labour Party | 417 | 5.79 |
| Total | | 7,207 | 100.00 |
| Valid votes | | 7,207 | 99.82 |
| Invalid/blank votes | | 13 | 0.18 |
| Total votes | | 7,220 | 100.00 |
| Registered voters/turnout | | 4,788 | 150.79 |
Source: Caribbean Elections

== Result ==
Elliot Mottley won the election. Turnout was 56.1%.

| Candidate | Party | Votes | % |
|---|---|---|---|
| Elliot Mottley | Barbados Labour Party | 1,698 | 57.48 |
| Millar | Democratic Labour Party | 1,135 | 38.42 |
| George Batson | Independent | 57 | 1.93 |
| Glenroy Straughn | Independent | 33 | 1.12 |
| Carl Haddock | Independent | 23 | 0.78 |
| Eric Sealy | Independent | 8 | 0.27 |
| Total | | 2,954 | 100.00 |
| Valid votes | | 2,954 | 99.33 |
| Invalid/blank votes | | 20 | 0.67 |
| Total votes | | 2,974 | 100.00 |
| Registered voters/turnout | | 5,297 | 56.14 |
| BLP gain from BNP | | | |
Source: Caribbean Elections

== See also ==
- 1966 Barbadian general election
- List of parliamentary constituencies of Barbados
