= 1976 Barbadian by-elections =

Parliamentary by-election in Barbados in 1976

- 1976 St. Philip North constituency by-election
- 26 February 1976

Candidate	David Simmons	Warwick Franklin
Party	BLP	DLP
Popular vote	1,835	1,662
Percentage	49.51%	44.84%
MP before election
Neville Maxwell
DLP
Elected MP
David Simmons
BLP
- 1976 City of Bridgetown constituency by-election
- 12 May 1976

Candidate	Billie Miller	Lisle Carmichael
Party	BLP	DLP
Popular vote	1,872	1,318
Percentage	56.88%	40.05%
MP before election
Elliot Mottley
BLP
Elected MP
Billie Miller
BLP

By-elections were held in the Barbadian constituencies of St. Philip North and the city of Bridgetown on 26 February 1976 and 12 May 1976 respectively. Both elections were triggered based on the resignations of House of Assembly representatives Elliot Mottley (representing of the City of Bridgetown) and Neville Maxwell (representing St. Philip North). It was the first by-election held under the new single-member first-past-the-post system.

== Previous election ==
General election 1971: St. Philip North
Candidate	Party	Votes	%
Neville Maxwell	Democratic Labour Party	2,831	80.56
David Simmons	Barbados Labour Party	683	19.44
Total		3,514	100.00
Valid votes		3,514	98.24
Invalid/blank votes		63	1.76
Total votes		3,577	100.00
Registered voters/turnout		4,164	85.90
Source: Caribbean Elections

General election 1971: City of Bridgetown
Candidate	Party	Votes	%
Elliot Mottley	Barbados Labour Party	1,977	52.69
Lisle Carmichael	Democratic Labour Party	1,775	47.31
Total		3,752	100.00
Valid votes		3,752	98.84
Invalid/blank votes		44	1.16
Total votes		3,796	100.00
Registered voters/turnout		5,188	73.17
Source: Caribbean Elections

== Result ==
Billie Miller won the Bridgetown election and David Simmons won the St. Philip North election.

1976 St. Philip North By-Election
Candidate	Party	Votes	%
David Simmons	Barbados Labour Party	1,835	49.51
Warwick Franklin	Democratic Labour Party	1,662	44.85
Maurice Mason	Independent	179	4.83
Evans Webster	Independent	30	0.81
Total		3,706	100.00
Valid votes		3,706	98.93
Invalid/blank votes		40	1.07
Total votes		3,746	100.00
Registered voters/turnout		4,889	76.62
BLP gain from DLP			
Source: Caribbean Elections

1976 City of Bridgetown By-Election
Candidate	Party	Votes	%
Billie Miller	Barbados Labour Party	1,872	56.88
Lisle Carmichael	Democratic Labour Party	1,318	40.05
Carl Moore	People's Political Alliance	56	1.70
Al Gilkes	Independent	30	0.91
Callie Mottley	Independent	15	0.46
Total		3,291	100.00
Valid votes		3,291	95.25
Invalid/blank votes		164	4.75
Total votes		3,455	100.00
Registered voters/turnout		5,692	60.70
BLP hold			
Source: Caribbean Elections

== See also ==
- 1971 Barbadian general election
- List of parliamentary constituencies of Barbados
