= 1958 Barbadian by-elections =

Parliamentary by-election in Barbados in 1958

- 21 May 1958
- 1958 St. Joseph constituency by-election

Candidate	Glenroy Straughn	Wilfred Coward	Joseph N.T. Kellman
Party	BLP	DLP	Independent
Popular vote	1,112	926	249
Percentage	46.88%	39.04%	10.50%
MP before election
Grantley Adams
BLP
Elected MP
Glenroy Straughn
BLP
- 1958 St. John constituency by-election
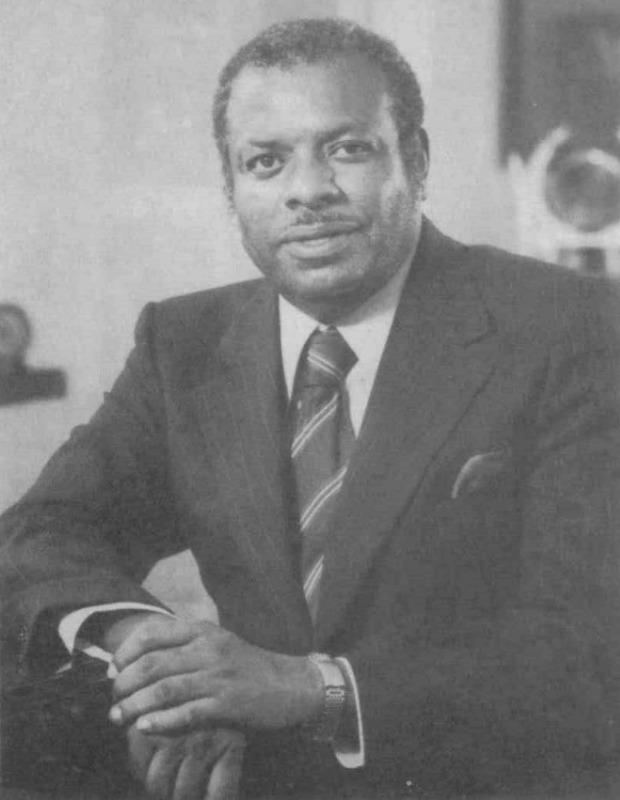

Candidate	Errol Barrow	Owen T. Allder	John W.B. Chenery
Party	DLP	BLP	Independent
Popular vote	1,430	873	554
Percentage	50.05%	30.55%	19.39%
MP before election
Victor Vaughn
BLP
Elected MP
Errol Barrow
DLP

By-elections were held in the Barbadian constituencies of St Joseph and St John on 21 May 1958.

== Previous election ==
=== St Joseph ===
General election 1956: St Joseph
Candidate	Party	Votes	%
Grantley Adams	Barbados Labour Party	2,166	43.79
Lloyd Smith	Barbados Labour Party	2,046	41.37
Joseph N.T. Kellman	Progressive Conservative Party	388	7.84
L.L. Gill	Progressive Conservative Party	346	7.00
Total		4,946	100.00
Valid votes		2,664	98.92
Invalid/blank votes		29	1.08
Total votes		2,693	100.00
Registered voters/turnout		3,808	70.72
Source: Caribbean Elections

=== St John ===
General election 1956: St. John
Candidate	Party	Votes	%
L. Thorne	Barbados Labour Party	1,332	23.35
Victor Vaughan	Barbados Labour Party	1,275	22.35
C.A. Speede	Democratic Labour Party	977	17.13
O.T. Allder	People's Progressive Movement	965	16.92
J.S.B. Dear	Progressive Conservative Party	608	10.66
E.McG. Webster	Independent	193	3.38
S. Linton	People's Progressive Movement	140	2.45
G.W. Maynard	Independent	94	1.65
J.A.LeV. Wilson	Independent	66	1.16
A.H.A. Lewis	Democratic Labour Party	54	0.95
Total		5,704	100.00
Valid votes		3,571	99.06
Invalid/blank votes		34	0.94
Total votes		3,605	100.00
Registered voters/turnout		5,155	69.93
Source: Caribbean Elections

== Results ==
Glenroy Straughn won the St Joseph election and Errol Barrow won the St. John election. The St. John constituency would become a DLP stronghold and not elect a non-DLP candidate until the 2018 general elections sixty years later.

=== St Joseph ===
1958 St. Joseph by-election
Candidate	Party	Votes	%
Glenroy Straughn	Barbados Labour Party	1,112	46.88
Wilfred Coward	Democratic Labour Party	926	39.04
Joseph N.T. Kellman	Independent	249	10.50
Louis A. Vaughn	Independent	85	3.58
Total		2,372	100.00
Valid votes		2,372	95.15
Invalid/blank votes		121	4.85
Total votes		2,493	100.00
Registered voters/turnout		4,107	60.70
BLP hold			
Source: Caribbean Elections

=== St John ===
1958 St. John by-election
Candidate	Party	Votes	%
Errol Barrow	Democratic Labour Party	1,430	50.05
Owen T. Allder	Barbados Labour Party	873	30.56
John W.B. Chenery	Independent	554	19.39
Total		2,857	100.00
Valid votes		2,857	98.65
Invalid/blank votes		39	1.35
Total votes		2,896	100.00
Registered voters/turnout		5,059	57.24
DLP gain from Barbados Labour Party			
Source: Caribbean Elections

== See also ==
- 1956 Barbadian general election
- List of parliamentary constituencies of Barbados
