= Michael Lashley =

Barbadian politician

Member of the House of Assembly of Barbados for City of Bridgetown
- Incumbent
- Assumed office 11 February 2026
- Prime Minister: Mia Mottley
- Preceded by: Corey Lane

Personal details
- Party: Barbados Labour Party (since 2025)
- Other political affiliations: Democratic Labour Party (until 2025)

Michael Lashley is a Barbadian politician from the Barbados Labour Party (BLP).

== Political career ==
Lashley is an attorney-at-law by profession. He was previously minister of transport. He joined the Democratic Labour Party in 1986, and served as MP for Saint Philip North.

In 2025, he joined the Barbados Labour Party. In the 2026 Barbadian general election, was elected in City of Bridgetown succeeding Corey Lane. Following the election, Prime Minister Mia Mottley appointed him Minister of Legal Affairs and Criminal Justice.
