= Tyra Trotman =

Barbadian politician

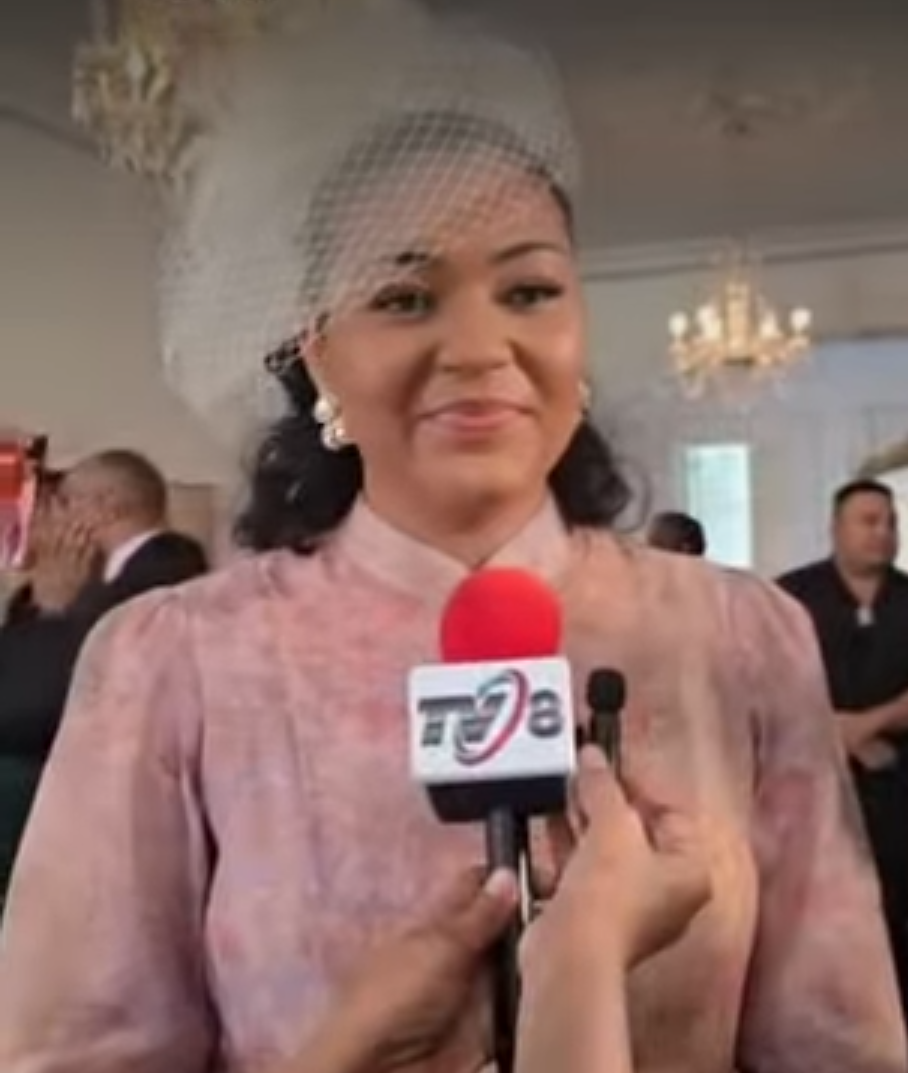
- In a 2026 interview

Member of the House of Assembly of Barbados for Saint Michael Central
- Incumbent
- Assumed office 11 February 2026
- Preceded by: Arthur Holder

Personal details
- Party: Barbados Labour Party (since November 2024)
- Other political affiliations: Democratic Labour Party (until 2024)
- Website: https://trotman-law.com/about-us

Tyra Trotman is a Barbadian politician from the Barbados Labour Party (BLP).

== Political career ==
In September 2024, she resigned from the Democratic Labour Party (DLP) and joined the Barbados Labour Party in November 2024. In the February 2026 Barbadian general election, she was elected in Saint Michael Central succeeding Arthur Holder.
