= Chamberlain Bridge =

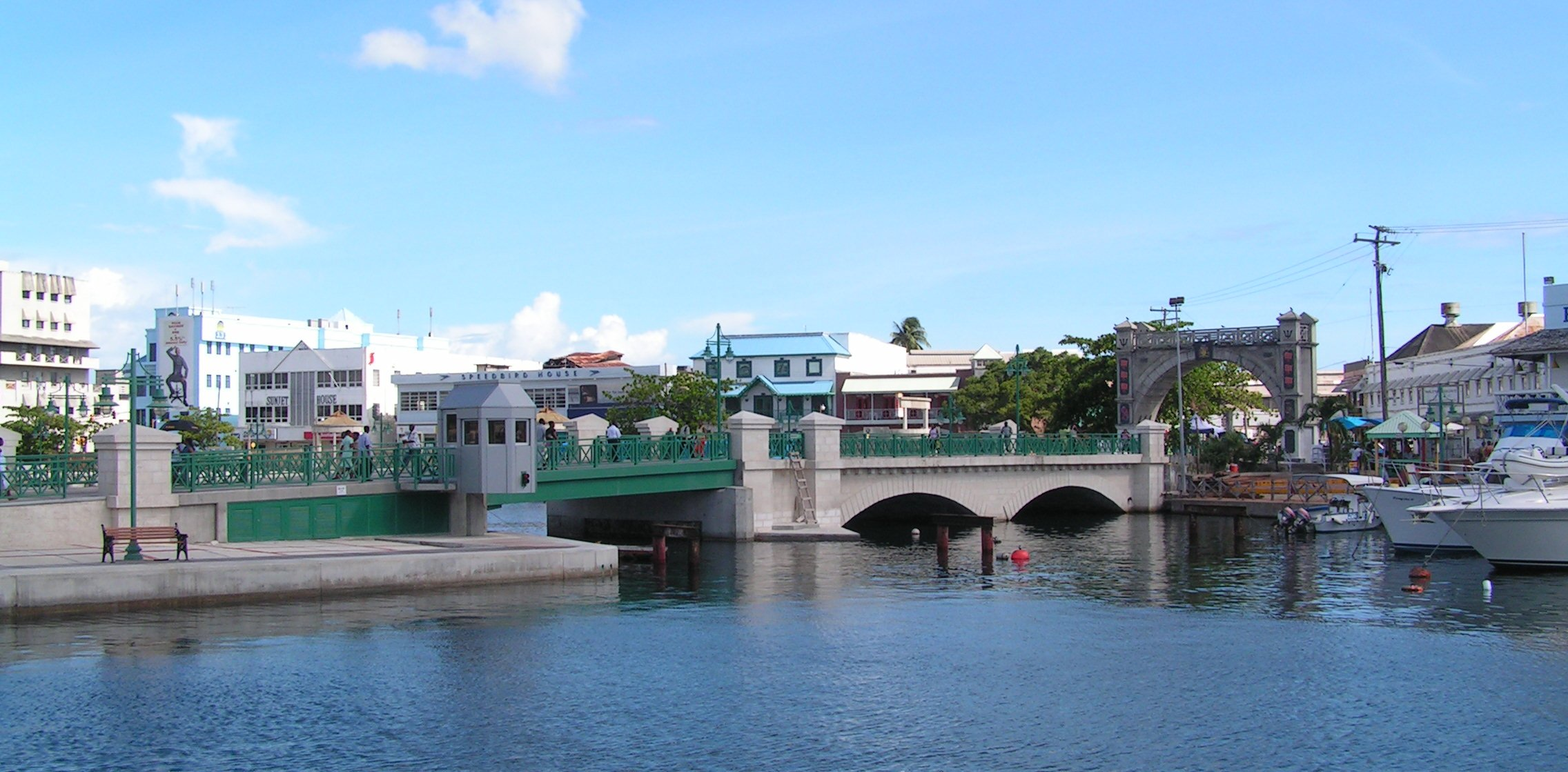
- Chamberlain Bridge, Bridgetown
- Coordinates: 13.0961°N 59.6141°W
- Carries: pedestrians, bicycles
- Crosses: Constitution River; Careenage River
- Locale: Barbados
- Official name: The Chamberlain Bridge; The Swing Bridge.
- Other name: Originally named as the Indian Bridge
- Maintained by: Government of Barbados

Characteristics
- Design: Former: Swing bridge Current: Single-leaf bascule-type drawbridge
- Total length: 11.72 metres (38.5 ft)
- Width: 8.86 metres (29.1 ft)
- Longest span: Single span of 11.7 metres (38 ft)

History
- Opened: Originally built in 1872 and rebuilt in 2005–2006

Statistics
- Toll: N/A

Location
- Interactive map of Chamberlain Bridge

The Chamberlain Bridge is a bridge in Bridgetown, the capital and largest city of the nation of Barbados. In 1872, it was a swing bridge across the marine inlet channel of the inner basin of the Careenage (Constitution River) at Carlisle Bay. The outmoded steel structure was dismantled and rebuilt in 2005–2006 as a lifting bridge with the state-of the-art modern technology of an all-composite single-leaf bascule design. This design is a counterweighted bridge span that pivots upward, permitting pleasure craft to pass through an inlet channel. The bridge was built using fibre-reinforced plastic (FRP), which is lighter, long lasting and non-corrosive.

There are two bridges in use in Bridgetown. The Charles Duncan O'Neal Bridge is large and modern in design, commencing from the street east of National Heroes Square, while Chamberlain Bridge is the more "decorative humpbacked bridge" built to replace the original swing bridge after the Great Hurricane with funds generated through the efforts of the then British Colonial Secretary, Joseph Chamberlain (1836–1914).

== Etymology ==
The swing bridge replaced an old wooden bridge named “Indian Bridge,” which ushered development through the movement of small boats into the inner basin of the Careenage River. The bridge was later renamed after Joseph Chamberlain, who, as the British Colonial Secretary in the 1890s, was instrumental in shielding the West Indian sugar industry against stiff competition from Europe. He is also credited with allocation of large funds as grants and loans to subsist the economy of Barbados.

The town was officially known as the "town of St. Michael", but was later renamed as Bridgetown after the bridge. Indeed, the town was known as Indian Bridgetown or Indian Town for some time after this bridge.

== History ==
The history of this bridge is recorded by Warren Alleyne in his book Historic Bridgetown. According to Alleyne, a primitive bridge, built by the indigenous Arawak, was replaced in 1628 by the Wolverstone settlers. It was rebuilt in 1654 after its condition deteriorated. Subsequently, fires gutted the bridge and it had to be rebuilt again in 1668. The problem was compounded by a hurricane in 1675 and again in 1677. This constant disruption caused inconvenience to traffic and prompted the authorities to build another bridge. The second bridge was built by levying a tax on the slaves. By 1681, Bridgetown had two bridges: the west bridge, which was built at the same location as the Indian Bridge (the present lift bridge), and the east bridge, built at the present site of the O'Neal Bridge.

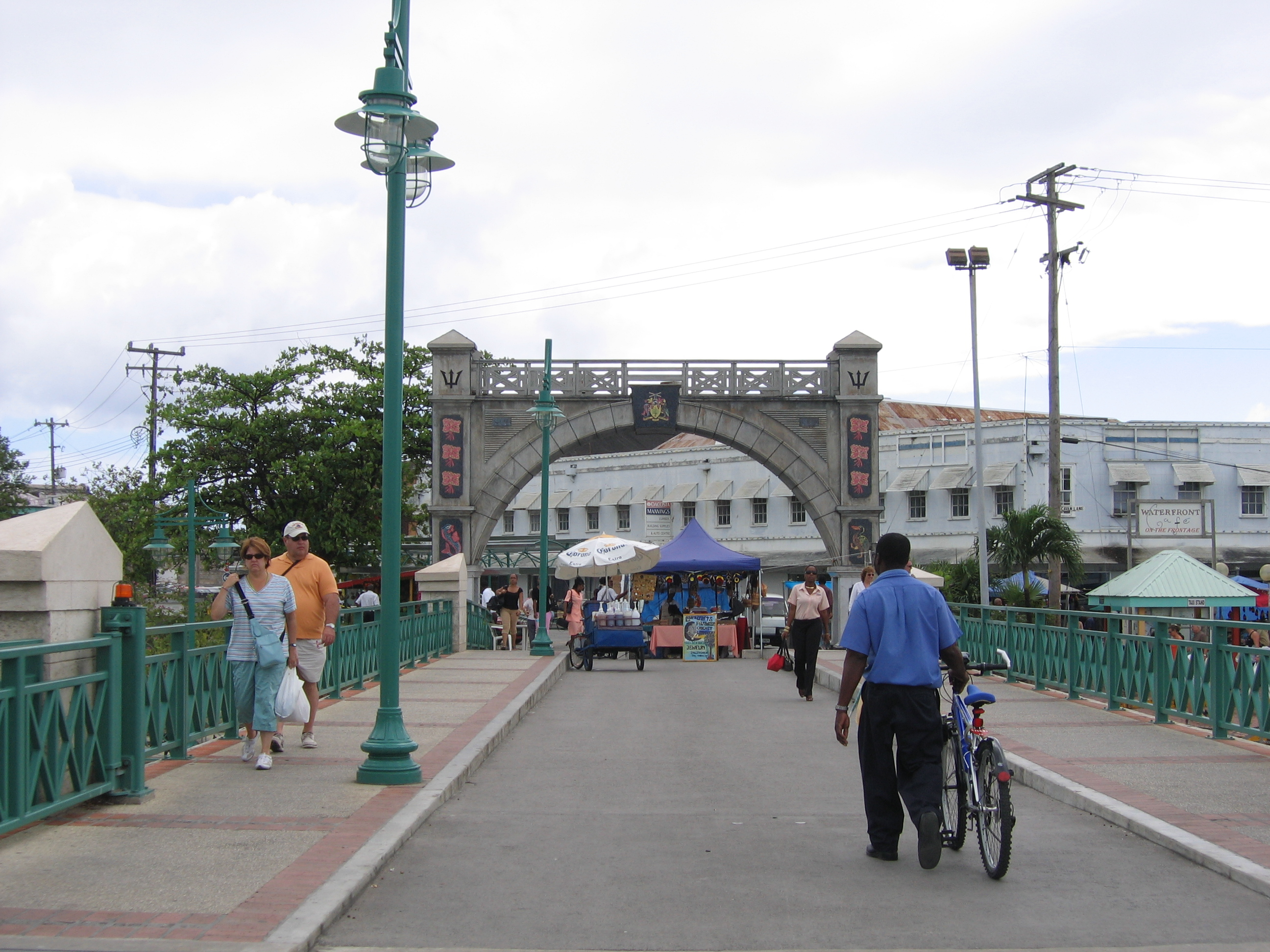
The Commemorative Independence Arch

18th century

Floods in 1700 destroyed the west bridge, resulting in only one bridge remaining as a link between the two banks of the river. Fifty years later, in 1751, the second bridge was rebuilt but it also ended in disaster due to poor construction, which necessitated the authorities to prosecute the builders. This was followed by a bridge constructed in 1760 for pedestrians only.

19th century

In 1862, when Trafalgar Square (later renamed National Heroes Square) was gutted, a rebuilding exercise of the entire complex resulted in planning for a swing bridge also. Construction for the swing bridge started in 1865 but had to be dismantled as it did not conform to the approved design. This was followed by shipping over the metalwork manufactured in London in transportable sections, and assembling on site from both ends of the structure. This exercise also ended in controversy, as both ends could not be joined due to a gap. Eventually, the bridge was completed at a cost of 18,000 pounds which was then stated to be "a total mismanagement of public funds". The bridge was formally commissioned on April 18, 1872. A hurricane struck it in 1898, causing severe damage to the structure. It was refurbished with funds granted by the British Government under Joseph Chamberlain, the then Secretary of State for the Colonies.

20th century

It was re-commissioned on December 14, 1900, by Lady Hay, wife of Sir James Shaw Hay, then Governor of Barbados. The bridge was also named in honour of the Secretary of State for the Colonies, as the "Chamberlain Bridge". It functioned until 1984, when it was declared unfit for traffic and it gradually deteriorated.

"Oh Chamberlain! You deserve to rest now
And view all sorts of cargo passing by
In this temporal grove, the Careenage
Of still waters ‘neath arched extremities
With trade from Caricom communities;
As pleasure crafts sail with the cool sea breeze
For you give them shelter from angry seas.

To your north stand political towers,
The Cathedral and the heroes in the Square,
Your frame preserved the tracks, stains and bruises
Caused by every thing flowing over you;
Some have mishandled you and raped you too;
Yet your NISE arms swung with pride and beauty;
Your rest deserved; you have done your duty.

Oh Bridge of fragile frame you have reached now
One hundred and thirty-three years this fall.
With Indians' feathered quills they wrote ’bout
The blood, the sweat and tears of by-gone slaves,
Your blows from hurricanes and killer waves,
Yet your timbered heart did find common ground
With Wolferstone, and Chamberlain, profound!"

— Three stanzas of Paterika Hengreaves's poem on the dismantling of Chamberlain Bridge in 2005.

A commemorative arch commemorating the 21st anniversary of Barbados Independence was built in 1987 at the southern end of the bridge. This reduced the available width for the new swing bridge.

21st century

In 2005, it was decided to replace the old swing bridge with modern state-of-the art bridge technology. A plan was made to build the modern lifting bridge. It included dismantling the old swing bridge to make way for the new bridge, which was completed in 2006. The new lift bridge stretches from National Heroes Square to the other bank, permitting seagoing ships to dock in the inner basin of the river in the rebuilt Careenage.

== Geography ==
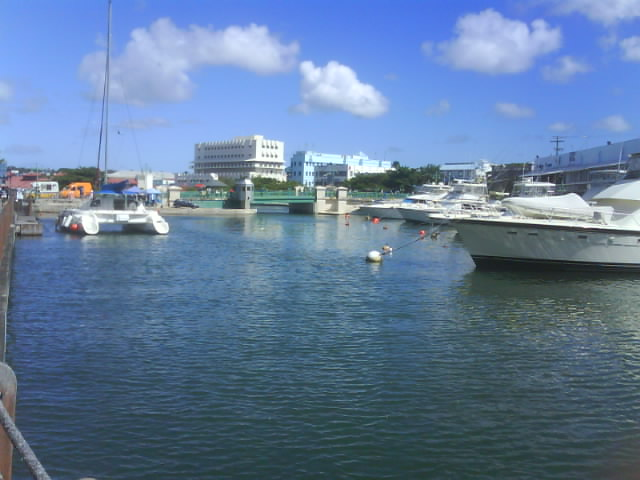
The Carineege (outer basin) named by the "Bajans" as Constitution River

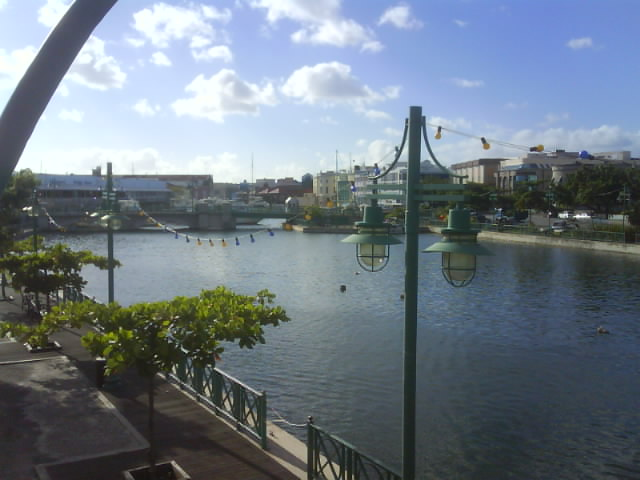
Inner basin of the Constitution River

The Arawak Indians, the original inhabitants of Barbados, built a wooden bridge, the Arawak Indian bridge, across the inlet channel named the Constitution River or the Careenage River. Later, this part of the city became the waterfront where fishing and other commercial boats operated. Careenage inlet takes its name from the process of careening, in which weight would be tied to a ship’s mast to upturn it, exposing the hull so that it could be cleaned and painted. However, a deep-water harbour replaced the original harbour. It is inferred that the draw bridge, which was constructed in 1872, was also built at the same location as the Arawak Indian bridge.

The Constitution River is an arm of the bay where the Careenage marina was developed for ships to berth. The Careenege marina was the hub of all mercantile activity of Bridgetown till the new harbour at Bridgetown was built. Of the two bridges built across this river, the Chamberlain Bridge was built as a draw bridge to allow large ships to cruise through the inlet and its name is in honour of the Colonial Secretary who helped Barbados with financial assistance after the 1898 hurricane.

While the importance of the Careenage River channel and the draw bridge across it was the nucleus of activity for inter-island trading vessels, its current use is mostly for operation of recreational crafts such as catamarans, yachts, fishing boats and so forth. Today, the bridge is used for pedestrians only and the boardwalk attached to the bridge stretches over the length of the wharf and used by pedestrians to get fine vistas of the town.

== Structure ==
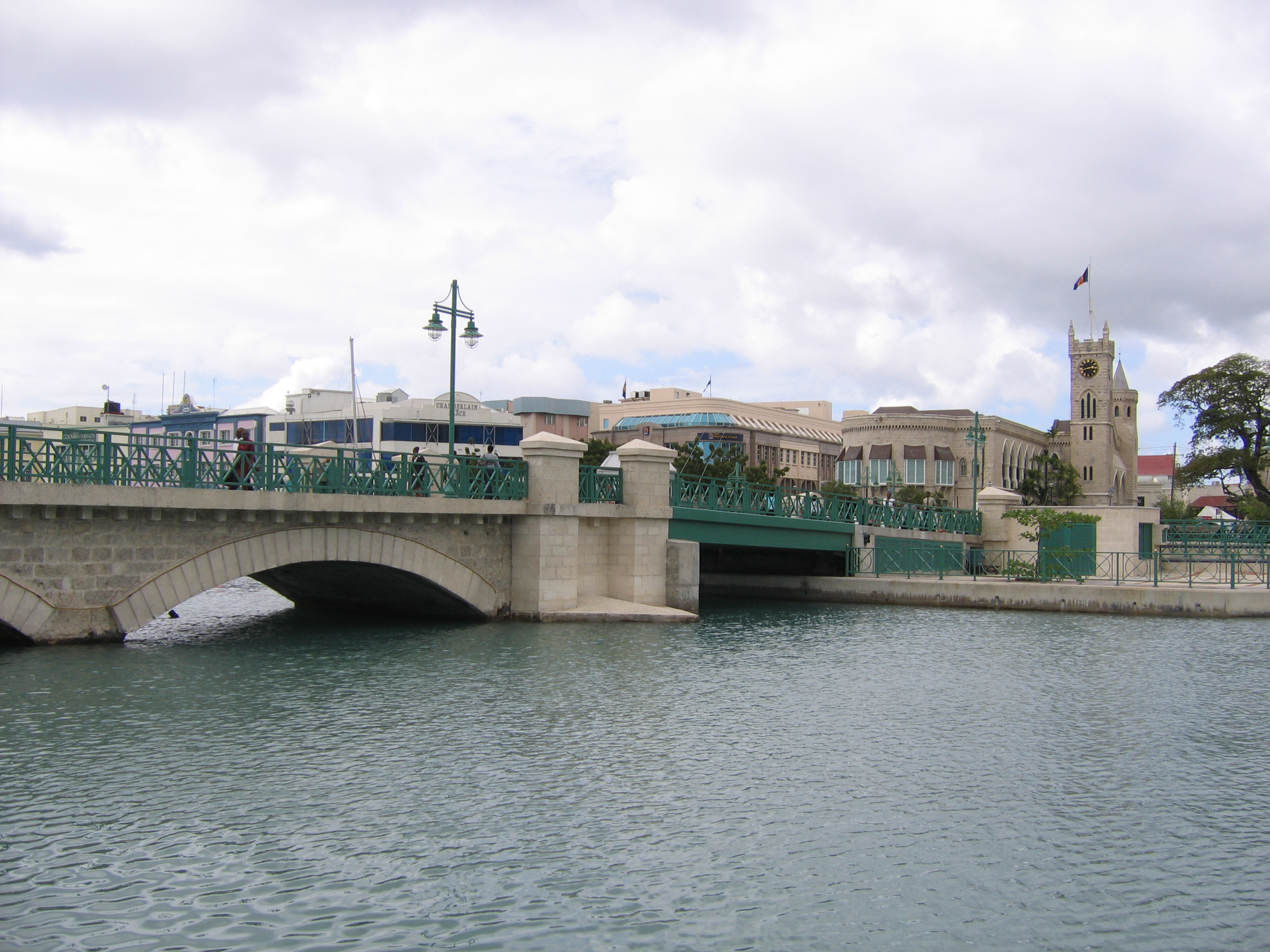
The stone arch bridge and the modern bascule-type lift bridge

The lift bridge was designed by Faber Maunsell to replace the bridge built in 1872. Several designs were considered. Finally, a unique design using fibre-reinforced plastic (FRP) composite known as the "space age material" was chosen. The basic composition of FRP is an engineered polymer or plastic with glass reinforcement with supplements of additives and core materials. The lightweight FRP material was found not only economical and strong but also durable, non-corrosive lightweight to suit the corrodible marine environment. It was designed to carry 7.5 tonne vehicular load with pedestrian loading. The lift bridge was designed as an all-composite double-leaf bascule bridge with custom design adopting “Strongwell's Composolite building panel system, Strongwell EXTREN structural shapes and a custom, heavy-duty building panel.” EXTREN square tubes of different sizes provided the attractive architectural railing on the sides.

The bridge was built in 2005–2006. The engineer in charge of implementation was Kandiah Kuhendran, with builder Richard Edghill. The bridge measures 8.86 metres (29.1 ft) in width and of single span of 11.72 metres (38.5 ft) length and is about 1 metre (3 ft 3 in) deep. It was manufactured in four segments and assembled at site with “adhesive and Composolite toggles and 3-way connector.” Edghill, who built this bridge, said that "It's probably one of the first in the world using that material, for a national lift bridge." The FRP composite is a technology provides, a lighter and stronger structure with long life. The lift bridge as built is contiguous to the two old stone arches, which have been refurbished adding to the aesthetics of the bridge which have also been now provided with night lighting arrangements making the bridge locale an attractive scenic place to visit. The two span coral stone masonry arch structure dating from 1861 adjoins the lift bridge. The bridge has a plaque of the Barbadian National Anthem.
