= 2001 St. Thomas by-election =

Parliamentary by-election in Barbados in 2001

- 21 September 2001
- Turnout: 63.72%
Candidate	Cynthia Forde	George Pilgrim
Party	BLP	DLP
Popular vote	3,662	1,740
Percentage	67.79%	32.21%
MP before election
David Simmons
BLP
Elected MP
Cynthia Forde
BLP

A by-election was held in the Barbadian constituency of the St. Thomas on 21 September 2001 after the resignation of Barbados Labour Party member David Simmons who was the representative of the constituency in the House of Assembly of Barbados. It was first election in the country that took place in the 21st century.

== Previous election ==
1999 general election: St. Thomas
Candidate	Party	Votes	%
David Simmons	Barbados Labour Party	3,687	76.19
George Pilgrim	Democratic Labour Party	1,152	23.81
Total		4,839	100.00
Valid votes		4,839	99.51
Invalid/blank votes		24	0.49
Total votes		4,863	100.00
Registered voters/turnout		7,877	61.74
Source: Caribbean Elections, Electoral and Boundaries Commission

== Results ==
Cynthia Forde won the election. Turnout was 64%.

Candidate	Party	Votes	%
Cynthia Forde	Barbados Labour Party	3,662	67.79
George Pilgrim	Democratic Labour Party	1,740	32.21
Total		5,402	100.00
Valid votes		5,402	99.41
Invalid/blank votes		32	0.59
Total votes		5,434	100.00
Registered voters/turnout		8,528	63.72
BLP hold			
Source: Caribbean Elections, Electoral and Boundaries Commission

== See also ==
- 1999 Barbadian general election
- List of parliamentary constituencies of Barbados
