= Corey Lane =

Barbadian politician

Member of the House of Assembly of Barbados for City of Bridgetown
- In office 2018 – 11 February 2026
- Prime Minister: Mia Mottley
- Succeeded by: Michael Lashley

Personal details
- Party: Barbados Labour Party

Corey A. Lane is a Barbadian politician from the Barbados Labour Party.

== Political career ==
Lane was the member of the House of Assembly for the City of Bridgetown constituency. Before being elected to parliament he was special advisor to the prime minister on poverty alleviation and the sustainable development goals. In the Cabinet of Barbados, Lane served as minister of state in the Office of the Attorney General.
