= Saint Michael Central (Barbados Parliament constituency) =

Parliamentary constituency in Barbados

- Constituency for the House of Assembly of Barbados
- Region: Saint Michael, Barbados

Current constituency
- Created: 1971

Saint Michael Central is a constituency in the Saint Michael parish of Barbados. It was established in 1971. Since 2026, it has been represented in the House of Assembly of the Barbadian Parliament by Tyra Trotman, a member of the BLP. (Note: As with all constituencies, the constituency elects one member of parliament (MP) by the first past the post system of election at least every five years.) The Saint Michael Central constituency is a safe seat for the BLP.

== Boundaries ==
The constituency runs:

From the junction of Eagle Hall and Bank Hall Cross Road with Tudor Bridge, along the middle of Tudor Bridge to its junction with Accommodation Road; thence in a south easterly, then easterly and south easterly direction along the middle of Accommodation Road to its junction with 2nd Avenue Promenade Road; thence in a south westerly direction along the middle of 2nd Avenue Promenade Road to its junction with Military Road; thence in a south easterly direction along the middle of Military Road to its junction with Highway 2 (Bank Hall Main Road); thence in a north easterly direction along the middle of Highway 2 to its junction with Waterford Cross Road; thence in an easterly direction along the middle of Waterford Cross Road to its junction with Highway 3 (the Hindsbury-Waterford Road); thence in a straight line drawn in the direction of the junction of Highway 4 (the BridgetownBulkeley Road) with the Belle Road to the point at which that straight line is crossed by the watercourse running between the Belle Pumping Station in a south easterly direction between Flint Hall and Licorish Village to a point east of Welches Service Station on Highway 4; thence in a westerly direction along the middle of Highway 4 to its junction with Bridge Road; thence along the middle of Bridge Road to its junction with Bank Hall Cross Road; thence in a north westerly to westerly direction along the middle of Bank Hall Cross Road to its junction with Eagle Hall and Tudor Bridge (the starting point).

== Members ==
Election	Member	Party
2018	Arthur Holder	BLP
2022	Arthur Holder	BLP
2026	Tyra Trotman	BLP

== Elections ==
=== 2026 ===
Candidate	Party	Votes	%	+/–
Tyra Trotman	Barbados Labour Party	1,962	73.59	
Andre Worrell	Democratic Labour Party	464	17.40	
Raymond Wiggins	Friends of Democracy	168	6.30	New
Anthony Hinds	People's Coalition for Progress	72	2.70	New
Total		2,666	100.00	–
Barbados Labour Party hold				

=== 2022 ===
St. Michael Central
Party	Candidate	Votes	%	±%
BLP	Arthur Holder	2,014	67.8	−5.8
DLP	Courie Cox	670	22.6	0.0
APP	Joseph Atherley	267	9.0	+7.3
SB	Robert Toussaint	18	0.6	−0.9
Majority		1,344	45.3	−5.7
Turnout		2,969		
BLP hold		Swing	-2.9	

=== 2018 ===
St. Michael Central
Party	Candidate	Votes	%	±%
BLP	Arthur Holder	2,948	73.6	+24.1
DLP	Steven Blackett	905	22.6	−27.9
UPP	Richard Barrow	69	1.7	new
SB	Robert Toussaint	62	1.5	new
Barbados Integrity Movement	Glenville Evelyn	20	0.5	new
Majority		2,043	51.0	+50.1
Turnout		4,004		
BLP gain from DLP		Swing	+26.0	
