= Gregory Nicholls =

Barbadian politician

Member of the House of Assembly of Barbados for Saint Thomas
- Incumbent
- Assumed office 11 February 2026
- Preceded by: Cynthia Y. Forde

Member of the Senate of Barbados
- In office 2022–2026
- Prime Minister: Mia Mottley

Personal details
- Party: Barbados Labour Party

Gregory Nicholls is a Barbadian politician from the Barbados Labour Party (BLP).

== Political career ==
Nicholls is an attorney-at-law by profession. In the 2026 Barbadian general election, was elected in Saint Thomas succeeding Cynthia Y. Forde.
