= Cynthia Y. Forde =

Barbados-born politician

- Born: March 1, 1952 (age 74)
- Education: Erdiston Teacher Training College; Licentiate College of Preceptors
- Occupation: School teacher/Politician
- Political party: Barbados Labour Party
- Opponents: Rolerick Hinds and George Pilgrim (Democratic Labour Party)

Cynthia Yvonne Forde ("Cinthy") is a Barbadian born veteran politician who was one of the longest serving Members of Parliament. She was the Member of Parliament for the central constituency of Saint Thomas for 25 years as well as a former Cabinet minister and former Deputy Speaker of the House of Assembly.

== Biography ==
Cynthia Yvonne Forde born and raised in the rural parish of St. Thomas. Forde studied at the Modern High School, Erdiston Teacher Training College and Licentiate College of Preceptors.She has also done studies at the Barbados Institute of Management and Productivity and in Industrial Relations in Washington, D.C.

Cynthia Forde is considered one of Barbados veteran politicians. Her work experience started as a cashier for one year at Woolworth, then for 25 years she taught at The Sharon Primary School, located in St.Thomas. Forde is the current Member of Parliament for St. Thomas, she has served the constituency as MP for over 24 years. She has held number of important and top positions in government including Senator, Parliamentary Secretary, Minister of State and Cabinet Minister. She was Parliamentary Sectary and Minister of State in the Ministry of Education, Youth Affairs and Culture (1994-2001), later she won the St. Thomas by-election and became Minister of State in the Ministry of Education, Youth Affairs and Sport

In 2018 when the Barbados Labour Party was elected Forde was appointed as Minister of People Empowerment and Elder Affairs. After The Barbados Labour Party was re-elected in 2022 Forde declined to serve in the Cabinet again. In the 2018 election she received the 2nd highest of votes from the electorate in Barbados's history that being over 5,000 votes.

Forde has also served various top positions in the Barbados Labour Party such as General Sectary, 1st Vice Chairman, 2nd Vice Chairman and 3rd Vice Chairman. Apart from serving in government and party positions Forde was the former President of the Association of Friends of the Gordon Cummins District Hospital, former Executive Member of the Barbados Union of Teachers(BUT), former member of the Community Independence Celebration Committee, former member of Sharon Primary Parent-Teacher Association, former President of the Alleyne School Parent Teacher Association and a long standing member of the Holy Innocents Anglican Church Council - A Representative of the Anglican Church just to name a few. Forde was made Deputy Speaker of The House Assembly in January, 2024 and resigned in mid 2025.

In the 2026 Barbadian general election, she was succeeded as MP for Saint Thomas by senator Gregory Nicholls.

=== Family ===
Forde is the mother of one son and grandmother of four grandchildren.
