= 1954 St. Lucy by-election =

Parliamentary by-election in Barbados in 1954

- 29 November 1954
- Turnout: 72.98%

Candidate	James Cameron Tudor	Garner	Greaves
Party	BLP	Independent	Independent
Popular vote	1,518	767	551
Percentage	53.53%	27.05%	19.43%
MP before election
L.A. Williams
BLP
Elected MP
James Cameron Tudor
BLP

A by-election was held in the Barbadian constituency of St Lucy on 29 November 1954.

== Previous election ==
1951 general election: St Lucy
Candidate	Party	Votes	%
John Branker	Barbados Labour Party	1,686	37.00
L.A. Williams	Barbados Labour Party	1,315	28.86
E.L Ward	Barbados Electors Association	1,119	24.56
S.A. Walcott	Barbados Electors Association	264	5.79
I.C. Sobers	Independent	173	3.80
Total		4,557	100.00
Valid votes		2,979	99.13
Invalid/blank votes		26	0.87
Total votes		3,005	100.00
Registered voters/turnout		3,925	76.56
Source: Caribbean Elections

== Result ==
James Cameron Tudor won the election. Turnout was 73%.

Candidate	Party	Votes	%
James Cameron Tudor	Barbados Labour Party	1,518	53.53
Garner	Independent	767	27.05
Greaves	Independent	551	19.43
Total		2,836	100.00
Valid votes		2,836	98.06
Invalid/blank votes		56	1.94
Total votes		2,892	100.00
Registered voters/turnout		3,963	72.98
BLP hold			
Source: Caribbean Elections

== See also ==
- 1951 Barbadian general election
- List of parliamentary constituencies of Barbados
