= 1970 St. Joseph by-election =

Parliamentary by-election in Barbados in 1970

- 3 December 1970
- Turnout: 69.3%

| Candidate | Charles Lindsey Bolden | Lloyd Smith |
| Party | BLP | DLP |
| Popular vote | 1,950 | 1,218 |
| Percentage | 61.55% | 38.45% |
MP before election
Grantley Adams
BLP
Elected MP
Charles Lindsey Bolden
BLP

A by-election was held in the Barbadian constituency of the St Joseph on 3 December 1970 after the resignation of Barbados Labour Party member Grantley Adams who was the representative of the constituency in the House of Assembly of Barbados.

== Previous election ==
1966 general election: St Joseph
| Candidate | Party | Votes | % |
|---|---|---|---|
| Lloyd Smith | Barbados Labour Party | 2,233 | 37.27 |
| Grantley Adams | Barbados Labour Party | 2,027 | 33.83 |
| Wilfred Coward | Democratic Labour Party | 1,029 | 17.18 |
| R.B. Noel | Democratic Labour Party | 702 | 11.72 |
| Total | | 5,991 | 100.00 |
| Valid votes | | 5,991 | 100.00 |
| Invalid/blank votes | | 0 | 0.00 |
| Total votes | | 5,991 | 100.00 |
| Registered voters/turnout | | 3,553 | 168.62 |
Source: Caribbean Elections

== Result ==
Charles Lindsey Bolden won the election. Turnout was 69.3%.

| Candidate | Party | Votes | % |
|---|---|---|---|
| Charles Lindsey Bolden | Barbados Labour Party | 1,950 | 61.55 |
| Lloyd Smith | Democratic Labour Party | 1,218 | 38.45 |
| Total | | 3,168 | 100.00 |
| Valid votes | | 3,168 | 98.57 |
| Invalid/blank votes | | 46 | 1.43 |
| Total votes | | 3,214 | 100.00 |
| Registered voters/turnout | | 4,640 | 69.27 |
| BLP hold | | | |
Source: Caribbean Elections

== See also ==
- 1966 Barbadian general election
- List of parliamentary constituencies of Barbados
