= 1984 St. Peter by-election =

Parliamentary by-election in Barbados in 1984

- 19 July 1984 (annulled); 22 November 1984 (re-run)
- Turnout: 78.7%
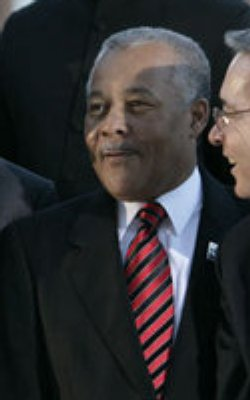

Candidate	Owen Arthur	Sybil Leacock
Party	BLP	DLP
Popular vote	3,145	2,907
Percentage	51.83%	47.91%
MP before election
Walter Hinds
BLP
Elected MP
Owen Arthur
BLP

A by-election was held in the Barbadian constituency of the St. Peter on 19 July 1984, and then again on 22 November 1984, after the resignation of Barbados Labour Party member Walter Hinds who was the representative of the constituency in the House of Assembly of Barbados.

The election is notable for being held a second time after the result of the first election was declared null and void by the Supreme Court of Barbados, following BLP candidate Owen Arthur appealing the outcome, due to numerous errors made by election officials. While Democratic Labour Party member Sybil Leacock was declared the winner by one vote in the first election, after the second election, Arthur was declared the winner instead. It is the only time since independence that an election result was overturned.

== Previous election ==
1981 general election: Saint Peter
Candidate	Party	Votes	%
Walter Hinds	Barbados Labour Party	2,637	51.85
Sybil Leacock	Democratic Labour Party	2,307	45.36
Everton Green	Independent	106	2.08
Anthony Wiggens	Independent	36	0.71
Total		5,086	100.00
Valid votes		5,086	99.32
Invalid/blank votes		35	0.68
Total votes		5,121	100.00
Registered voters/turnout		6,796	75.35
Source: Caribbean Elections, Barbados Electoral and Boundaries Commission

== Results ==
The initial result on 19 July 1984 was victory for Sybil Leacock who won by a single-vote margin over Owen Arthur with voter turnout of 74.2%. However, after an appeal was launched by Arthur in the election court, the Supreme Court declared the result invalid due to errors made by the election officials. A redo of the election was held on 22 November 1984 where Arthur won the by election with an increased voter turnout of 78.7%.

19 July 1984 By Election for the constituency of Saint Peter (Result overturned by Supreme Court)
Candidate	Party	Votes	%
Sybil Leacock	Democratic Labour Party	2,765	49.29
Owen Arthur	Barbados Labour Party	2,764	49.27
Glenroy Straughn	Independent	32	0.57
Martin Cadogan	Independent	29	0.52
Everton Greene	Independent	20	0.36
Total		5,610	100.00
Valid votes		5,610	99.34
Invalid/blank votes		37	0.66
Total votes		5,647	100.00
Registered voters/turnout		7,613	74.18
Source: Caribbean Elections, Barbados Electoral and Boundaries Commission

22 November 1984 By Election for the constituency of Saint Peter
Candidate	Party	Votes	%
Owen Arthur	Barbados Labour Party	3,145	51.59
Sybil Leacock	Democratic Labour Party	2,907	47.69
Martin Cadogan	Independent	24	0.39
Everton Greene	Independent	20	0.33
Total		6,096	100.00
Valid votes		6,076	99.69
Invalid/blank votes		19	0.31
Total votes		6,095	100.00
Registered voters/turnout		7,745	78.70
BLP hold			
Source: Caribbean Elections, Barbados Electoral and Boundaries Commission

== See also ==
- 1981 Barbadian general election
- List of parliamentary constituencies of Barbados
