= Charles Duncan O'Neal Bridge =

Bridge in Bridgetown, Barbados

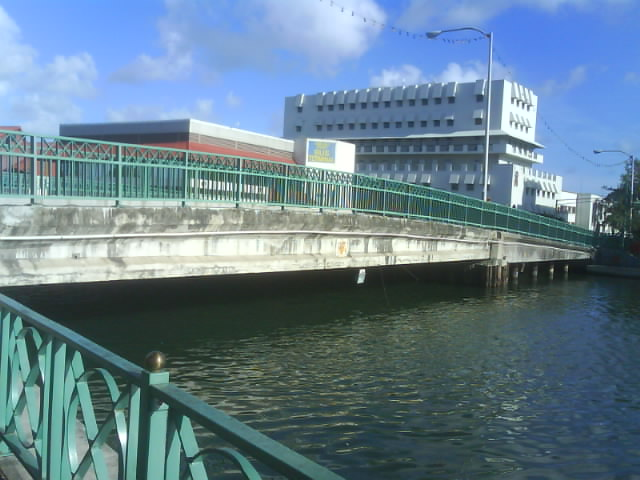
The Bridge

Charles Duncan O'Neal Bridge is a bridge in Bridgetown, Barbados. It is one of two bridges over the Careenage, the other being the Chamberlain Bridge, although unlike the Charles Duncan Bridge it does not take traffic. It is named after Charles Duncan O'Neal who founded the radical Democratic League in 1924. Since 2013, the bridge has been featured on the reverse of the $10 Barbadian dollar bill.
