= 1985 St. Thomas by-election =

Parliamentary by-election in Barbados in 1985

- 23 May 1985
- Turnout: 73.5%
Candidate	David Simmons	Ronald Rock
Party	BLP	DLP
Popular vote	3,036	2,533
Percentage	54.52%	45.48%
MP before election
Tom Adams
BLP
Elected MP
David Simmons
BLP

A by-election was held in the Barbadian constituency of the St. Thomas on 23 May 1985 after the death of the second prime minister of Barbados Tom Adams. He was a Barbados Labour Party member and the representative of the constituency in the House of Assembly of Barbados.

== Previous election ==
1981 general election: Saint Thomas
Candidate	Party	Votes	%
Tom Adams	Barbados Labour Party	3,328	66.72
Neville Boxill	Democratic Labour Party	1,660	33.28
Total		4,988	100.00
Valid votes		4,988	99.05
Invalid/blank votes		48	0.95
Total votes		5,036	100.00
Registered voters/turnout		6,658	75.64
Source: Caribbean Elections, Barbados Electoral and Boundaries Commission

== Results ==
David Simmons won the election. Turnout was 73.5%.

Candidate	Party	Votes	%
David Simmons	Barbados Labour Party	3,036	54.52
Ronald Rock	Democratic Labour Party	2,533	45.48
Total		5,569	100.00
Valid votes		5,569	99.36
Invalid/blank votes		36	0.64
Total votes		5,605	100.00
Registered voters/turnout		7,618	73.58
BLP hold			
Source: Caribbean Elections

== See also ==
- 1981 Barbadian general election
- List of parliamentary constituencies of Barbados
- List of heads of state and government who died in office
