= Joes River =

River in Barbados

- Location of mouth

Location
- Country: Barbados
- Parish: Saint Joseph, Barbados

Physical characteristics
- Mouth: Atlantic Ocean
  - coordinates: 13°13′02″N 59°31′37″W
  - elevation: Sea level

The Joes River is a river of Barbados.

== See also ==
- List of rivers of Barbados
