= Arthur Holder =

Barbadian politician

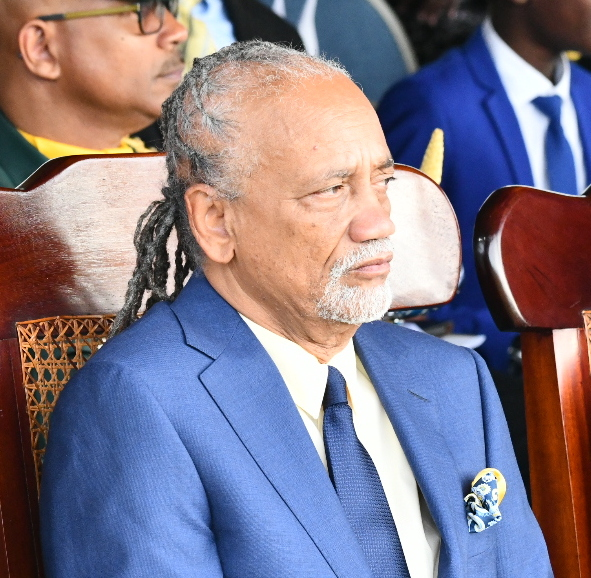

Speaker of the House of Assembly of Barbados
- Incumbent
- Assumed office 5 June 2018
- Preceded by: Michael A. Carrington

Member of the House of Assembly of Barbados for Saint Michael Central
- In office 2018–2026
- Succeeded by: Tyra Trotman

Personal details
- Born: Arthur Eugene Holder Waterford, St. Michael, Barbados
- Party: Barbados Labour Party
- Occupation: Lawyer, Politician

Arthur Eugene Holder (born Waterford, St. Michael) is a Barbadian politician and lawyer. He was a member of the House of Assembly of Barbados. Holder became the Speaker of the House of Assembly of Barbados on 5 June 2018.

== Early life and career ==
Arthur Eugene Holder was born in Waterford, Saint Michael. He attended the University of the West Indies and had his post-graduate at the Barry University, Miami.

Holder was the senior advocate at Holder and company. He was the Manager of the Barbados Child Care Board and the programme officer with the National Council on Substance Abuse. In 2013, Holder contested for the Barbados House of Assembly and lost. In 2018, he ran again for office and won. He was elected member of the Barbados House of Assembly in 2018. Immediately after being elected he was appointed the Speaker of the Barbados House of Assembly.

He did not run for the 2026 Barbadian general election, and was succeeded by Tyra Trotman in his constituency. He was later re-elected as the first independently elected Speaker of the House of Assembly.

He is a member of the Barbados Labour Party.
