= David Simmons (judge) =

Barbadian jurist (born 1940)

Sir David Anthony Cathcart Simmons (born April 28, 1940) is a Caribbean jurist and politician: a former Chief Justice of Barbados, he also served as Attorney General.

== Early life and education ==
David Simmons was born in Saint Philip, Barbados, to Kenneth and Sybil Simmons. The eldest of five children, Sir David has three brothers and one sister. His godparents were Sir Hugh Springer and Dr Hugh Gordon Cummins. He was educated at the Wesley Hall Boys' School, St Philip's Boys' School, and The Lodge School and then attended university in London, studying at the London School of Economics 1960–1965, graduating as Master of Laws (LL.M.) and being called to the bar at Lincoln's Inn. While in London, Simmons also reported as a journalist on the 1966 Barbados Independence Conference.

== Legal career ==
Simmons returned to Barbados and joined the chambers of Sir Henry Forde, becoming a Queen's Counsel after 14 years of practice, a record time in Barbados. He also lectured in law at the University of the West Indies, Cave Hill.

== Political career ==
Simmons became active in the Barbados Labour Party. In 1971, he stood unsuccessfully in the St. Philip North seat, before winning it in a by-election in 1976. He served as the House of Assembly member for St. Thomas from 1985 until his retirement in 2001, including three terms as Attorney General of Barbados.

== Later career and honours ==
Simmons was made a Knight of St Andrew (Order of Barbados) in November 2001.

On 1 January 2002, he became Chief Justice of Barbados. He is a Member of The Regional Judicial and Legal Services Commission of the Caribbean Court of Justice and Chairman of the Turks and Caicos Integrity Commission.

He has also served as chairman of a number of national and international judicial bodies:

- Chairman of the Caribbean Financial Action Task Force (1997/98);
- Chairman of the EU/Caribbean Conference which developed the "Barbados Plan of Action" (1996);
- Chairman of the Joint US/Caribbean Sub-Committee which developed a Plan of Action on Justice and Security issues, signed by President Clinton and Caribbean Heads (1997);
- Chairman of the Regional Committee for the establishment of a Maritime Cooperation Against the Traffic in Illicit Narcotic Drugs in the Caribbean project (1999–2002);
- Chairman of the Preparatory Committee to establish the Caribbean Court of Justice (1999–2001); first Chairman of the Regional Judicial and Legal Services Commission (2003–2004);
- Chairman of the High Level Task Force to supervise the inauguration of the Caribbean Court of Justice (2004–2005).

In 2006, Simmons was elected as an Honorary Bencher of the Honorable Society of Lincoln's Inn.

Simmons chaired the 2013 CONCACAF investigation which found FIFA Vice President Jack Warner guilty of corruption.

In 2013, he was appointed Chairman of the Tivoli Inquiry into the violence surrounding the 2010 arrest of Christopher Coke.

== Personal life ==
Sir David married Marie McCormack, later Madam Justice McCormack (the first woman to be appointed a Judge of the Supreme Court of Barbados); they have two children.

His personal interests include calypso music and cricket.
