= List of rivers of Barbados =

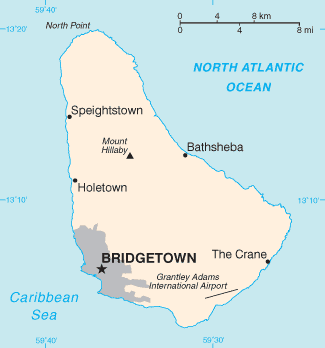
Map of Barbados

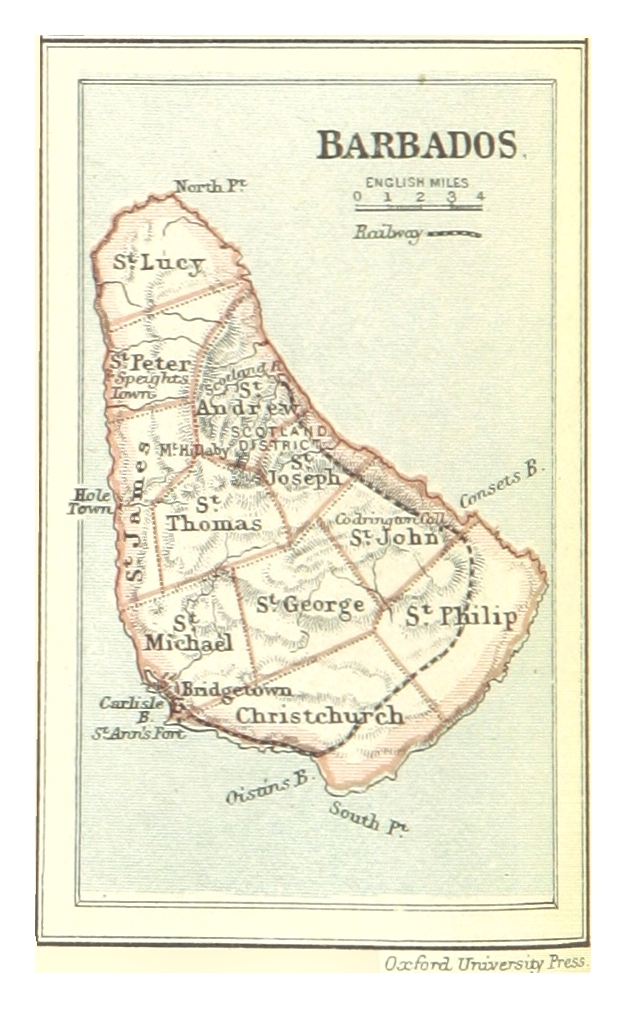
Parishes of Barbados

Barbados is an island country in the Lesser Antilles of the West Indies, in the Caribbean region of North America. It is 34 kilometres (21 miles) in length and up to 23 km (14 mi) in width, covering an area of 432 km^{2} (167 sq mi). It is situated in the western area of the North Atlantic and 100 km (62 mi) east of the Windward Islands and the Caribbean Sea; therein, Barbados is east of the Windwards, part of the Lesser Antilles, roughly at 13°N of the equator. It is about 168 km (104 mi) east of both the countries of Saint Lucia and Saint Vincent and the Grenadines and 180 km (110 mi) south-east of Martinique and 400 km (250 mi) north-east of Trinidad and Tobago. Its capital and largest city is Bridgetown.

== Atlantic Ocean ==
The following rivers in Barbados flow to the Atlantic Ocean.

- Bruce Vale River, mouth: Saint Andrew Parish, 13°14′59″N 59°33′29″W
- Joes River, mouth Saint Joseph Parish, 13°13′00″N 59°32′00″W
- Long Pond River, mouth: Saint Andrew, 13°15′06″N 59°33′20″W

== Caribbean Sea ==
The following rivers in Barbados flow to the Caribbean Sea.

- Constitution River, mouth: Saint Michael Parish, 13°05′44″N 59°37′03″W
- Indian River, mouth: Saint Michael, 13°06′38″N 59°37′35″W

== See also ==
- List of rivers of the Americas by coastline
