= Charles Duncan O'Neal =

Barbadian politician (1879–1936)

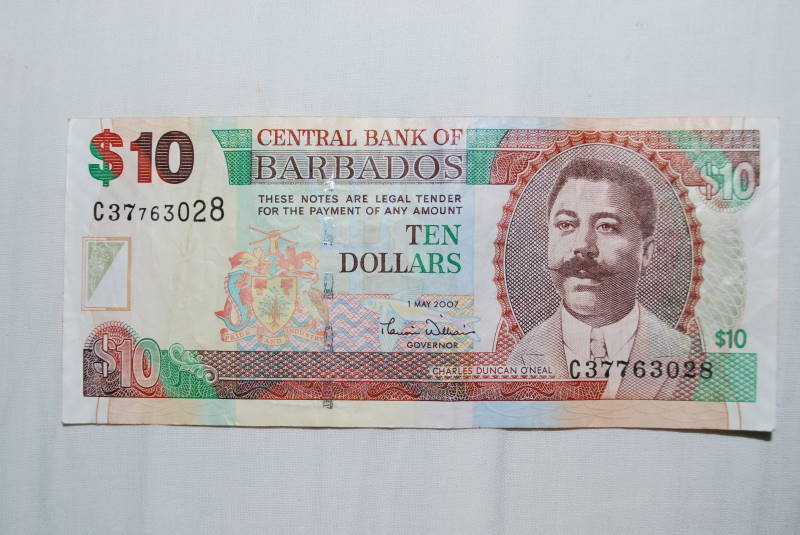
Charles Duncan O'Neal on the $10 Barbados banknote

Charles Duncan O'Neal (30 November 1879 – 19 November 1936) was a Barbadian physician, politician and workers' rights activist. He founded the radical Democratic League in 1924 and influenced the shift towards party-focused politics still seen in Barbados to the present day.

== Early life ==
O'Neal was born in Saint Lucy, Barbados, to Joseph O’Neal and Kathleen O’Neal (formerly Pinnie Kathleen Prescod). His father was a blacksmith turned shopkeeper. O’Neal studied at Harrison College, and in 1899 went to study medicine at the University of Edinburgh, graduating with an MBChB on 23 July 1904.

== Political career ==
While still at university, O’Neal became an active member of Keir Hardie's Independent Labour Party. After his graduation, he served on the County Council of Sunderland, where he was influenced by his surgical work with coal miners and workers in Newcastle.

When O’Neal returned to Barbados, progressive forces had already begun to agitate for greater rights for the labouring underclass against what had continued to be a plantocratic government. He founded the Democratic League in 1924, along with Clennell Wickham.

Prior to 1942, voters were required by the Representation of the People Act to have a minimum income as well as at least an acre of land or land that produced a minimum profit. This restricted democratic participation to the wealthy elite, many of them owners of the plantations that still dominated Barbados’ sugar cane economic landscape. However, in the 1920s, villages began to expand, resulting in the rise of a newly enfranchised electorate, mostly from the working class and of colour. The League's early focus was the increased registration of these new voters, in an effort push through legislation that had been widely opposed by the elite. These included compulsory free education, the abolition of child labour and expanded worker protections. As a part of this and with his background in Labour and democratic socialism, O’Neal also worked towards the organization and unionization of the workers, including representing them during strike action.

O’Neal was elected to the constituency of the city of Bridgetown in 1932, a seat he held until his death on 19 November, 1936.

== Legacy ==
The Democratic League shifted Barbadian politics away from a paradigm that focused on voting for individual to where the current system, where support of a party over the individual tends to guide voters. Some of the goals of O’Neal's Democratic League were taken up by his opponents in the Barbados Labour Party after his death and some, such as free education, were later to be accomplished by the Democratic Labour Party.

One of the two main bridges over the Careenage in the capital-city Bridgetown is named the Charles Duncan O'Neal Bridge.

By an act of Parliament in 1998, O'Neal was named as one of the National Heroes of Barbados. He is on the $10 Barbados banknote.
