= Indian River (Barbados) =

River of Barbados

- Location of mouth

Location
- Country: Barbados
- Parish: Saint Michael Parish, Barbados

Physical characteristics
- Mouth: Caribbean Sea
  - coordinates: 13°06′N 59°37′W

The Indian River was a river of Barbados. It was located in the Spring Garden area, in the parish of St. Michael.

Essentially no longer in existence due to modern landscaping and much improved drainage in the area, it withered away and 'disappeared' in the mid-20th century, some time after about 1970. At best, it might today be described as a seasonal watercourse.

== See also ==
- List of rivers of Barbados
