= T. T. Lewis =

Barbadian politician (1905–1959)

T. T. Lewis (10 December 1905 – 1959) was a politician in Barbados.

Born Atholl Edwin Seymour Lewis, T. T. Lewis was one of a set of twins born in Drax Hall, Barbados. Lewis was only afforded primary education, but valued education in his political career.

He was elected to the Barbados Parliament in 1942, as an independent. He was re-elected in 1944 and 1946 on the Congress Party (CNG) ticket, and re-elected 1948–55 with the Barbados Labour Party (BLP). Lewis, a White man, was fired from his job in 1949 for joining the Barbados Labour Party, whose members were of African descent. Sir Grantley Adams supported Lewis during the firing with a 1949 demonstration, called the "Lewis Demonstration." Lewis broke with Adams in the early 1950s, but remained a member of the BLP. In 1956 the Democratic Labour Party (DLP) was formed and Lewis joined the new party. During the 1956 election, Lewis ran as a member of the DLP, and was defeated.

Among other efforts, Lewis is known for advocating free secondary education for all in Barbados. In 1959 Lewis died while in St. Lucia for his daughter's wedding. In 1962 secondary education was guaranteed to all Bajans, after the major 1961 win by the DLP in the Barbados parliament, and the assumption of the duties of Prime Minister by Errol Barrow, DLP.
