= Saint Thomas (Barbados Parliament constituency) =

Parliamentary constituency in Barbados

- Constituency for the House of Assembly of Barbados
- Region: Saint Thomas, Barbados

Current constituency
- Created: 1645

Saint Thomas is a constituency in the Saint Thomas parish of Barbados. It was established in 1645 as one of the original 11 constituencies. Since 2026, it has been represented in the House of Assembly of the Barbadian Parliament by Gregory Nicholls, a member of the BLP. (Note: As with all constituencies, the constituency elects one member of parliament (MP) by the first past the post system of election at least every five years.) It was previously held for 25 years by Cynthia Y. Forde. The Saint Thomas constituency is a safe seat for the BLP.

== Boundaries ==
The constituency runs:

From a point in the centre of the road called Highway 2 (the SpringvaleHaggatts Road) opposite to a monument (B.7) placed on the western side of the road in a straight line to the triangulation station known as “ Hillaby” S.15 at the end of the Hillaby Tenantry Road; thence in a westerly direction along the middle of Hillaby Tenantry Road to its junction with Farmers-Turners Hall Road; thence in a southerly direction along the middle of the Farmers-Turners Hall Road to its junction with the Farmers-Plum Tree-Ridgeway Gully; thence in a westerly direction along the Farmers-Plum Tree-Ridgeway Gully to the point at which it is crossed by the Ronald Mapp Highway (the Warrens-Rock Dundo Road); thence in a southerly direction along the middle of the Ronald Mapp Highway to its junction with the Luther Johnson Roundabout; thence in a westerly direction along the middle of the Seaview-Reeves Hill Road to a point marked by a monument (B.8) placed on the southern side of the road; thence in a southerly direction to the middle of the Ridgeway-Molyneaux gully; thence in an easterly direction along the middle of the Ridgeway-Molyneaux gully to the point where it is crossed by the Ronald Mapp Highway; thence in a southerly direction along the Ronald Mapp Highway to its junction with the Bagatelle-Grand View Road; thence along the middle of the Bagatelle-Grand View Road to the point where it crosses the Apple Grove Gully; thence in a southerly then westerly direction along the middle of the Apple Grove Gully to a point leading to Terrace Drive Road, Welches Terrace; thence in a westerly direction along the middle of Terrace Drive Road to the Ronald Mapp Highway; thence in a southerly direction to its junction with the Gordon Cummins Highway; thence in an easterly direction along the Gordon Cummins Highway to its junction with Highway 2 at Everton Weekes Roundabout; thence in a north easterly direction along Highway 2 to its junction with the Jackson-Canewood Road; thence in an easterly direction along the middle of the Canewood Road to its junction with Highway E (Hothersal Turning-Proute Village Road); thence in a north-easterly direction along the middle of Highway E to the point where it crosses the Fisherpond-Proute-Bridgefield Gully; thence along the middle of the said gully to the point where it meets the Jack-In-The-Box Gully; thence along the middle of the Jack-In-The-Box Gully to the point where it is crossed by the Hopewell-Walkes Spring Road; then turning right along the middle of the Hopewell-Walkes Spring Road to its junction with Highway E; then turning left along the middle of Highway E to its junction with the Mt. Wilton-Bloomsbury Road; thence turning right along the middle of the Mt. Wilton-Bloomsbury Road to its junction with Highway 2; thence along the middle of Highway 2 to a point in the centre of Highway 2 (the Sturges-Springvale Road) opposite the monument (B.7) (the starting point).

== Members ==
Election	Member	Party
2001 by-election	Cynthia Y. Forde	BLP
2003	Cynthia Y. Forde	BLP
2008	Cynthia Y. Forde	BLP
2013	Cynthia Y. Forde	BLP
2018	Cynthia Y. Forde	BLP
2022	Cynthia Y. Forde	BLP
2026	Gregory Nicholls	BLP

== Elections ==
=== 2022 ===
St. Thomas
Party	Candidate	Votes	%	±%
BLP	Cynthia Forde	2,971	78.6	−7.1
DLP	Rolerick Hinds	625	16.5	+5.7
BSP	Philip Catlyn	98	2.6	New
Independent	Samuel Maynard	88	2.3	New
Majority		2,346	62.0	−12.9
Turnout		3,782		
BLP hold		Swing	-6.4	

=== 2018 ===
St. Thomas
Party	Candidate	Votes	%	±%
BLP	Cynthia Forde	5,038	85.7	+20.1
DLP	Rolerick Hinds	635	10.8	−23.6
SB	Pauline Corbin	206	3.5	new
Majority		4,403	74.9	+43.7
Turnout		5,879		
BLP hold		Swing	+21.8	
