= Long Pond River (Barbados) =

River in Barbados

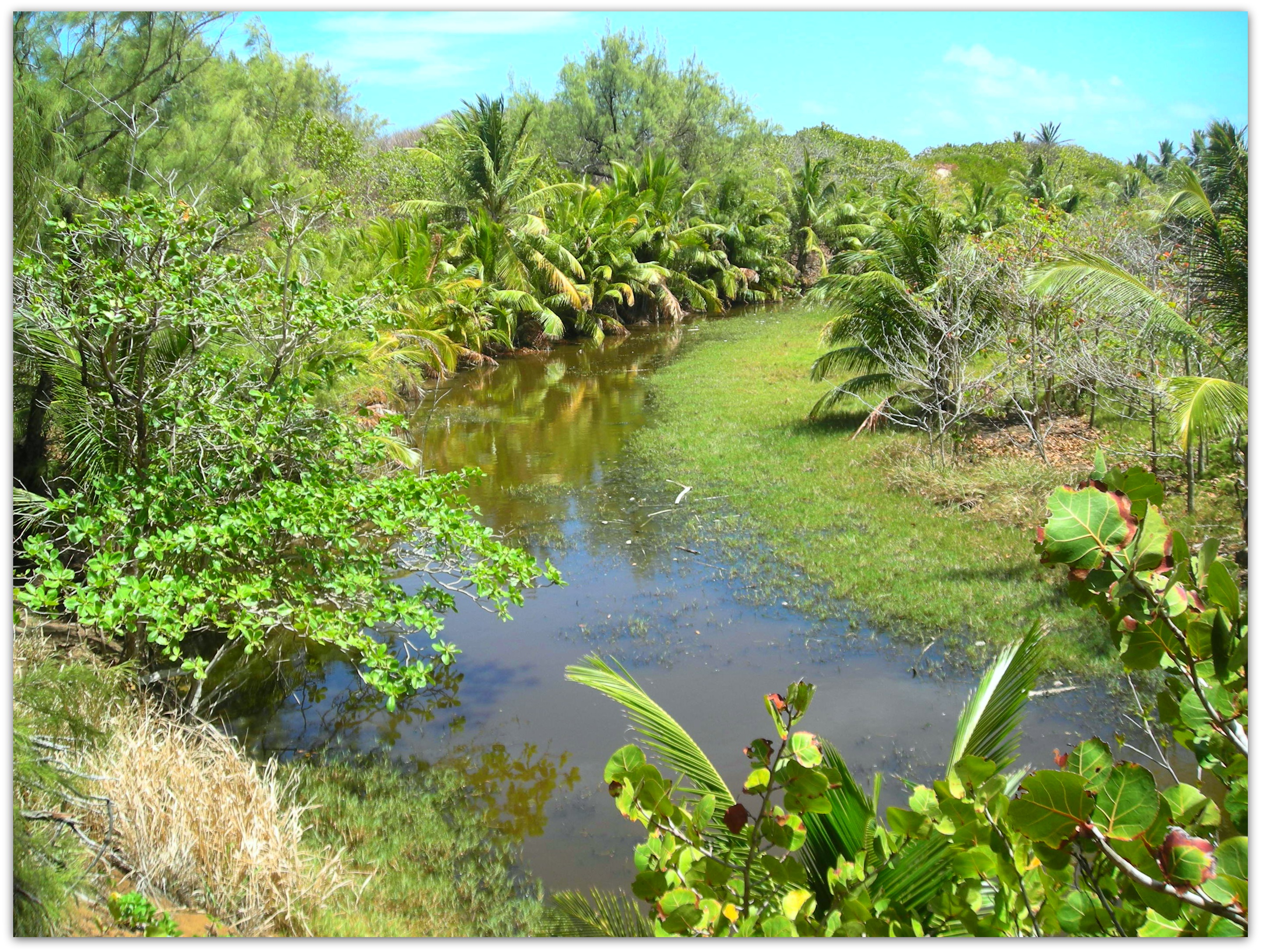
- Long Pond River

- Location of mouth

Location
- Country: Barbados
- Parish: Saint Andrew, Barbados

Physical characteristics
- Mouth: Atlantic Ocean
  - coordinates: 13°15′06″N 59°33′20″W
  - elevation: Sea level

The Long Pond River (Barbados) is a river of Barbados.

== See also ==
- List of rivers of Barbados
