= Bruce Vale River =

River in Barbados

- Location of mouth

Location
- Country: Barbados
- Parish: Saint Andrew, Barbados

Physical characteristics
- Mouth: Atlantic Ocean
  - coordinates: 13°15′N 59°33′W

The Bruce Vale River is a river of Barbados.

== See also ==
- List of rivers of Barbados
