= People's Progressive Movement (Barbados) =

Political party in Barbados

The People's Progressive Movement was a political party in Barbados. It first contested national elections in 1956, when it received 1.7% of the vote, but failed to win a seat. It did not contest the 1961 elections, but returned in 1966, when it received just 0.4% of the vote, again failing to win a seat.
