= 1942 Barbadian general election =

Election in Barbados

General elections were held in Barbados on 26 January 1942. The result was a victory for the Barbados Electors Association, which won 15 of the 24 seats in the House of Assembly.

== Results ==
Party	Seats
Barbados Electors Association	15
Barbados Progressive League	4
Independents	5
Total	24
Source: Lewis
