= People's Political Alliance =

Barbados political party

The People's Political Alliance was a minor political party in Barbados. It participated in the 1976 elections, in which it received just 572 votes (0.6%) and failed to win a seat. It did not run in subsequent elections.
