= 1961 Barbadian general election =

- 4 December 1961

24 seats in the House of Assembly 13 seats needed for a majority
- Turnout: 61.32% (▲1.03pp)
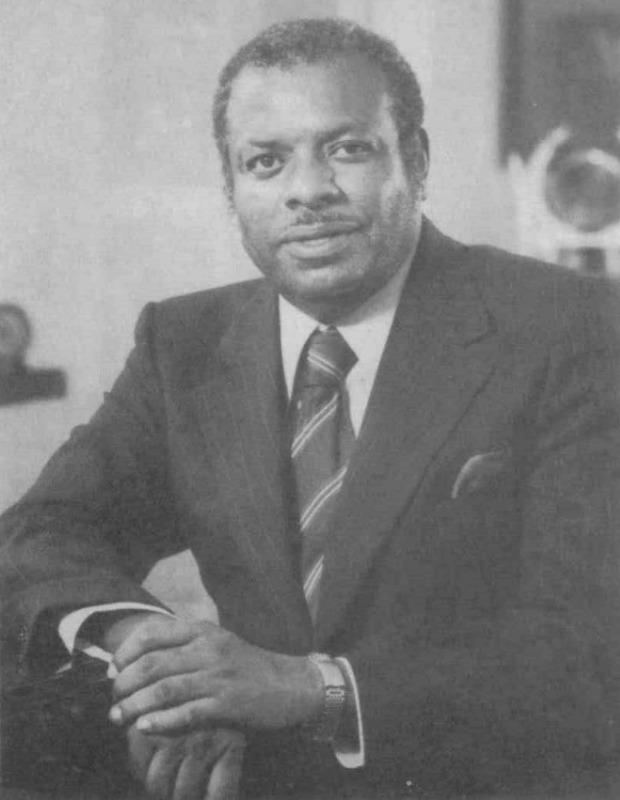

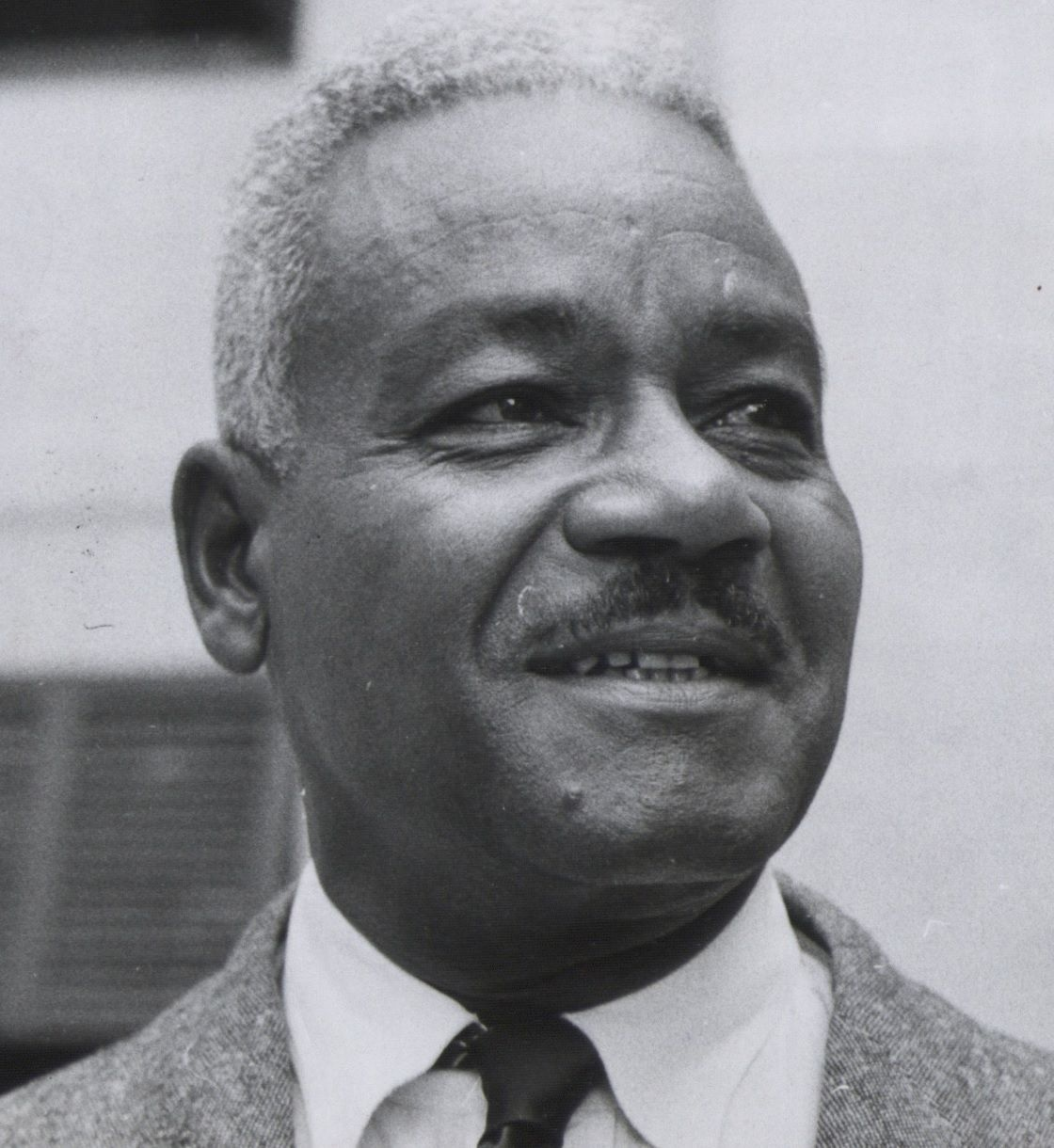

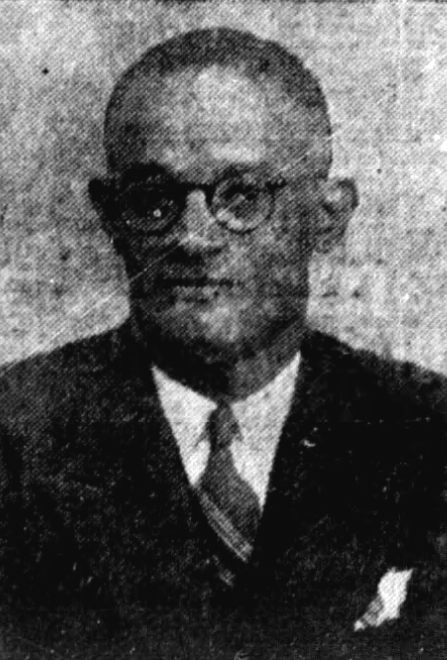
	First party	Second party	Third party
Leader	Errol Barrow	Hugh Gordon Cummins	Ernest Mottley
Party	DLP	BLP	BNP
Last election	4 seats	15 seats	3 seats
Seats won	14	5	4
Seat change	▲10	▼10	▲1
Popular vote	39,534	40,096	24,015
Percentage	36.30%	36.82%	22.05%
Swing	▲16.38pp	▼12.53pp	▲0.70pp
- Results by constituency
Premier before election
Hugh Gordon Cummins
BLP
Elected Premier
Errol Barrow
DLP

General elections were held in Barbados on 4 December 1961. They were the first held after Barbados was granted full self-government earlier in the year. 24 MPs were elected across twelve two-member constituencies, using the block vote method.

Although the incumbent Barbados Labour Party (BLP) received more votes, the non-proportional electoral system allowed the opposition Democratic Labour Party (DLP) to win 14 of the 24 seats and form a government for the first time. Among the defeated BLP candidates was the Premier Hugh Gordon Cummins, who lost his St. Thomas seat. This was also the last time an independent was elected to the assembly, with trade union leader Frank Leslie Walcott winning a seat in the St. Peter constituency. Voter turnout was 61.3%.

== Results ==
The result was highly disproportionate for the two major parties, with the BLP receiving 37% of the vote but only winning 25% of the seats, while the DLP received 36% of the vote and won 58% of the seats.

Party	Votes	%	Seats	+/–
Barbados Labour Party	40,096	36.82	5	–10
Democratic Labour Party	39,534	36.30	14	+10
Barbados National Party	24,015	22.05	4	+1
Independents	5,263	4.83	1	–1
Total	108,908	100.00	24	0
Valid votes	63,536	99.14		
Invalid/blank votes	554	0.86		
Total votes	64,090	100.00		
Registered voters/turnout	104,518	61.32		
Source: Caribbean Elections
