= 1944 Barbadian general election =

Election in Barbados

General elections were held in Barbados on 27 November 1944. Three parties each won eight of the 24 seats in the House of Assembly.

The elections were the first in Barbados with women's suffrage. Prior to the elections, the income requirement for voter registration was also reduced from £50 to £20. These changes led to the number of registered voters increasing from around 6,000 in 1938 to over 15,000.

== Results ==
Party	Seats	+/–
Barbados Electors Association	8	–7
Barbados Progressive League	8	+4
West Indian National Congress Party	8	New
Total	24	0
Source: Lewis

== Aftermath ==
Following the elections, a coalition government was formed by the Barbados Progressive League and the West Indian National Congress Party.
