= 1951 Barbadian general election =

- 13 December 1951

All 24 seats in the House of Assembly 13 seats needed for a majority
- Turnout: 64.65%
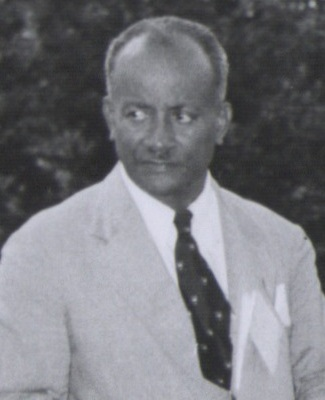

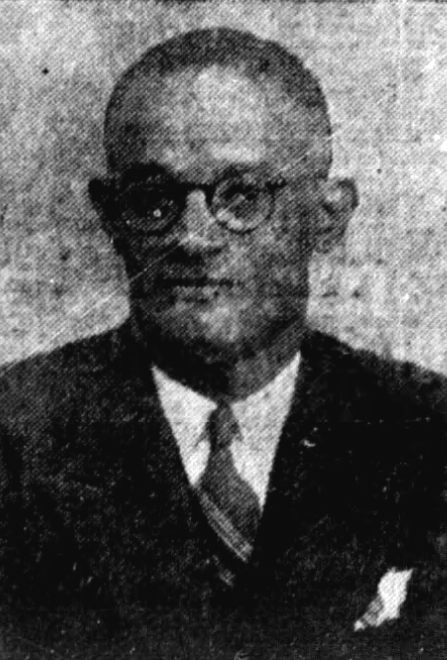

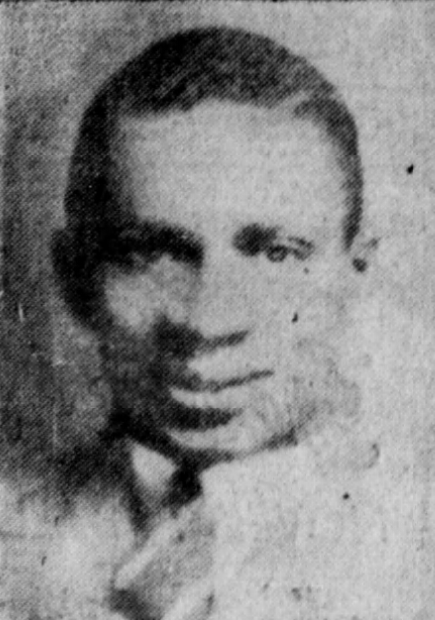
	First party	Second party	Third party
Leader	Grantley Adams	Ernest Mottley	Wynter Crawford
Party	BLP	BEA	WINCP
Last election	12 seats	9 seats	3 seats
Seats won	15	4	2
Seat change	▲3	▼5	▼1
Popular vote	53,321	29,131	5,224
Percentage	54.47%	29.76%	5.34%
- Results by constituency

General elections were held in Barbados on 13 December 1951, the first held under universal suffrage. The result was a victory for the Barbados Labour Party, which won 15 of the 24 seats. Voter turnout was 65%. Edna Ermyntrude Bourne, elected in the Parish of St. Andrew, became the island's first female member of the House of Assembly.

At the time of the election, Barbados did not have a formal ministerial government. This was established on 1 February 1954, when Grantley Herbert Adams became the first Premier.

== Results ==
Party	Votes	%	Seats	+/–
Barbados Labour Party	53,321	54.47	15	+3
Barbados Electors' Association	29,131	29.76	4	–5
West Indian National Congress Party	5,224	5.34	2	–1
Independents	10,212	10.43	3	+3
Total	97,888	100.00	24	0
Valid votes	61,133	98.56		
Invalid/blank votes	891	1.44		
Total votes	62,024	100.00		
Registered voters/turnout	95,939	64.65		
Source: Caribbean Elections
