= Constitution River =

River in Barbados

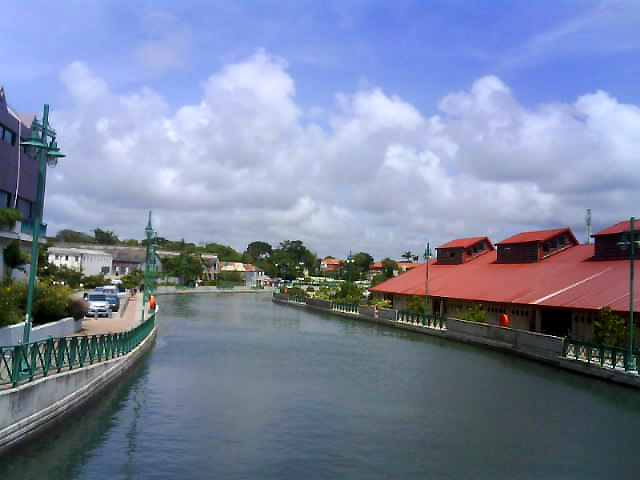
- Constitution River and Fairchild Street Bus Terminal

- Location of mouth

Location
- Country: Barbados
- Parish: Saint Michael, Barbados

Physical characteristics
- Mouth: Caribbean Sea
  - coordinates: 13°05′46″N 59°36′52″W
  - elevation: Sea level

The Constitution River, commonly called "The Careenage", is a river located along Carlisle Bay, on the south-western portion of Barbados. The western end of the river runs through the centre of Bridgetown in Saint Michael. The river acts as a channel for heavy rain run-off from the higher interior regions of the island. Additionally, it is a small sheltered shallow passage or yacht harbour for medium-sized yachts or small craft boats to dock in the city. It is located roughly 1 km south of the man-made Deep Water Harbour on the Princess Alice Highway.

== See also ==
- List of rivers of Barbados
