= 1948 Barbadian general election =

Election in Barbados

General elections were held in Barbados on 13 December 1948. The Barbados Labour Party remained the largest party, winning 12 of the 24 seats in the House of Assembly. It was the last election held before the introduction of universal suffrage in 1950.

== Results ==
Party	Votes	%	Seats	+/–
Barbados Labour Party	14,287		12	+3
Barbados Electors Association	12,467		9	+3
West Indian National Congress Party	3,887		3	–4
Independents			0	–2
Total			24	0
Registered voters/turnout	29,120	–		
Source: Kunsman, Lewis, The Barbados Advocate

== Aftermath ==
Following the elections K.N.R. Husbands was elected Speaker, becoming the first black man to hold the position. In 1949 Muriel Hanschell was appointed to the Legislative Council, becoming the first female member of Parliament.
