= 1946 Barbadian general election =

Election in Barbados

General elections were held in Barbados in November 1946. The Barbados Labour Party emerged as the largest party, winning nine of the 24 seats. Following the election, ministerial portfolios were introduced.

== Results ==
Party	Seats	+/–
Barbados Labour Party	9	+1
West Indian National Congress Party	7	–1
Barbados Electors Association	6	–2
Independents	2	+2
Total	24	0
Source: Parliament of Barbados
