= 1956 Barbadian general election =

- 7 December 1956

24 seats in the House of Assembly 13 seats needed for a majority
- Turnout: 60.29% (▼4.36pp)
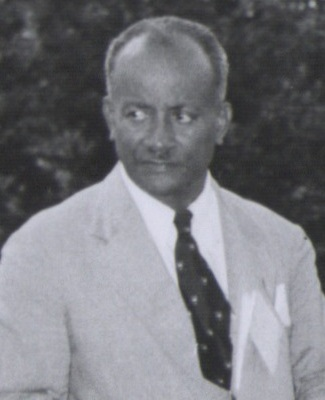

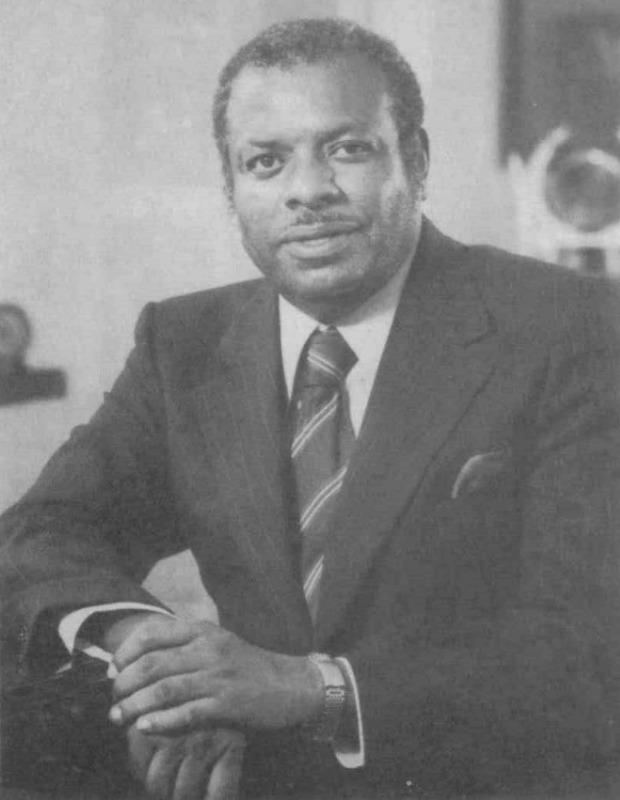

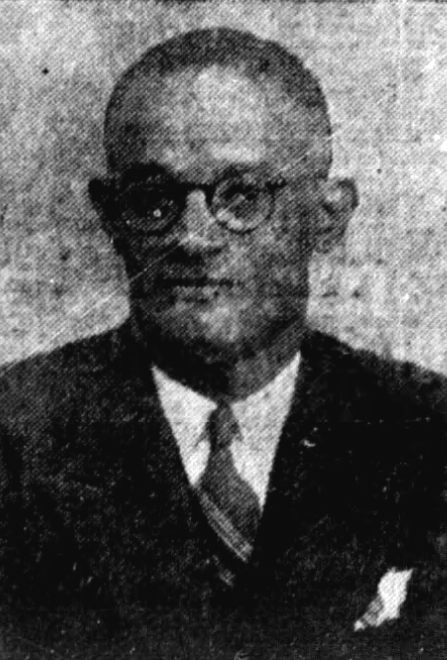
	First party	Second party	Third party
Leader	Grantley Adams	Errol Barrow	Ernest Mottley
Party	BLP	DLP	PCP
Last election	15 seats	–	4 seats
Seats won	15	4	3
Seat change	Steady	New party	▼1
Popular vote	48,667	19,650	21,060
Percentage	49.35%	19.92%	21.35
Swing	▼5.12pp	New party	▼8.41pp
- Results by constituency
Premier before election
Grantley Herbert Adams
BLP
Elected Premier
Grantley Herbert Adams
BLP

General elections were held in Barbados on 7 December 1956. The result was a victory for the Barbados Labour Party, which won 15 of the 24 seats. MPs were elected across twelve two-member constituencies, using the block voting method. Voter turnout was 60%.

Despite winning more votes than the newly formed Democratic Labour Party, the Progressive Conservative Party won fewer seats, a consequence of the plurality voting system used.

== Results ==
Party	Votes	%	Seats	+/–
Barbados Labour Party	48,667	49.35	15	0
Progressive Conservative Party	21,060	21.35	3	–1
Democratic Labour Party	19,650	19.92	4	New
People's Progressive Movement	1,695	1.72	0	New
Independents	7,552	7.66	2	–1
Total	98,624	100.00	24	0
Valid votes	61,553	98.84		
Invalid/blank votes	721	1.16		
Total votes	62,274	100.00		
Registered voters/turnout	103,290	60.29		
Source: Caribbean Elections
