= 1966 Barbadian general election =

- 3 November 1966

24 seats in the House of Assembly 13 seats needed for a majority
- Turnout: 79.70% (▲18.38pp)
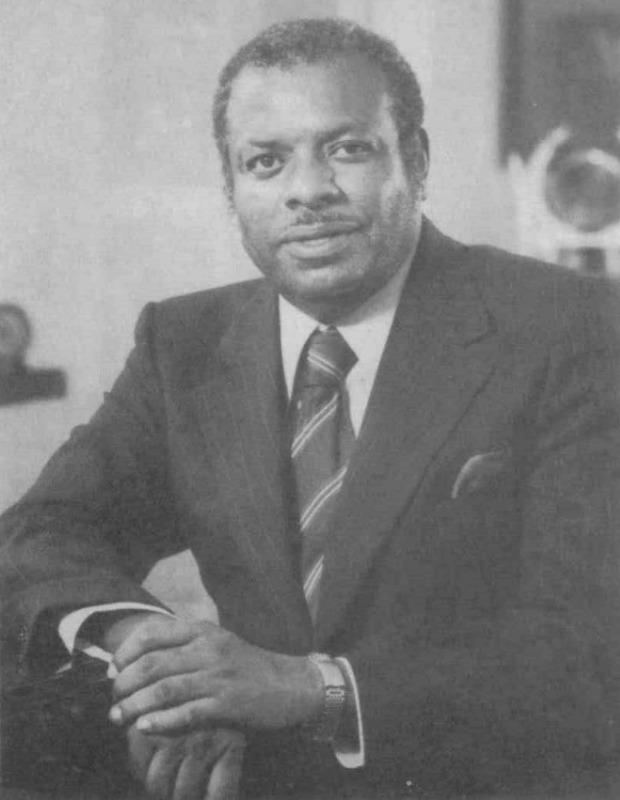

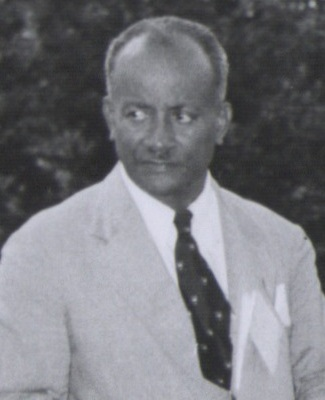

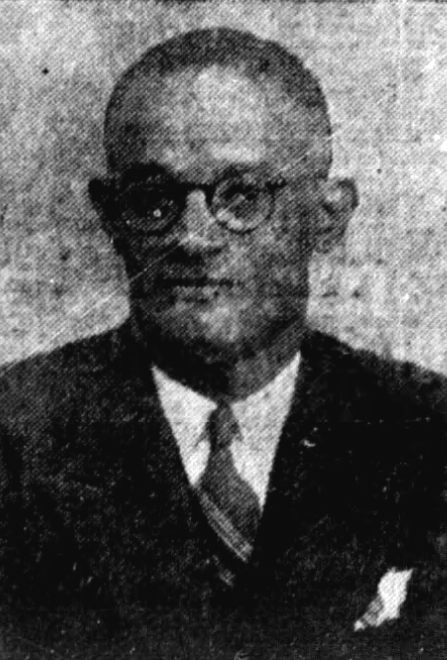
	First party	Second party	Third party
Leader	Errol Barrow	Grantley Adams	Ernest Mottley
Party	DLP	BLP	BNP
Leader's seat	St. John	St. Joseph	City of Bridgetown
Last election	36.30%, 14 seats	36.82%, 5 seats	22.05%, 4 seats
Seats won	14	8	2
Seat change	Steady	▲3	▼2
Popular vote	72,384	47,610	14,801
Percentage	49.56%	32.60%	10.13%
Swing	▲13.26pp	▼4.22pp	▼11.92pp
- Results by constituency
Premier before election
Errol Barrow
DLP
Elected Premier
Errol Barrow
DLP

General elections were held in Barbados on 3 November 1966. The elections were the last held using two-member constituencies, in which each voter had two votes. The result was a victory for the Democratic Labour Party, which won 14 of the 24 seats. This was the last election contested by the Barbados National Party (BNP, also known as the Conservatives). Once a powerful force in Barbados politics, the party nominated only four candidates and was reduced to two seats; the BNP formally disbanded in 1970. Voter turnout was 80%.

This was the last election before Barbados gained its formal independence from Britain on 30 November 1966. On 18 November, in anticipation of independence, the title of the Premier was changed to Prime Minister.

== Results ==
Party	Votes	%	Seats	+/–
Democratic Labour Party	72,384	49.56	14	0
Barbados Labour Party	47,610	32.60	8	+3
Barbados National Party	14,801	10.13	2	–2
People's Progressive Movement	598	0.41	0	New
Independents	10,661	7.30	0	–1
Total	146,054	100.00	24	0
Valid votes	79,154	99.33		
Invalid/blank votes	537	0.67		
Total votes	79,691	100.00		
Registered voters/turnout	99,988	79.70		
Source: Caribbean Elections
