= Saint Philip North (Barbados Parliament constituency) =

Parliamentary constituency in Barbados

- Constituency for the House of Assembly of Barbados
- Region: Saint Philip, Barbados

Current constituency
- Created: 1971

Saint Philip North is a constituency in the Saint Philip parish of Barbados. It was established in 1971. Since 2018, it has been represented in the House of Assembly of the Barbadian Parliament by Sonia Browne, a member of the BLP. (Note: As with all constituencies, the constituency elects one member of parliament (MP) by the first past the post system of election at least every five years.) The Saint Philip North constituency is a marginal seat for the BLP.

== Boundaries ==
The constituency runs:

From Shark’s Hole on the south eastern sea coast along a straight line to the junction of the Belair-Sam Lord’s Road with the Long Bay Road; thence along the middle of the Long Bay Road to its junction at Robinson’s Corner with the Merricks-Eastbourne Road; thence in a westerly direction along the middle of the Merricks-Eastbourne Road to its junction with Highway M (the Bushy Park-Beulah Road); thence in a northerly direction along the middle of Highway M to its junction with the Bushy Park-Harrow Road; thence in a westerly direction along the middle of the Bushy Park-Harrow Road to its junction with the Marchfield-St. Philip’s Church Road; thence in a northerly direction along the middle of the Marchfield-St. Philip’s Church Road to its junction with Church Village-Thicket Road; thence in a westerly direction along the middle of the Church Village-Thicket Road to its junction with Cox Hill; thence along the middle of the Cox Hill to a track which leads to the District C-Massiah Street Road at Moncrieffe; thence in an easterly direction along the middle of this track to the District C-Massiah Street Road; thence in a northerly direction along the middle of the District C-Massiah Street Road to its junction with a public road leading to Mount Pleasant Plantation; thence in an easterly and then a northerly direction along this public road to its junction with the Stewart Hill Road; thence in an easterly direction along the middle of the Stewart Hill Road to its junction with the Thicket-Palmer’s Road; thence along the middle of the Thicket-Palmer’s Road in a northerly direction to its junction with the College Savannah-Supers Road; thence along the middle of the College Savannah-Supers Road to a monument (B.15) located at the St. Mark’s Church driveway; thence in a straight line to a monument (B.16) near the edge of the cliff on the sea coast; thence in a southerly direction and then in a south westerly direction along the sea coast to Shark’s Hole (the starting point).

== Members ==
Election	Member	Party
2018	Sonia Browne	BLP
2022	Sonia Browne	BLP

== Elections ==
=== 2022 ===
St. Philip North
Party	Candidate	Votes	%	±%
BLP	Sonia Browne	2,393	50.5	−10.5
DLP	Michael Lashley	2,158	45.5	+11.5
APP	Nigel Newton	88	1.9	+0.3
Independent	Omar Smith	64	1.4	New
Independent	Wayne Beckles	39	0.8	New
Majority		235	5.0	−22.0
Turnout		4,742		
BLP hold		Swing	-11.0	

=== 2018 ===
St. Philip North
Party	Candidate	Votes	%	±%
BLP	Sonia Browne	3,613	61.0	+28.2
DLP	Michael Lashley	2,015	34.0	−33.2
SB	Rosaline Corbin	203	3.4	new
UPP	Nigel Newton	92	1.6	new
Majority		1,598	27.0	−7.5
Turnout		5,923		
BLP gain from DLP		Swing	+30.7	
