= 1940 Barbadian general election =

Election in Barbados

General elections were held in Barbados in 1940. The Voters Association won all but five of the seats in the House of Assembly, with the Barbados Progressive League winning the remaining five.

== Results ==
Party	Seats
Voters Association	19
Barbados Progressive League	5
Total	24
