= Barbados National Party =

Political party in Barbados

- Abbreviation: BNP
- Leader: Ernest Deighton Mottley (final leader)
- Founded: 1940 (as the Voters Association)
- Dissolved: 1970
- Ideology: Progressive conservatism
- Political position: Centre-right

The Barbados National Party was a political party in Barbados.

== History ==
The 1940 elections saw the Voters Association, an informal grouping of white politicians, win 19 of the 24 seats in the House of Assembly. The following year, the group became a formal political party under the name "Barbados Electors Association". In the 1942 elections they won 15 seats, but the 1944 elections saw the party reduced to eight seats under the leadership of Fred Goddard, with the Barbados Progressive League and the West Indian National Congress Party forming a coalition government. In the 1946 elections they were reduced to six seats, but recovered to win nine seats in the 1948 elections.

In the 1951 elections, the first under universal suffrage, the party (now led by Ernest Mottley) won four seats. They contested the 1956 elections as the Progressive Conservative Party, winning three seats. Prior to the 1958 West Indies federal election, the party was renamed the Barbados National Party, going on to win one of the five seats allocated to Barbados, taken by Florence Daysh. The party won four seats in the 1961 Barbadian general elections, in which it called on voters to vote for the Democratic Labour Party in constituencies it did not contest. After being reduced to two seats in 1966, the party was dissolved in 1970.

== Election results ==
=== House of Assembly ===
Election	Leader	Votes	%	Seats	+/–	Position	Status
1940				19 / 24	19	1st	No Ministerial Government
1942				15 / 24	▲15	▲1st	No Ministerial Government
1944	Fred Goddard			8 / 24	▼7	▲ Joint 1st/2nd/3rd	No Ministerial Government
1946	Fred Goddard			6 / 24	▼2	▼3rd	No Ministerial Government
1948	Fred Goddard	12,467	42.8%	9 / 24	▲3	▲2nd	No Ministerial Government
1951	Ernest Deighton Mottley	29,131	29.8%	4 / 24	▼5	2nd	No Ministerial Government
1956	Ernest Deighton Mottley	21,060	21.4%	3 / 24	▼1	▼3rd	Opposition
1961	Ernest Deighton Mottley	24,015	22.1%	4 / 24	▲1	3rd	Opposition
1966	Ernest Deighton Mottley	14,801	10.1%	2 / 24	▼2	3rd	Opposition
