= West Indian National Congress Party =

- Abbreviation: WINCP
- Leader: Wynter Crawford
- Founder: Wynter Crawford
- Founded: 1944
- Split from: Barbados Progressive League

The West Indian National Congress Party was a political party in Barbados.

== History ==
The party was established in 1944 by Wynter Crawford as a breakaway from the Barbados Progressive League. In the November 1944 elections it was one of the three parties that won eight of the 24 seats each, and formed a coalition government with the Progressive League. The party won seven seats in the 1946 elections and three seats in 1948. In the 1951 elections, the first under universal suffrage, the party was reduced to two seats. It did not run in subsequent general elections. Crawford contested the next elections in 1956 as a candidate of the Democratic Labour Party, another breakaway from the Progressive League (now renamed the Barbados Labour Party).
