= Ernest Deighton Mottley =

Barbadian politician (1907–1973)

Ernest Deighton Mottley CBE
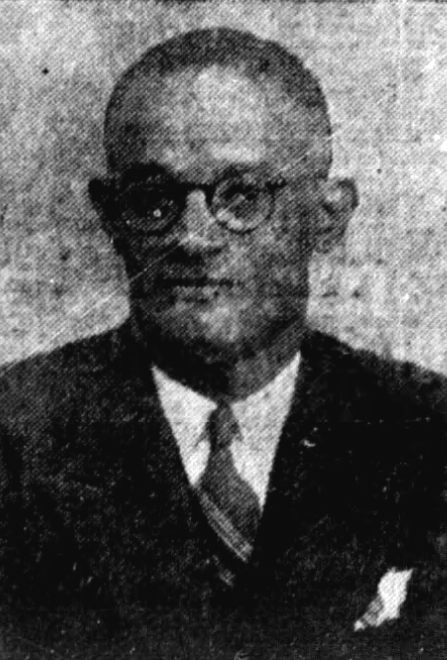
- Mottley in 1951
- Born: 11 May 1907; Barbados
- Died: 27 April 1973 (aged 65); Barbados
- Occupation: Politician
- Known for: Leader of the Barbados National Party, and first mayor of Bridgetown
- Relatives: Mia Mottley (granddaughter)

Ernest Deighton Mottley CBE (11 May 1907 – 27 April 1973) was a Barbadian politician, leader of the Barbados National Party, and the first mayor of Bridgetown (1959). He was a member of the House of Assembly of Barbados from 1946 to 1971.

He was friends with Errol Barrow, though after the election of 1961, Mottley became Leader of the Opposition to Barrow's Barbados Labour Party government.

In 1962, Mottley was honoured as an Ordinary Commander of the Civil Division of the Most Excellent Order of the British Empire (CBE) for public services in Barbados.

His granddaughter, Mia Mottley, became the first female prime minister of Barbados in 2018.
