= House of Assembly of Barbados =

Lower house of the Parliament of Barbados

House of Assembly

Type
- Type: Lower house of the Parliament of Barbados

History
- Founded: 26 June 1639; 387 years ago

Leadership
- Speaker: Arthur E. Holder, BLP since 5 June 2018
- Prime Minister: Mia Mottley, BLP since 25 May 2018
- Leader of the Opposition: Vacant since 11 February 2026

Structure
- House of Assembly political groups: Government (30): BLP (30)

Elections
- House of Assembly voting system: First-past-the-post
- Last House of Assembly election: 11 February 2026
- Next House of Assembly election: By 2031

Meeting place
- House of Assembly chamber Bridgetown, St. Michael, Barbados

Website
- The House of Assembly

The House of Assembly of Barbados is the lower house of the bicameral Parliament of Barbados. It has 30 Members of Parliament (MPs), who are directly elected in single member constituencies using the simple-majority (or first-past-the-post) system for a term of five years. The House of Assembly sits roughly 40–45 days a year and is presided over by a Speaker. If the Speaker elected by the Assembly is not an MP currently in the House of Assembly, that Speaker becomes the 31st member of the Assembly, having a vote on motions that are tied.

The Barbadian House of Assembly chamber is located in the east-wing of The Public Buildings on Broad Street, in Bridgetown, Barbados.

== History ==
The genesis of a legislature in Barbados was introduced by Governor Henry Hawley, creating a structure of governance to Barbados, itself patterned after the Parliament of England). The then unicameral Parliament originally was tasked with establishing a system of laws and was completely under the domination of the island's planter-class. The first meeting of the Barbados Assembly was held on 22 June 1639 making it the third oldest legislature in the Americas (behind the Virginia General Assembly and Bermuda House of Assembly), and is among the oldest in the Commonwealth of Nations.

== Oath of affirmation ==
Under section 59 of the constitution, before entering upon the functions of his office, the MPs must take the oath of allegiance to Barbados.

== Next election ==
The Constitution of Barbados reads, in part:

- 61(3) "...Parliament, unless sooner dissolved, shall continue for five years from the date of its first sitting after any dissolution and shall then stand dissolved."
- 62(1) "After every dissolution of Parliament the Governor General [since 30 November 2021: President] shall issue writs for a general election of members of appointment the House of Assembly returnable within ninety days from that dissolution."

The next election is therefore due to be held in 2031, but can be held sooner if the President of Barbados so directs.

== Latest elections ==
Party	Votes	%	Seats	+/–
Barbados Labour Party	71,109	69.83	30	0
Democratic Labour Party	27,808	27.31	0	0
Friends of Democracy	1,424	1.40	0	New
People's Coalition for Progress	910	0.89	0	New
Bajan Free Party	161	0.16	0	0
Independents	426	0.42	0	0
Total	101,838	100.00	30	0
Source: Barbados Today

== Previous elections ==
In previous elections the National Democratic Party (NDP), the Barbados National Party (BNP) (which previously was known as the Voter's Association, Barbados Electors Association and the Progressive Conservative Party in prior years), the West Indian National Congress Party (WINCP) and Independents also won seats besides the two big parties – the Barbados Labour Party (BLP) (earlier known as the Barbados Progressive League (BPL)) and the Democratic Labour Party (DLP). The DLP had been in opposition since 6 September 1994. Fourteen years later when they won a surprise victory of 20 seats to 10 on 15 January 2008, DLP Leader David Thompson was sworn in as the 6th Prime Minister of Barbados. Freundel Stuart was sworn in on 23 October 2010 because of the death of Prime Minister Thompson, who had been diagnosed with pancreatic cancer in March 2010. Two months later in May he became ill when the then acting prime minister Freundel Stuart had started, and five months later he was sworn in on 23 October as the 7th prime minister of Barbados. On 23 February 2013 he was sworn in as the 7th prime minister of Barbados by obtaining sixteen out of thirty seats. The general elections of 21 February were one of the closest elections Barbados has ever seen. On 24 May 2018, the BLP returned to power under Mia Mottley with a historic landslide victory that saw them win all 30 seats in parliament and Mottley becoming the first female prime minister and the 8th prime minister overall. This occurred once again on the 19 January 2022 when the Mottley Administration won all 30 seats again in another landslide victory. In February 2026, prime minister Mia Mottley won her third consecutive election victory by landslide, meaning her Barbados Labour party won again all the 30 seats in the House of Assembly.

Election	BPL/BLP	DLP	NDP	VA/BEA/PCP/BNP	WINCP	Independents
11 February 2026	30	0				
19 January 2022	30	0				
24 May 2018	30	0				
21 February 2013	14	16				
15 January 2008	10	20				
21 May 2003	23	7				
20 January 1999	26	2				
6 September 1994	19	8	1			
21 January 1991	10	18	0			
28 May 1986	3	24				
18 June 1981	17	10				
2 September 1976	17	7				
9 September 1971	6	18				
3 November 1966	8	14		2		
4 December 1961	5	14		4		1
6 December 1956	15	4		3		2
13 December 1951	15			4	2	3
13 December 1948	12			9	3	
November 1946	9			6	7	2
27 November 1944	8			8	8	
26 January 1942	5			15		5
1940	5			19		

== See also ==
- Parliament of Barbados
- Senate of Barbados
- Politics of Barbados
- List of legislatures by country
