= Trinidad and Tobago Police Service =

- Abbreviation: T.T.P.S
- Motto: To Protect and Serve with P.R.I.D.E.

Agency overview
- Formed: 1592
- Preceding agency: Trinidad and Tobago Police Force
- Dissolved: 1966
- Employees: 7,884 Regular Officers, 3,005 Special Reserve Police, 530 Civil Servants, 585 Civilian employees
- Annual budget: $2.6 billion TTD (2025)
- Legal personality: Statutory body

Jurisdictional structure
- National agency (Operations jurisdiction): Trinidad and Tobago
- Operations jurisdiction: Trinidad and Tobago
- Area: 1,981 square miles (5,130 km^{2})
- Population: 1,310,000 (January 2011)
- Legal jurisdiction: Republic of Trinidad and Tobago
- Governing body: Government of Trinidad And Tobago
- Constituting instruments: Police Service Act Chapter 15:01; Constitution of the Republic of Trinidad and Tobago Section 123A
- General nature: Civilian police

Operational structure
- Overseen by: The Police Service Commission
- Headquarters: Police Administration Building, Edward and Sackville Street, Port of Spain
- Police Officers: 7,884 Regular Officers, 3,005 Special Reserve Police
- Civil Servants, Civilian employees: 530 Civil Servants, 585 Civilian employees
- Ministers responsible: Roger Alexander, Minister of Homeland Security; Wayne Sturge, Minister in Ministry Of Homeland Security
- Agency executives: Allister Guevarro, Commissioner of Police; Junior Benjamin, Deputy Commissioner of Police (Administration); Suzette Martin, Deputy Commissioner of Police (Operations); Natasha George, Deputy Commissioner of Police (Investigations and Intelligence)
- Parent agency: Ministry Of Homeland Security
- Child agencies: Special Reserve Police; Trinidad and Tobago Municipal Police Service

Facilities
- Police Stations: 84

Notables
- People: Gary Griffith, Commissioner of Police, for Becoming Commissioner of Police after being a Minister of National Security; Roger Alexander, Senior Superintendent of Police, for being Former host of Police Service television show Beyond The Tape and current Minister of Homeland Security; Randolph Burroughs M.O.M. TC, Commissioner of Police, for being awarded both the Medal of Merit and the Trinity Cross
- Programme: Police Youth Club (P.Y.C)
- Award: Police Service awarded the Trinity Cross 1991, For the Preservation of Democracy and Constitutional Government

Website
- www.ttps.gov.tt

The Trinidad and Tobago Police Service or TTPS is the primary law enforcement agency of Trinidad and Tobago. It has been in operation for over 200 years.

The Trinidad and Tobago Police Service (TTPS) is the national law enforcement agency of Trinidad and Tobago, responsible for maintaining law and order, protecting life and property, and preventing and detecting crime. Operating under the Police Service Act Chapter 15:01, the TTPS functions as both a civil and para-military body, structured into various divisions, branches, squads, and units deployed across the islands. Its mandate encompasses a broad range of duties, including enforcing laws, apprehending offenders, and ensuring public safety, with a focus on community policing initiatives and modernization efforts to combat contemporary crime trends. The TTPS works in conjunction with other law enforcement bodies, such as the Trinidad and Tobago Coast Guard and the Municipal Police Service. Citizens use emergency numbers such as 911 and 999 to contact the Police Service.

The TTPS is under the Ministry of Homeland Security (formerly the Ministry of National Security), who provides governmental oversight and administrative support. The Minister of Homeland Security is Roger Alexander MP who was sworn into the cabinet of the new Prime Minister Kamla Persad-Bissessar on 3 May 2025. The ministry also has Wayne Sturge MP, who is also the Minister of Defence, as Ministers in the Ministry of Homeland Security. The Commissioner of Police (CoP) is Allister Guevarro, who was appointed on 18 June 2025, replacing Erla Harewood-Christopher, with Junior Benjamin, Suzette Martin and Natasha George as Deputy Commissioners of Police (DCP).

== History ==
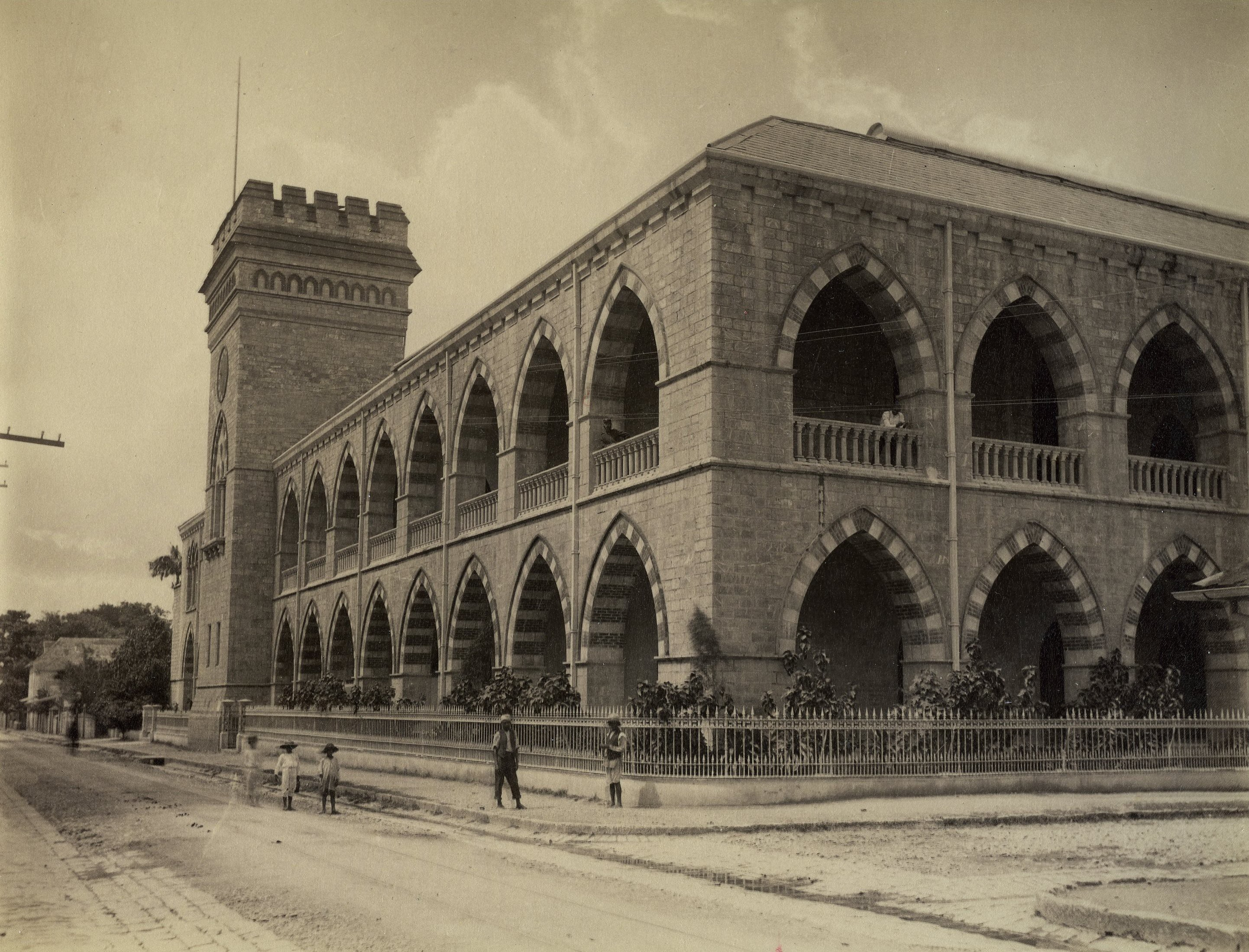
Police headquarters, Port of Spain, end of 19th century

In 1592 the Spaniards founded the first European settlement, Trinidad's capital town San Jose de Oruna (St Joseph). The Office of the Cabildo or Town Council controlled the Police Force. Duties were restricted to within town. The strength of the Police Force never exceeded six between 1592 and 1792.

After slavery was abolished in 1838, and over 22,000 men and women enjoyed their full civil rights, the responsibility of the police increased and a 'rural system of police' had to be established. By the end of 1842 there were twelve police stations and approximately one hundred officers comprising inspectors, sergeants and constables.

In the mid 19th century members of the Metropolitan Police were brought to Trinidad on secondment, thus the Police Force had a very mixed composition as far as racial strains were concerned. During this period the Police Headquarters was housed at the corner of Abercromby and Hart Streets.

The only weapon the policeman carried was his truncheon which was four feet long. Then violence would be met with violence, and a local tradition of the police "beating first and arresting after" was formed. The general pattern of law enforcement in the 1840s was, once arrested the police took the accused to the station or if he was recalcitrant, held him and sent to call the sergeant. All police stations were Courthouses as Magistrates travelled from one Police Station to another. This was until 1844 when trial by jury and the English statutes were introduced into Trinidad.

In 1851 the police was appointed the country's first postmen and mail carriers and the police stations were transformed into Post Offices. The Mounted Branch was established for this purpose. In 1860 the Police Force was relieved of some of these extracurricular duties.

In 1869 an ordinance was initiated for better organisation and discipline of the Police Force. With a more organised Police Force, greater police surveillance of residents was provided. The Police Headquarters at the corner of St. Vincent and Sackville Streets was completed in 1876 housing approximately four hundred and fifty–two (452) men. Over the years the strength increased and other units were established, such as Traffic Branch in 1930 and Special Branch in 1959.

By 1955 the need for policewomen to deal with juveniles and female offenders had long been overdue. Under Ordinance No. 6 of 195, twelve female officers were drafted into the Force.

A Commission of Enquiry was appointed by the government to probe the administration and discipline of the Police Service. In 1966 the then Governor General assented to the Police Service Act, which enacted the Police Service Regulation 1965. This Act divided the Service into two divisions – the first and second divisions. It also introduced a change from Police Force to Police Service. This change was not only in name but also in operation. The focus shifted from being a militaristic force to a service-oriented organization.

By the 1970s the Police Service had grown in strength to 3,399 members and was placed under the portfolio of the Ministry of National Security. Mr. Francis Eustace Bernard was the first local to be appointed Commissioner of Police in 1973.

In 1881 the Police Headquarters was destroyed by fire which was caused by the kerosene oil lighting system. The Police Headquarters was destroyed for a second time in 1990, this time during the attempted coup. A new Police Administration Building was constructed at the corner of Edward and Sackville Streets the following year housing Administrative offices.

During the past two decades the strength of the service has grown to 6436 officers with several new specialist Units being introduced.

== Commissioner of Police ==
The Trinidad and Tobago Police Service is led by the Commissioner of Police. According to the Constitution of the Republic of Trinidad and Tobago 123A "the Commissioner of Police shall have the complete power to manage the Police Service and is required to ensure that the human, financial and material resources available to the Service are used in an efficient and effective manner." The Commissioner also has authority over the Special Reserve Police and another major police organisation, the Trinidad and Tobago Municipal Police Service. This authority is granted by the Municipal Corporations Act sections 50 & 51 and the Special Reserve Police Act 15:03. Some of the powers the Commissioner has over these other organisations are:

- Every Municipal Police officer shall be precepted by the Commissioner of Police
- At any time command any Municipal Police Officer to perform duties as may be required to be performed, within their Municipality.
- The general command and superintendence of the Special Reserve Police
- Call out members of the Special Reserve Police on full-time, part-time or temporary service

== Independent oversight organisations ==
=== The Police Service Commission of Trinidad and Tobago ===
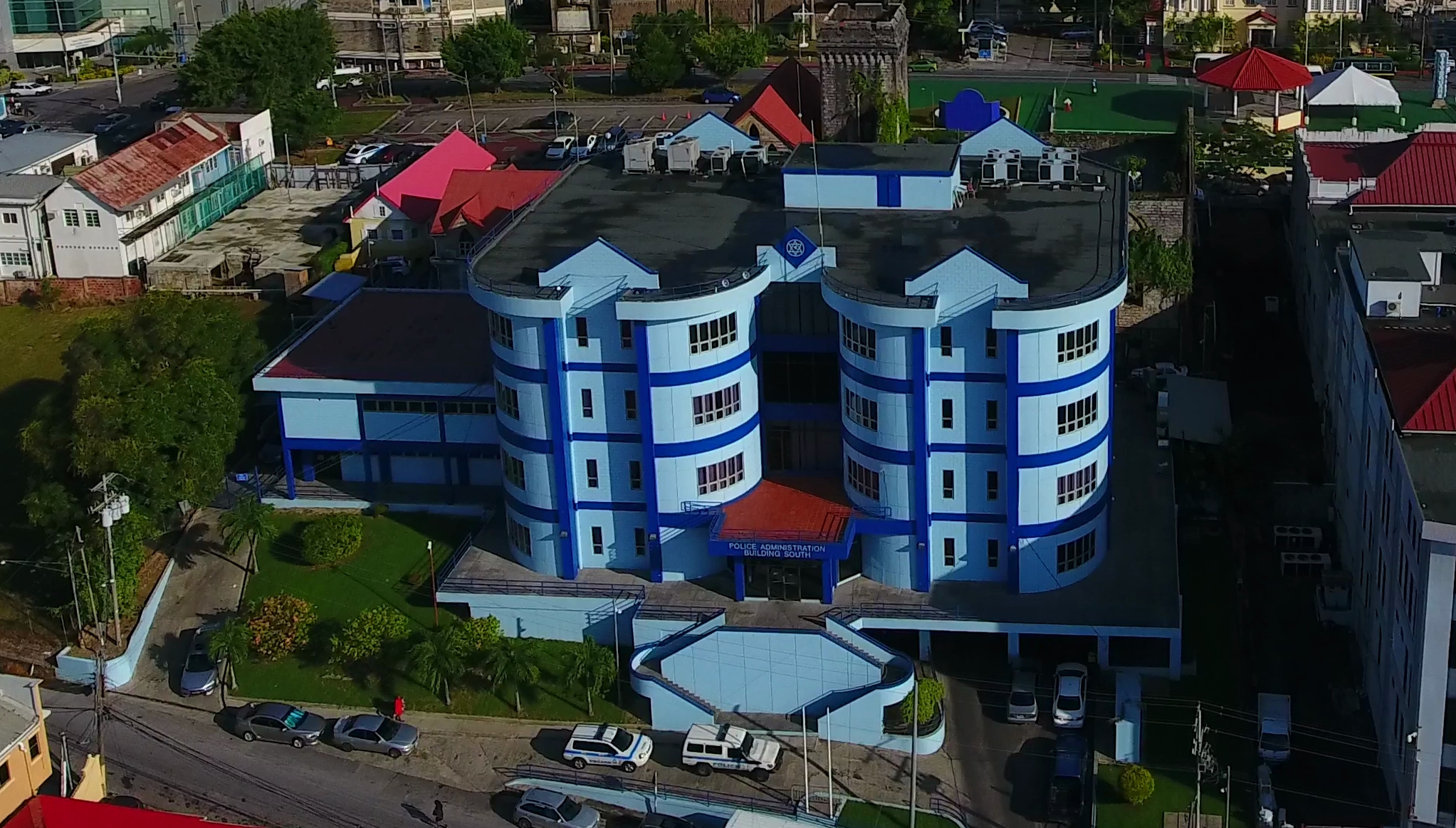
San Fernando Police Administration Building

The Commissioner is under the oversight of The Police Service Commission of Trinidad and Tobago (PSC), an independent body, who is granted this authority under Section 123 of the Constitution. They have the responsibility to nominate persons who will be appointed to hold or act in the office of Commissioner and Deputy Commissioner of Police. The appointees must be approved by The House of Representatives of Parliament of Trinidad and Tobago. The PSC also monitors the performance of the Commissioner and DCP. The PSC can remove from office and take disciplinary action on the CoP and DCP. Hear appeals from police officers about promotions or disciplinary actions taken by the Commissioner. The PSC comprises five members, a chairman and four other members, who are chosen by the President after consultation with the Prime Minister and the Leader of the Opposition and then approved by Parliament.

=== The Police Complaints Authority ===
Another independent oversight body is the Police Complaints Authority. They have the authority to investigate offences committed by police officers. These investigations can be started by either the Authority's own observations or by offences being known in the public domain. Also by complaints brought forward by the public or any other institution.

=== The Office of the Director of Public Prosecutions ===
The TTPS also interacts with another independent organisation, the Office of the Director of Public Prosecutions (DPP). The DPP is an independent office established by the constitution which grants the power to undertake criminal prosecution against persons in any court in Trinidad and Tobago. The DPP works with various Governmental, Non-Governmental and international agencies involved in prosecutions matters. The TTPS regularly consults with the DPP in criminal cases as the Director has the power to discontinue any criminal proceedings, whether started by the DPP or others, at any stage in the process. The current Director of Public Prosecution is Roger Gaspard, SC.

== Organizational Structure ==
According to the Ministry of National Security the TTPS has a total staff establishment of 7,884 regular officers, supported by a cadre of 2,561 full-time and 444 part-time Special Reserve Police Officers and 530 permanent civil servants employed via the Public Service Commission and 585 contract civilian employees. The TTPS comprises an Administrative Headquarters, 10 Police Divisions, and 24 Specialist Sections. The current Commissioner of Police (CoP) is Allister Guevarro, who was appointed on 18 June 2025, replacing Erla Harewood-Christopher, with Junior Benjamin, Suzette Martin and Natasha George as Deputy Commissioners of Police (DCP).

Commissioners of Police
Years	Name
1902– 1907	Colonel Herbert E.J.Brake C.B D.S
1907–1916	Colonel George Douglas Twain C.M
1916–1930	Colonel George Herbert May J.I.G V
1931–1938	Colonel Arthur Stephen Mavrogordato
1938–1948	Colonel Walter Angus Muller C.M.G C. St. J.
1949–1962	Colonel Eric Hammet Fairfax Beadon G.B 1
1962–1966	George Thomas Whitmore Carr C.V.G G.B.E Q.P.M E
1966–1970	James Porter Reid M.G.M Q.P
1970-1973	Francis Eustace Bernard M.G.M Q.P
1973-1978	Claud Anthony May M.G.
1978–1987	Randolph-Urich Burroughs M.O.M T
1987–1990	Louis Jim Rodriguez
1990–1996	Jules Bernard
1996–1998	Noor K. Mohammed
1998–2003	Hilton Guy
2003–2004	Everald Snaggs
2004–2007	Trevor Paul
2007–2010	James Philbert
2010–2012	Dwayne Gibbs
2012–2018	Stephen Williams
2018–2021	Gary Griffith
2021–2022	Mc Donald Jacob
2023–2025	Erla Harewood-Christopher
2025–	Allister Guevarro

=== The Executive ===
The "Updated Public Statement Of The Ministry Of National Security 2024" states that the executive of the Police Service comprises the Commissioner of Police and fourteen other Officers:

• One Commissioner of Police

- Three Deputy Commissioners:
1. Deputy Commissioner Intelligence and Investigations.
2. Deputy Commissioner Operations.
3. Deputy Commissioner Administration and Operational Support.

• Eleven Assistant Commissioners:

1. Assistant Commissioner North West.
2. Assistant Commissioner North East.
3. Assistant Commissioner South Central.
4. Assistant Commissioner Criminal Division.
5. Assistant Commissioner Tobago and Eastern.
6. Assistant Commissioner White Collar Crime.
7. Assistant Commissioner Central Intelligence Bureau.
8. Assistant Commissioner Administration.
9. Assistant Commissioner Tactical Support.
10. Assistant Commissioner Specialized Support.
11. Assistant Commissioner of Police, Special Branch

=== Ranks ===
According to the Police service Act section 7 the Trinidad and Tobago Police Service is divided into two divisions First and Second Division. The first and second schedule of the Act gives the rank structure which are: the First division from Commissioner to Assistant Superintendent and the Second division from Inspector to Constable.

- First Division
  - Commissioner
  - Deputy Commissioner
  - Assistant Commissioner
  - Senior Superintendent
  - Superintendent
  - Assistant Superintendent
- Second Division
  - Inspector
  - Sergeant
  - Corporal
  - Constable

=== Specialist Units/Sections ===
The TTPS is divided into various squads and units including:

- Anti-Corruption Investigation Bureau, formerly known as the Special Investigations Unit, which was part of the Criminal Investigations Department. The Anti-Corruption Investigation Bureau in a Gazette notice on 5 October 2025 was reported to have been back moved to the Office of the Attorney General, this is after it was move from the Office of the Attorney General to the TTPS in 2019.
- Air Support Unit
- Criminal Investigations Department
  - Fingerprint Bureau
  - Police Photography Unit
  - Robbery Squad
  - Stolen Vehicles Squad
  - Interpol Bureau
  - Anti Kidnapping Unit
  - Criminal Gang and Intelligence Unit
- Court and Process Branch
- Cyber and Social Media Unit
- Financial Investigation Branch (FIB)
- Fraud Squad
- Guard And Emergency Branch (GEB), also known as Riot Squad or Tactical Unit
- Homicide Bureau of Investigations
- Inter-Agency Task Force (IATF)
- National Special Operations Unit (NSOU)
- Canine unit
- Mounted Branch
- Organized Crime and Intelligence Unit
- Police Academy, formerly known as St. James Barracks
- Special Branch
  - Research and Analytical Unit (RAU), formerly part of the Cyber Crime Unit
- Special Reserve Police
- Trinidad And Tobago Police Band

Specialist Sections
Specialist Sections	Major Functions
Anti-Corruption Investigations Bureau	Investigates alleged acts of impropriety on the part of Justices of the Peace and all reports and allegations of corruption against Government Officials, Public Officers, Police Officers and Public and Statutory Bodies
Criminal Investigations Department	Investigates serious crimes and maintains record of offenders.
Child Protection Unit	Investigates recent matters of sexual offences, abuse, physical abuse, abandonment, neglect and ill-treatment of children
Coastal and Air Support Unit	Conduct patrols along the coastline & rivers, where intelligence reports suggest that narcotics, firearms and illegal immigrants enter.
Complaints Division	Investigate complaints against Police Officers.
Court & Process Branch	Prosecutes most offences of summary jurisdiction, maintains order within the precincts of courts, serves and executes court documents
Crime and Problem Analysis Branch	Responsible for the collection, collation, and analysis of crime data.
Cyber & Social Media Unit	Assists all investigators with technology-based investigations and operates as an Intelligence gathering tool.
E99/Emergency Response Patrol	Assists all investigators with technology-based investigations and operates as an Intelligence gathering tool.
Financial Investigations Branch	Financial Matters
Fraud Squad	Investigates fraud offences
Gender Based Violence Unit	Investigates matters related to Gender-Based Violence and Intrafamily Violence
Guard & Emergency Branch	Guard duties, high-profile exercises, escorts high risk prisoners, maintains order at industrial unrests, major events and demonstrations, and responds to emergencies in relation to public order.
Homicide Bureau of Investigations	Investigates/Supervises investigations into homicides.
Inter-Agency Task Force	Mandated to deal with crime in areas which are deemed "hot spots" for criminal activities.
Mounted & Canine Branch	Used as a Support System to perform such duties as patrols, escorts, crowd control, ceremonial duties.
National Operational Task Force (N.O.T.F)/Special Operations Unit (S.O.U)	Specialized task force used for high-risk operations.
Operations Command Centre	Primarily responsible for monitoring CCTV systems in public roadways throughout Trinidad and Tobago.
Police Academy	Responsible for recruitment of persons as police officers and continued professional training of officers.
Professional Standards Bureau	Ensuring the integrity, transparency and efficiency of all investigations, including Criminal Complaints made against Police Officers.
Special Branch	Confidential investigations, Intelligence gathering, V.I.P protection, Security Surveys
Special Investigations Unit	Investigates, prosecutes, disrupts and dismantles gangs and persons involved in serious organized crimes both nationally and transnationally
Multi-Option Police Section (MOPs)	The Multi-Operational Police Section (MOPS) is the most elite tactical unit of the Trinidad and Tobago Police Service (TTPS). Specializing in counter-terrorism and high-risk operations, MOPS supports national security through tactical response, high-profile escorts, and joint missions. The unit operates independently and partners with local and international agencies.
Traffic & Highway Patrol Branch	Patrol of the Highways and Main Roads, other duties incidental to the patrols
Transport & Telecom Branch	Maintenance of transport and telecommunication systems.

== Equipment ==
=== Uniforms ===
As of 18 October 2024, all police officers, with the exception of four operational units,(the Guard and Emergency Branch, the Multi Operational Police Section, the Inter Agency Task Force and the National Operation Task Force) have been ordered by then Police Commissioner Erla Christopher to return their police tactical kits. This change was enacted because of criminals impersonating police officers to commit crimes such as robberies, assaults, kidnappings, and even murders.

- Senior officers wear beige Khaki drill Guayabera shirts and trousers, worn with black Sam Browne Belts
- For formal dress, male officers wear white shirts and black trousers
- For formal dress, female officers wear white shirts and dark blue skirts
- Non task-force or regular officers wear, grey shirts with dark blue trousers
- Females wear dark blue shirts with skirts or pants worn with black Sam Browne Belts
- the Guard and Emergency Branch, the Multi Operational Police Section, the Inter Agency Task Force and the National Operation Task Force officers wear digital-urban camouflage kits (BDU)

=== Personal equipment ===
In August 2015, the Trinidad and Tobago Police Service signed a deal to acquire the SIG Sauer P229 and SIG Pro to replace some of their older firearms which include the Smith & Wesson M&P. The P229 will be issued all ordinary police officers, while the SIG Pro would be issued to members of the Special Branch Unit. On 17 November 2017, the Ministry of Works and Transport released a statement indicating Minister Rohan Sinanan signed an order to acquire more LIDAR speed guns for the TTPS. In 2018, the Trinidad and Tobago Police Service began planning to equip its officers with body cameras, pepper spray, and tasers. In 2019, TTPS made plans to acquire more body cameras, tasers, and pepper sprays to give to their officers.

=== Vehicles ===
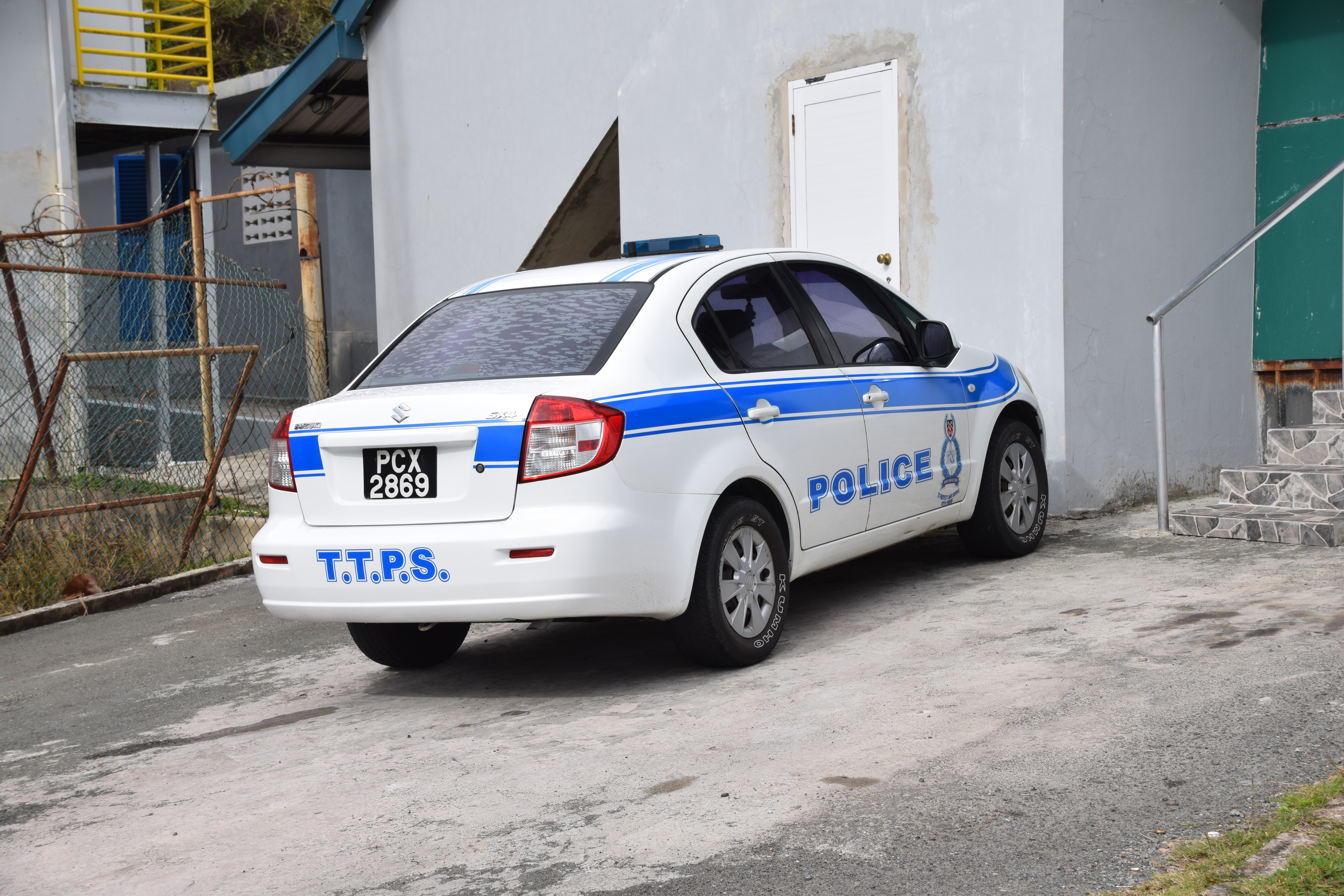
T.T.P.S Vehicle

In January 2011, it was announced that the air fleet of the former Special Anti-Crime Unit of Trinidad and Tobago (SAUTT), which was made up of four helicopters and an airship, had been absorbed into the TTPS. The Trinidad and Tobago Police Service Air Support unit formerly operated two BO 105 helicopters. During his 2025 budget presentation, Finance Minister Colm Imbert promised 2,000 new TTPS vehicles over the next three years. Of the $1 billion spent by the TTPS between 2013 and 2023, at least $299 million was spent on purchasing vehicles, $368 million on maintenance and $172 million on rentals. Between 2014 and 2023, the TTPS has spent upwards of $25 billion overall, Finance Ministry documents stated.

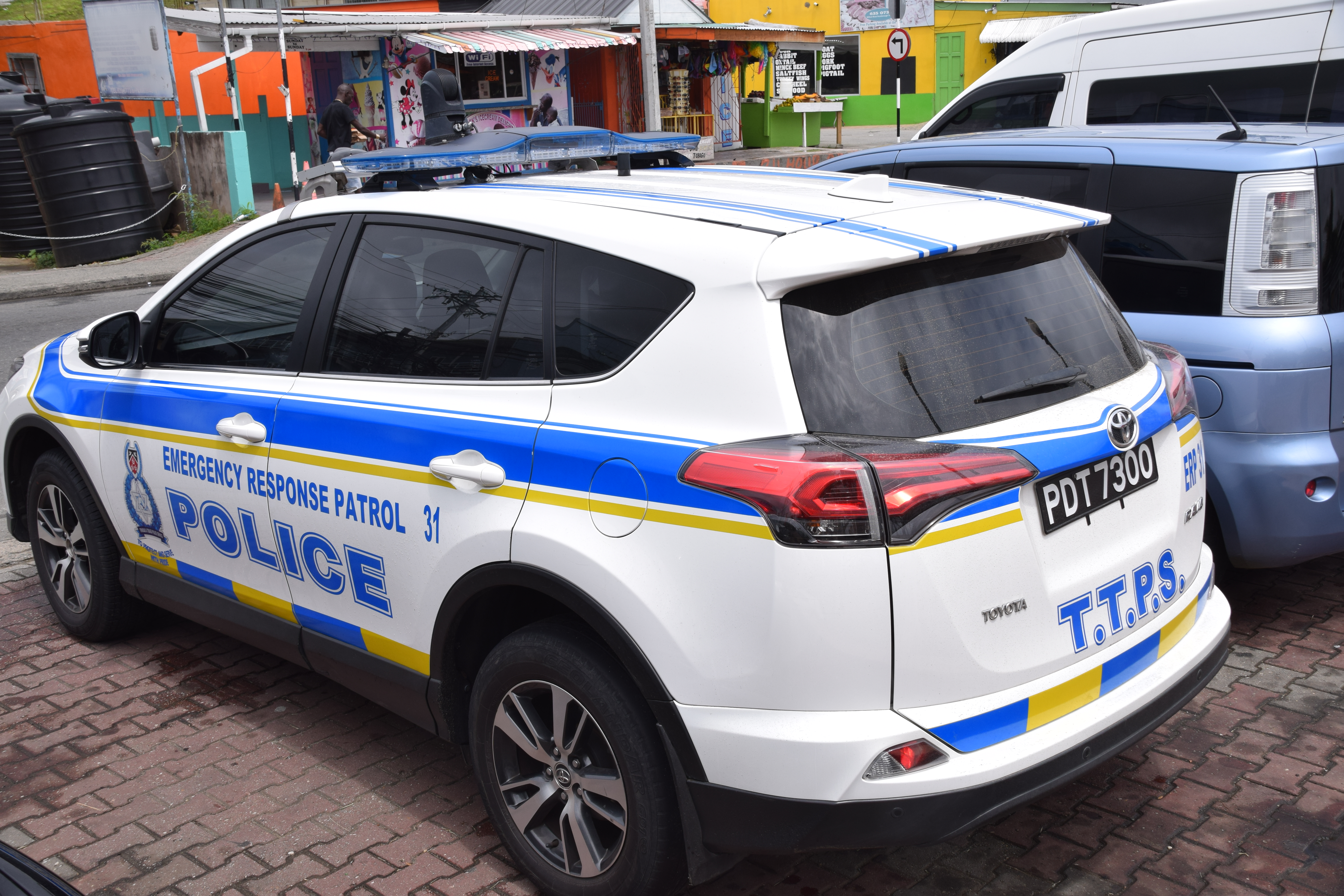
T.T.PS Emergency Response Patrol (E.R.P) (Tobago Division) Vehicle

== Budget ==
The Trinidad and Tobago Police Service receives its financial allocations in the national budget through the Ministry of Homeland Security (previously Ministry of National Security). The Ministry has two accounting officers a Permanent secretary who is responsible for the ministry and the various divisions and agencies under it, and the Commissioner of Police who is responsible for the Police service. (note 3)

The TTPS's total allocation of the National Budget for the period 2019 to 2025
Year	Total Allocation	National Budget	Percentage of National Budget	Notes
2019	TT$2,173,353,390.00	TT$54,581,467,181.00	4.0%	
2020	TT$2,374,165,652.00	TT$57,388,076,726.00	4.1%	
2021	TT$2,266,370,861.00	TT$56,498,472,820.00	4.0%	
2022	TT$2,367,769,319.00	TT$58,974,346,470.00	4.0%	
2023	TT$2,378,430,716.00	TT$69,379,928,103.00	3.4%	
2024	TT$2,657,933,900.00	TT$64,467,985,780.00	4.1%	2
2025	TT$2,598,277,200.00	TT$63,530,583,090.00	4.1%	2

Note 1: Information from page16 of a summary of expenditure for the Trinidad and Tobago Police Service (TTPS) for the period 2019–2025 By the FINANCIAL SCRUTINY UNIT of Office of the Parliament of Trinidad and Tobago.

Note 2: Quote from on page 16 in summary "For the Fiscal Years 2019–2023, actual figures were used to calculate the total allocation. However, estimates were used to calculate the total allocation for the Fiscal Years 2024 and 2025."

Note 3: Information from page 3 of the UPDATED PUBLIC STATEMENT OF THE MINISTRY OF NATIONAL SECURITY 2024

=== Fiscal 2026 Budget ===
The Fiscal 2026 Budget allocated funding for several major Trinidad and Tobago Police Service (TTPS) development projects, including:

- TTD$20 million for the procurement of an additional 3,120 Body Worn Cameras (BWC) for frontline officers.
- TTD$10 million for the implementation of the first Mobile Command Vehicle Units.
- TTD$2 million for the acquisition of six industrial/commercial-grade mapping drones for the Air Support Unit.
- TTD$6 million to expand specialised training programmes in areas such as forensic analysis, cybercrime investigation, and polygraph examination.

The Budget also supports the development of a new facility, located at Nos. 151–155 Eastern Main Road, Laventille, to support national security operations in the northern and eastern corridors. This facility is planned to accommodate the Traffic and Highway Patrol Branch, Guard and Emergency Branch, Inter-Agency Task Force, Transport Branch, and Tactical Support Units.

Additionally, a TTD$39 million plan was allocated to assist regional corporations in strengthening the Trinidad and Tobago Municipal Police Service (TTMPS) with vehicles, manpower, and equipment.

== Police Officer Deaths ==
While on-duty police officer fatalities are relatively infrequent, with ten officers killed between 1982 and 2024, off-duty deaths are more common. Notably, seven off-duty officers were killed in 2024 alone. Many of these off-duty deaths occur while officers are performing private security, often at supermarkets and retail stores, a practice requiring Commissioner's permission. In September 2014, the People's Partnership government introduced a TT$1 million death benefit grant for the families of officers killed on duty. According to Guardian Media, as of November 2024, three families have received this grant.

Police officers Killed on Duty (1982–2024)
Name	Rank	Unit	Date	Note
Krishna Banahar	Police Constable	Siparia CID	6 November 2024	Killed in a shootout with gunmen at a house in Guapo
Clarence Gilkes	Police Constable	Western Division Task Force	22 April 2022	Killed by a police-issued bullet in Rich Plain, Diego Martin.
Sherman Maynard HBM	Police Constable	Port of Spain Patrol Unit	24 July 2015	Shot and killed by escaping prisoners outside the Port of Spain Remand Facility on Upper Frederick Street. Awarded Humming Bird Medal (Bronze) (Posthumous)
Hayden Manwaring HBM	Sargeant	San Fernando CID	18 February 2013	Shot and killed when he and other officers responded to a report of a robbery in San Fernando. Awarded Humming Bird Medal (Bronze) (Posthumous)
Anil Persad	Police Constable	South Eastern Division Task Force	1 May 2011	Shot in his stomach during a shootout at a police raid on a marijuana field in the Charuma Forest, Rio Claro.
Edward Williams HBM	Inspector (Ag)	Special Branch	10 August 2004	shot dead while providing security for former President Robinson Awarded Humming Bird Medal (Gold) (Posthumous)
Kieran Parke	Police Constable	Court and Process Branch	30 December 2002	shot in his back when he visited a mini-mart on Ajodha Street, Don Miguel Road, Barataria, to serve a court summons.
Solomon McLeod	Constable	Special Reserve Police	27 July 1990	shot and killed at the north entrance of Police Headquarters during the events of the attempted coup.
Roger George	Assistant Superintendent of Police		27 July 1990	killed in the attack at the Red House
Ramkhelawan Bootan HBM	Police Constable		1982	Shot and killed when he responded to a report of a break-in at the Tamil Building on the corner of Duke and Edward Street, Port-of-Spain. Awarded the Humming Bird Medal (gold) (Posthumus)

== National Awards ==
National awards of Trinidad and Tobago received by members of the Police Service.
Year	Award	Receipent	Position	Category	Ref
1969	The Hummingbird Medal Gold	Mr. Ralph James	Police Corporal	Police Duty	
1969	The Hummingbird Medal Gold	Mr. Carlyle Missette	Police Constable	Police Duty	
1969	The Public Service Medal of Merit Gold	Mr. Randolph Burroughs	Assistant Superintendent of Police	Police Duty	
1969	The Public Service Medal of Merit Gold	Mr. James P. Reid	Commissioner of Police	Police Duty	
1969	The Public Service Medal of Merit Silver	Mr. James Mc Donald	Radio Communications Supervisor, Police Service	Communications	
1969	The Public Service Medal of Merit Silver	Miss Mary M. Scandella	Administrative Officer II, Police Service	Administration	
1974	The Hummingbird Medal Gold	Mr. Andrew Britto [Posthumously]	Former Police Corporal	Gallantry	
1980	The Trinity Cross	Mr. Randolph Burroughs – M.O.M.	Commissioner of Police	Police Service	
1991	The Trinity Cross	The Trinidad and Tobago Police Service	Statutory Body	The Preservation of Democracy and Constitutional Government	
2004	The Hummingbird Medal Gold	Mr. Edward Williams [Posthumously]	Acting Inspector of Police	Bravery, Gallantry and Loyalty	
2012	The Hummingbird Medal Silver	Roxborough Police Youth Club	Non-Governmental Organization	Community Service	
2024	The Chaconia Medal Silver	Mr. Stephen Williams	Former Acting Commissioner of Police	National Security and Public Service	
2024	The Chaconia Medal Silver	Ms. Joanne James	Retired Assistant Commissioner of Police	National Security and Public Service	
2024	The Chaconia Medal Silver	Mr. James Anthony Philbert	Retired Acting Commissioner of Police	National Security and Public Service	

== Police Service Representation and Welfare ==
The Police Service Act, Chapter 15:01 Part VII prohibits Trinidad and Tobago Police Officers from joining Trade Unions, though they are permitted to form associations. Once recognised by the Minister of Finance, these associations serve as the official body for consulting and negotiating on matters of welfare and remuneration for police officers.

The recognised body for this purpose is the Trinidad and Tobago Police Service Social and Welfare Association (TTPSSWA), which represents and negotiates for officers with the Government and the TTPS leadership.

In recent years, the TTPSSWA has engaged in significant activities on behalf of its members:

In August 2025, the TTPSSWA signed a Memorandum of Understanding (MOU) with the Trinidad and Tobago Mortgage Bank Limited (TTMB) to improve opportunities for members in areas such as investments, affordable housing, and financial literacy. In December 2025, the Association began discussions with the Chief Personnel Officer (CPO)—the officer responsible for public sector wage negotiations—to address police officers' welfare concerns and explore the resumption of salary negotiations.

The Current President of the TTPSSWA is TTPS Assistant Superintendent of Police Ishmael Pitt.

== See also ==
- Crime in Trinidad and Tobago
- Trinidad and Tobago Defence Force

=== Other CARICOM Police Services ===
- Jamaica Constabulary Force
- Barbados Police Service

=== Musical Bands ===
- Trinidad and Tobago Police Service Band
- Trinidad and Tobago Defence Force Steel Orchestra
- Jamaica Constabulary Force Band
- Barbados Police Service Band
