= Guyana Defence Force Band Corps =

Military band in Guyana

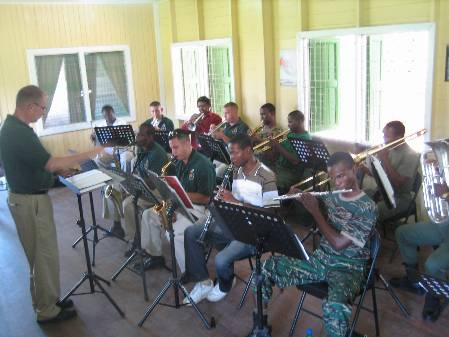
The GDF Band and the United States Army 13th Army Band.

The Guyana Defence Force (GDF) Band Corps is a military band in Guyana. It is a representative unit in the GDF whose role is to provide musical accompaniment for ceremonial functions.

The band is currently composed of the following ensembles:

- Marching Band
- Concert Band
- Steel Band
- String Band

== History ==
It was founded on 4 December 1967 as the GDF Corps of Drums which eventually was converted into a drum and bugle corps. It was under the original command of Sergeant Fitz Albert Ward. Members of the band were drawn from companies of the defunct British Guiana Volunteer Force. It was mostly brought out during regimental military parades. By late 1972, a marching band was established and unit had grown to a membership of 120 which included eight females, one of which being Sergeant Rosemary Wood, who became the GDF's first female vocalist. Three years later, the band had the following composition: marching band, corps of drums, string band, and steel band. In early 2012, the band took part in a 6-month master class presided by a Colonel from the People's Liberation Army of China. During this event, the tuba was played in the scale of G-Major for the first time in the corps' history.

In February 2013, Claude "Sonny" Ault, who served as band director for many years beginning in 1974, was found dead as a result of an alleged suicide. Ault was responsible for nationalizing British military marches.

== Steel Band ==
The GDF Steel Band was established in 1970, three years after the original band was founded. It was led by Corporal Archie McAllister It is currently one of the six top steel bands in Guyana. It often performed at mixed events with the rest of the corps, and particularly the corp's of drums.

== Frontline band ==
The GDF Frontline band is the string orchestra of the band, established in 1974 as the GDF String Band led by Andre Jackson, accompanied by four members. It was followed by the creation of the World-Wind String Band in October 1975. It received high acclaim in both Guyanese and international circles. It was succeeded by Frontline Band in 1982.

== See also ==
- Cuban Revolutionary Armed Forces Military Bands Department
- Trinidad and Tobago Defence Force Steel Orchestra
- Jamaica Military Band
- Fanfare du Palais National
