= Trinidad and Tobago Police Service Band =

The Trinidad and Tobago Police Service Band is a police musical unit in the Republic of Trinidad and Tobago, located in the capital of the Port of Spain. It was founded in 1866 to provide support to local militia and police units, in absence of an active military band. In 1964, Guillermo Antonio Prospect (also known in English speaking circles as Anthony Prospect) formed the first police steel band. A notable member of the band was Lieutenant Joseph Nathaniel Griffith, who later served as bandmaster of the Royal Saint Lucia Police Band and was previously with the Antiguan Police Band. Another member was Superintendent Enrique Moore, who was present with the band when it went to a tattoo in Berlin in 2003.

The band, like other Trinidadian marching bands, owns a steel band. The band maintains a rehearsal space in the capital. It was created and designed by Caribbean Entertainment Technologies, which is a group of broadcast and electrical engineers. There are four rooms located within the compound: a choir room, a steel-pan room, a practice room, and an orchestra room.

In 2017, the largest promotion of band members in the presence of the Commissioner of Police took place, with 23 constables either being promoted to the rank of Corporal or Sergeant.

== See also ==
- Jamaica Constabulary Force Band
- Barbados Police Service
- Barbados Police Service Band
- Fanfare du Palais National
- Trinidad and Tobago Defence Force Steel Orchestra
