= Allister Guevarro =

Trinidad and Tobago Commissioner of Police

Allister Guevarro is a Trinidad and Tobago police officer who has been the Commissioner of Police of the Trinidad and Tobago Police Service (TTPS) since June 18, 2025, having succeeded Erla Harewood-Christopher.

== Career ==
Guevarro graduated from the police academy in 1996 and has served in different divisions of the TTPS such as the Criminal Investigations Department. Most notably the Special Branch, an elite unit tasked with high-profile criminal investigations and the protection of top-level officials, including the Prime Minister and the Minister of Homeland Security, where he served as acting Senior Superintendent.

Guevarro was one of three persons assigned to the committee that investigated the cause of the February 2022 nationwide blackout, a failure of the entire electricity grid in Trinidad that lasted twelve and a half hours.

Guevarro was approved to become Commissioner of Police on 13 June 2025, following a unanimous vote in the House of Representatives.

== Qualifications ==
Guevarro has many qualifications including an MBA in leadership, entrepreneurship and innovation from Anglia Ruskin University he has also trained at the University of Cambridge in evidence-based policing, Arthur Lok Jack School of Business in environmental criminology and crime analysis and Cipriani College of Labour and Co-operative Studies in security administration and management.

He has further received training at institutions including the Federal Emergency Management Agency, UN Counter Terrorism Centre, International Criminal Policing Organisation and Federal Criminal Policing Office.
