= RBPF =

The initials RBPF may refer to:

- Royal Bahamas Police Force
- Royal Barbados Police Force (now known as the Barbados Police Service)
- Royal Brunei Police Force
