= Jamaica, Land We Love =

National anthem of Jamaica

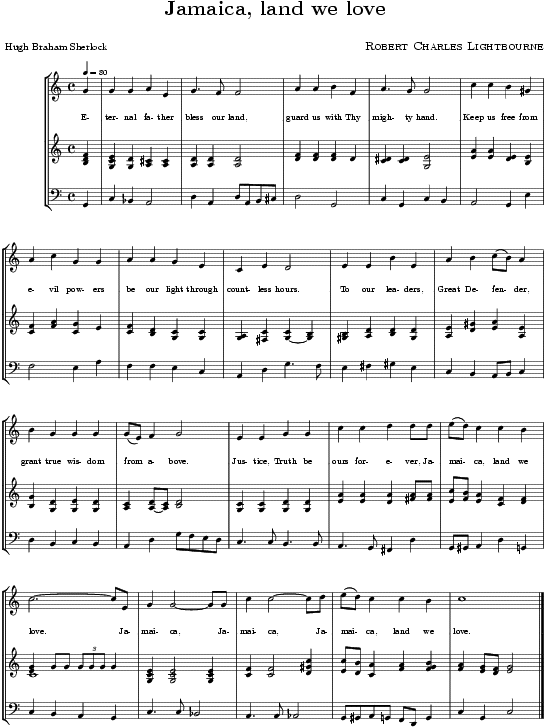
- National anthem of Jamaica
- Lyrics: Hugh Sherlock, July 1962
- Music: Robert Lightbourne (arranged by Mapletoft Poulle), July 1962
- Adopted: 19 July 1962

Audio sample
- U.S. Navy Band instrumental version (one verse): file; help

"Jamaica, Land We Love" is the national anthem of Jamaica, officially adopted in July 1962. It was chosen after a competition from September 1961 to 31 March 1962, in which the lyrics of the national anthem were selected by Jamaica's Houses of Parliament. When Jamaica was granted independence on 6 August 1962, "Jamaica, Land We Love" continued to be officially used as the national anthem.

== History ==
Prior to the declaration of the independence of Jamaica, Jamaica was made a West Indies Federation province of the British West Indies, still under the rule of the United Kingdom. The nation entered the federation under the rule of Premier Norman Manley, who also made various constitutional amendments to allow the process of decolonisation to rapidly take place. These amendments also allowed the country to have more self-governing powers and permitted the formation of a cabinet led by a premier. Premier Norman Manley's participation in the West Indies Federation was unpopular and led to the independence of the country on 6 August 1962, and the national anthem selected in July 1962 was officially used from that date.

In September 1961, the leading People's National Party announced a competition to write the lyrics of Jamaica's future national anthem, which would be judged by selected members of Jamaica's Houses of Parliament. The competition received almost 100 script entries, and the competition closed on 31 March 1962, after this ending date was decided on 17 March. The Houses of Parliament were given two options of anthems to vote for on 19 July 1962, and a script was chosen with an overwhelming majority. The winning script was written by Reverend Hon. Hugh Sherlock, the music was composed by Hon. Robert Lightbourne, and the anthem was arranged by Mapletoft Poulle and Christine Alison Poulle. The Jamaican national anthem, "Jamaica, Land We Love," was originally performed at the National Stadium in Kingston, on August 6, 1962, during the official independence ceremonies.

== Use ==
=== Salutes ===
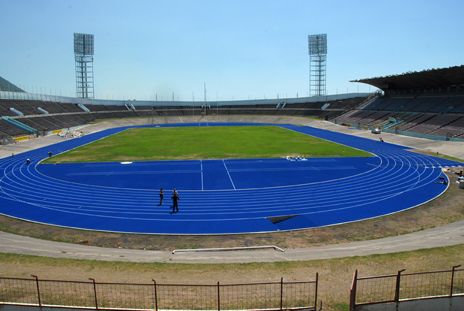
Jamaica's anthem, "Jamaica, Land We Love," was first played at Kingston's National Stadium on August 6, 1962, during the country's independence celebrations.

Everyone should stand at attention for the National Anthem, with males removing their caps. Those in uniform should salute. The Governor-General and Prime Minister's arrival and departure will be marked by the performance or playing of the opening verse of the National Anthem. Furthermore, singing the National Anthem should be incorporated into the process of raising and lowering the flag at the beginning and end of each school year, as well as during Independence Day celebrations.

=== Other uses ===
The anthem has appeared in television shows and documentaries on Jamaican culture and history. It is commonly used for national festivals and television broadcasts, including Independence Day and athletic events starring Jamaican athletes. During sign-off sequences in Jamaica, television and radio stations customarily play the national anthem "Jamaica, Land We Love." This custom honors an era when broadcasting was not a 24-hour operation, with stations suspending operations overnight. As an example, Television Jamaica and Radio Jamaica are recognized for incorporating the national anthem into their sign-off routines. At the conclusion of their daily broadcasts, these stations traditionally play the anthem, marking a formal end to their programming before they cease transmission.

== Lyrics ==
I
Eternal Father, bless our land
Guard us with Thy mighty hand
Keep us free from evil powers
Be our light through countless hours

To our leaders, Great Defender,
Grant true wisdom from above
Justice, truth be ours forever
Jamaica, land we love

Jamaica, Jamaica,
Jamaica, land we love.

II
Teach us true respect for all
Stir response to duty's call
Strengthen us the weak to cherish
Give us vision lest we perish

Knowledge send us, Heavenly Father,
Grant true wisdom from above
Justice, truth be ours forever
Jamaica, land we love

Jamaica, Jamaica,
Jamaica, land we love.
