= 13th Army Band =

The 13th Army Band
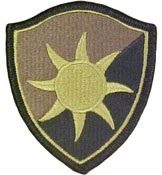
- Shoulder Sleeve Insignia for 13th Army Band
- Active: 25 February 1930 – present
- Country: United States of America
- Branch: United States Army
- Garrison/HQ: Miramar, Florida
- March: The Army Goes Rolling Along (official hymn)
- Website: 13tharmyband.army.mil

Commanders
- Current commander: CW2 Rafael J. Napoles (2023-current)

The 13th Army Band is a United States National Guard military band stationed in Miramar, Florida. The unit is a part of the Florida National Guard, headquartered at St. Augustine. According to retired Adjutant General Major General Michael A. Calhoun, the band is the "best kept secret in the National Guard. CW2 Rafael J. Napoles directs the band, which provides musical support for military functions, civic events, and air shows.

== Lineage and honors ==
- Organized and federally recognized on February 25, 1930, in the Florida National Guard as the Band Section, Headquarters Battery, 265th Coast Artillery at Miami
- Reorganized and redesignated on March 1, 1940, as the 265th Coast Artillery
- Inducted into Federal service on January 6, 1941, at Miami
- Reorganized and redesignated on May 18, 1944, as the 96th Army Ground Forces Band
- Inactivated on October 23, 1945, at Fort Leonard Wood, Missouri
- Redesignated on July 5, 1946, as the 51st Infantry Division Band
- Reorganized and federally recognized on April 15, 1947, at Miami
- Location changed on April 15, 1959, to North Miami
- Reorganized and redesignated on February 15, 1963, as the 13th Army Band and relieved from assignment to the 51st Infantry Division
- Location changed in 2006 to Pembroke Pines
- Location changed in 2015 to Fort Lauderdale
- Location changed in 2017 to Miramar

== Commanders ==
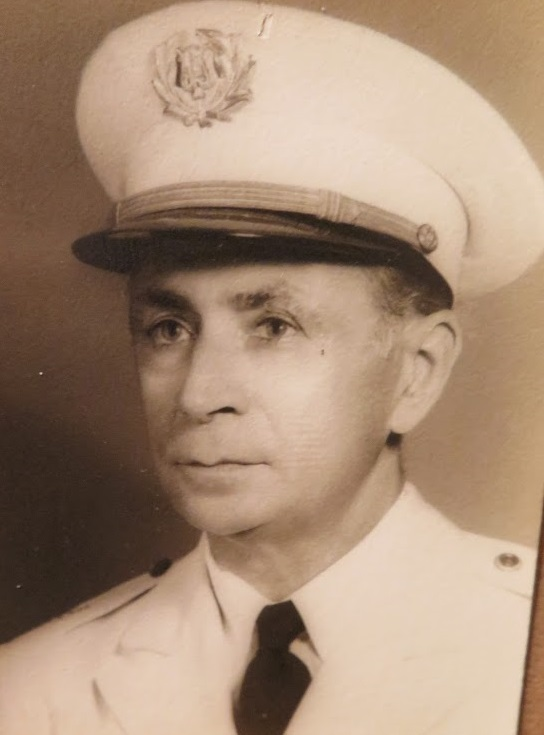
WO Caesar LaMonaca (1930–1941)

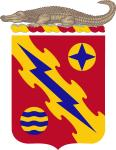
Lt Robert E Hall (Jan 1941 - 1944)

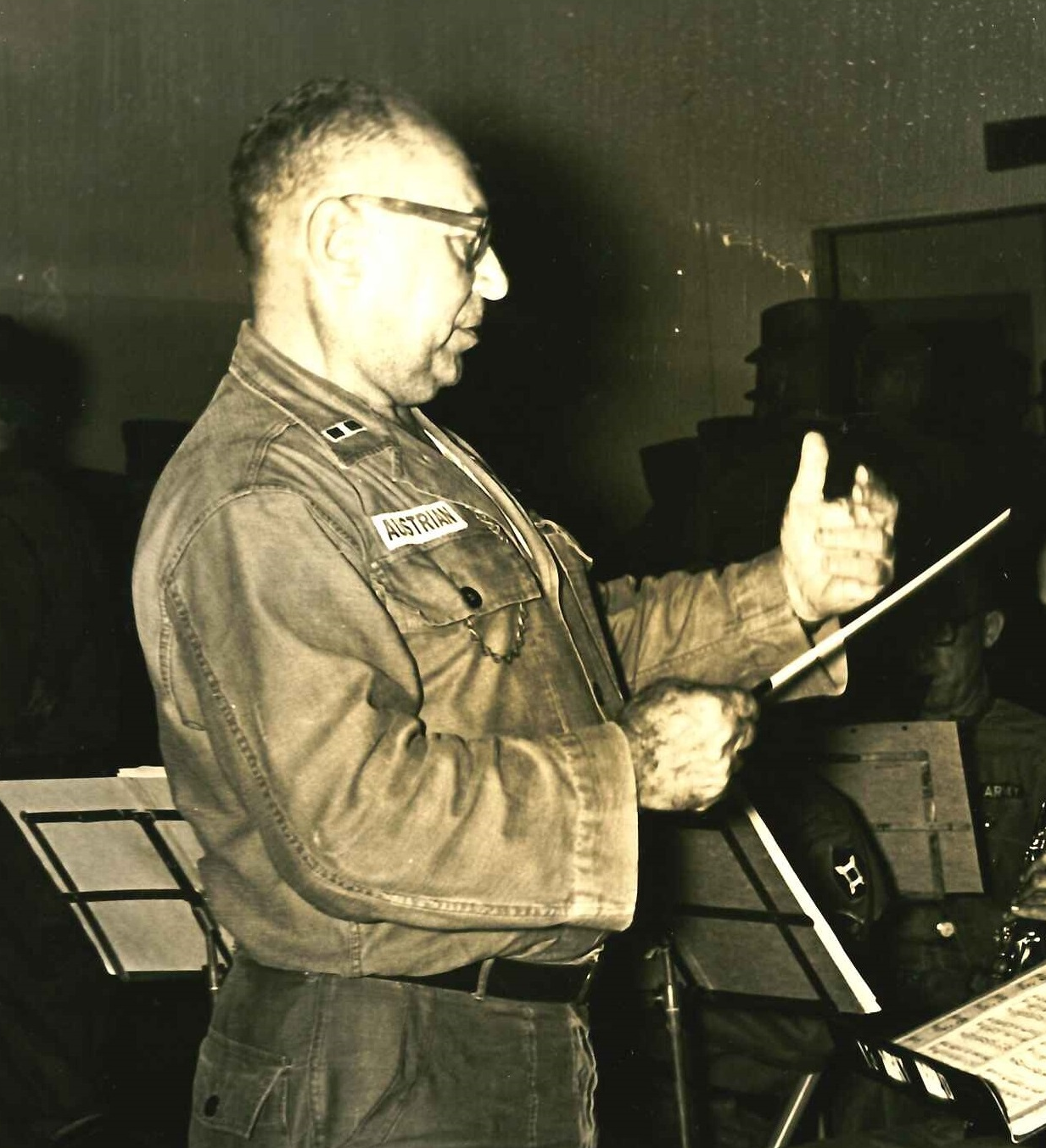
CWO Murray Austrian (15 APR 1947 – 14 NOV 1963)

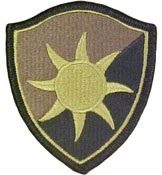
CW4 Everett F. Nichols (15 NOV 1963 – 28 APR 1970)

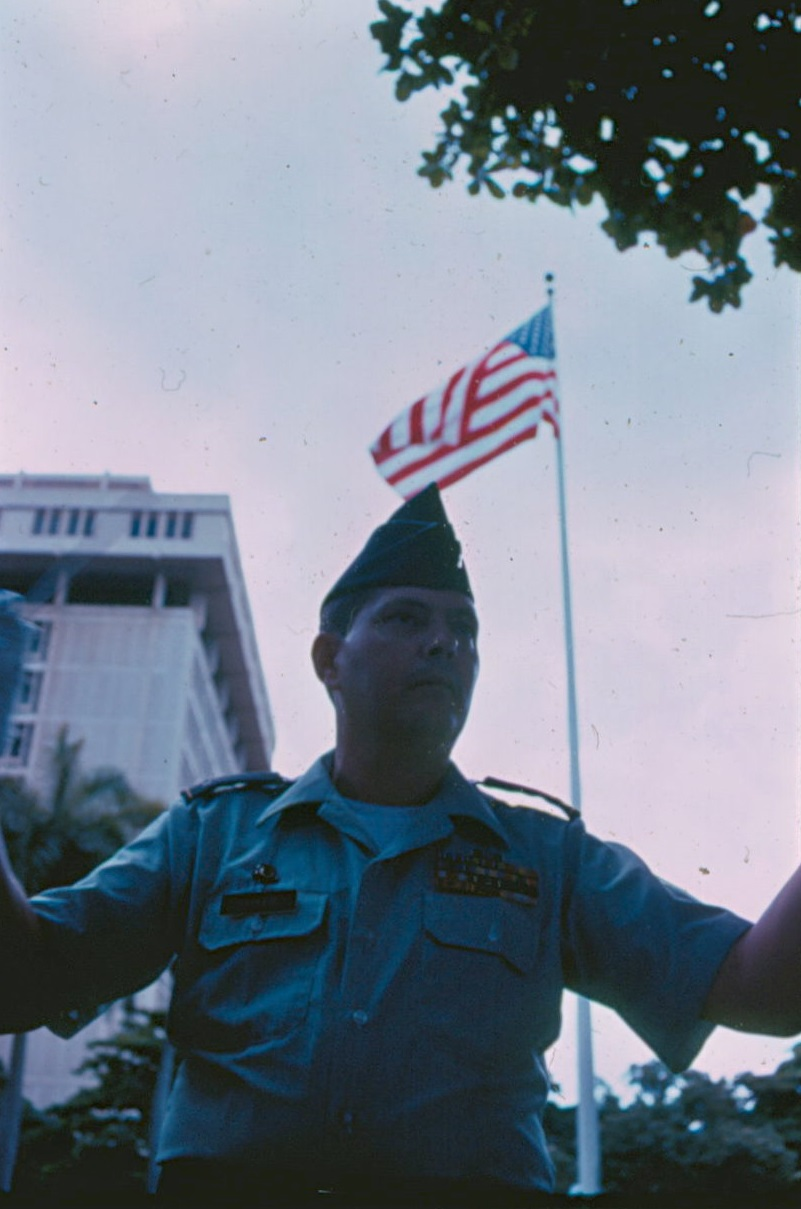
CW5 Douglas A. Phifer (3 APR 1978 – 30 SEP 2010)

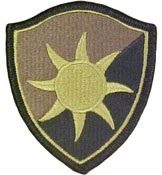
CW4 Stephen K. Rivero (2010– JUN 2023)

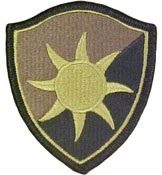
CW2 Rafael J. Napoles (JUN 2023-present)

== Notable members ==
- WO Caesar LaMonaca

== Historical Narrative ==
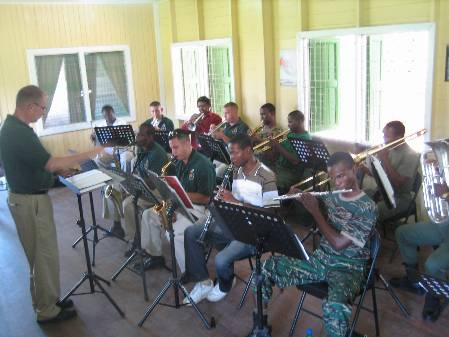
The Guyana Defence Force Band Corps and the 13th Army Band.

The 13th Army Band has a lineage dating back to 1930, when it was organized as the band section of the 265th Air Defense Artillery Regiment in Miami, then the 265th Coast Artillery. The 265th Air Defense Artillery Regiment Band supported harbor security operations in Fort Crockett, Texas and Fort Greely, Alaska through World War II. In 1944, it was re-designated as the 96th Army Ground Forces Band, which served until its deactivation in 1945.

In 1946, the band was re-designated as the 51st Infantry Division Band. The 51st Infantry Division was composed of National Guardsmen from South Carolina and Florida, and the band usually performed Annual Training with the infantry at bases such as Fort Polk and Fort McClellan.

In 1947, the band was activated for flood relief in Fort Lauderdale and for the opening of Everglades National Park.

In 1952, the band earned the Eisenhower Trophy for being "the most outstanding company sized unit in the Florida National Guard."

In 1957, the band moved to the North Miami Armory.

From 17–26 March 1960, the band was activated for flood relief in the Tampa area.

In 1963, the band reorganized and was redesignated as the 13th Army Band of the Florida National Guard. With the entire state of Florida as its Area of Operations, the band took missions from the Goodwill Ball in downtown Miami in 1970, to gubernatorial inaugurations every four years in Tallahassee, and everything in between. The band has performed in hundreds of civic parades, military pass and reviews, and became a staple at the annual OCS graduations at Camp Blanding and the National Guard Association Conferences, held around the state.

In 1973, the band enlisted one of the first females into the Florida National Guard, Susan Seaman. Previously, women were only allowed in the Guard as Army nurses.

In 1975 and 1976, the band had a variety of high-profile performances in celebration of the National Bicentennial, the US' 200th birthday. In the early 1980s, elements of the band were mobilized for civil missions during the McDuffie riots and the Mariel boatlift. In 1985, Voice of America requested the band play a series of concerts at a relay station in Costa Rica. The band performed in neighboring Panama and Costa Rica. Later that year, the band was invited to perform for the 10th anniversary ceremony of NGPEC in Arkansas. In 1987, the 13th Army Band was awarded the Army National Guard Superior Unit Award. The following year, the band was invited to Washington, D.C. to perform for the Association of the United States Army.

In 1990, the band traveled to the Dominican Republic and to Morocco on cultural exchange assignments. In Santo Domingo, the band was mobbed wherever they went and treated as stars after performing on a local television variety show. The Moroccan visit supported State Department employees and included patriotic Fourth of July receptions at American embassies in Rabat and Casablanca.

In 1992, South Florida was devastated by Hurricane Andrew. The band was immediately activated to organize relief supply distribution to affected civilians. As soon as enough troops were in place to continue that mission, the band began performing for thousands of Floridians who were homeless or without power.

Throughout the 1990s and continuing today, the band has supported requests from SOUTHCOM as well as other military branches including the Coast Guard. The 13th is one of a very few National Guard units authorized to wear the Coast Guard Meritorious Team Commendation ribbon.

In the early 2000s, bandsmen volunteered for border patrol operations and counter-drug assignments among other operations during the global war on terrorism. The 13th Army Band was awarded the Adjutant General's Trophy in 2004 for superior performance as a unit.

The band was crucial in the dedication of the World War II memorial in Tallahassee in 2005. Bandsmen, and particularly buglers, have worked constantly at cemeteries throughout Florida as part of the Military Funeral Honors teams. They give the last solemn farewell to fallen veterans.

Throughout 2005, Florida was hit with a rash of hurricanes. The 13th Army Band was partially activated for Hurricane Frances and fully activated for Hurricane Wilma.

During Hurricane Wilma recovery efforts, the band offloaded over 180 tractor-trailers full of relief supplies. A band detachment worked in the Florida Keys distributing over 10,000 meals and countless pounds of ice and water.

In 2007, 13th Army Band personnel performed in the Super Bowl XLI pre-game show, before a live audience of over 74,000 and a television audience of over 93 million people.

The band earned an Army Superior Unit Award for support of the 2008 Presidential Inauguration. Later that year, a group of bandsmen traveled to St. Kitts to participate in a state partnership training exchange and perform at several celebratory events.

In 2009, several members of the band volunteered for deployment in support of Operation Iraqi Freedom.

In 2011 and 2012, band Subject Matter Expert Teams deployed to Guyana in South America to help develop relations between the Guyana Defense Forces Military Band and the Florida National Guard and foster goodwill with the Guyanese citizens. In two engagements, the band supported State Department personnel stationed in Guyana with patriotic concerts and performed multiple community outreach missions, earning numerous accolades.

The 13th Army Band performed a cultural exchange aboard a Chilean Navy training ship, Esmeralda, docked at the Port of Miami in 2016. Later that year, Chief Stephen K. Rivero was invited to support the Tumon Music Festival during a visit to Guam.

In 2017, the unit was activated in response to Hurricane Irma, assisting with emergency operations throughout Florida.

Unit members have supported DSCA operations in support of Hurricane Michael and Hurricane Dorian and have performed at the Miami Marathon in 2019 and 2020.

In 2020, the unit was asked to volunteer for Coronavirus disease 2019 response and activated most of its members. They helped set up the Hard Rock Stadium testing center in the first few days of Florida's military response to the crisis.

The 13th Army Band Commander has been tasked by the National Guard Bureau to perform evaluation and assistance visits to Army Bands. CW3 Stephen K. Rivero, is one of only six officers sitting on the Army Bands Advisory Council, which assists in planning the future of National Guard bands.

== Decorations ==
Ribbon	Award	Date	Streamer embroidered	Order No.
ribbon	Army Superior Unit Award (Army)	2008	None	HRC Permanent Order 313-04

OTHER DECORATIONS

- Eisenhower Trophy - 1952
- Governor's Trophy - 1961
- Pershing Trophy - 1961,1962

== Ensembles ==
The nature of military operations, and the requirements of modern military musicians specifically, require the band to play simultaneous engagements. Currently, the band fields several ensembles which can operate at multiple sites independently:

- Concert Band
- Big Band
- Latin Band
- Brass Band
- Woodwind Quintet
- Brass Quintet
- Drum and Fife
- Jazz Combo
- Rock Band

== See also ==
- United States military bands
- Florida National Guard
