= Barbados Police Service Band =

The Barbados Police Service Band, previously known as the Royal Barbados Police Band part of the Barbados Police Service, has been a prominent musical group in Barbados since its foundation in 1889 and is one of the oldest police bands in the world. Police bands are common throughout the Anglophone Caribbean, and are known for playing a wide variety of Caribbean music, as well as marches and popular songs.

== History ==
When the RBPF was first established it was with a complement of 19 serving Policemen. At that time they wore regulation police uniforms, and their selection was due to the love for music and the knowledge of the art. The first Bandmaster was Capt. Willocks who came to the Island with the 2nd. Battalion of the West Riding Regiment, as its Bandmaster. In 1914, Sergeant Major Emmanuel Bennernagel of the British Guiana Militia Band was appointed as Bandmaster, and took it on its first overseas tour to St. Lucia in 1945. He was also responsible for instituting the Band Cadet system of recruitment. Captain Charles E. Raison replaced Sergeant Major Bennernagel in 1946, and since then the band has had a number of Directors of Music which included Lieutenant William Griesley and Lieutenant Joseph Griffith. Since December 2012, Superintendent Keith Ellis has held the post of Director of Music.

In 1957 the music of the Barbados National Anthem was re-arranged by Inspector Prince Cave. He gave the Anthem a more sustained harmony while at the same time retaining the original tune. In 2016 for the 50th Anniversary of Independence, Constable Steve Sobers arranged a special descant to the 2nd verse of the anthem. The band today is made up of 54 Officers, men and women, along with 10 band apprentices and tours extensively, visiting countries like the United Kingdom, Virgin Islands, Suriname, St. Kitts, Grenada, Canada and Germany.

On 30 November 2021, the band was renamed the Barbados Police Service Band to reflect the transition of Barbados from a monarchy to a republic.

== See also ==
- Trinidad and Tobago Police Service Band
- Trinidad and Tobago Defence Force Steel Orchestra
- Jamaica Constabulary Force Band

== Notes ==
- Carib Zone
- Calypso World
