= Jamaica Independence Act 1962 =

Act of the Parliament of the United Kingdom

Jamaica Independence Act 1962 (Note: Section 5.)
- Act of Parliament
- Parliament of the United Kingdom
- Long title: An Act to make provision for, and in connection with, the attainment by Jamaica of fully responsible status within the Commonwealth.
- Citation: 10 & 11 Eliz. 2. c. 40
- Territorial extent: United Kingdom

Dates
- Royal assent: 19 July 1962
- Commencement: 6 August 1962 (Note: Section 1(1).)

Other legislation
- Amends: West Indies Act 1962
- Amended by: Emergency Laws (Re-enactments and Repeals) Act 1964; Finance Act 1969; Statute Law (Repeals) Act 1969; Civil Aviation Act 1971; Statute Law (Repeals) Act 1977; Interpretation Act 1978; International Organisations Act 1981; British Nationality Act 1981; Family Law Act 1986; Copyright, Designs and Patents Act 1988; Merchant Shipping Act 1995; Commonwealth Act 2002; Armed Forces Act 2006

Status: Amended

Text of statute as originally enacted

Revised text of statute as amended

Text of the Jamaica Independence Act 1962 as in force today (including any amendments) within the United Kingdom, from legislation.gov.uk.

The Jamaica Independence Act 1962 (10 & 11 Eliz. 2. c. 40) is an act of the Parliament of the United Kingdom that granted independence to Jamaica with effect from 6 August 1962.

As a result of the act, Jamaica became the first English-speaking country in the West Indies to achieve full independence from the United Kingdom. At independence, Jamaica became a member of the Commonwealth of Nations as a Commonwealth realm; prior to this, Jamaica had been part of the West Indies Federation from 1958. With the independence of Jamaica, the Cayman Islands reverted from being a self-governing territory of Jamaica to direct British rule.

== Background to enactment ==
The bill was first presented in the House of Commons of the United Kingdom as the Jamaica Independence Bill on 22 May 1962, by Secretary of State for the Colonies, Reginald Maudling. It was passed in the House of Commons after a third reading and committee on 29 June 1962. It entered the House of Lords on 2 July 1962 and was read by Michael Hicks Beach, 2nd Earl St Aldwyn on 5 July 1962. It was passed in the House of Lords on 16 July 1962 without any amendments.

The bill received royal assent on 19 July 1962, from Queen Elizabeth II. As per section one of the act, it came into force on 6 August 1962, which is marked annually in Jamaica as Independence Day.

== See also ==
- Commonwealth of Nations
- Monarchy of Jamaica
