= Caesar LaMonaca =

Italian musician

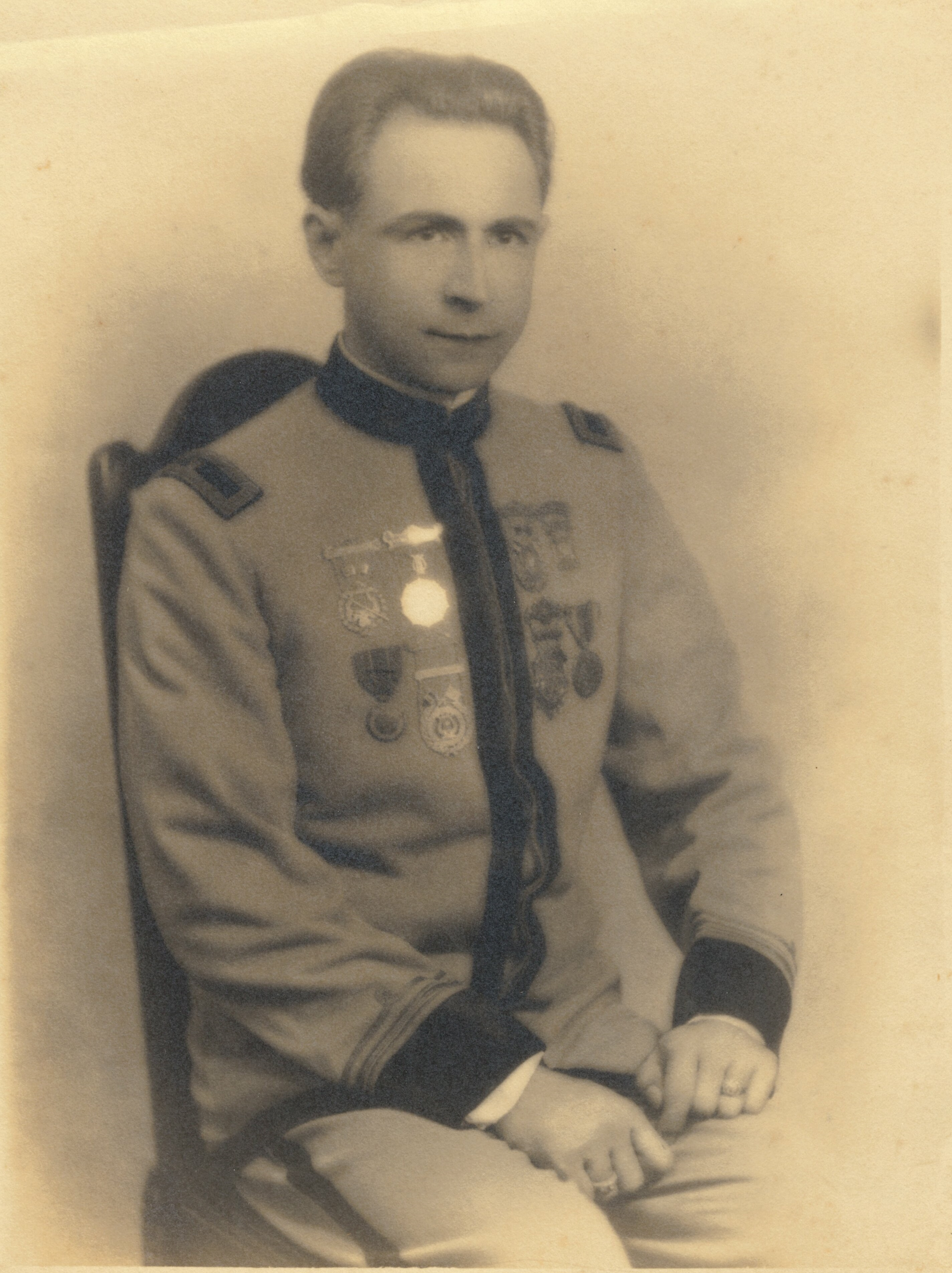
La Monaca in a photo from 1929

Caesar LaMonaca (1886–1983) was a musician, composer, arranger and band leader who immigrated from Italy and worked mostly in Florida throughout the 20th Century.

== Early life ==
As a child in San Severo, Italy, like his older brother Joseph, he found he had an affinity for music. By age nine, he became good enough as a French horn and trumpet player that he was able to join a professional concert band touring Europe. Joseph LaMonaca was playing flute in the Philadelphia Orchestra and was able to help Caesar find a gig with Giuseppe Creatore's Italian Band when Caesar was 14. Caesar came to America and within two years he was conducting the Creatore Band.

== Career ==
After a few years on the road, LaMonaca settled in California and was able to bring his mother to the U.S. He led multiple groups until he was drafted for World War I. After the war, LaMonaca performed everywhere from Santa Barbara to San Francisco and had recurring gigs at the Greek Theater in Berkeley. After touring with various ensembles, LaMonaca married settled down in Rhode Island where his son, Caesar Vito was born.

The family moved to Hollywood, Florida so Cesar could conduct the band, surviving the Great Hurricane of 1926 in a small house in Ft Lauderdale. Shortly thereafter, he was director of the Miami municipal band at the Roman Pools.

Soon LaMonaca was working with the local Boy Scouts and helped stand up their drum and bugle corps (classic), as he did later in Miami.

In 1926, LaMonaca outbid the famed Arthur Pryor for a series of waterfront concert gigs in Miami, but that season was interrupted by the Great Miami Hurricane. LaMonaca's Hollywood band immediately began to play at area hospitals for victims of the hurricane.

After Miami rebuilt the Bayfront Park Amphitheater, in 1927, his band gave concerts there for the next 50 years. In 1929, he became director of the Harvey Seeds American Legion Post Drum and Bugle Corps.

Under his musical direction Harvey Seeds won three national championships and a number of other accolades.

In 1930, LaMonaca volunteered to conduct the 265th Coast Artillery Band of the Florida National Guard, a military unit which was the predecessor of today's 13th Army Band, Florida National Guard. The band adopted LaMonaca's style of mixing classical music with marches and modern songs. The Coast Artillery later became the 265th Air Defense Artillery Regiment. This was the only Florida military band that survived the reorganization of the armed forces after WWII. LaMonaca retired from the military in 1941, as the unit was federalized for active duty. The band served in Texas and Alaska. LaMonaca noted in an interview that the Army didn't pay enough to keep up his familial responsibilities.

In 1931, he formed the Greater Miami Boys Drum and Bugle Corps, which he headed until 1955. That drum corps traveled the world and won several competitions, apart from the Harvey Seeds, Legion corps. At one point the depression-era WPA was used creatively to assist out-of-work musicians and as many as 14 teachers were paid to assist the drum corps, which swelled to over 360 members.

LaMonaca is also cited as the creator of the West Palm Beach Municipal Band, which he led until 1930.

He was not only a great conductor, but an educator. From 1946 to 1955, he organized and directed a youth symphony that performed twice weekly during the summer months at the Bayfront Park bandshell while his symphonic band was on hiatus. In 1954, LaMonaca honored the memory of bandleader Glenn Miller by conducting Miller's music at his weekly concert when the bandleader's movie premiered in Miami.

LaMonaca's legacy was not only that of a great entertainer, but someone who was a keystone of South Florida history. His concerts remain in the memory of many Miamians who didn't have television and went to Bayfront Park on Friday and Saturday nights for his concerts. His students went on to both teach and perform. His students in the Greater Miami Boys Drum Corps included Wade Buff and Gene Adkinson, who later formed The Dreamers. His own son, Caesar V. LaMonaca, attended Juilliard and played French Horn with the New Orleans and Houston Symphonies, before moving on to become a piano tuner. Canadian Brass member Martin Hackleman was a student of his.

During his final concert at Bayfront, the elder Lamonaca fell from the podium and broke his hip. He never conducted in public again.

== Sources ==
- Morales, Ralph (2018). Harvey W Seeds American Legion Post #29 History. Miami: Harvey Seeds Press. ISBN 978-0692128497.
- Miami History Podcast

== See also ==
- Notable members of the American Legion
- Bandmaster
