= Mona, Jamaica =

Mona
- Community
- Location within Jamaica
- Coordinates: 18.0091821°N 76.7494583°W
- Country: Jamaica
- City: Kingston
- Time zone: UTC-5 (EST)
- Postal code: Kingston 7

Mona is a neighbourhood in southeastern Saint Andrew Parish, approximately eight kilometres from Kingston, Jamaica. A former sugarcane plantation, it is the site of a reservoir serving the city of Kingston and the main campus of the University of the West Indies.

== Name ==
The neighbourhood is named for the former Mona Estate.

== Geography ==
Mona is bordered by the neighbouring communities of Liguanea, Hope Pastures, Beverly Hills, August Town, and Papine.

=== Mona Reservoir ===
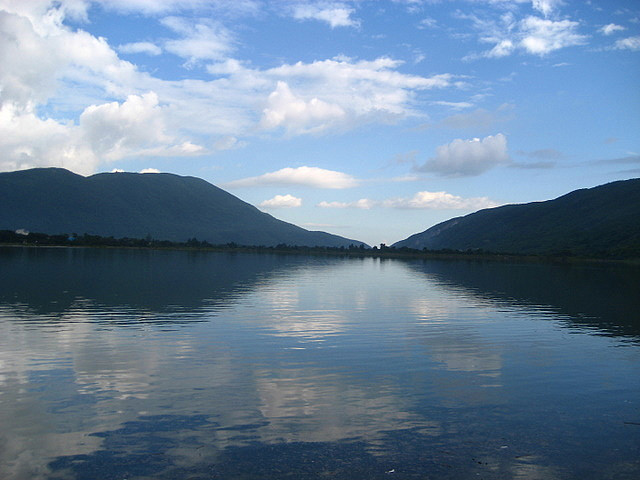
Mona Reservoir

The Mona Reservoir replaces the system of aqueducts that were used at the sugar plantations and then the city of Kingston. The reservoir is now the main water source for Kingston and a recreational area for hikers.

== History ==
Much of Mona was on what was earlier part of estate holdings awarded to British officers who took over Jamaica from the Spanish in the 1655.

=== Mona Estate ===
The Mona Estate was once a large sugar plantation with water supplied via stone aqueducts. Evidence of its existence can be found in the ruins of water wheel, mills, and aqueducts on the Mona campus of the University of the West Indies.

=== Gibraltar Camp ===
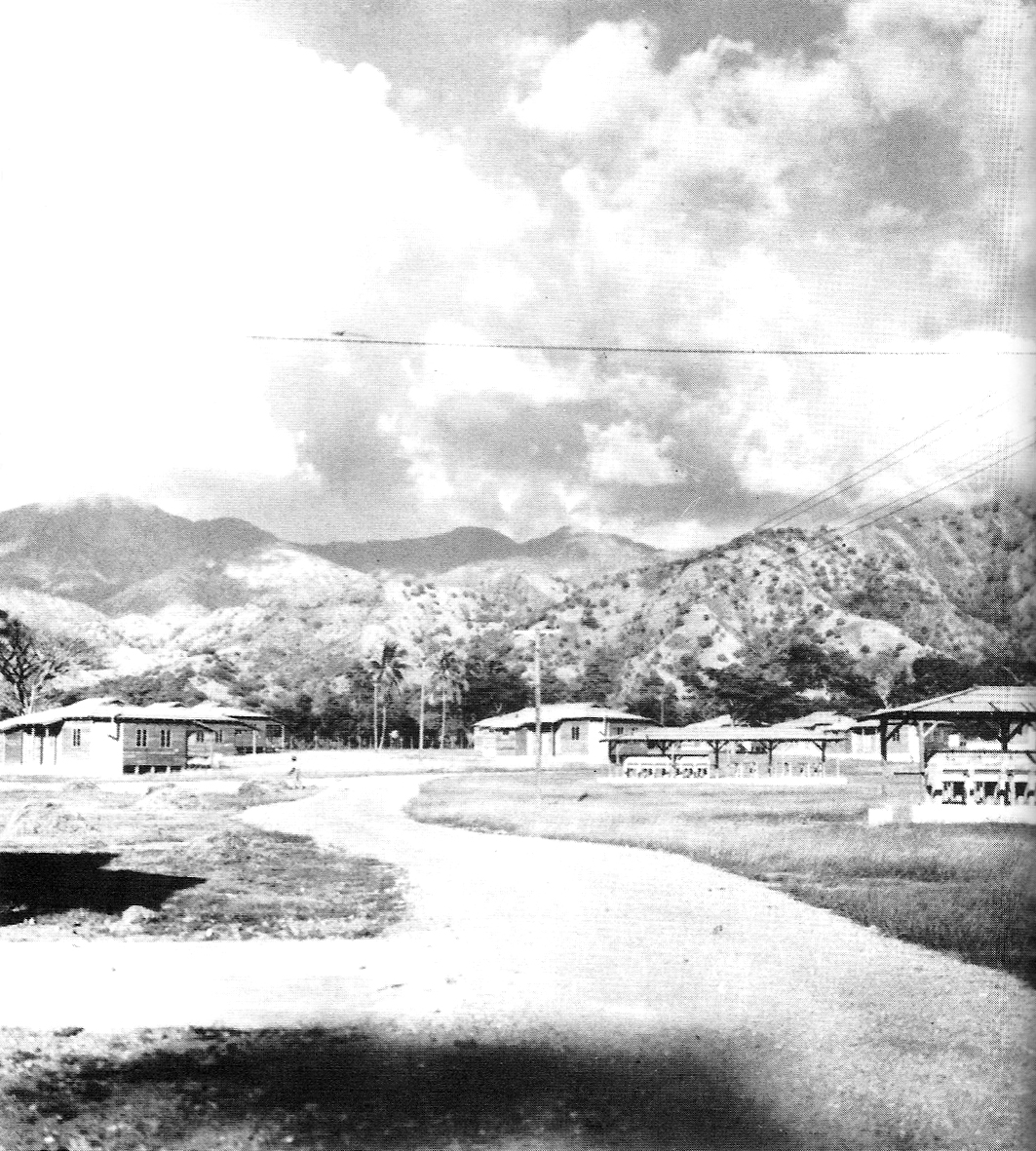
Gibraltar Evacuee Camp, where some of the evacuees from Gibraltar were housed during World War II

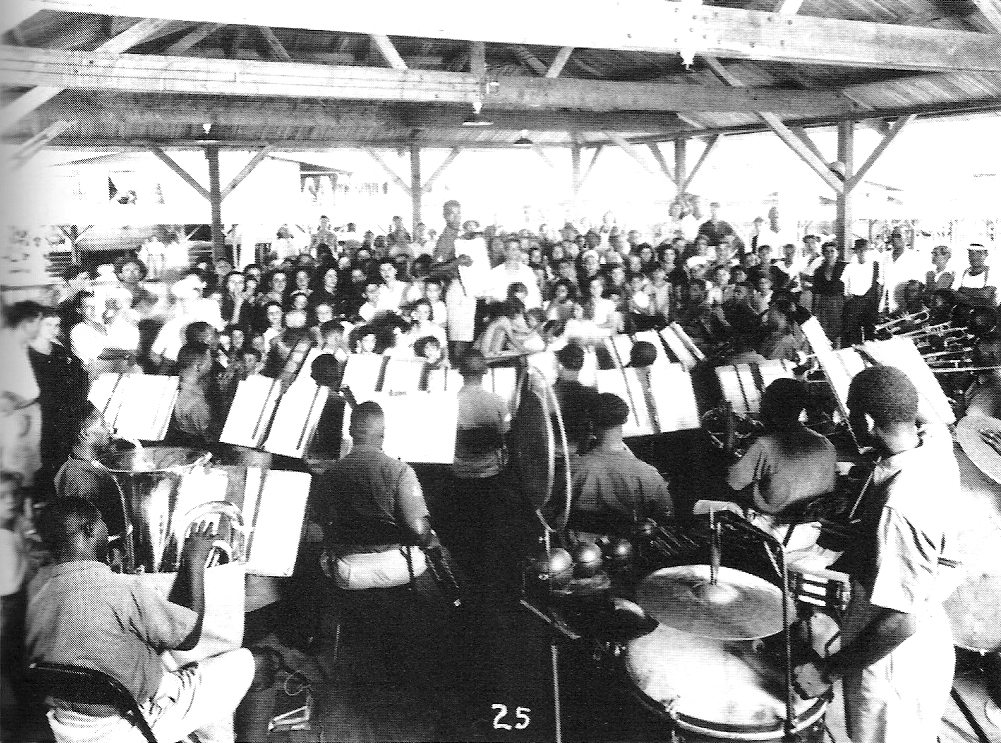
The Jamaica Military Band entertaining Gibraltarians at Gibraltar Camp during the evacuation of Gibraltarians during World War II.

During World War II, a refugee camp was established for Gibraltarian and Jewish refugees from Portugal and Spain. By 1942, approximately 1,500 evacuees from Gibraltar, a British territory, were in Jamaica; other civilians were evacuated to Britain and Madeira. They were removed to make way for a military force of 30,000 who fortified the area against German attack.

To speed up the development of the camp, barrack frames were built on the Jamaica-bound ship. The camp was situated on 252 acres of the former Mona Estate. It had housing for the evacuees, staff, and Roman Catholic priests and nuns. Facilities included a hospital, police station, and store. It was outfitted with electrical, water, and telephone service. There was a kosher kitchen and synagogue for Jewish refugees. People who had a trade could work within the camp.

The camp was designed to take 7,000, but the population of Malta had refused to be moved to Jamaica and the authorities wanted to use the unused capacity as a prisoner of war camp or as barracks for the local militia in 1943.

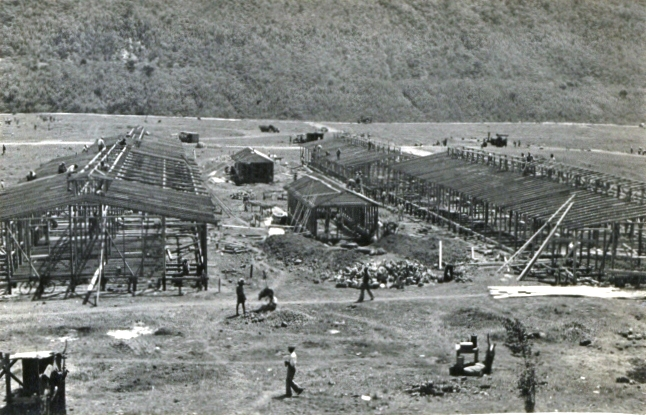
Construction of the buildings

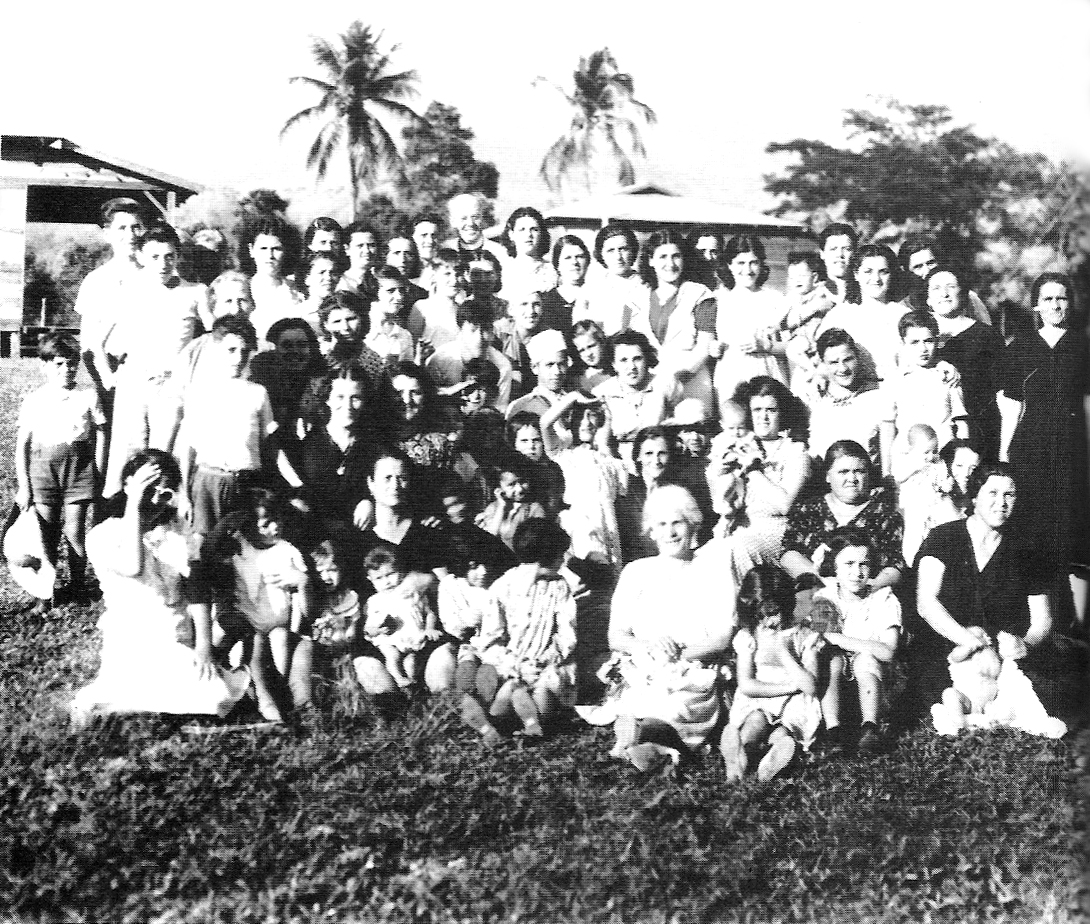
A group of Gibraltarians at the Gibraltar Evacuee Camp

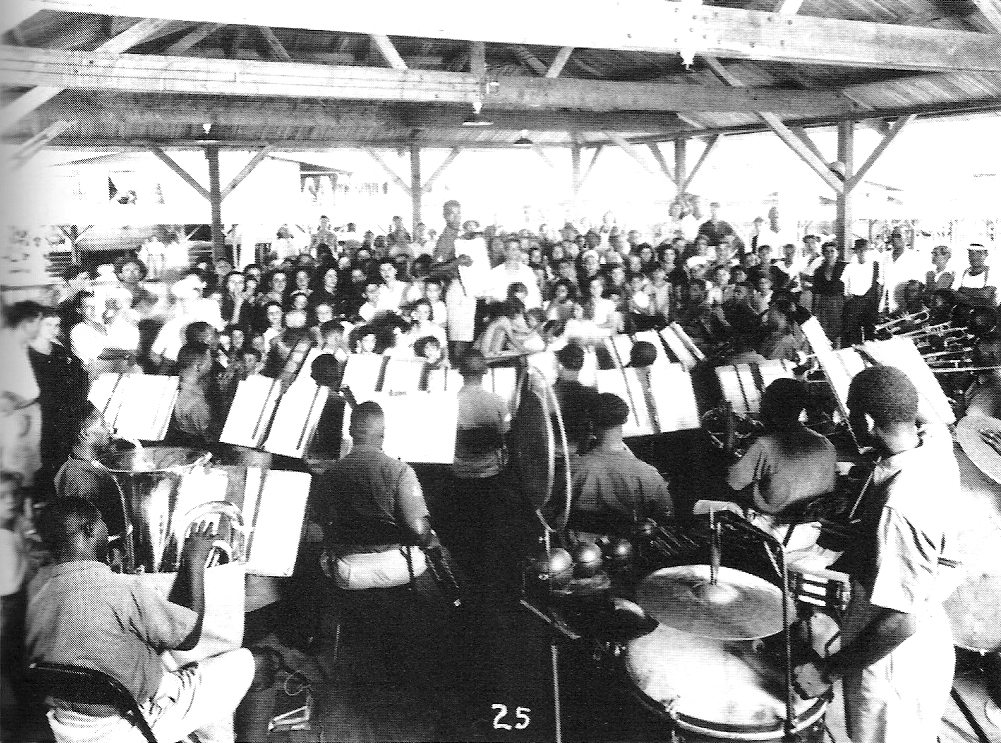
A military band entertains at the evacuee camp

== Educational and medical facilities ==
=== University of Technology ===
Formerly the College of Arts, Sciences and Technology (CAST), the University of Technology offers hospitality and architectural programmes. It has the largest sculpture garden in the Kingston area.

=== University of the West Indies ===
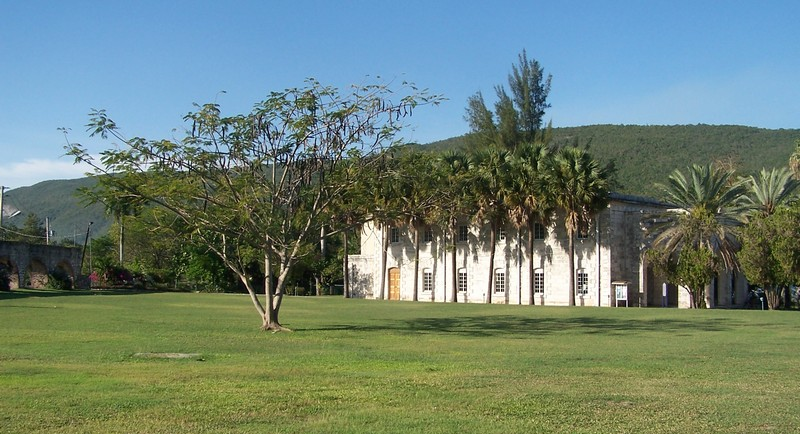
Chapel on the Mona campus of the University of the West Indies, on the left Aqueduct from the former sugar plantation

In 1948, the Mona campus was established as a college of the University of London. It is the first campus of the multi-campus University of the West Indies system. In October 1948, it accepted 33 medical students. In 1949 and 1950, Natural Science and the Arts were added to the curriculum, respectively. It now offers undergraduate, masters and doctoral courses in a wide range of subjects.

The University of the West Indies Mona campus is situated on the former site of the camp. Wooden buildings erected for the refugee camp were repurposed to become the original campus structures, which included lecture halls, laboratories, residence halls, and office buildings. These buildings were augmented with new construction that began in the early 1950s. Ruins from the Mona Estate, a sugar plantation, are present on the campus, including a water wheel, aqueducts, and mills. The chapel was built from stone blocks from an old, abandoned mansion in Trelawny.

=== University Hospital of the West Indies ===
The University Hospital of the West Indies was opened in 1953. In addition to offering patient care, the hospital also facilitates research and teaching along with the Medical Services department of the Mona campus of the University of the West Indies.
