= Jamaica Military Band =

Musical unit in the Jamaican Defence Forces

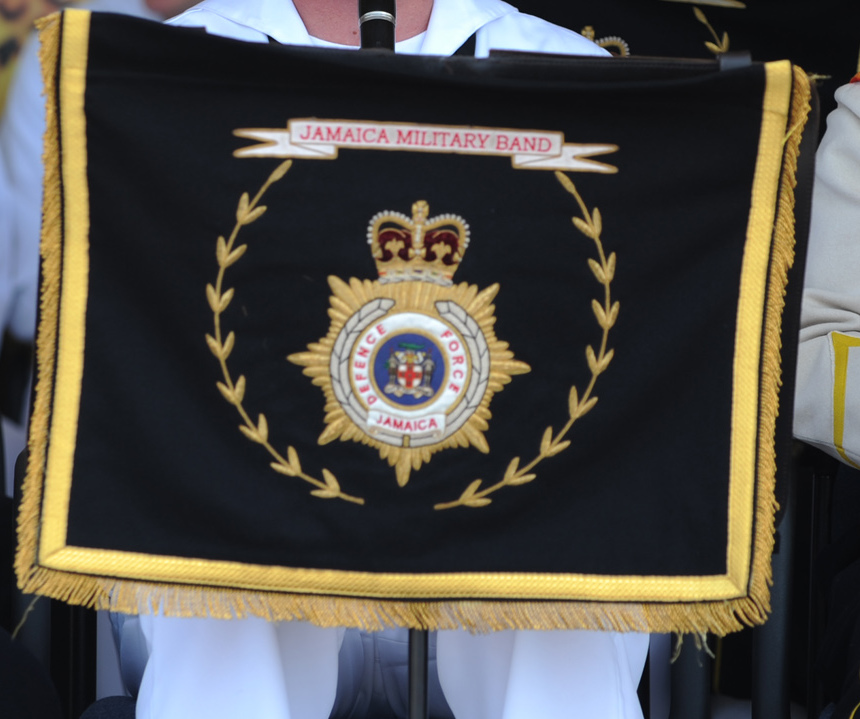
A music stand banner for the JMB.

Jamaican Military Band (JMB) is one of two military bands in the Jamaican Defence Forces, with the other being The Jamaica Regiment Band. The main task of the band is to play music at all national and military ceremonies. The band's repertoire includes mostly classical and marching music. During war time, the band takes on operational roles such as Medical Assistants.

The band participates the following activities:

- Concerts
- Military parades
- Dedication ceremonies
- National holidays
- Events of the state
- Funerals (state)

It is part of the Ceremonial and Investigation Division of the JDF. It consists of a parade band (which can be configured into a concert band) and a corps of drums, as well as soloists with specific duties. It is one of only three musical units in the world (the others being the nouba of the Tirailleurs of the modern French Army and the Band of the Barbados Regiment) that still wear the traditional uniform of the zouaves. The band celebrates its anniversary every 26 February. It plays a central role in the Independence Day celebrations at National Arena. It has performed through many media outlets, including at one point Jamaica's only radio station, ZQI (now Real Jamaican Radio). Musicians are drawn from all music establishments in the country, including the National Youth Orchestra.

== History ==
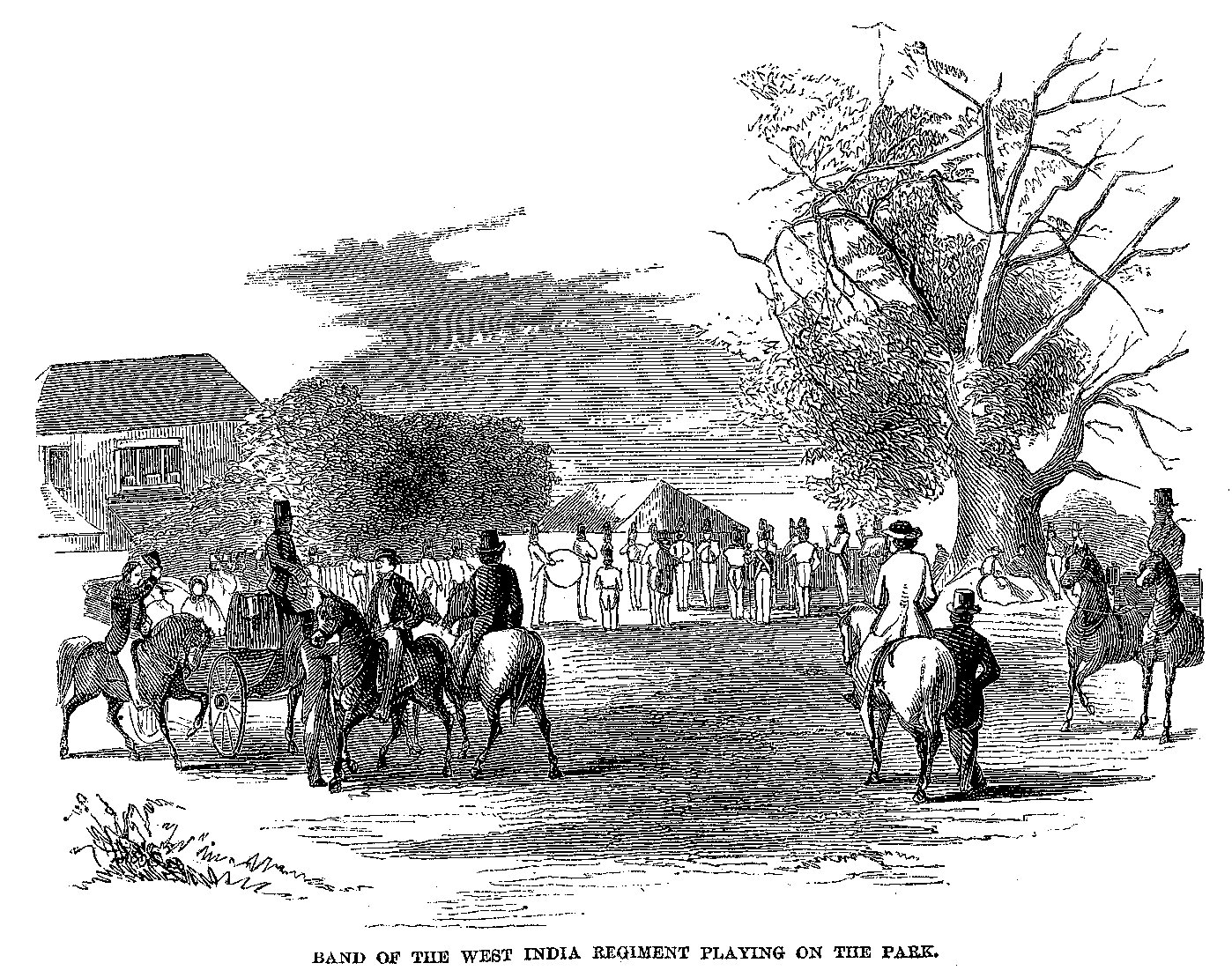
The Band of the West India Regiment playing in January 1861

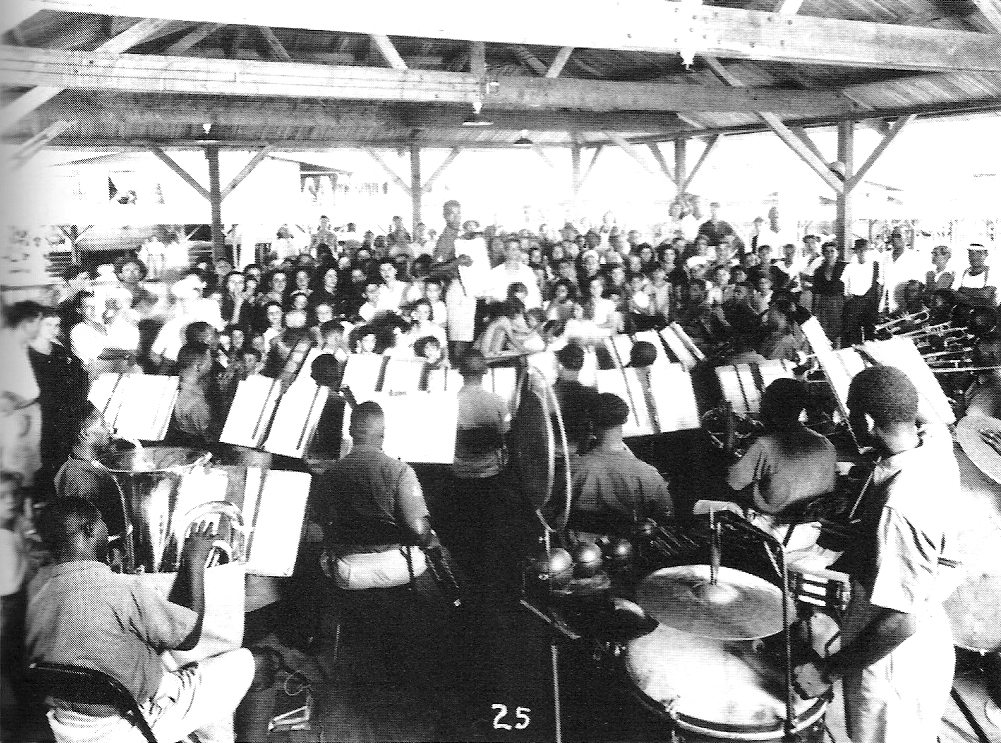
The Jamaica Military Band entertained Gibraltarians at Gibraltar Camp during the evacuation during World War II.

The band is a descendant of the Band of the West India Regiment, and was formed on 26 February 1927. This makes it the oldest continuously serving unit in the JDF. The regimental band was 131 years old when it was disbanded the previous year. Its final performance in that form was at Trafalgar Park House near Liguanea, the then official residence of the Commander of the British Army in Jamaica (now the residence of the British High Commissioner) in the presence of Prince Albert the Duke of York and the Duchess of York. On 8 December 1926, the then-Mayor of Kingston Hubert Simpson brought forward in the Legislative Council a motion for the retention of the Band. This was passed and on 26 February 1927, officially forming a fully domestic military band in the country. While the country was still part of the British Empire, the band played during the visit of British Prime Minister Winston Churchill and Premier Joey Smallwood from Newfoundland. Just weeks before the country gained Independence in 1962, the JMB was the first to publicly perform Jamaica, Land We Love, with the performance taking place at the Lyndhurst Methodist Church Hall. When the country did achieve its independence from the West Indies Federation, the band became disassociated with the shared military band of the WIF and became a separate entity.

Throughout the 1970s and 1980s, the JMB began its traditions and activities that it still holds on to today. The band's golden jubilee was celebrated in 1977 with honours being given by the Kingston and Saint Andrew Corporation and the Freedom of the City being given by the City of Kingston. That same year, it visited the United Kingdom, taking part in Silver Jubilee of Elizabeth II. In 1985, the horn from the band performed in the Bob, Peter, Bunny & Rita album by Bob Marley & the Wailers. In early July 2015, the JMB took part in a two-day information-sharing program with the 257th Army Band of the District of Columbia Army National Guard.

== Notable members ==
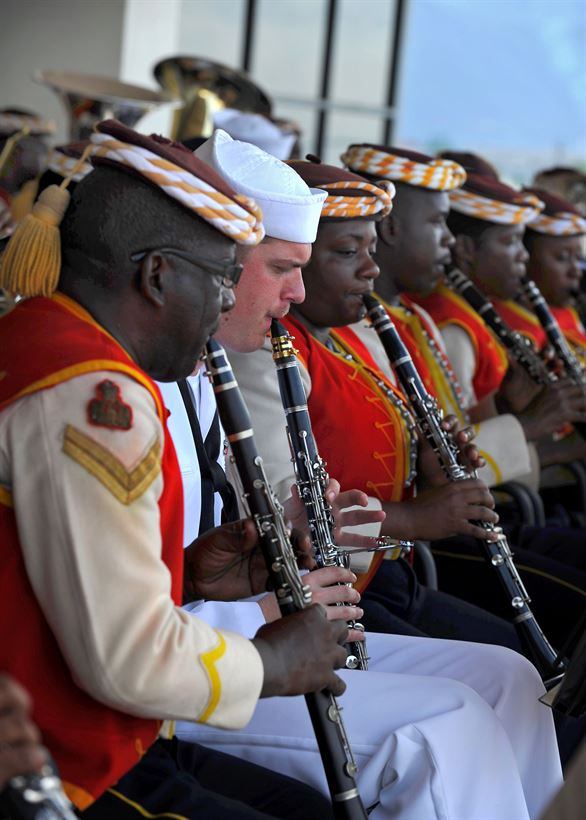
The United States Navy Fleet Forces Band performing with members of the Jamaican Military Band

- Band-Sergeant Arthur Sullivan Nibbs, he was honoured in the 1955 Birthday Honours
- Corporal Herbert George Nelson, he was honoured in the 1965 New Year Honours
- Warrant Officer Cecil Leonard Warren, he was honoured in the 1968 Birthday Honours
- Major Robert George Jones, ARCM LRCM, Director of Music
- Band Sergeant-Major Eldon Leigh Stewart
- Major Joe Williams, served as the band’s director of music from 1974 to 1995. He was also one of the founders of the Jamaica Copyright Licensing Agency.
- Lester Sterling, a Jamaican trumpet and saxophone player. He was a member of the JMB in the 1950s.
- David Madden, a solo trumpeter known as a member of Zap Pow, as well as playing on records of Bob Marley and other reggae artists.
- Johnny Moore, and founding member of pioneering Jamaican ska and reggae act The Skatalites. He was dismissed from the band and the army as a whole after three years due to being "not amenable to military service" due to his insistence on keeping his dreadlocks.

== Original compositions by band members ==
- The Jamaican Defence Force
- Independence Day
- Support and Services Battalion March
- Sky Waggons
- The Men of Steel
- Gloria (arranged by Staff Sergeant Gregory Nicholson)

== See also ==
- Cuban Revolutionary Armed Forces Military Bands Department
- Royal Bahamas Police Force Band
- Fiji Military Forces Band
- Jamaica Constabulary Force Band
