= Independence Day (Jamaica) =

National holiday in Jamaica

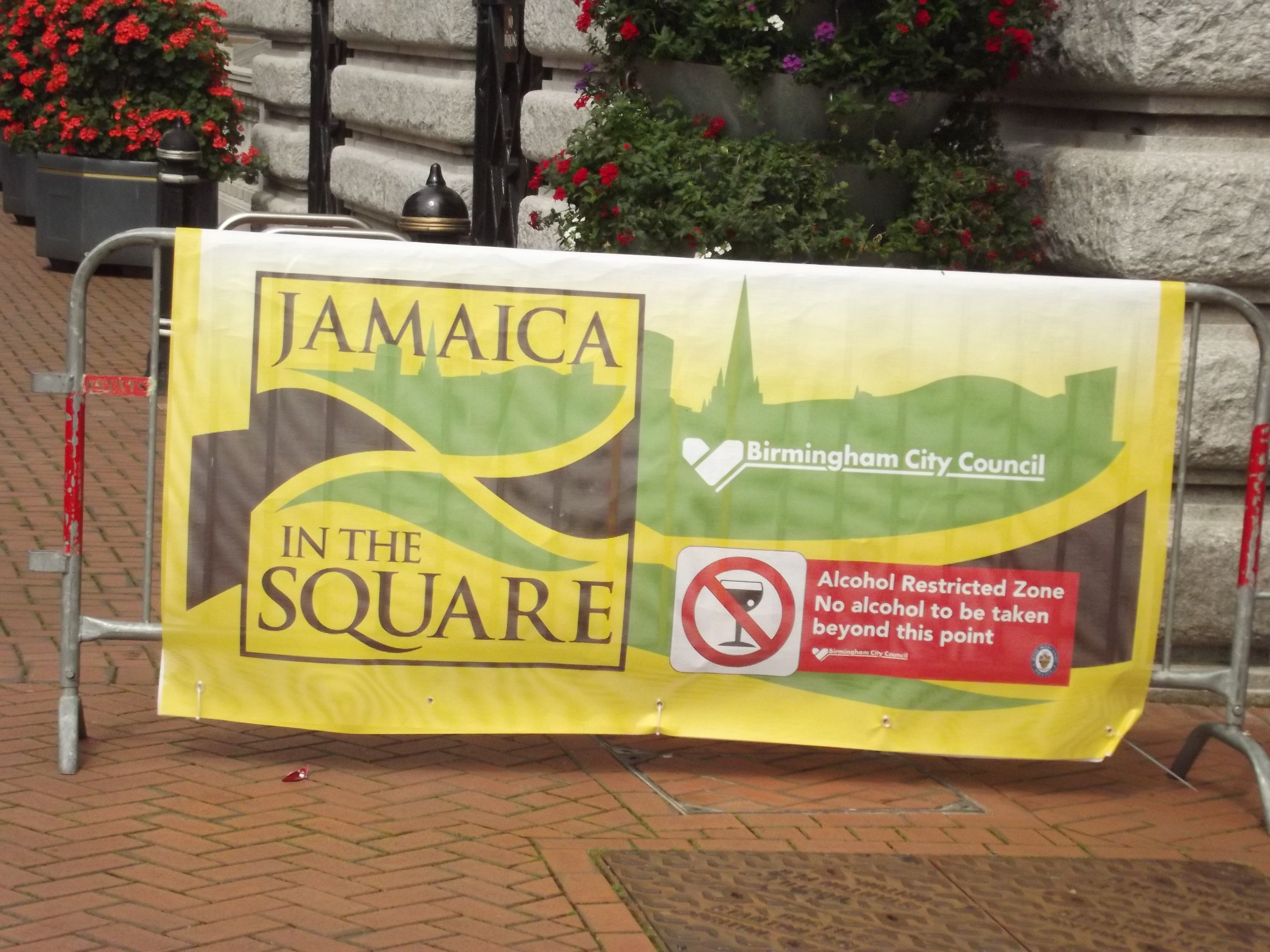
- A sign for a Jamaica in the Square event in honor of Jamaican Independence Day on Chamberlain Square, Birmingham.
- Observed by: Jamaica
- Type: State
- Celebrations: Fireworks, Concerts, Parades
- Date: 6 August 1962

Independence Day is the national day of Jamaica, celebrated in annually on 6 August, the anniversary of the coming into force of the Jamaica Independence Act 1962. It is one of the most senior public holidays in Jamaica.

== Background ==
The Colony of Jamaica gained its independence from the United Kingdom on 6 August 1962, following more than 300 years under British control. Black nationalism was particularly fostered in Jamaica in the first half of the 20th century, the most notable Black leader in the country being Marcus Garvey, a labor leader and an advocate of the Back-to-Africa movement, which called for everyone of African descent to return to the homelands of their ancestors. Nationalist sentiment climaxed during the British West Indian labour unrest of 1934–39, during which protests occurred between Black and British residents of the British West Indies. Following the end of World War II, the decolonisation movement began, with local politicians in Jamaica and in the British Empire transitioning their crown colonies into independent states. After Norman Manley was elected to the post of Chief Minister in 1955, the process of decolonisation was made even quicker, especially with his constitutional amendments that he enacted that allowed for greater home rule and established the basis for a cabinet of ministers under a Prime Minister of Jamaica.

Jamaica also entered the West Indies Federation, a political union of 10 colonial Caribbean islands that were combined to become a single, independent state. Jamaica's role in the WIF was unpopular, which resulted in the popular opinion in the 1961 West Indies referendum of 1961 to rule that the colony will withdraw from the union the following year. On 19 July 1962, the Parliament of the United Kingdom passed the Jamaica Independence Act, granting independence effective on 6 August, establishing the role of the Governor General of Jamaica and enshrining the role of head of state in the Queen of Jamaica.

== Celebrations ==
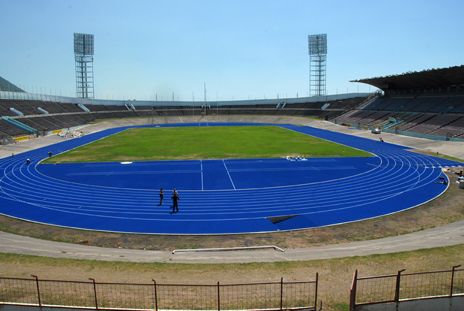
Independence Park (seen here in 2011) is the fulcrum of the Independence Day celebrations.

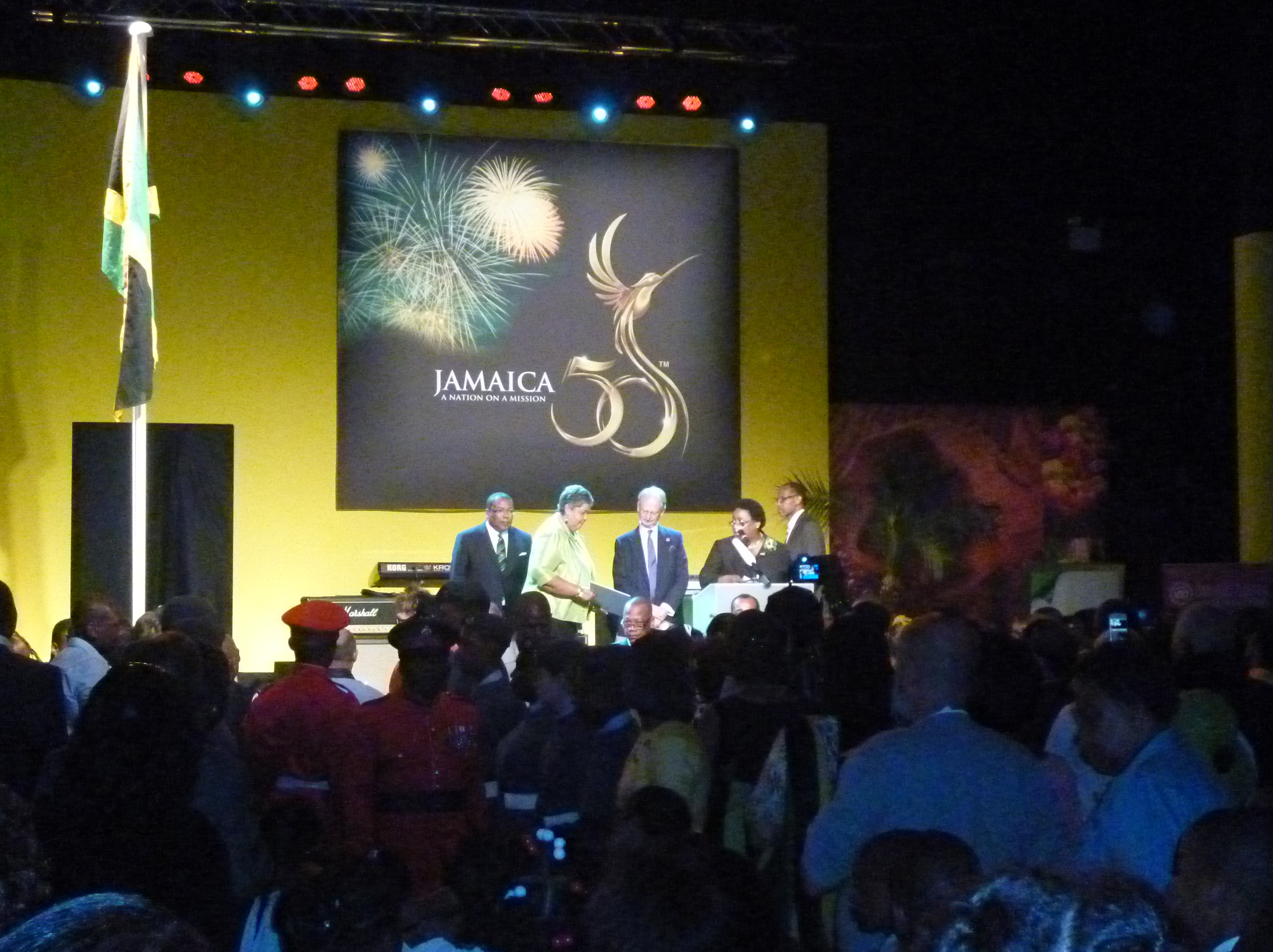
British Under-Secretary of State for Foreign Affairs Henry Bellingham at an event held in Jamaica House to mark the 50th anniversary of Jamaican Independence, 6 August 2012.

The main celebrations take place in the evening at the National Arena in Independence Park. On Independence Day, Jamaicans take part in huge street parades, don clothing coloured like the Jamaican flag, and put on all manner of cultural displays.

The overall event is termed "Jamaica Festival". The festival was initiated in 1962 by the then Community Development Minister (and future Prime Minister) Edward Seaga, to showcase literary and performing artists of the country. The festival includes agricultural exhibitions, parades, climaxing in a grand gala at the National Stadium. Supporting events also take place in Kingston and all over the island. A formal organizing group, known as the Jamaica Festival Commission was established by the Jamaican Parliament in 1968 to oversee the holiday activities. One of the highlights of the festival is the Popular Song Competition (known as the Independence Festival Song Competition before 1990), which first took place in 1966, and has included artists such as The Maytals, Freddie McKay, and Eric Donaldson.

The following uniformed marching bands take part in the ceremonies:

- Jamaica Military Band
- The Jamaica Regiment Band
- Corps of Drums of the 1st Battalion, The Jamaica Regiment
- Corps of Drums of the 3rd Battalion, The Jamaica Regiment
- Jamaica Constabulary Force Band
- Jamaica Combined Cadet Force Band

== Timeline ==
- On the day it gained its independence, the Union Jack was ceremonially lowered and replaced by the new Jamaican flag, firstly in the capital and then around the nation. Princess Margaret the Countess of Snowdon, opened the first session of the Parliament of Jamaica on behalf of her sister the Queen.
- Emancipation Park was opened days before Independence Day and on the eve of Emancipation Day in 2002.
- In 2012, reggae singer Winston Reedy performed at the Respect Jamaica 50 series of concerts as part of a deejay special alongside other reggae vocalists U Roy, Yellowman and Tappa Zukie.
- A 50th anniversary military tattoo, dubbed the Jamaica Military Tattoo 2012, was held between 28 June to 1 July at the JDF Polo Field at Up Park Camp. The tattoo saw members of the Jamaica Military Band, the Jamaica Constabulary Force Band and the Jamaica Fire Brigade Band take part.
- In 2019, Kenyan President Uhuru Kenyatta attended the 57th Independence anniversary celebrations as part of a three-day state visit to Jamaica as a guest of Prime Minister Andrew Holness.

== Relations with Emancipation Day ==
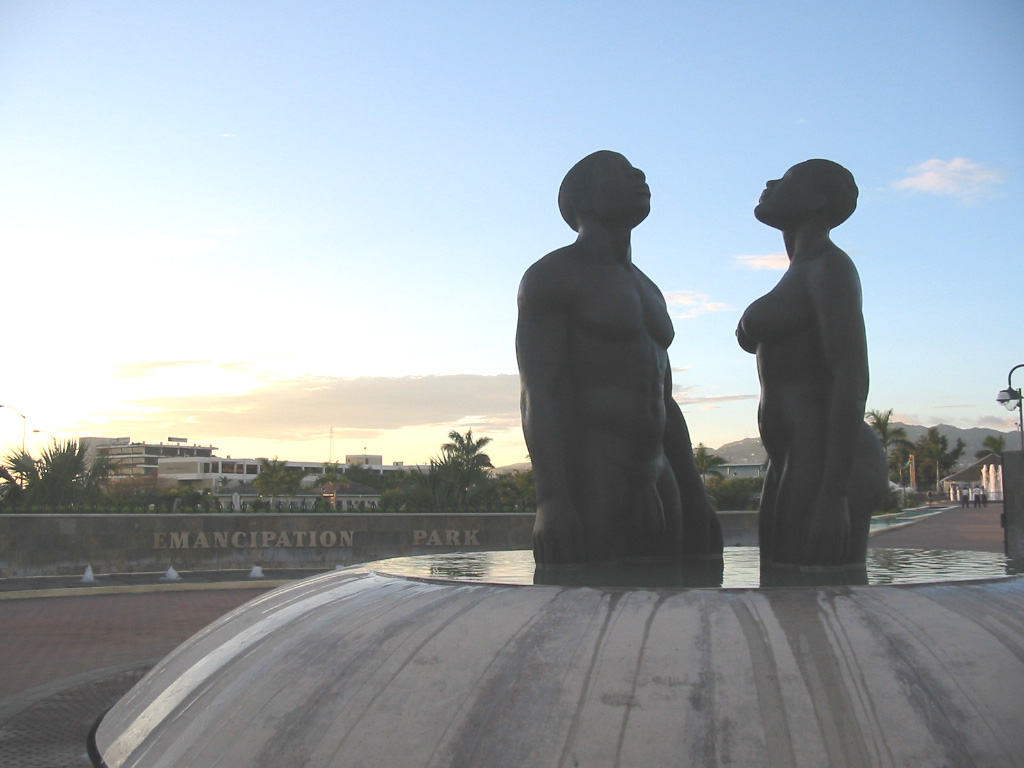
Emancipation Park, Kingston, Jamaica 2004

Emancipation Day is another public holiday that is part of a week-long cultural celebration starting on 1 August and ending on Independence Day. It commemorates the Emancipation of the British West Indies in the 1830s and the Slavery Abolition Act 1833. Having been a national holiday under British control, Emancipation Day had stopped being observed as a national holiday in 1962 after independence. It was reinstated as a national public holiday in 1998 after a six-year campaign led by Jamaican scholar and educational leader Rex Nettleford.

Traditionally, people hold vigils on July 31 and at midnight ring church bell and play drums in parks and public squares to re-enact the first moments of freedom for enslaved Africans. There is also a reenactment of the reading of the Emancipation Declaration in town centres such as Spanish Town, which was the home to the government when the Emancipation Act was passed.
