= Erla Harewood-Christopher =

Trinidad and Tobago police officer

Commissioner of the Trinidad and Tobago Police Service
- In office February 3, 2023 – January 31, 2025

Personal details
- Born: May 14, 1963 (age 63)
- Education: University of the West Indies; University of Cambridge

Erla Harewood-Christopher (born May 14, 1963) is a Trinidadian and Tobagonian police officer.

== Early life ==
Erla Harewood-Christopher was born on May 14, 1963. Erla Harewood-Christopher graduated from the University of the West Indies with a BSc in public sector management before earning a master's degree in applied criminology and police management from the University of Cambridge.

== Career ==
Harewood-Christopher began her policing career in Central Division, where she served from 1982 to 1991. She became Deputy Commissioner of Police in 2017, initially overseeing administration before moving to operations in 2021.

=== Police commissioner ===
Harewood-Christopher was appointed Trinidad and Tobago's first female police commissioner on February 3, 2023. Her appointment was approved by a unanimously in the House of Representatives.

She was removed on January 31, 2025.
