= Trinidad and Tobago Defence Force Steel Orchestra =

Trinidad and Tobago military band

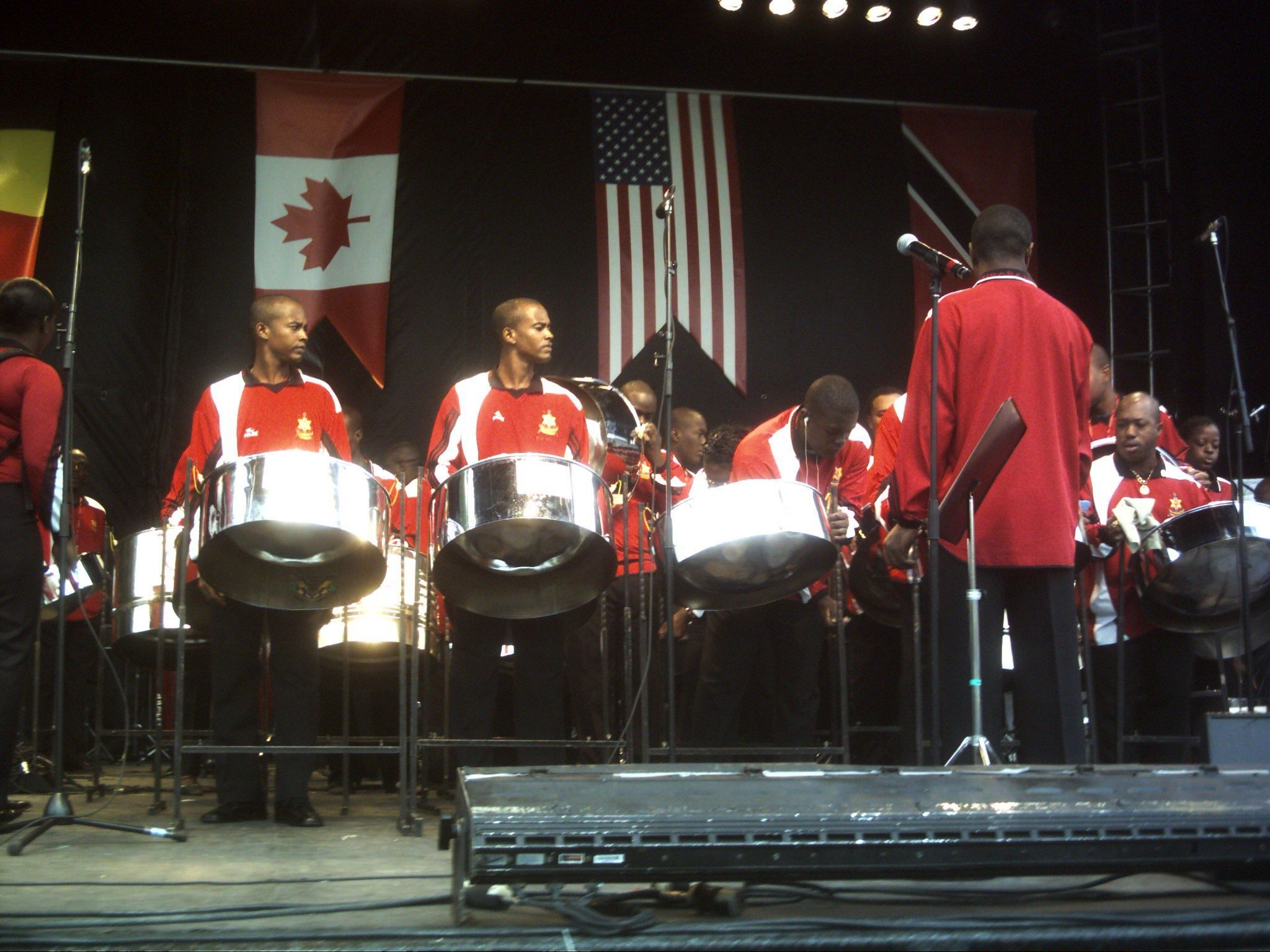
Steelpans are a type of instrument used by the Trinidad and Tobago Defence Force Steel Orchestra.

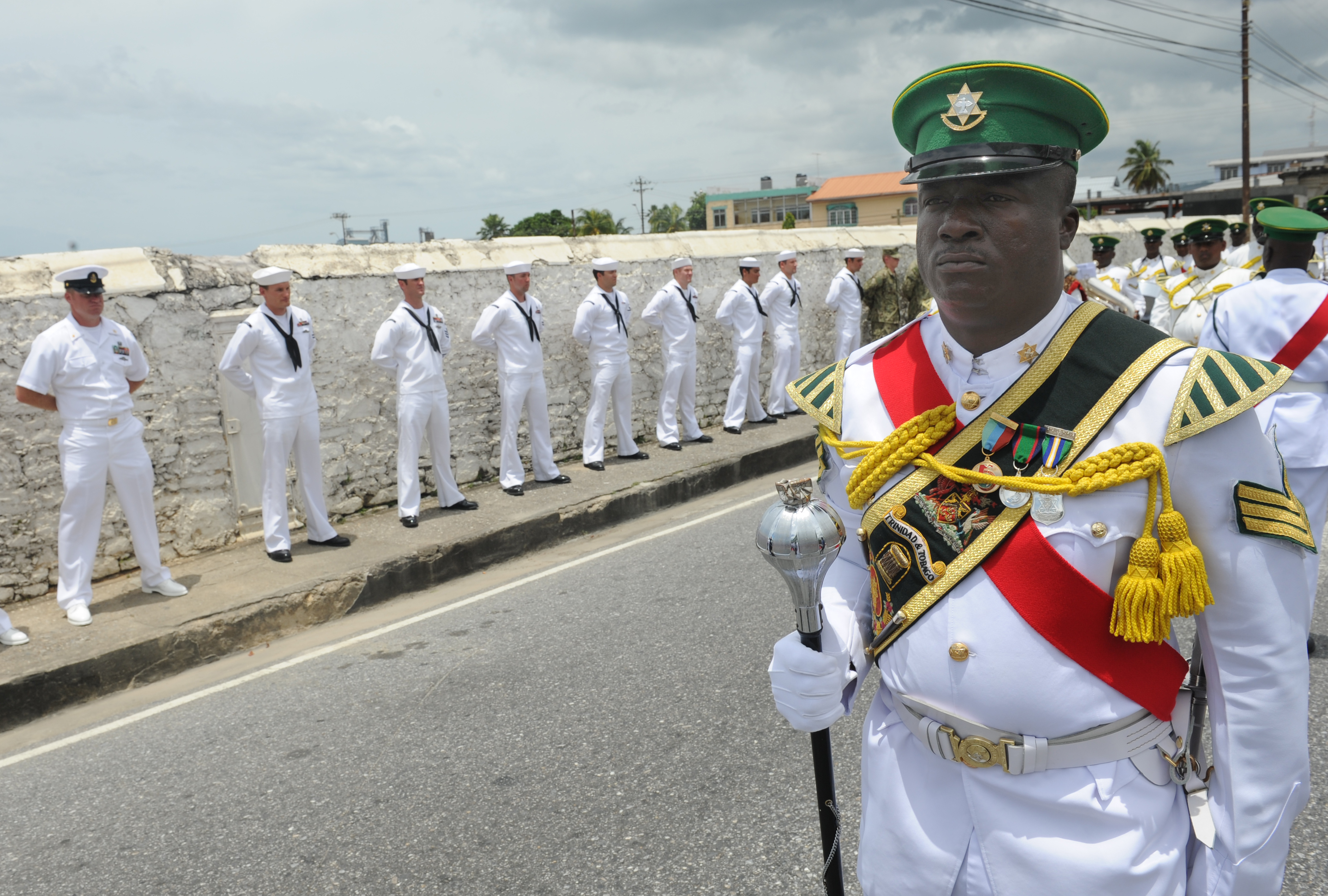
The drum major of the TTDFSO in full dress uniform.

The Trinidad and Tobago Defence Force Steel Orchestra (TTDFSO) is a specialized military band that is part of the Trinidad and Tobago Defence Force. It has its roots in British traditions for military bands, all while also uniquely using unconventional instruments such as steelpans and other native Trinidadian instruments. The 40-member band is currently the only military steel band in the world.

The Trinidad and Tobago Regiment provides the majority of the musicians who are assigned to the orchestra. Following a brief attempt create a similar type of marching band the 1960s, the TTDFSO was created on 2 June 1995 on the initiative of Chief of Defence Staff Carlton A. Alfonso and Sergeant Cecil James. The regiment had its own brass band at one point, which followed French and African music styles. Today the band follows Afro-Caribbean music Calypso music rhythms in its repertoire.

== Competitions ==
- 1996 – The orchestra entered the Pan Is Beautiful Music Festival as a conventional band and won the prize for the best calypso and placing third overall.
- 1997 – Entered the National Panorama Competition for traditional Steel Orchestras, placing first for its performance of Mirror Mirror.
- 1996-1999 – The band participated in the St. Peter's Day competition in the traditional band category where a gospel song was required to be arranged.
- 2004 – The orchestra placed 3rd at the Trinidad and Tobago National Panorama Competition
- 2005 – The band performed at the World Steel Band Music Festival which was held in Madison Square Garden, New York, coming in 3rd place.
- 2013 – Participated at the Siparia Fest Steel Band competition performing in three categories; Calypso, Gospel and Pan on the Move. The TTDFSO placed 2nd in the first category while placing 3rd in the latter two

== Timeline ==
=== Solo performances ===
- In the mid-90s the orchestra was invited by the French Army's 33rd Regiment in the Antilles to perform during the anniversary celebrations for Martinique. It was the first in what became an annual event for the TTDFSO, having returned to Martinique in 1998, 1999 and 2000.
- In June 2006, the orchestra formed part of a national contingent that performed at the World Cup 2006 in Germany. The members of the band played in Nuremberg, Kaiserslautern and Dortmund.
- In October of that same year, the orchestra performed at the 25th anniversary of Independence of Antigua and Barbuda.
- The band became the first steel orchestra to lead an armed contingent of troops on a ceremonial parade, when on its return from Scotland in 1997 it made its first appearance at the annual Independence Day Parade.
- In April 2006, the orchestra played in Washington, D.C. at the request of the Delaware National Guard. In appreciation of the Band's performances, the members were awarded the status of honorary citizens of the City of Baltimore.

=== Joint-performances ===
- In November 1999, the TTDFSO was invited to perform at the ANZAC Military Tattoo in Sydney, Australia
- It also took part in the Royal Nova Scotia International Tattoo in Halifax followed by the Basel Tattoo in Switzerland.
- In May 2009, the orchestra performed at the Windsor Castle Royal Tattoo in the presence of Queen Elizabeth II.
- In August 2009, it performed at the Quebec City International Festival of Military Bands.
- In May 2010, the band took part in the Netherlands Military Tattoo and the Luxembourg International Tattoo.
- On 26 August 2012, the band performed with bands such as the Central Military Band of the People's Liberation Army of China, the Band of the Royal Marines Plymouth and the Prison Service Band in a military tattoo celebrating the golden jubilee of Trinidad and Tobago.
- In the summer of 2023, the band took part in the Royal Edinburgh Military Tattoo. This followed its last performances at the tattoo in 1997, 2005, 2007, 2010, 2014, and 2019, with the latter edition seeing the band being awarded with Pooley Broadsword, which is annually awarded to the best performing contingent at the tattoo.
- That same year, the TTDFSO took part in the Virginia International Tattoo.

== See also ==
- Jamaica Military Band
- Barbados Defence Force Band
- Royal Bahamas Police Force Band
- Fiji Military Forces Band
- United States Navy Steel Band
