= Jamaica Constabulary Force Band =

- Origin: Kingston Gardens, Jamaica
- Years active: Since 1958
- Members: 50

The Jamaica Constabulary Force Band (JCF Band) is a 50-member specialized department and police band based in Kingston Gardens, Jamaica. It consists of constables who specialize in music and the arts. Members conduct the musical duties as well as fulfill the responsibilities of a commissioned police officer.

It was founded on 6 May 1958 by orders of Commissioner Reginald T. Michelin with 15 police constables in its ranks led by Superintendent C. T. Beare from England. That same day, it made its first performance at Fort Charles. Over the years, many band members have been sent to Kneller Hall for musical training. Jamaican-American singer Sadiki is the son of Henry Buckley Sr., who was a singer/songwriter and Music Director for the JCF Band. Otger directors of the band have included George Wooten, Cecil Warren, and George Moodie.

In the years since its founding, the JCF Band has become very popular in the Caribbean region and in the country itself. It performs on holidays such as Independence Day and performs at events such as the graduation of newly sworn in constables from the Jamaica Police Academy. A changing of the guard ceremony at the police headquarters is held by with the musical support of the JCF Band. It has also played in honor of the United Nations Sustainable Development Goals program, the West Indian Independence Parade, as well as marching behind to coffin of former Jamaican Prime Minister Edward Seaga during his funeral procession in June 2019.

Music bands are also sported by the Jamaica Fire Brigade, the Department of Correctional Services and the Jamaica Defence Force.

== See also ==
- Jamaica Military Band
- Barbados Police Band
- Fanfare du Palais National
