= Royal Bahamas Police Force Band =

Official Royal Bahamian police force band

The Royal Bahamas Police Force Band is the official police band of Royal Bahamas Police Force (RBPF). Also referred to as the RBPF Band, it is the main musical support unit in the one of Bahamas. On special occasions, the RBPF Band can be seen at many state events and performances, such as the Changing of the Guard at the Government House and the Beating Retreat on Bay Street. It has also taken part in many historical events since the country's independence from the United Kingdom in 1973. Events of this nature include leading the funeral procession in honor of former Prime Minister Lynden Pindling in 2000, and the 75th anniversary of the RBPF in 2015. It has also been depicted on the reverse side of the $1 banknote of the Bahamian dollar. Their full uniform is composed of white tunics, navy trousers, and a white, spiked, Pith helmet. The RBPF Band was founded in 1893 with at least 12 NCO's and by the early 1960s, had performed in every major country in the world. It is currently located at the Royal Bahamas Police Force Headquarters on East Street in the capital of Nassau.

In March 2021, Corporal 3727 Ryan Cartwright became the newest appointed principal Drum Major of the Royal Bahamas Police Force Band by Commissioner of Police Paul Rolle. Corporal Cartwright would take over from Inspector Tabori Dean who would have held the title of Drum Major for over a decade.
