= Fiji Military Forces Band =

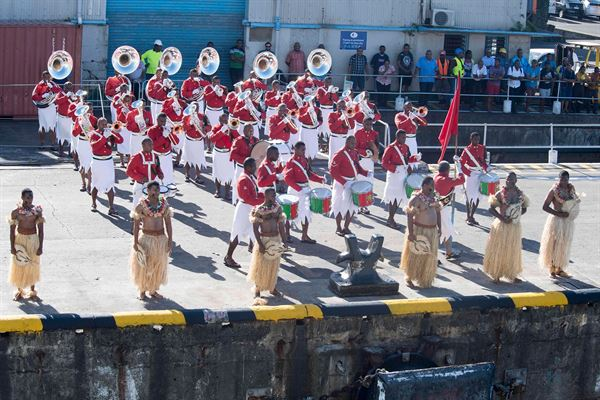

Background information
- Origin: Suva, Fiji
- Genres: Marching Music
- Years active: 1917; 109 years ago

The Republic of Fiji Military Forces Band also commonly known as the RFMF Band is a 50 member brass band from the Republic of Fiji Military Forces. It was formerly known as the Royal Fiji Military Forces Band under the Dominion of Fiji.

== History ==
The RFMF Band has been widely known as musical ambassadors for Fiji. The band was established during World War I as the Suva Town Band. It originally started as fife and drum band but changed to a brass band in 1917. It was disbanded following the outbreak of World War II. It was reformed in 1941 as the band of the 1st Battalion Fiji Infantry Regiment band, of which members were in active service in the Solomon Islands. When they perform, their uniform includes wearing the traditional Fijian Sulu. Occasionally they are accompanied by meke dancers.

Between 1968 and 2017, the band was engaged in many performances around the world including the Royal Edinburgh Military Tattoo. In September 1965, the band took part in the Royal Marines Tattoo at Madison Square Garden, five years before the colony of Fiji gained independence from the United Kingdom. In 1970, the band received their Royal title from the Queen of Fiji, Queen Elizabeth II when the Royal Fiji Military Forces and the Royal Fiji Police Force were given theirs.

In 2016, the band was invited to perform during the Queens 90th birthday celebrations at Windsor Castle. On its 100th anniversary in 2017, a gallery was set up to where people can look at the history of the RFMF band. A ceremonial military tattoo was also held in the presence of President of Fiji Jioji Konrote at the Queen Elizabeth Barracks.

== See also ==
- Central Military Band of the People's Liberation Army of China
- Indian military bands
- New Zealand Army Band
