= Fanfare du Palais National =

Police band of the Republic of Haiti

The Fanfare du Palais National d'Haiti (Fanfare of the National Palace), also known as the Presidential Guard Orchestra (French: L'Orchestre de la Garde présidentielle) is a police band unit of the Republic of Haiti. The band uses French and American military traditions in its activities, as well as sports many styles native to Haiti and the Caribbean region. It is part of the Security Unit and Presidential Guard (L'Unité de Sécurité et de Garde Présidentielle) in the Haitian National Police. It also provides musical accompaniment to the Armed Forces of Haiti. In both roles as a police band and a military band, it performs the national anthem La Dessalinienne on special occasions. The band in its current form was founded in 1972 by Colonel Ipharès Blain, who directed the band from 1960 to 1991. Occide Jeanty, who was one of Haiti's most revered military composers and the author of many revolutionary era marches was a member of one of the bands in its lineage. A street in Port-au-Prince was later named for him and a stamp was issued on his centennial in 1960.

On its 45th anniversary in 2017, the band was given a reception at the National Palace by President Jovenel Moise, during which Blain received awards from the National School of the Arts (ENARTS) and the National Theater of Haiti as well as a decoration of an Officer of the National Order of Honour and Merit. Blain died in August 2018 at the age of 96.

== See also ==
- Cuban Revolutionary Armed Forces Military Bands Department
- Jamaica Military Band
- French Republican Guard Band
