= Barbados Police Service =

The Barbados Police Service
- Abbreviation: TBPS
- Motto: To serve, protect and reassure

Agency overview
- Formed: 1835

Jurisdictional structure
- Operations jurisdiction: Barbados, West Indies
- Governing body: Attorney General and Ministry of Legal Affairs (Barbados)
- General nature: Civilian police

Operational structure
- Headquarters: Barbados Police Headquarters; Roebuck Street, Bridgetown, St. Michael, Barbados
- Elected officer responsible: Dale Marshall, Attorney General and Ministry of Legal Affairs
- Agency executive: Mrs. Sonia Boyce, Commissioner of Police

Website
- https://tbps.gov.bb

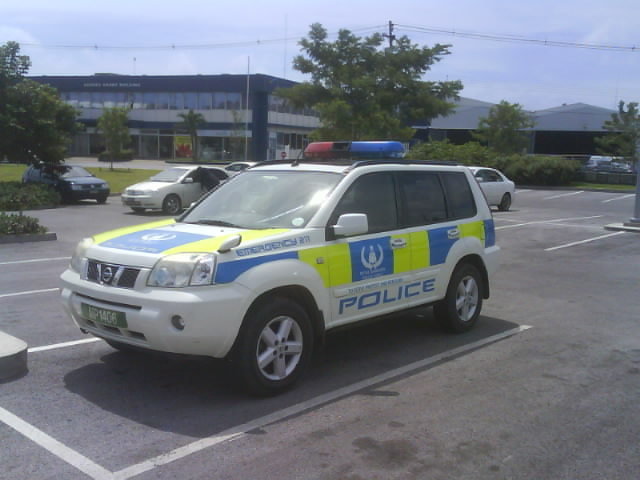
Barbados Police Patrol Car

The Barbados Police Service (TBPS), previously called the Royal Barbados Police Force (RBPF), is the law enforcement agency in Barbados, as established under the Police Act, Cap. 167. Sonia Boyce is the current Commissioner of the Police since July 2026 and is the first female commissioner in the agency's history.

TBPS is divided into five operational divisions: the Northern Division, Southern Division, Bridgetown Division, Criminal Investigations Division and Operations Support Division. These are supported by the Administrative Services Division The organisational structure of the TBPS is modelled after London's Metropolitan Police Service.

In recent years, a growing number of Barbadian police officers have been recruited to take up jobs in the Bermuda Police Service.

== History ==
The main Police Force of Barbados was established in 1835. Soon after its founding the Police Force informally had mounted policemen, however in 1880 an actual mounted division was recognised and known as the Mounted Corps. (later renamed the Mounted Branch in 1933.) In 1882, the Harbour Police Force was unified with the main land division after it had been established separately in 1867. Roughly 100 years later in the 1980s the Harbour Police unit was dissolved entirely.

The prefix "Royal" was added to the title of the Police Force in February 1966 during a visit to Barbados by Queen Elizabeth II, which was retained until November 2021, becoming part of the name and identity of the force in the interim.

In 1981, the Royal Barbados Police Force became a full member of the International Criminal Police Organization (Interpol).

In 2021, the name The Barbados Police Service was selected to be the new name for the Royal Barbados Police Force and replaced the old name when Barbados became a republic on November 30, 2021. The name was selected to reflect the removal of the Queen as head of state and as stated by the Minister of Legal Affairs Dale Marshall, "...the police force as it is now and as we want it to be in the future, has to be more than the notion of brute strength, a force pushing against people and pushing against objects because policing has long ago stopped being centered on brawn and force".

== Organisation ==
The headquarters for TBPS is in the former Barclays Bank Complex on Lower Roebuck Street, Bridgetown, Saint Michael.

The headquarters houses the Commissioner of Police; the Deputy Commissioner of Police; the offices of all assistant commissioners of police; all staff officers of the above commissioners; the secretary to the Commissioner of Police; the Research and Development Department; the Police Registry; and the Office of Compliance.

== Ranks ==
Royal Barbados Police Force ranks
Rank	Constable	Sergeant	Station Sergeant	Inspector	Assistant Superintendent	Superintendent	Senior Superintendent	Assistant Commissioner of Police	Deputy Commissioner of Police	Commissioner of Police
Epaulette Insignia (to 2021)										

These insignia were amended, removing St Edward's Crown and replacing it with the Coat of Arms of Barbados as country became a republic in the Commonwealth of Nations on 30 November 2021.

== Locations ==
District Police Stations:

- Saint Michael
  - District "A" station
  - Black Rock
  - Bridgetown Port
  - Court Prosecutors
  - Hastings (Saint Michael/Christ Church)
- Christ Church
  - Oistins
  - Worthing
- Saint George/Christ Church
  - District "B" station
- Saint Philip/Saint John
  - District "C" station
- Saint Thomas
  - District "D" station
- Saint Peter
  - District "E" station
- Saint Joseph
  - District "F" station
- Saint James
  - Holetown
- Saint Andrew
  - Belleplaine
- Saint Lucy
  - Crab Hill

Motto: To protect, serve and reassure.

== See also ==
- Barbados Defence Force (BDF)
- Barbados Police Band
- International Criminal Police Organization (Interpol)
- List of countries by size of police forces
