= National Band of the Carabineros =

Music branch of the Chilean Carabineros

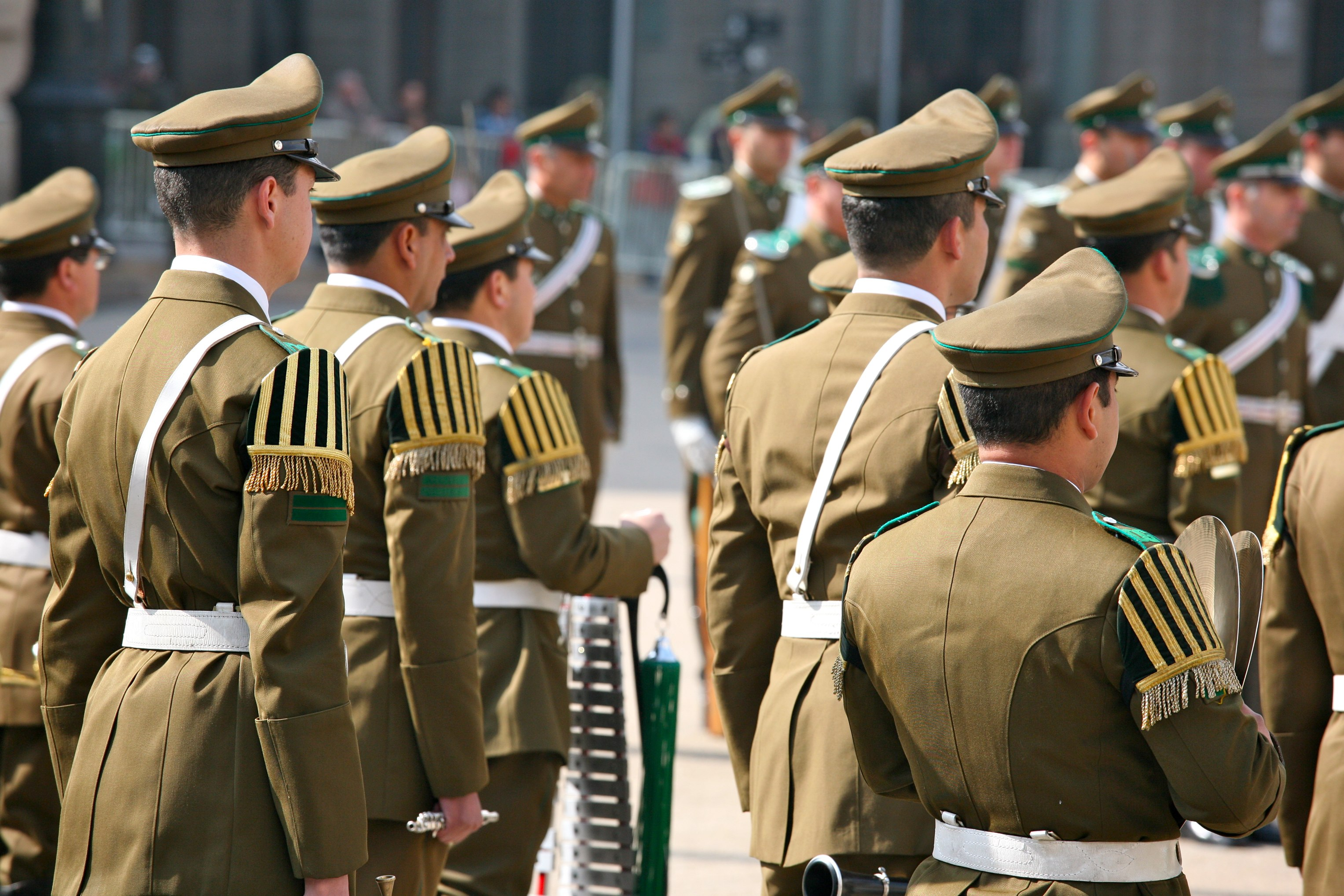
The band during a military parade.

The National Band of the Carabineros (Spanish: Banda Nacional de Carabineros de Chile) sometimes referred to as the Orfeón Nacional is the public police band of the Carabineros de Chile, the national police force of the Republic of Chile. It is generally seen as the premiere representative marching band of the force, performing at state occasions. At the command of the band is Colonel David Ormeño Sepúlveda.

== Unit structure ==
It consists of between 110-200 Carabineros divided into the following instrumental bands:

- Ceremonial Band
- Chamber Ensemble
  - Clarinet Sextet
  - Concert Band
  - Bronze Quintet
  - Big Band

The band has been integrated with women musicians since 2013.

== History ==
On 30 July 1853, the Commander of the Santiago Police Brigade José Gregorio Gómez de Olivera, proposed to the Municipal Council the creation of a music band in the local police force, the first of its kind. On 11 March 1921, the a police was organized in Santiago at the suggestion of the Bernardo Gómez Solar. The merger of the existing police agencies was carried out in 1927, into a single institution of that nature called the Carabineros. On 24 May 1929, a Carabineros band was formed in the Aysén Region during the national annexation of the region. It was created on 25 July 1929 with the purpose of having a large military band for their institutional activities. It was established at the initiative of President Carlos Ibáñez del Campo. Its first director was German teacher Max Steyer Krauth. Today, the band is part of the Department of Educational Management Control of the Directorate of Education, Doctrine and History of the Carabineros de Chile.

== Activities ==
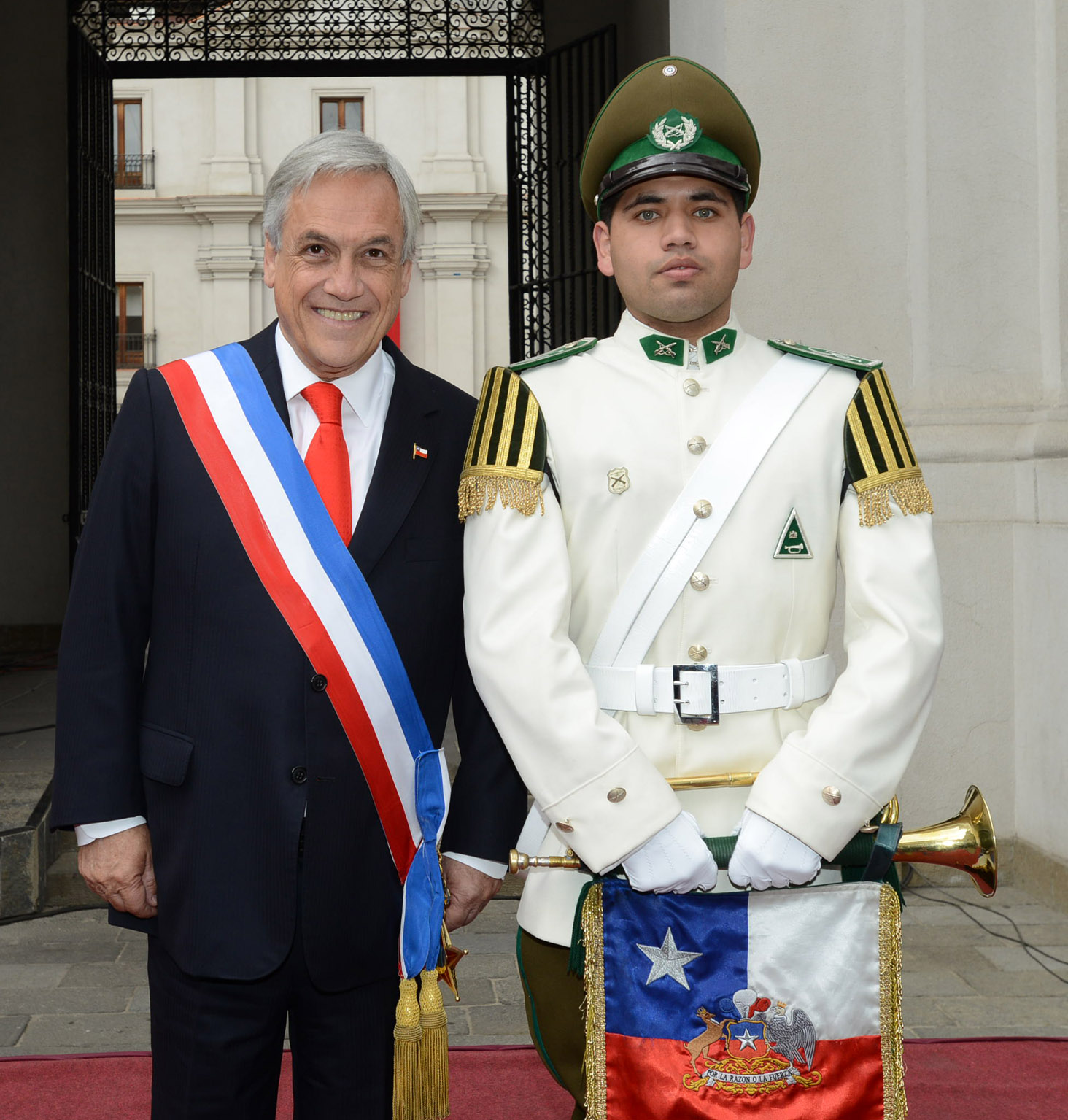
A band member with President Sebastián Piñera.

The national band generally performs during the guard mounting ceremony at the La Moneda Palace and Citizenry Square. State visits and public displays are also where the band can be seen. Its personnel are annual participants in the Great Military Parade of Chile. The Big Band often performs folk music with Chilean artists and folklorist. In April 2020, the band performed at the hospital "El Carmen" in support of those frontlines medical personnel combating COVID-19.

== See also ==
- Band of the National Police of Peru
- Fanfare du Palais National
- Escuadrilla de Bandas
- La Moneda Palace Guard
