= Guard mounting =

Formal military ceremony

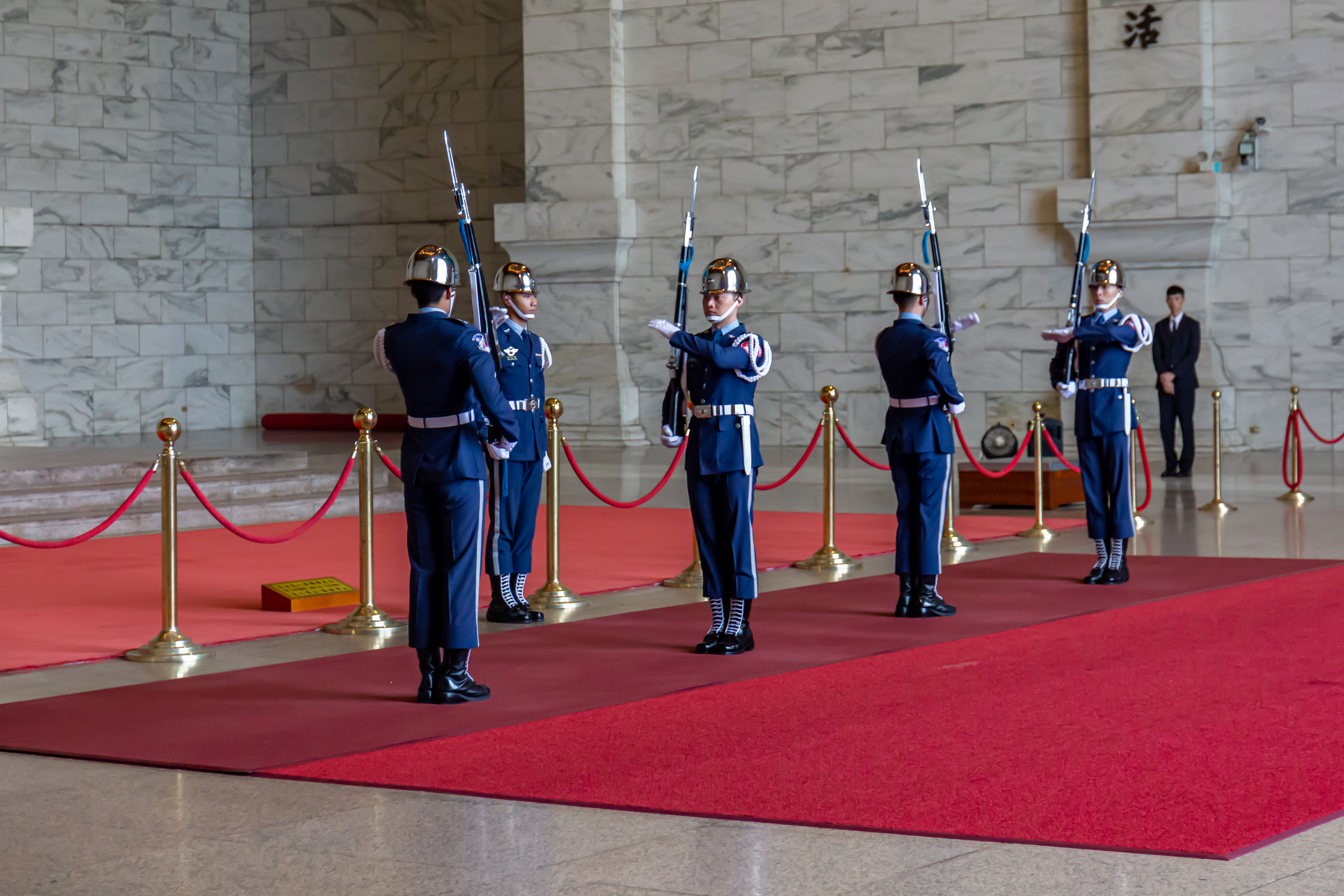
Changing of the guard at Chiang Kai-shek Memorial Hall.

Guard mounting, changing the guard, or the changing of the guard, is a formal ceremony in which sentries performing ceremonial guard duties at important institutions are relieved by a new batch of sentries. The ceremonies are often elaborate and precisely choreographed. They originated with peacetime and battlefield military drills introduced to enhance unit cohesion and effectiveness in the late 17th and early 18th centuries.

== Guard mounting by country ==
=== Argentina ===
Guard mounting ceremonies are held on Saturdays by the grounds of the Plaza de Mayo fronting the Casa Rosada by the Regiment of Mounted Grenadiers. Beginning in May 2024 - with the first edition also serving as the opening salvo to a month of celebrations of the 1810 May Revolution, a larger public ceremony is held there every first Saturday of the month by platoons of this regiment, the Regiment of Patricians and the 1st Artillery Regiment.

=== Armenia ===
Since September 2018, the President's Residence in Yerevan has had ceremonial sentries from the Honour Guard Battalion of the Ministry of Defense perform public duties at a pair of sentry boxes at the front of the residence. They are posted and relieved in a brief guard mounting ceremony, which includes an exhibition drill of all five guards (the incoming guards, the outgoing guards, and the guard commander). The guard mounting ceremony is held every Saturday and Sunday in the afternoon and evening.

=== Barbados ===
In Barbados, the Changing of the Sentry is an event that takes place in front of the 1804 Main Guard or Clock Tower. The guardsmen from the Barbados Defence Force are known today as The Main Guard. The sentries are drawn from members of the Barbados Legion, other retired personnel, and the Barbados Regiment. During the ceremony, a Corps of Drums from the Barbados Defence Force Band provide musical accompaniment. It is performed every Thursday morning.

=== Belarus ===
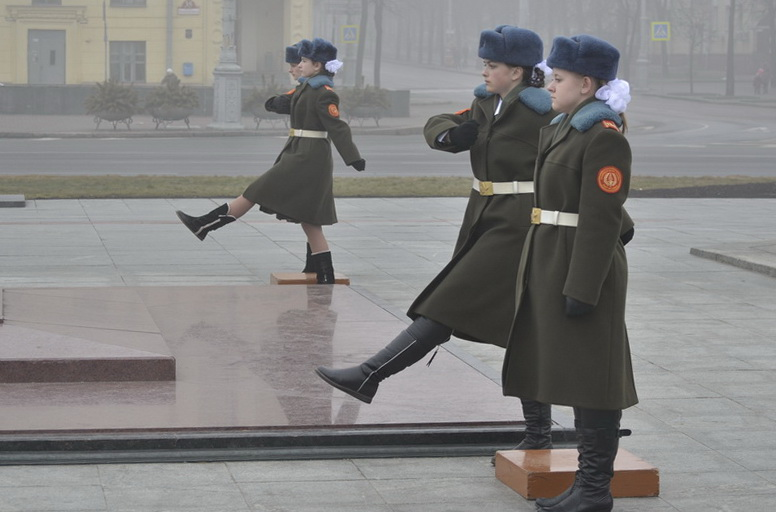
Pioneers and students mount the guard of honour at Victory Square in Minsk

In Minsk, Post #1 at Victory Square is the area where guard duty is carried out by members of the armed forces, including soldiers of the Honor Guard of the Armed Forces and cadets of the Military Academy of Belarus. Other organizations that also support guard duties at the square includes members of the Belarusian Republican Youth Union, the Border Guard Service Institute of Belarus, and students of general education schools and vocational schools of the city of Minsk. Post #1 was initiated on 3 July 1984, on the occasion of the 40th anniversary of the liberation of Minsk.

It consists of 26 students (17 boys and 9 girls) organized in the following way: the head of the guard of honor, the assistant to the head of the guard of honor, 4 guards (boys), 8 boys in the first four-shift, 8 girls, 1-3 boys sentries at the banner, on-duty signalman (girl). The guard of honor served at Post No. 1 for one week from 9.00 to 17.00 in the cold and from 9.00 to 18.00 in the warm time of the day. The duration of each shift is 10 to 20 minutes. The only breaks in maintaining the honorary were from 15 May to 1 November 1988, from 1 June to 20 November 2003, and from 1 December 2003 to 20 April 2004.

=== Bulgaria ===
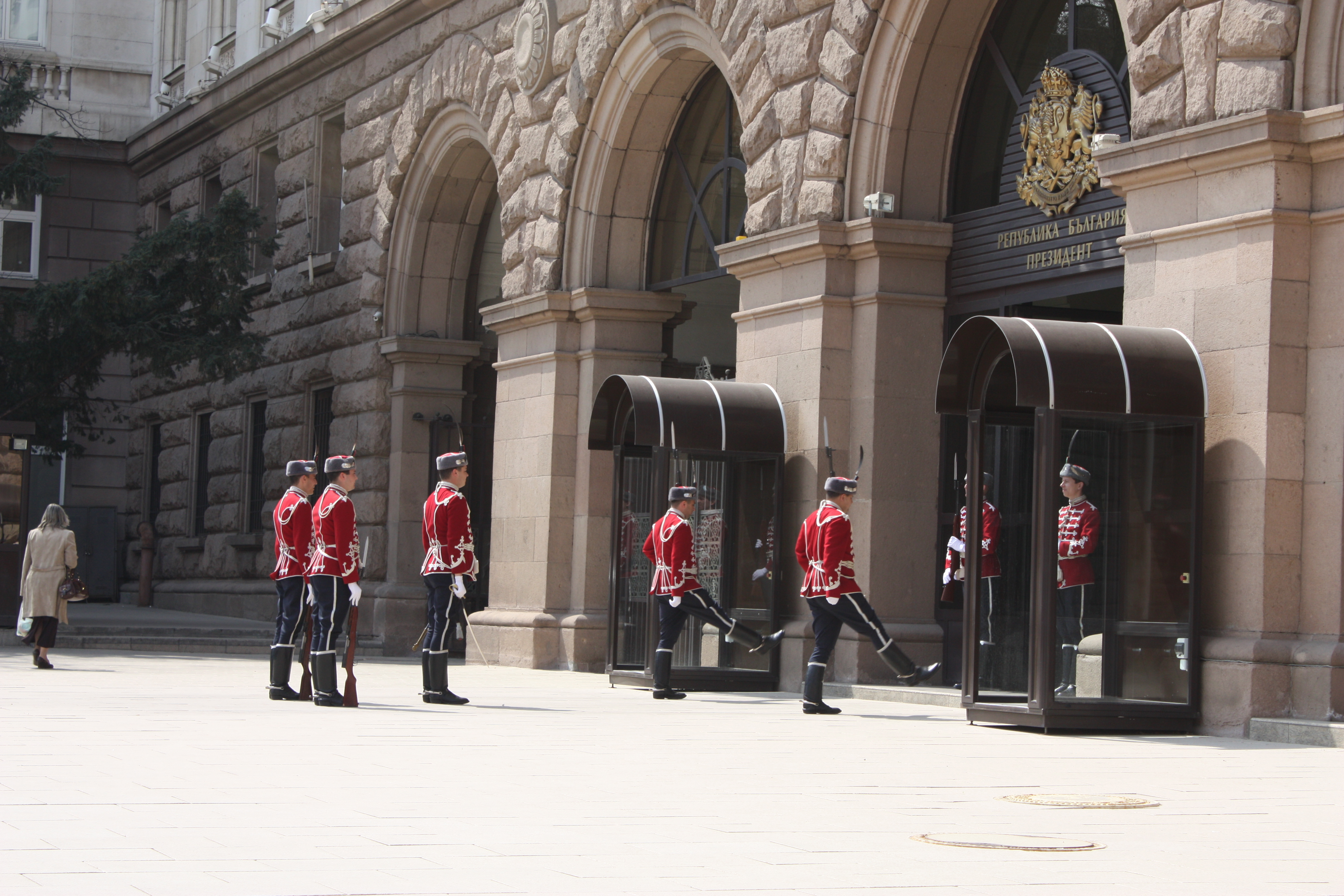
Members of the National Guards Unit of Bulgaria during a guard mounting ceremony.

The ceremony of the changing of the guard of honour in front of the presidency has taken place at 12:00 noon every day since November 5, 2003. It also takes place at the Monument to the Unknown Soldier in Sofia. The National Guards Unit of Bulgaria is the sole participant in this ceremony.

=== Canada ===
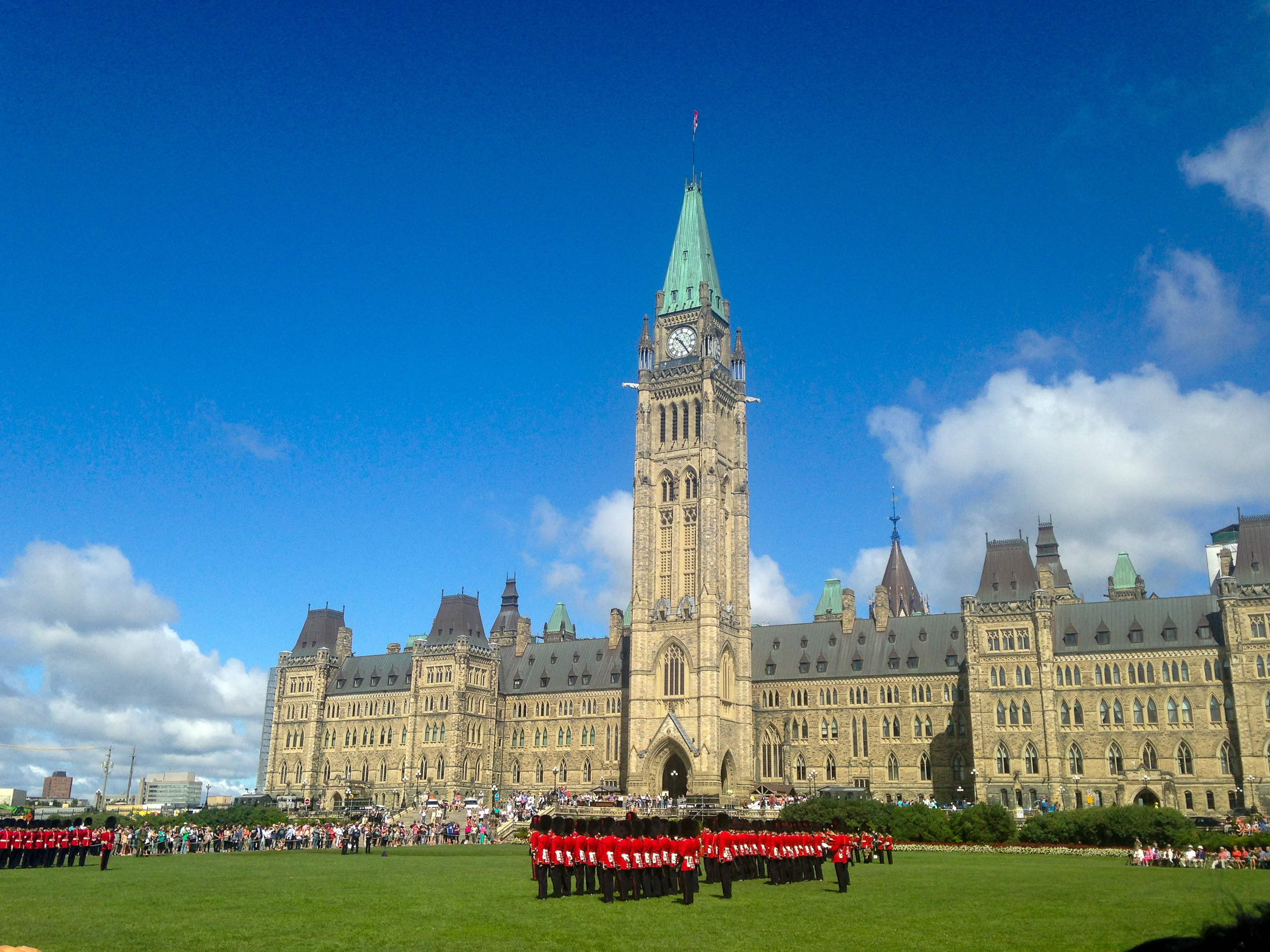
Changing of the Guard ceremony held at Parliament Hill, 2015

Public duties in Ottawa, Canada's national capital, is formally the responsibility of two regiments of foot guards, the Canadian Grenadier Guards, and the Governor General's Foot Guards; with one of their main tasks being the provision of sentries for guard mountings for official state functions in support of the Government of Canada in Ottawa.

The Canadian Army also operates a summer public duties detachment known as the Ceremonial Guard, which assumes public duties in Ottawa from late-June to late-August. The Ceremonial Guard is made up of regulars or reservists of the Canadian Army, although its membership is also augmented by regulars and reservists of the Royal Canadian Air Force, and the Royal Canadian Navy. The Ceremonial Guard mount the guard at the National War Memorial, Rideau Hall, and Parliament Hill. Members of the Ceremonial Guard wear the uniforms of the Canadian foot guards, as they have historically staffed the summer public duties detachment, before membership in the Ceremonial Guard was opened to the entire Canadian Armed Forces. The Ceremonial Guard are considered an ad hoc detachment, as its members are drawn from various units of the armed forces, and does not constitute a permanent unit in the Canadian Forces' order of battle.

The Canadian Armed Forces also maintains a National Sentry Program, where its members perform guard mountings for its sentries at the National War Memorial from early-April to 10 November, the day before Remembrance Day. The program formally falls under the command structure of the Ceremonial Guard, although its volunteers may wear the full dress uniform of their respective units/service.

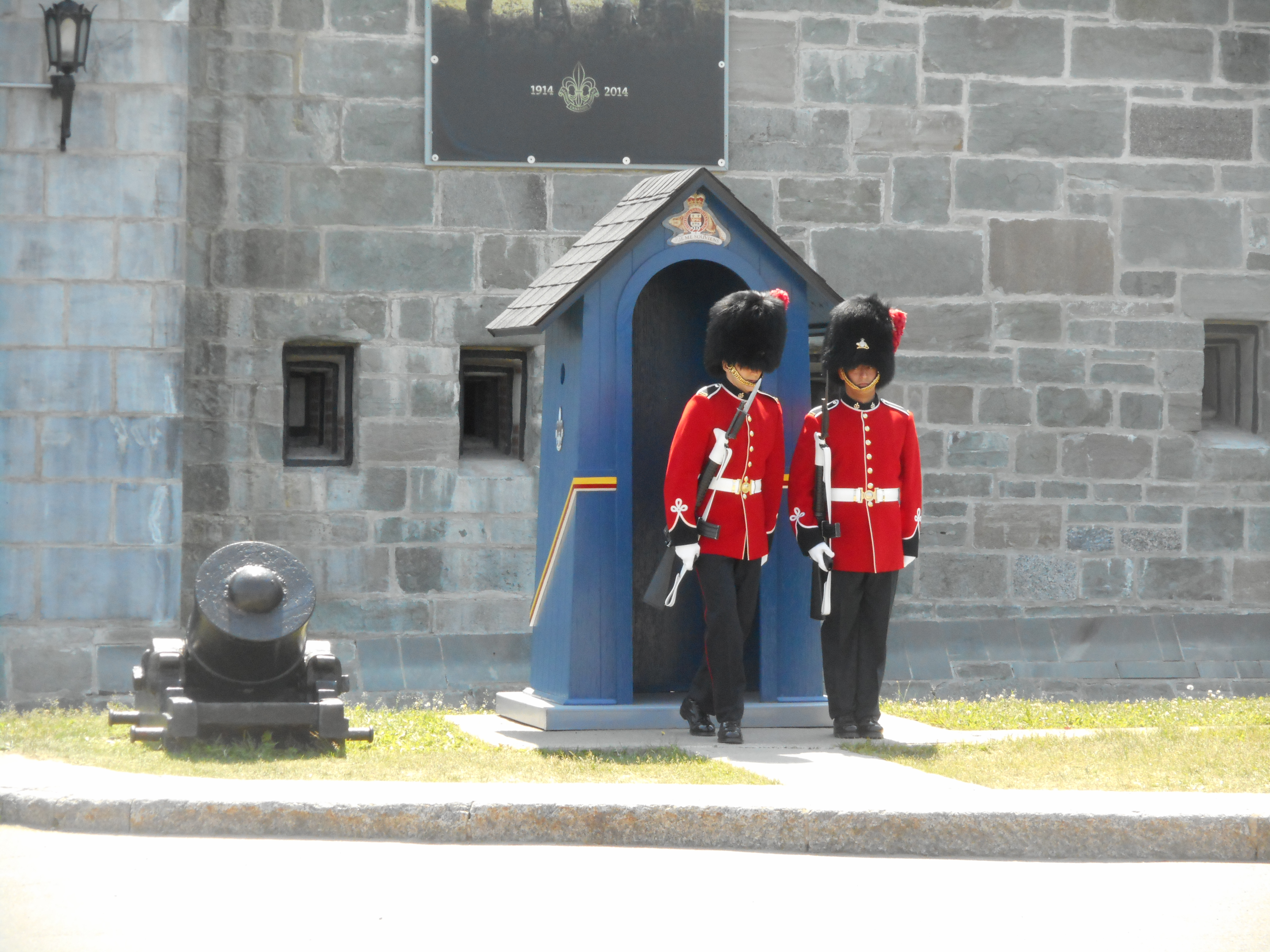
A sentry of the Royal 22nd Regiment in the process of being relieved by his replacement, at the Citadelle of Quebec

Guard mountings are also carried out at the Citadelle of Quebec in Quebec City, a military installation, and secondary residence of the Monarch and Governor General. The Royal 22nd Regiment mounts the guard at the Citadelle from late-June to Labour Day (the first Monday of September). The regiment has carried out guard mountings at the Citadelle since 1928, excluding a brief hiatus from 1939 to 1945, due to the Second World War. Guard mountings have also been performed in other Canadian cities outside Ottawa and Quebec City, with guard mountings having been performed at various provincial capitals, typically at the legislature, or the official residences of the lieutenant governors. However, public duties in Ottawa and Quebec are the only regularly scheduled guard mountings in the country.

Several non-military organizations also perform reenactments of past and historical guard mountings ceremonies at Officer’s Square Fredericton, New Brunswick (suspended since 2024), and at Citadel Hill in Halifax.

=== Chile ===
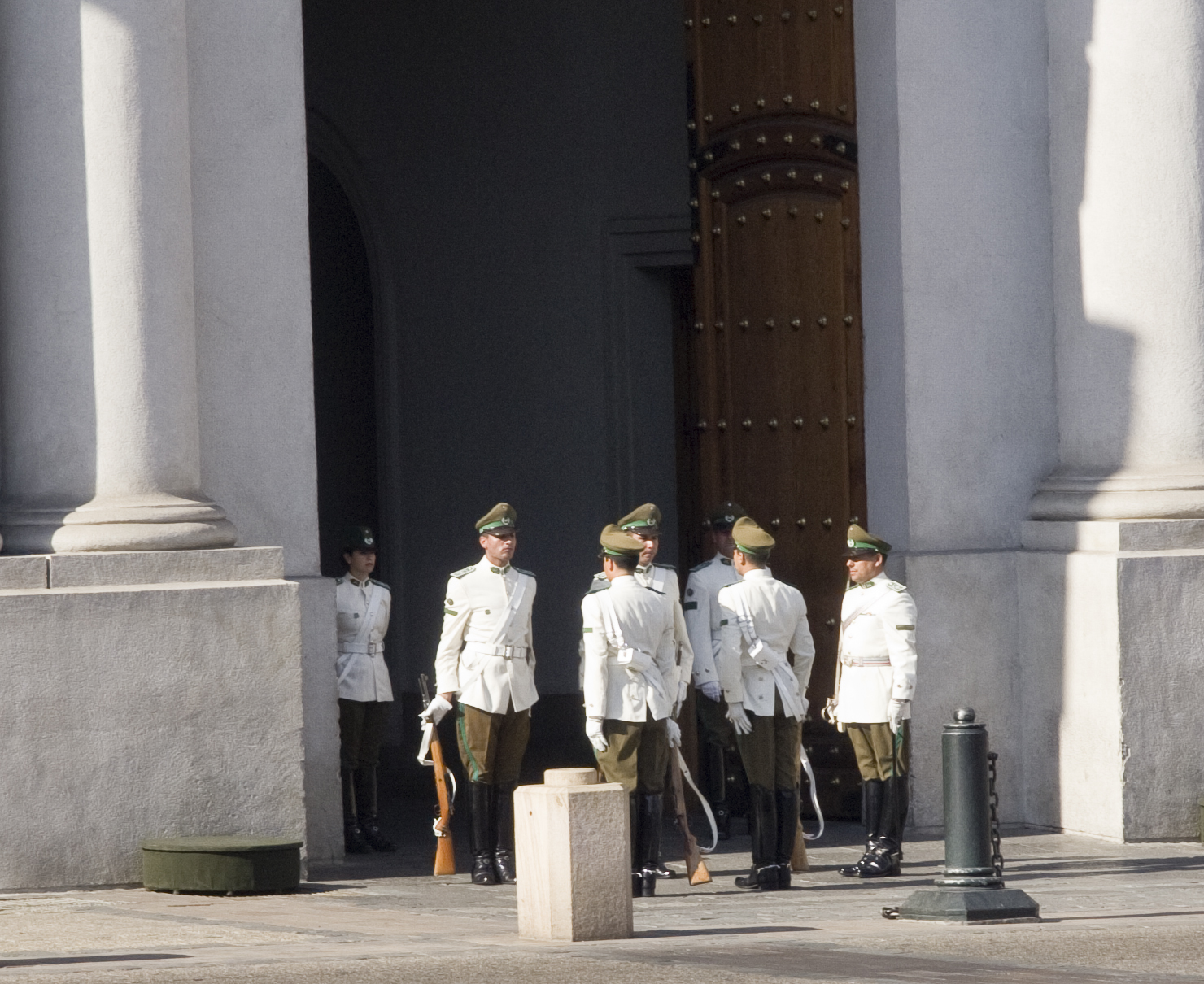
A guard mounting ceremony at Palacio de La Moneda.

The changing of the guard ceremony is conducted every odd-numbered day, including Sundays, at La Moneda Palace in Santiago, Chile with the Carabineros de Chile's Presidential Guard Group providing the guard, the changing of the guard has been taking place since 1851. A pair of mounted units lead the Central Band, Drums and Bugles of the Carabineros and the new guard, to the plaza in front of La Moneda where the departing detachment meets them. While patriotic and popular music is played, the colour guard emerges and salutes are exchanged between the old and new guards at the main gate and by the officers of each unit. The ceremony ends with the band, drums and bugles marching off with the old guard.

The ceremony is an important tourist attraction that takes place in the Plaza de la Constitución on alternate days at 10 a.m. However, when there are events in the Plaza de la Constitución, the ceremony is moved to the south façade of the Palacio de la Moneda to the Plaza de la Ciudadanía.

=== China ===
The changing of the guard in Beijing, the capital of the People's Republic of China, may refer to three different ceremonies of the People's Liberation Army on Tiananmen Square. The first is a traditional changing of the guard consisting of two incoming soldiers, two outgoing soldiers and a commander from the People's Armed Police Honour Guard Battalion, with the incoming and outgoing soldiers saluting the flagpole before taking up their posts beside it. The other changing of the guard is the raising of the Flag of China on the square every morning, which since 2018, consists of personnel from the Beijing Garrison Honor Guard Battalion who took over duties from the PAP, which itself had performed the ceremony since 1982 until that point.

Another changing of the guard ceremony takes place at the Mausoleum of Mao Zedong, which contains the preserved body of Mao Zedong, at the southern end of Tianamen Square, right exactly where the Gate of China once stood. The Beijing Garrison Honor Guard Battalion also performs this ceremony.

At Xinhuamen the ceremonial changing of guards is performed by the Central Guard Regiment. Two members of the Central Guard Regiment ceremonial personnel, armed with ceremonial rifles, guarding the gate. The ceremony occurs every 2 hours.

=== Cuba ===
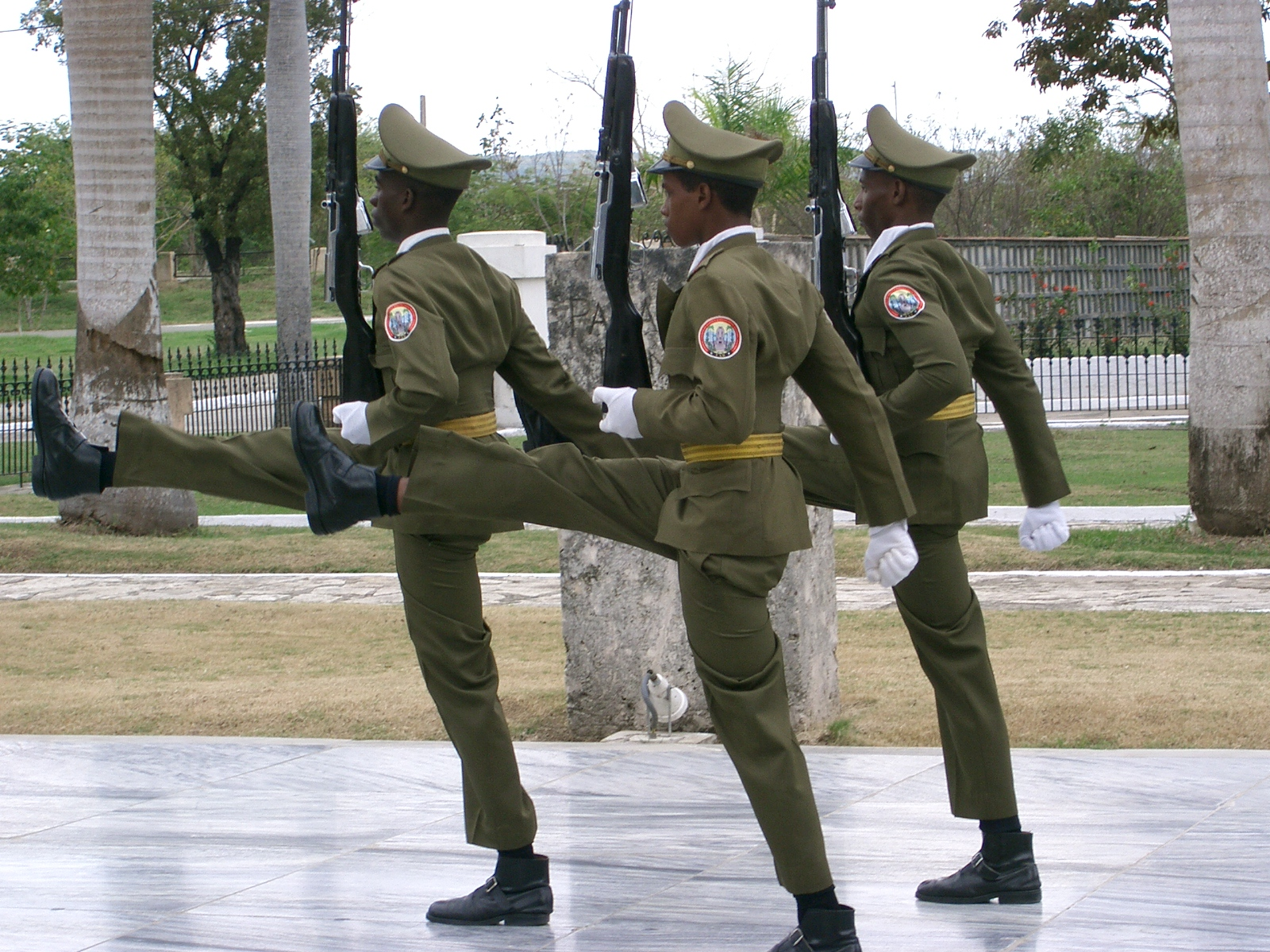
Ceremonial Unit of the Cuban Revolutionary Armed Forces on their way to relieve guards at the Mausoleum of José Marti.

Soldiers of the Ceremonial Unit of the Cuban Revolutionary Armed Forces guard the Mausoleum of José Marti in Santiago de Cuba. The guard is changed every half-hour, and is signaled by clock tower bells similar to how Soviet guards at the Lenin mausoleum used the bells of the Spasskaya Tower Clock. Patriotic music is played while the next batch of guards march to relive the previous detachment. The music is usually played from audio speakers located around the mausoleum instead of by a live band.

=== Czech Republic ===
Every day at noon the guard of Prague Castle (seat of the President of the Czech Republic) is changed. The Prague Castle Guard is the unit that provides the sentries for the ceremony.

=== Denmark ===
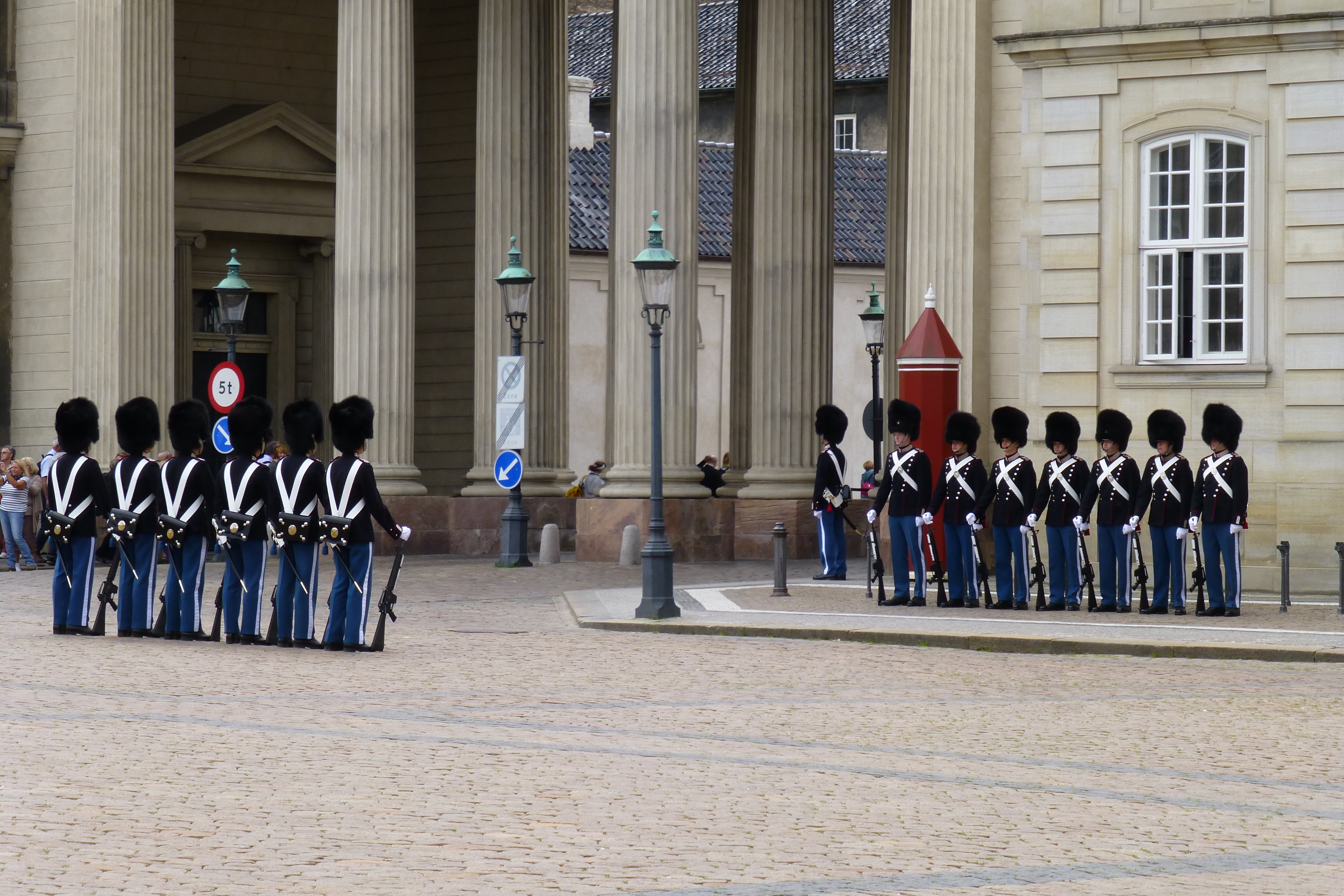
Danish Royal Life Guard during a changing of the guard ceremony

At Amalienborg Palace, the royal residence in Copenhagen, the Royal Guard, mounted by the Kongelige Livgarde, is on duty for 24 hours, and the relief takes place every day at noon. The parade starts off from the barracks by Rosenborg Castle. There are three types of guard changes. A kongevagt (King's Watch) is when the monarch is in residence, and is accompanied by the Royal Guards music band. A løjtnantsvagt (Lieutenant Watch) is when Prince Henrik was residing at the palace or Crown Prince Frederik or Prince Joachim are residing at Amalienborg in the capacity of regents. The Løjtnantsvagt is accompanied by the Corps of Drums of the Royal Life Guards. A palævagt' (Manor Watch) is when the Crown Prince or Prince Joachim are in residence but not in the capacity of regents or the Palace is uninhabited. A palævagt march through Copenhagen is undertaken without music accompaniment.

=== Ghana ===
The changing of the guard at Jubilee House (formerly Flagstaff House) takes place every month, with personnel of the different branches of the Ghana Armed Forces taking part quarterly (every 3 months). The ceremony started on May 5, 2013, originating from the changing of the Queens Guard at Buckingham Palace in London. Differences in the two ceremonies include a drill demonstration by the new and old guards, as well as the attendance of the Ghanaian president at the ceremony.

=== Greece ===
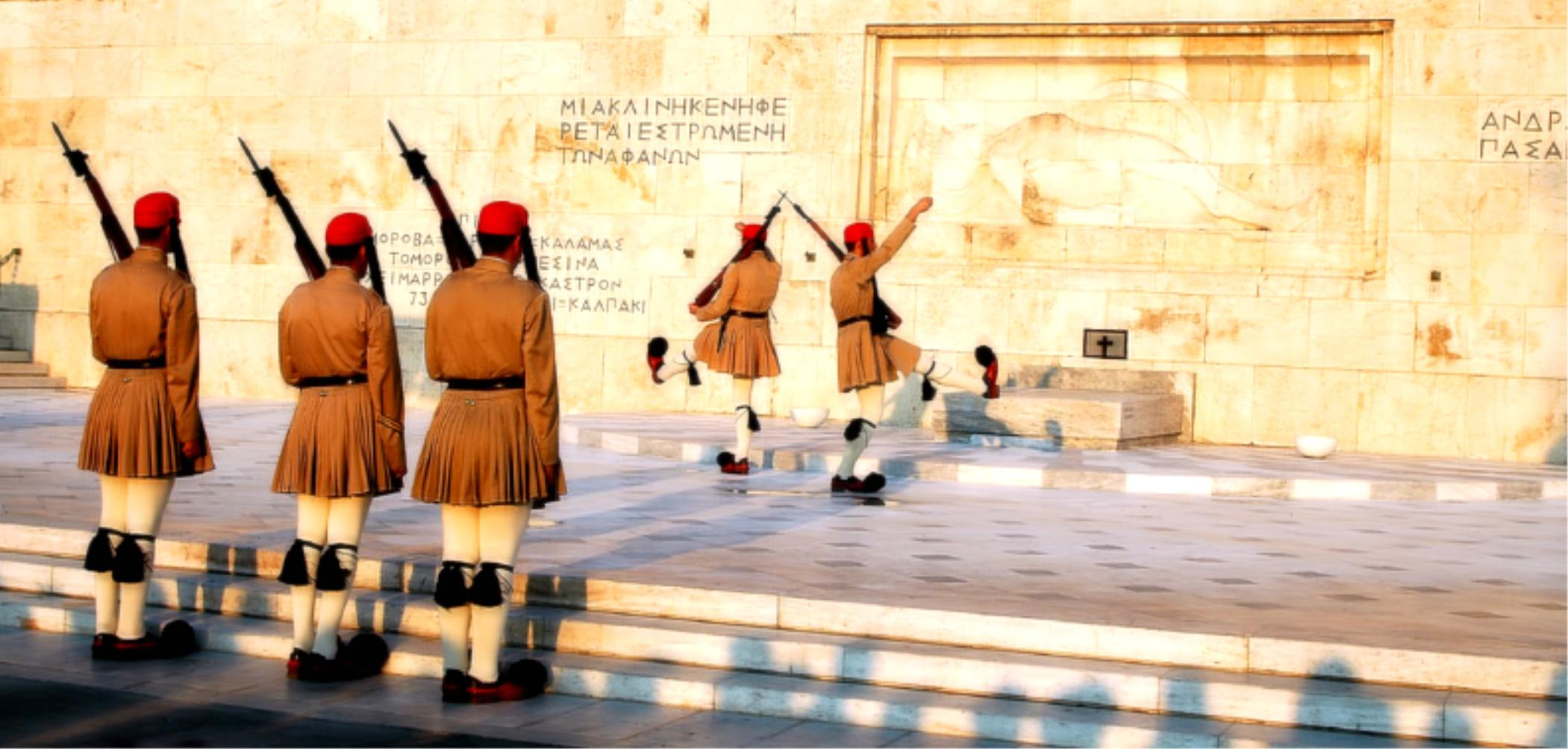
Greek Presidential Guard during the Changing of the Guard at the Greek Tomb of the Unknown Soldier

In the state capital, Athens, members of the Presidential Guard provide a 24-hour honour guard, with an hourly guard change, at the Presidential Mansion and at the Tomb of the Unknown Soldier, off Syntagma Square at the foot of the Hellenic Parliament. The Changing the Guard at the Tomb of the Unknown Soldier, in particular, has become a tourist attraction, with many people watching the guards, who stand motionless for two 20-minute intervals during their 1-hour shifts.

Every Sunday at 11:00 a ceremonial change of guards takes place. A parade of Evzones and a military band starts from the barracks of the Evzones (just behind the Parliament Building) and through Vasilissis Sofias Avenue, and reaches the Tomb of the Unknown Soldier, where a ceremonial change of guards takes place. On this occasion, all the three official uniforms of the Evzones can be seen. Vasilissis Sofias Avenue and Amalias Avenue are briefly closed to traffic for the ceremony from about 10:55 to 11:05 on Sunday mornings.

=== Hungary ===
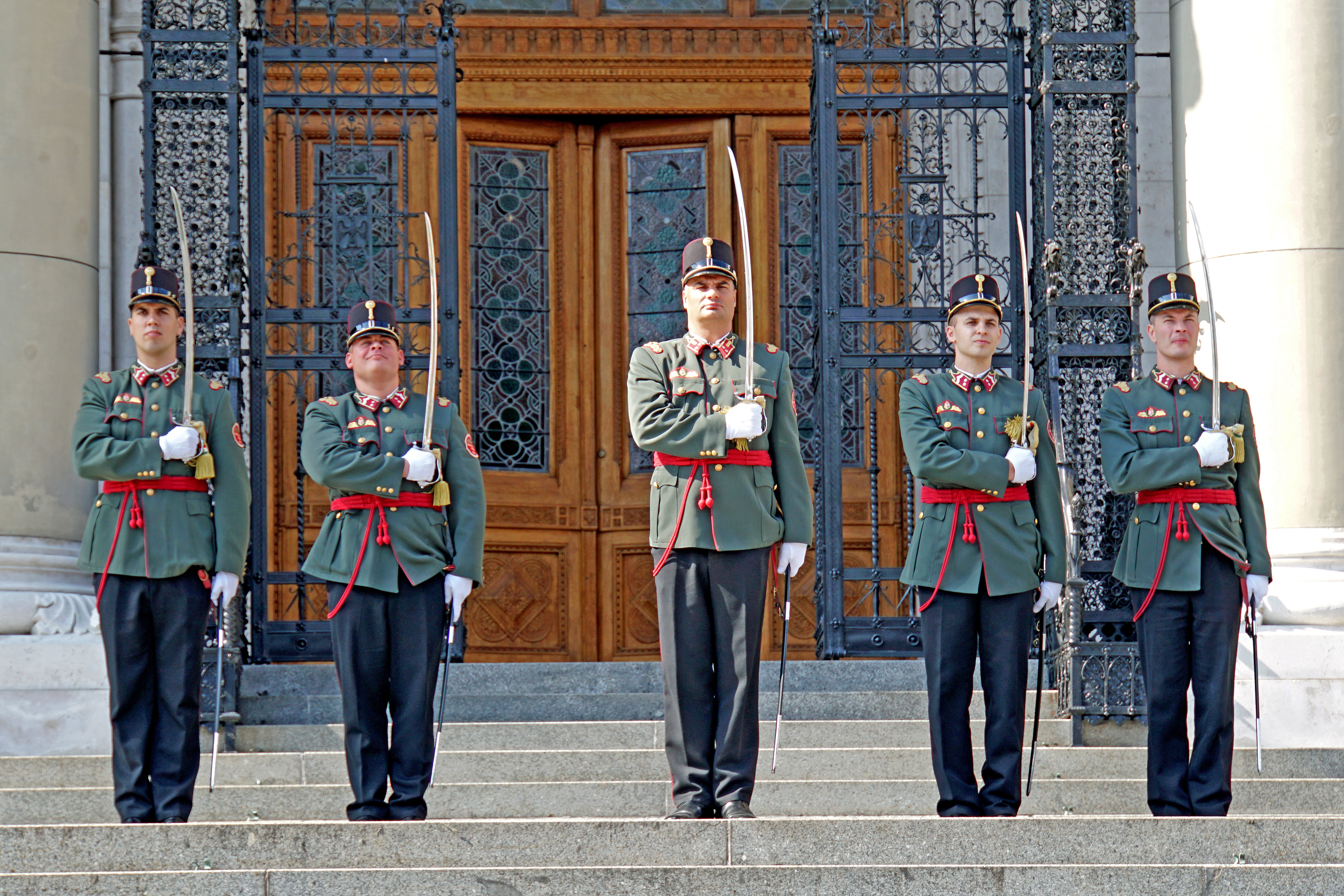
Changing of the guard at the Hungarian Parliament Building.

The Honour Guard of the Hungarian Defence Forces, the 32nd Budapest Guard and Ceremonial Regiment has provided sentries for the Sándor Palace in Budapest since the disestablishment of the Hungarian People's Republic in 1989. This is done at the gates of the palace, due to its status as the official residence of the President of Hungary. The ceremony was initiated in 2003 when President Ferenc Mádl moved into the palace. The sentries come at noon in a team of six, although only two of them will actually take up the guard. A drummer and officer are also present. Another guard changing ceremony is held inside the Domed Hall of the Hungarian Parliament Building on Kossuth Square, where guards protect the Holy Crown of Hungary. At both ceremonies, an exhibition drill is performed during the mounting of the guard at noon, with the latter having musical accompaniment.

Public duties by the regiment are also provided by a four-man team at the Tomb of the Unknown Soldier at the Millennium Monument on Hősök tere (Heroes Square). The 7015th Ceremonial Regiment of the Hungarian People's Army also conduct public duties at the tomb.

=== Indonesia ===
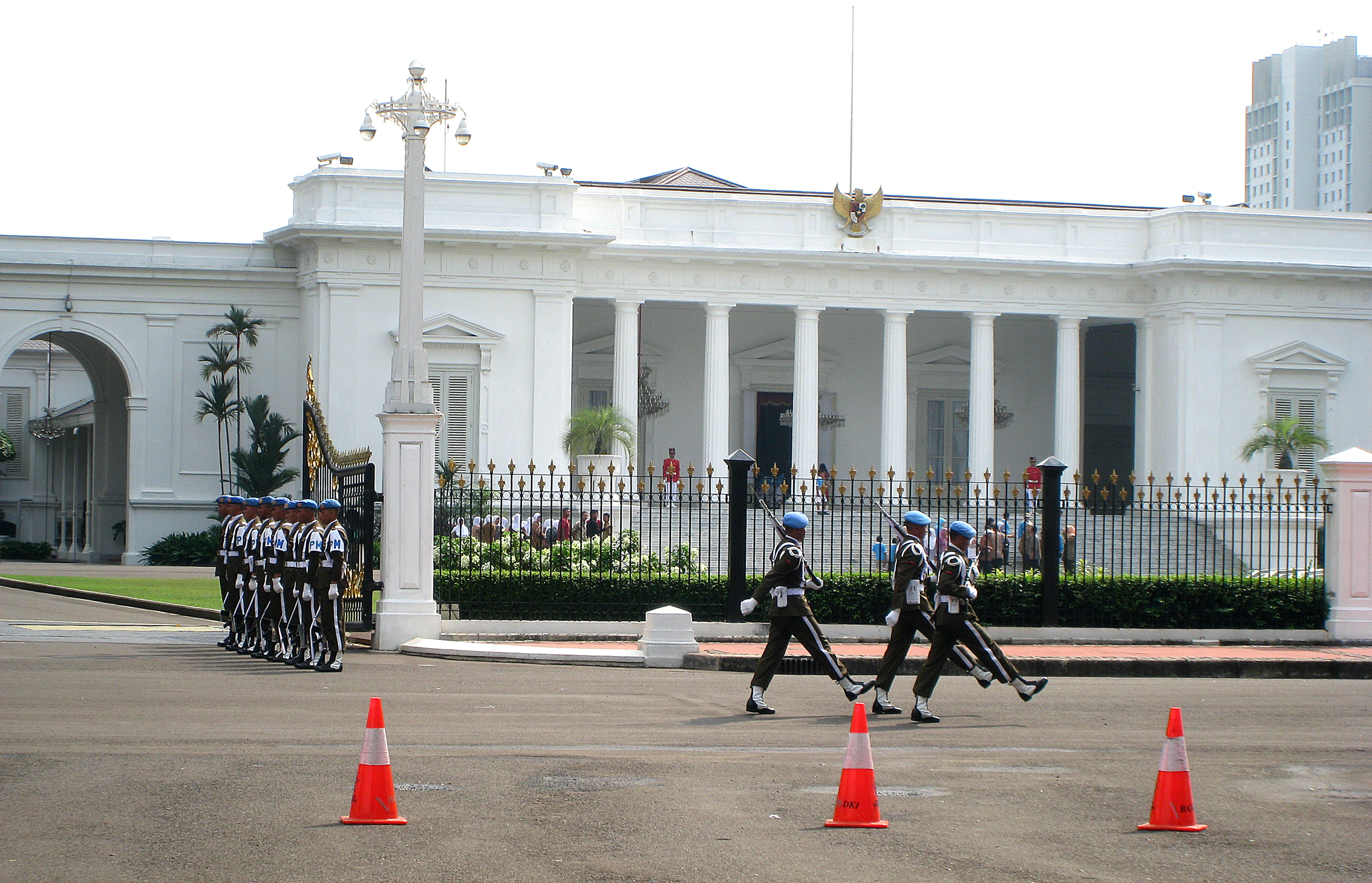
Changing of the guard ceremony at Merdeka Palace in Indonesia

Since the leadership of president Joko Widodo, the changing of the guard ceremony at Merdeka Palace has been performed by the elite presidential force of Indonesia known as Paspampres. It has been open to the public since 17 July 2016. Initially it was held on the Sunday of the second week of each month in front of the palace yard; since 28 August 2016 it is held on the last Sunday of the month. The ceremony commences at 7 am and is open to public and tourist viewing. Group A of Paspampres, which guards the president and the palace, is responsible for this ceremony.

=== India ===
A ceremonial changing of the guard is held at the President of India's official place of residence, the Rashtrapati Bhavan. The ceremony is generally held every Saturday at 08:00 am (Summer), 10:00 am (Winter). The old and new guard consists of a troop from the President's Body Guard and a company drawn from either one of the battalions from the Brigade of the Guards or one of the other regiments of the Indian Army if assigned for palace security duties. A military band is also present to provide accompaniment.

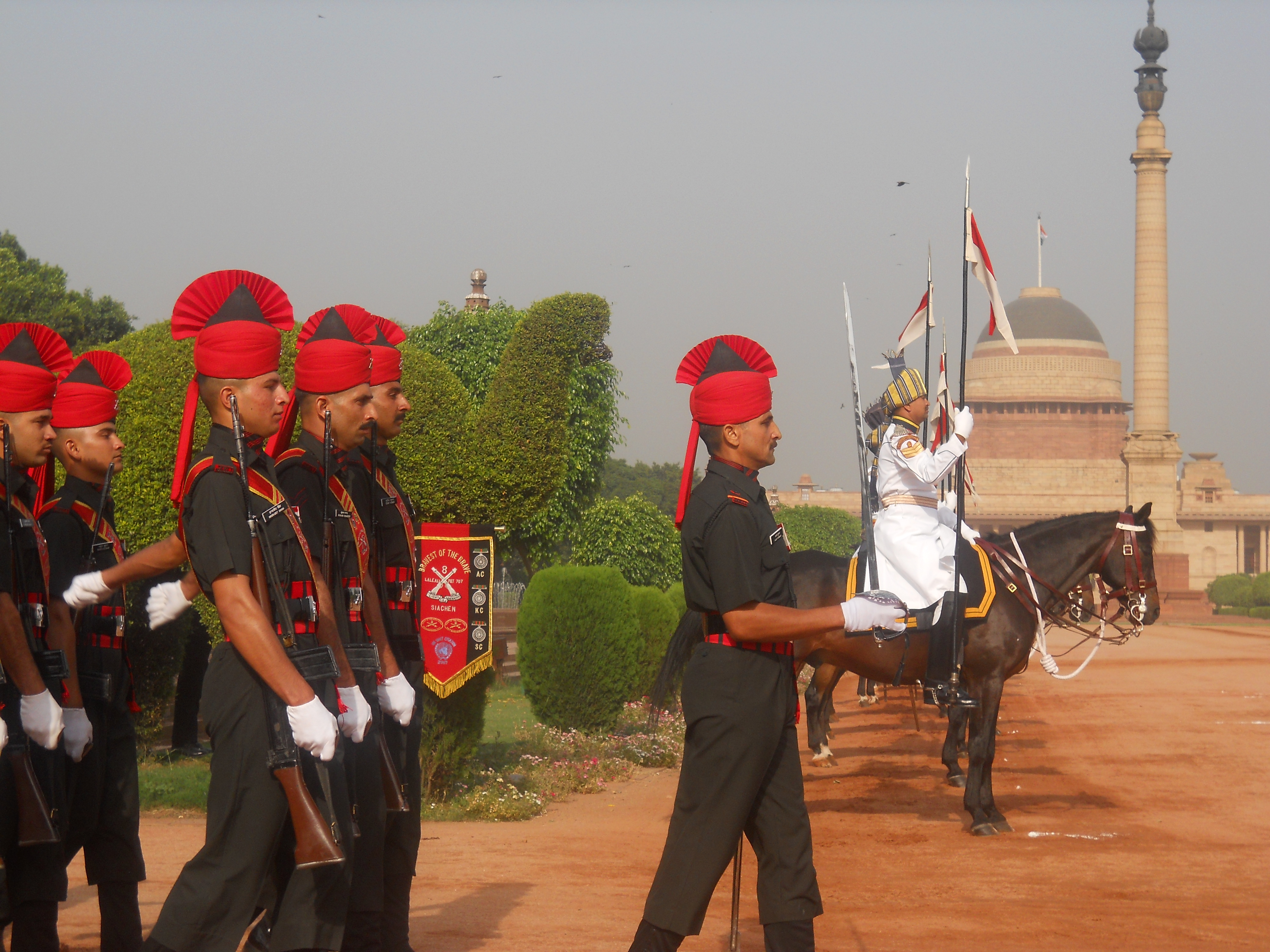
The President's Bodyguard during a changing of the guard ceremony at Rashtrapati Bhavan, the official residence of the President of India

When the New Guard is formed up between the Dominion columns of the North Block, sentries are nominated and the respective guards are inspected by their officers as the band plays 'Sammaan Guard' (The Honour Guard). The men of the President's Bodyguard consist of the old warrior classes of the Rajputs, Sikhs and the Jats. Recruitment standards are strict and the minimum height of each soldier is six feet (1.83 m).

After the inspection is over, a formal march takes place into the forecourt of the Rashtrapati Bhavan with the band playing "Sher-E-Jawan" (Tiger of a soldier), The New Guard forms up along with the Old Guard to await the formal order of "Salami Shastra" (Present Arms) by the latter to the former, signifying readiness for the change-over. Accompanied by the tune "Robinson", a key is handed over between the Junior Commissioned Officers of the Old and New Guard. This symbolizes the exchange of responsibilities between commanders.

Sentries of the Old Guard rejoin and the Junior Commissioned Officers return to their posts. The Old Guard marches off to the tune "Saare Jahan Se Achcha" (Better than any nation). Compliments are paid by the New Guard which has assumed charge and the balance of the New Guard marches off along with the band playing "Amar Jawan" (Immortal Soldier), and the troopers march off following the new guard.

=== Italy ===
On the occasions of the Festival of the Tricolour on January 7, the anniversary of the unification of Italy on March 17 and the Italian Republic Day on June 2, the Changing of the Guard at the Quirinal Palace is performed in its solemn form by the Corazzieri Regiment and by the mounted band of the Carabinieri 4th Cavalry Regiment, with the guards wearing their ceremonial dress uniforms and riding horses.

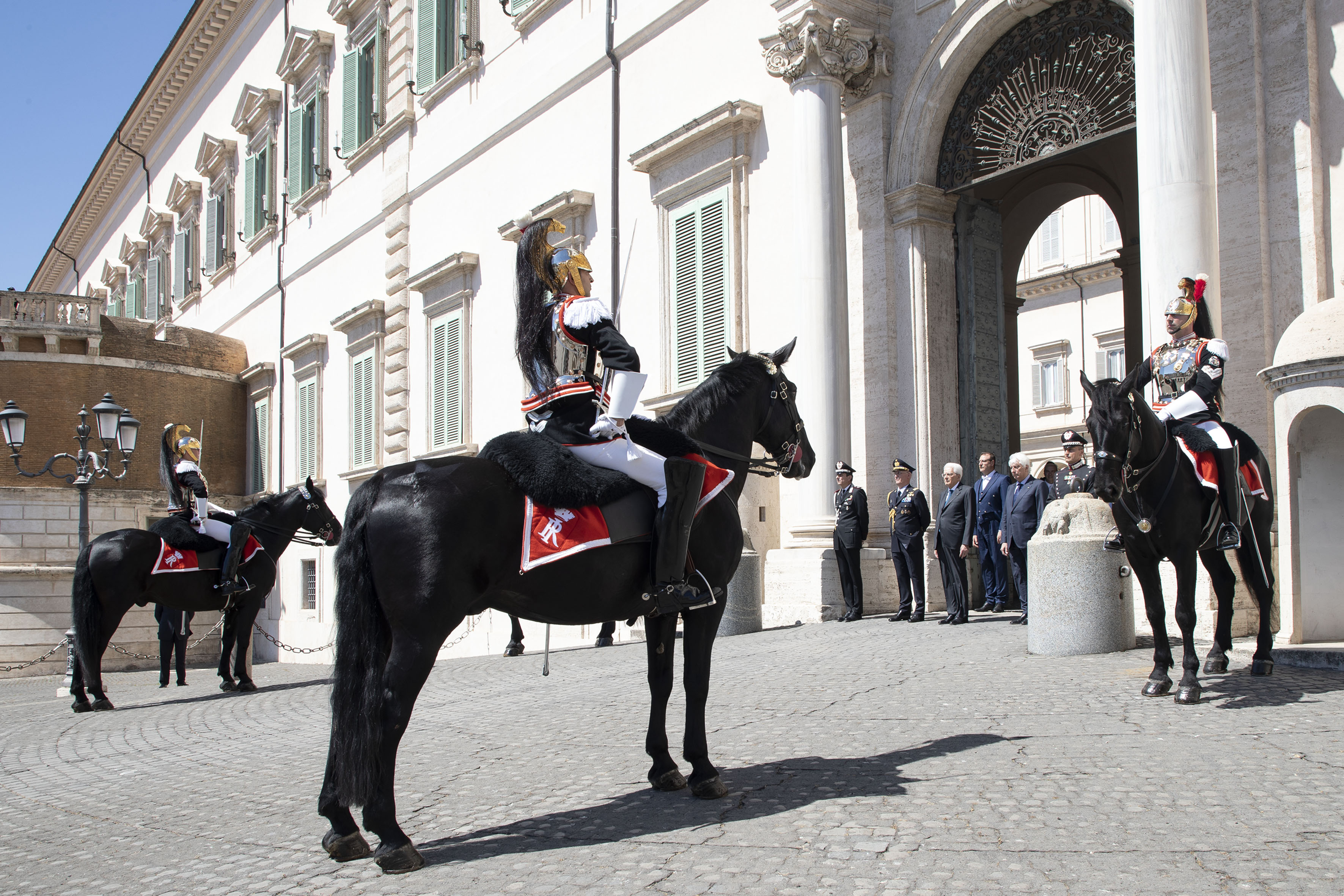
Mounted Corazzieri during a guard mounting ceremony.

Every other day the Changing of the Guard takes place at the same hour, 18:00 during the summer and 16:00 for the rest of the year, and involves a military band from every service branch of the Italian Armed Forces and/or the State Police and other services (Vigili del Fuoco, Red Cross, and Prisons Police) only if the President is in the Palace. The incoming unit marches into the internal courtyard in front of the outgoing unit, which presents arms and later again with the new guard to the tune of Il Canto degli Italiani. Then the sentinels of the outgoing unit surrender their posts to the sentinels of the incoming unit, and then the incoming unit presents arms as the outgoing unit marches out with an NCO or Warrant officer leading the old and new guard sentinels.

Similar protocols are followed every hour by the honour guards stationed at the gates of the seats of the Chamber of Deputies and the Senate, at the tomb of the unknown soldier at the Altare della Patria, and at the gates of the Quirinal Palace. In these cases, a sub-officer leads the incoming unit in front of the standing guards, and leads the outgoing unit after they have surrendered their posts. Units forming for the regular mounting in various parts of Rome come from, aside from servicemen from the Carabineri, various units of the Italian Army, Navy, Air Force and the Financial Guard, and even the Italian State Police, and their respective bands provide the musical accompaniment to the Quirinal Palace ceremony.

=== Jamaica ===
The Jamaica Regiment is responsible for the Jamaica Defence Forces changing of the guard at National Heroes Park in the capital of Kingston. The guard consists of two sentries at the entrance to the park, both of which are accompanied by a relief commander during the ceremony. A changing of the guard ceremony at the police headquarters is also held by female personnel of the Jamaica Constabulary Force and the JCF Band.

=== Kazakhstan ===
The Aibyn Presidential Regiment of the State Security Service of Kazakhstan have taken part in the changing of the guard ceremony in the Ak Orda Presidential Palace since 2001.

=== Kyrgyzstan ===
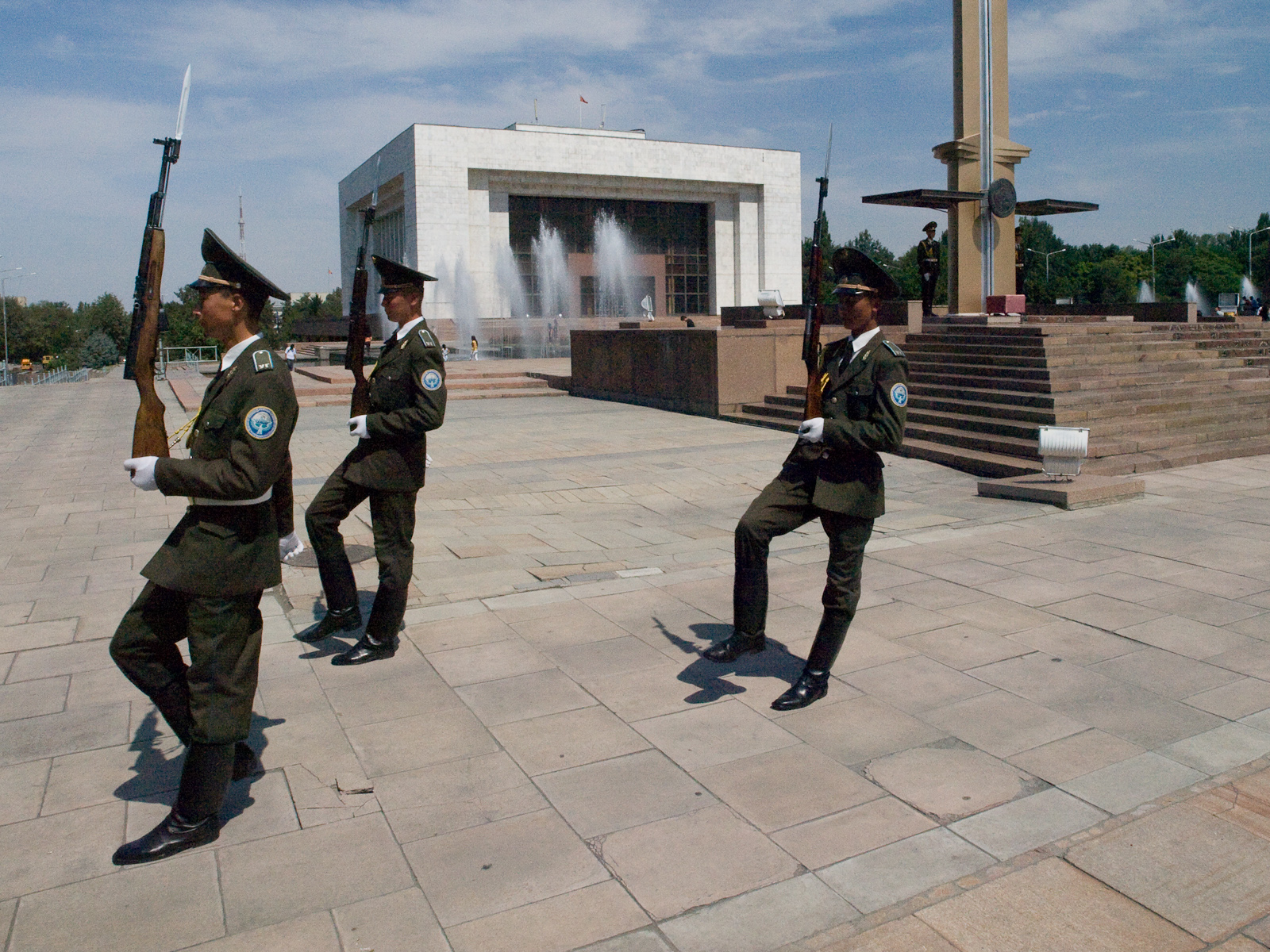
Members of the National Guard of Kyrgyzstan during the changing the guard ceremony in Bishkek.

Soldiers of the honour guard company of the National Guard of Kyrgyzstan guard the central flagpole on Ala-Too Square in the capital of Bishkek. They have changed guard every hour since 1998. A similar ceremony is held at the Tomb of the Unknown Soldier on Victory Square.

=== Latvia ===
The guards of the Honour Guard Company of the Staff Battalion of the National Armed Forces change every hour between 9:00 a.m. and 6:00 p.m. every day at the Freedom Monument. Aside from the two guard sentries, an additional two watchmen stand nearby to look out for their security.

=== Malaysia ===
The Changing of the Guard takes place in front of the Istana Negara, Jalan Duta in Kuala Lumpur daily at 12 o'clock, with the 1st Battalion, Royal Malay Regiment of the Malaysian Army providing the guard alongside the Mounted Ceremonial Squadron of the Malaysian Royal Armoured Corps. Every month, a larger ceremony is held outside the palace's main gate modeled on the ceremony in London, wherein the Central Band of the Royal Malay Regiment plays appropriate music as the battalion's guard duty detachment is changed from each of the companies that make up the battalion.

=== Moldova ===
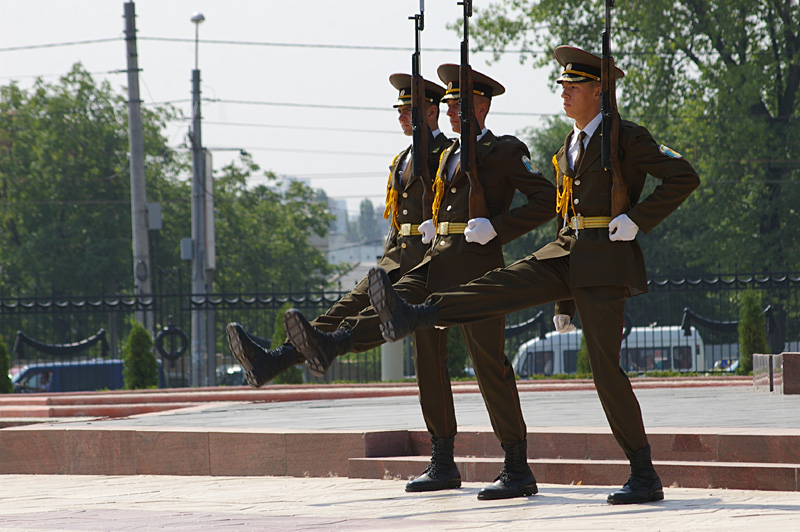
The Moldovan Honour Guard Company guard mounting ceremony at the Eternity Memorial Complex.

The changing of the guards ceremony is performed by four members of the Honour Guard Company of the Moldovan National Army at the Eternity Memorial Complex in Chișinău.

=== Monaco ===
The Changing the Guard takes place in front of the Prince's Palace daily at 11:55. It is performed by the Compagnie des Carabiniers du Prince.

=== Norway ===
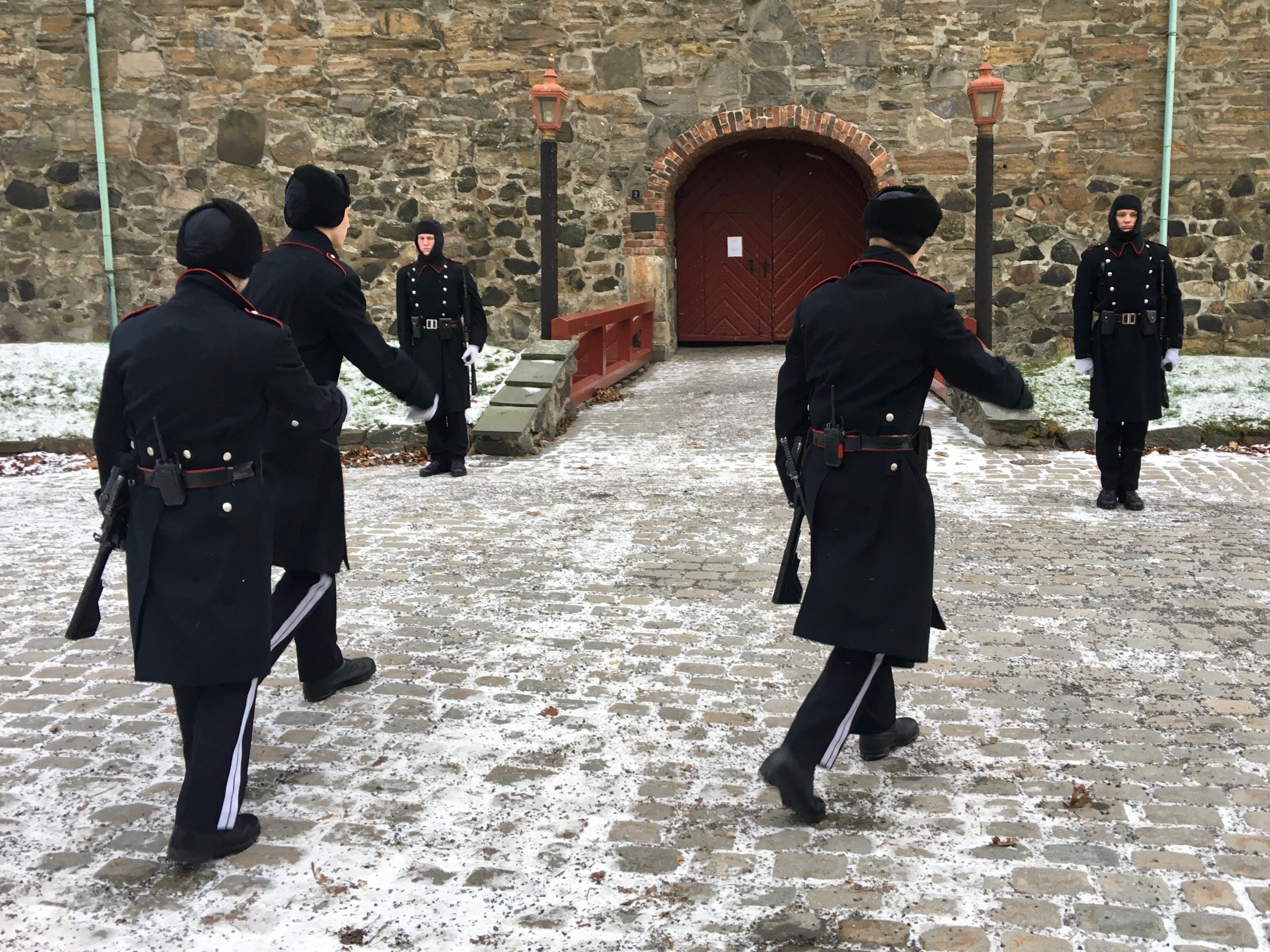
Members of the Hans Majestet Kongens Garde prepare to relieve guardsmen at Akershus Fortress.

In the state capital, Oslo, His Majesty the King's Guard keeps the Royal Palace and the Royal Family guarded for 24 hours a day. Every day at 1330 hrs, there is a Change of Guards outside the Palace. The ceremony consists of two parts and lasts for about 40 minutes. Otherwise, the guards work in shifts of two hours. The Guards are also stationed at Akershus Fortress, where the Change of Guards also takes place at 1330 hrs. They also guard the residence of the Crown Prince and Crown Princess, and their own camp, Gardeleiren, outside Oslo.

The two last of these duties are considered "green watches": the guards wear battle uniform, an olive and green uniform featuring a short jacket, shirt and tie and the guard's unique forage cap. The famous parade uniform dating from 1860, which consists of a wide-brimmed hat with black plume, dark blue tunic and trousers with white stripes, is worn on the more prestigious palace and fortress watches. Usually, during the summer, there are Guard Parades, where the New Guard marches from Akershus Fortress accompanied by a band, through Oslo's parade street to Karl Johan's Gate.

His Majesty the King's Guard consists of male conscripts who are undertaking their compulsory military service but also includes women who volunteer to join the Guards. His Majesty the King's Guard is organized as a battalion, with a Lieutenant Colonel as chief. The battalion has seven companies. Each company consists of about 200 guards, and has its own field of specialization.

=== Peru ===
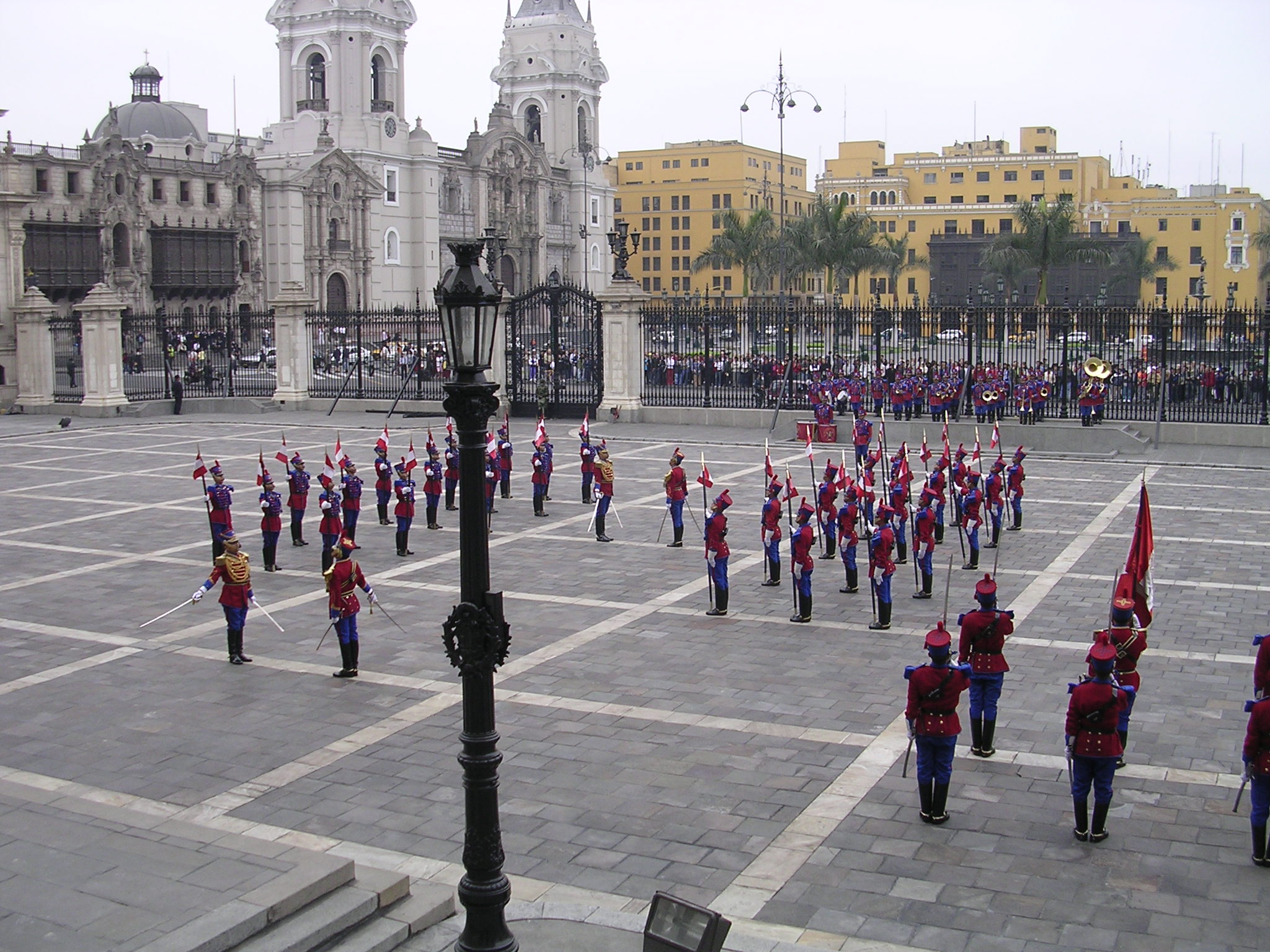
Commanding officers of two guard detachments meet during a formal guard mounting ceremony at Government Palace, Peru.

The Changing of the Guard is a major tourist attraction at the Government Palace. It is a daily event that takes place at noon. On the first and third Sundays of the month the Mariscal Domingo Nieto Cavalry Regiment Escort conducts a formal mounted Changing of the Guard ceremony in the presence of the President of Peru, while on other days, the Changing of the Guard is performed unmounted. Since 2007, participation in the ceremony has been opened to all of the Armed Forces and the National Police, represented by their historical and ceremonial honour guard units.

=== Poland ===
The changing of the guard by the 1st Guards Battalion Representative Honour Guard Regiment of the Polish Armed Forces takes place at the Tomb of the Unknown Soldier in Warsaw 24/7 for 365 days a year. The guard unit for the mounting is from each of the three honour guard companies that make up the battalion.

=== Portugal ===
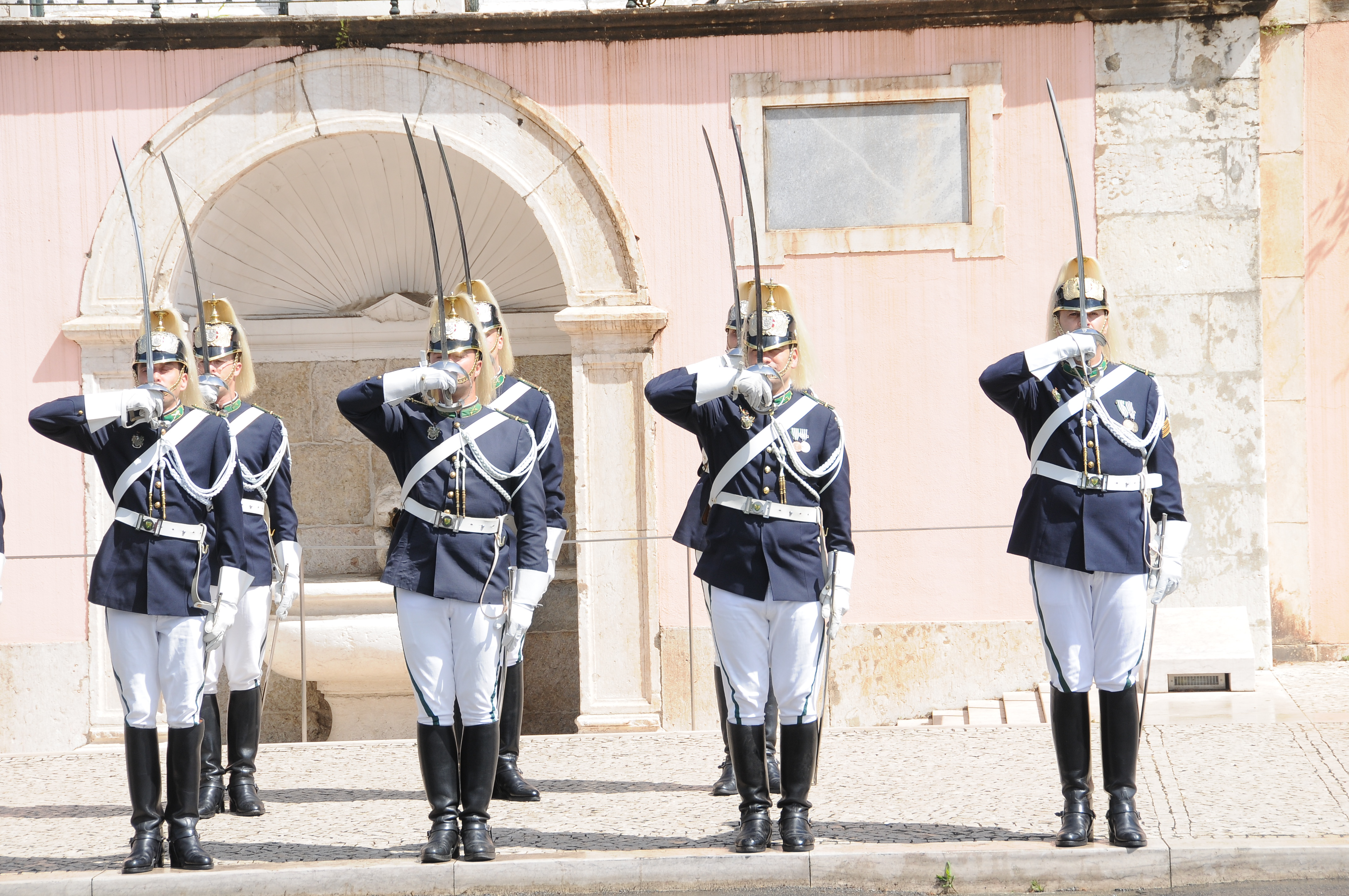
Portuguese National Republican Guardsmen during a guard mounting ceremony outside Belém Palace.

The National Republican Guard carries out a changing of the guard ceremony at the Belém Palace, official residence of the Portuguese President, on the third Sunday of each month at 11:00 am. The ceremony includes a performance by the cavalry musicians of the GNR's "Charanga a Cavalo", which claims to be the only mounted band in the world which performs at the gallop.

=== Romania ===
The Michael the Brave 30th Guards Brigade changes the guard every hour at the Tomb of the Unknown Soldier in the capital. In Alba Iulia, the guard is changed at noon every weekend at the Citadel Alba-Carolina. This particular guard unit is notable for its 18th-century uniform, derived from the Habsburg monarchy and complete with musket and wig.

=== Russia ===
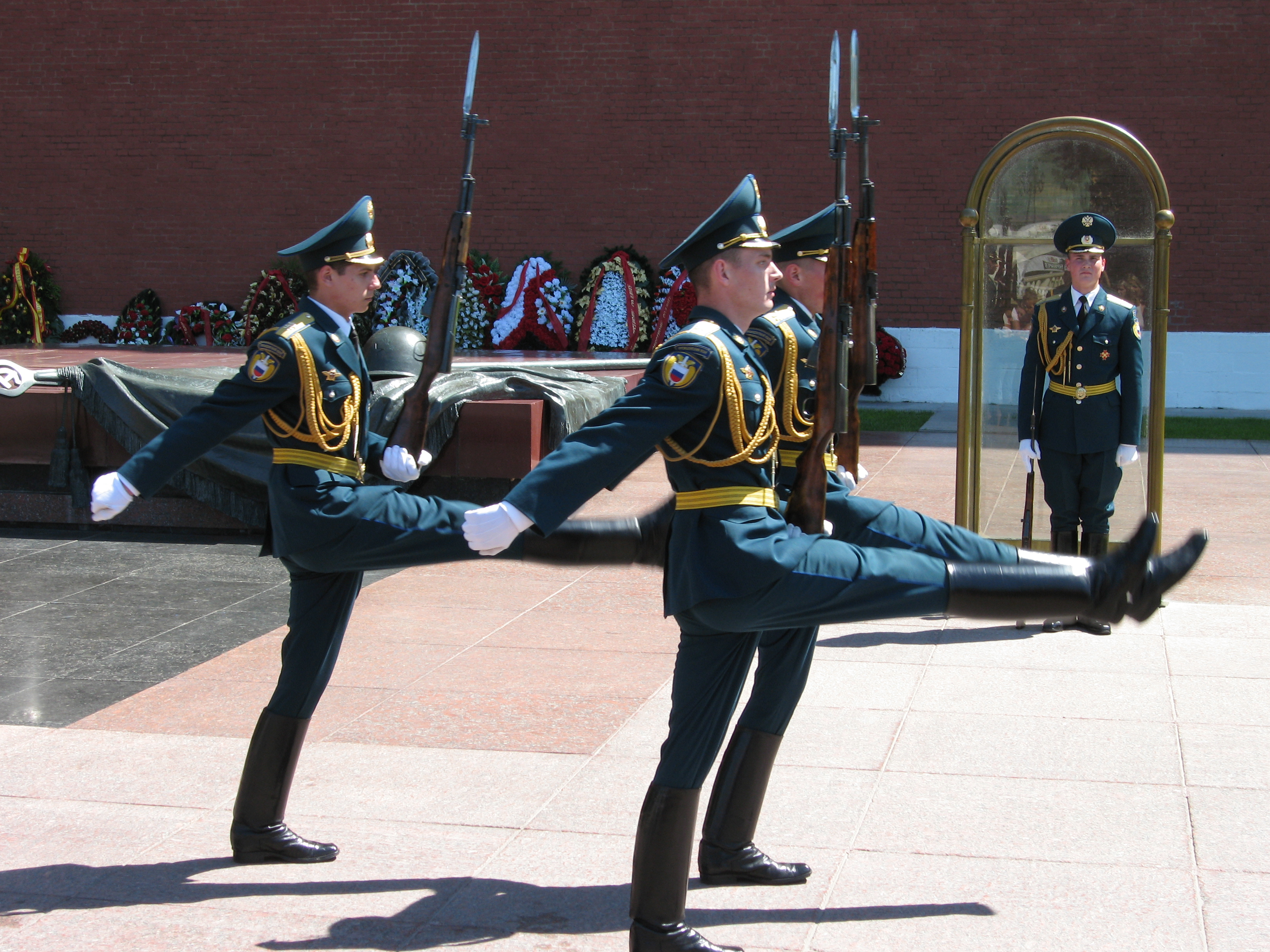
Changing the Guard ceremony performed by the Kremlin Regiment at the Russian Tomb of the Unknown Soldier.

The Kremlin Regiment (Kremlyovskiy polk) of the Federal Protective Service provides the guard at the Tomb of the Unknown soldier in Moscow. During the day the guard is changed every hour. During the Soviet period the ceremony (known in Russian as the Смена караула, Smena karaula) was carried out by what was then a KGB guard detachment at the Lenin Mausoleum. However, by decree of President of the Russian Federation Boris Yeltsin the guard has now been relocated to the Tomb of the Unknown Soldier in the Alexander Garden.

Starting in 2004 a Guard Mounting ceremony has been held by the Cavalry Squadron of the Kremlin Regiment on Cathedral Square every Sunday from March to October. Since April 2016, the guard changing ceremony was the first to be live-streamed online.

At the Mamayev Kurgan Memorial Complex in Volgograd, the 46th Separate Honour Guard Company mounts the guard from 9 am to 8 pm, with the changing of the guard being performed hourly in a special slow march goosestep.

=== San Marino ===
The Guardia di Rocca conduct a Changing the Guard ceremony at the Palazzo Pubblico from April to September every half-hour from 8:30am to 6:30pm.

=== Singapore ===
In Singapore, the ceremony is performed at the main entrance of the Istana, the official residence of the President of Singapore. Held on the first Sunday of each month, the ceremony begins in front of Orchard Point, a shopping centre at Orchard Road, where military policemen from the Silent Precision Drill Squad of the Singapore Armed Forces Military Police Command (SAFMPC) leads the contingent of new guards from the Law Enforcement and Ceremonial Company in a march down the road towards the Istana, with the Singapore Armed Forces Bands providing music and beats.

Upon arrival at the gates of the Istana, the actual change of guard ceremony takes place, after which the Silent Precision Drill Squad performs their precision drill routines with the accompaniment of music provided by the band. The old guards then marches off together with the band to Oldham Lane, where the entire procedure ends.

The COG was first performed by servicemen from the Guards formation before it was being handed over to the SAFMPC on 4 May 1980. The Silent Precision Drill Squad was added to the ceremony in 1987. The COG begins at 6:00pm. The new guards begin their march at around 5:45pm, and the old guards end their march by around 6:30pm.

=== South Korea ===
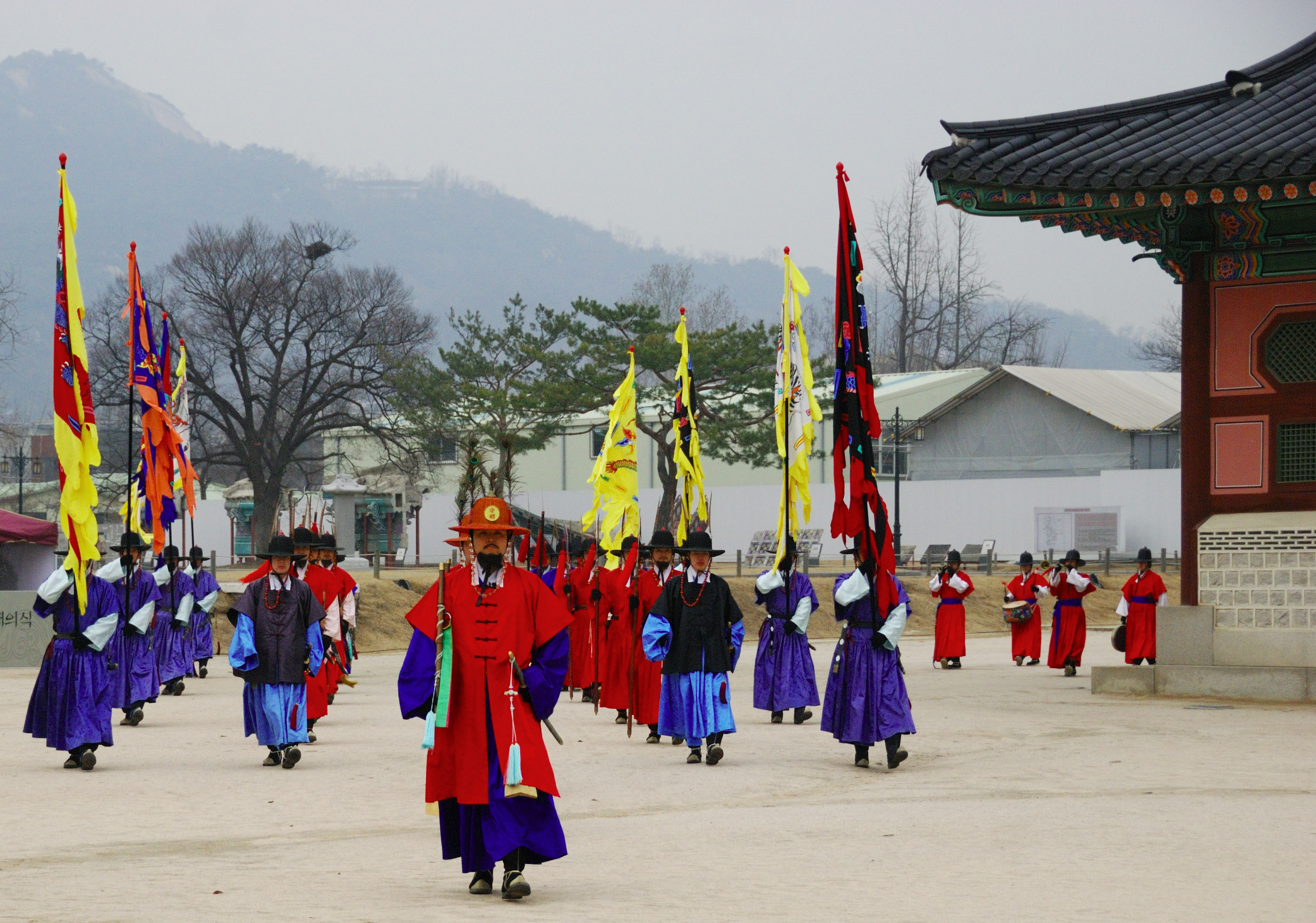
Traditional Guard Unit of the South Korean Army re-enact guard mounting ceremonies that were observed during the Joseon Dynasty.

In South Korea, re-enactments of Guard changing ceremonies are held daily except on Tuesdays, at Deoksugung palace and Gyeongbokgung palace. It is a re-enactment of a traditional Guard changing ceremony, which was observed during the Joseon Dynasty.

The unit providing the guard is from the Traditional Guard Unit of the 3rd Infantry Division, Republic of Korea Army.

=== Spain ===
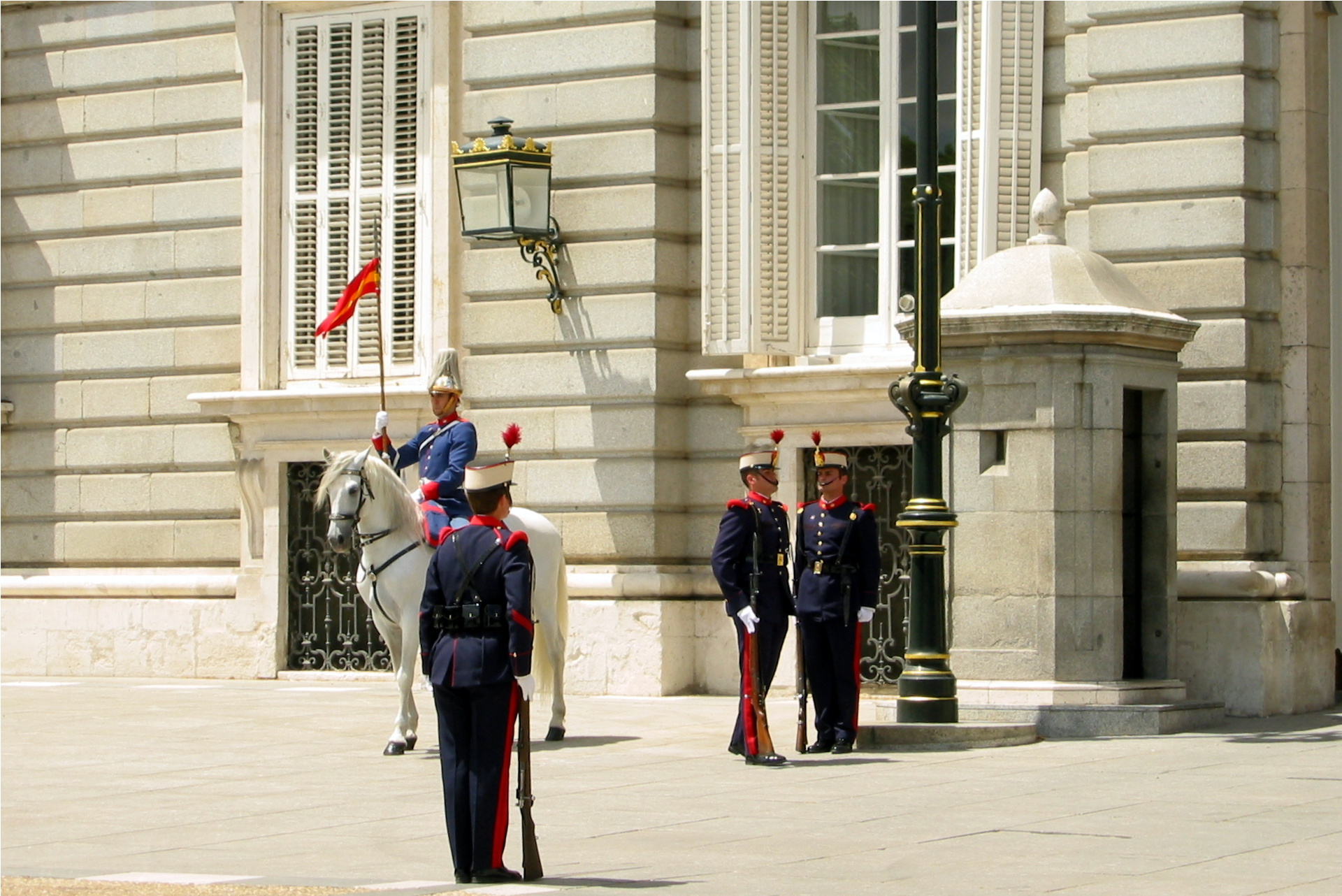
A Spanish Royal Guardsman in the process of being relieved by his replacement at the Royal Palace of Madrid.

In Spain there is a guard mounting ceremony at the Royal Palace of Madrid on the first Wednesday every month from 12 midday to 2:00 pm (except during July, August, and September), weather permitting, as long as it does not coincide with another official event. The unit mounting the guard is provided by the Spanish Royal Guard's Honours Group. The ceremony has taken place every the first Wednesday of every month since it was introduced on 23 November 1994, with the Royal House deciding in December 2007 to reformat the ceremony and open it to public viewing, similarly to the militaries of the United Kingdom or Denmark.

Aside from this, the 1st King's Immemorial Infantry Regiment of AHQ does Guard Mounting Ceremonies on weekdays at noon at the Buenavista Palace in Madrid, the headquarters of the Spanish Army, and is also open to the public. The unit providing the guard is the regiment's Honour Guard Battalion "Old Guard of Castille", accompanied by the Regimental Band and the Corps of Drums, and it is done per the military regulations of King Charles III and their respective drum and fife calls. The Honour Battalion's Fusilier and Grenadier companies wear the late 18th-century regulation uniforms and carry period muskets from that era, and the drill is from those same regulations mentioned above.

=== Sri Lanka ===
The Changing the Guard at the President's House occurs daily, conducted by the President's Ceremonial Guard Company of the Sri Lanka Corps of Military Police, while other services of the Sri Lankan Armed Forces perform occasional mounting duties.

=== Sweden ===
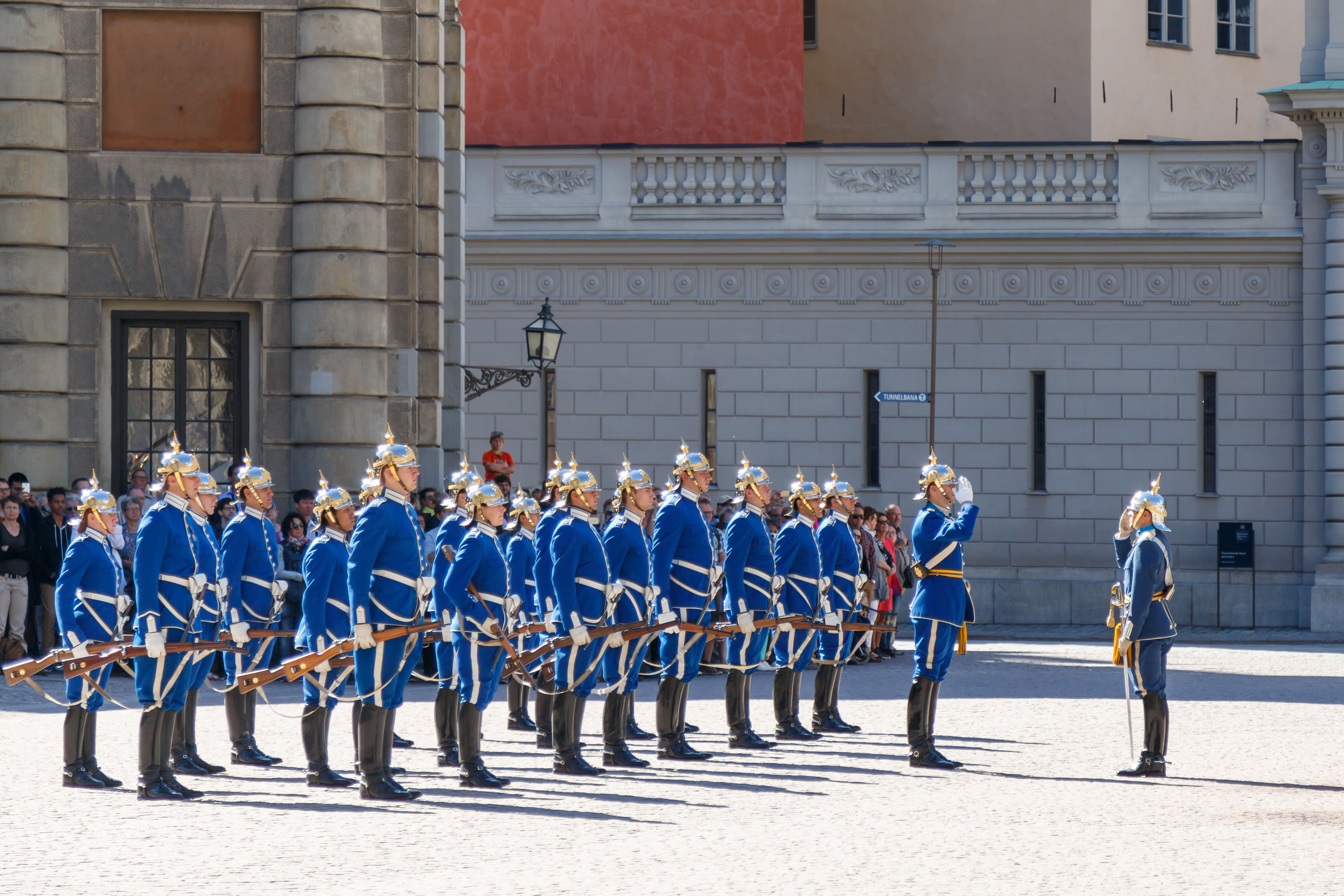
The Changing the Guard at Stockholm Palace is performed by the Swedish Royal Guards.

The Changing of the guard at Stockholm Palace, the official residence of the King and Queen of Sweden, occurs daily in its outer courtyard. The Swedish Royal Guard unit of the Life Guards Regiment provide the guard unit for most of the year, while other services of the Swedish Armed Forces perform occasional mounting duties as may be requested.

=== Taiwan (Republic of China) ===
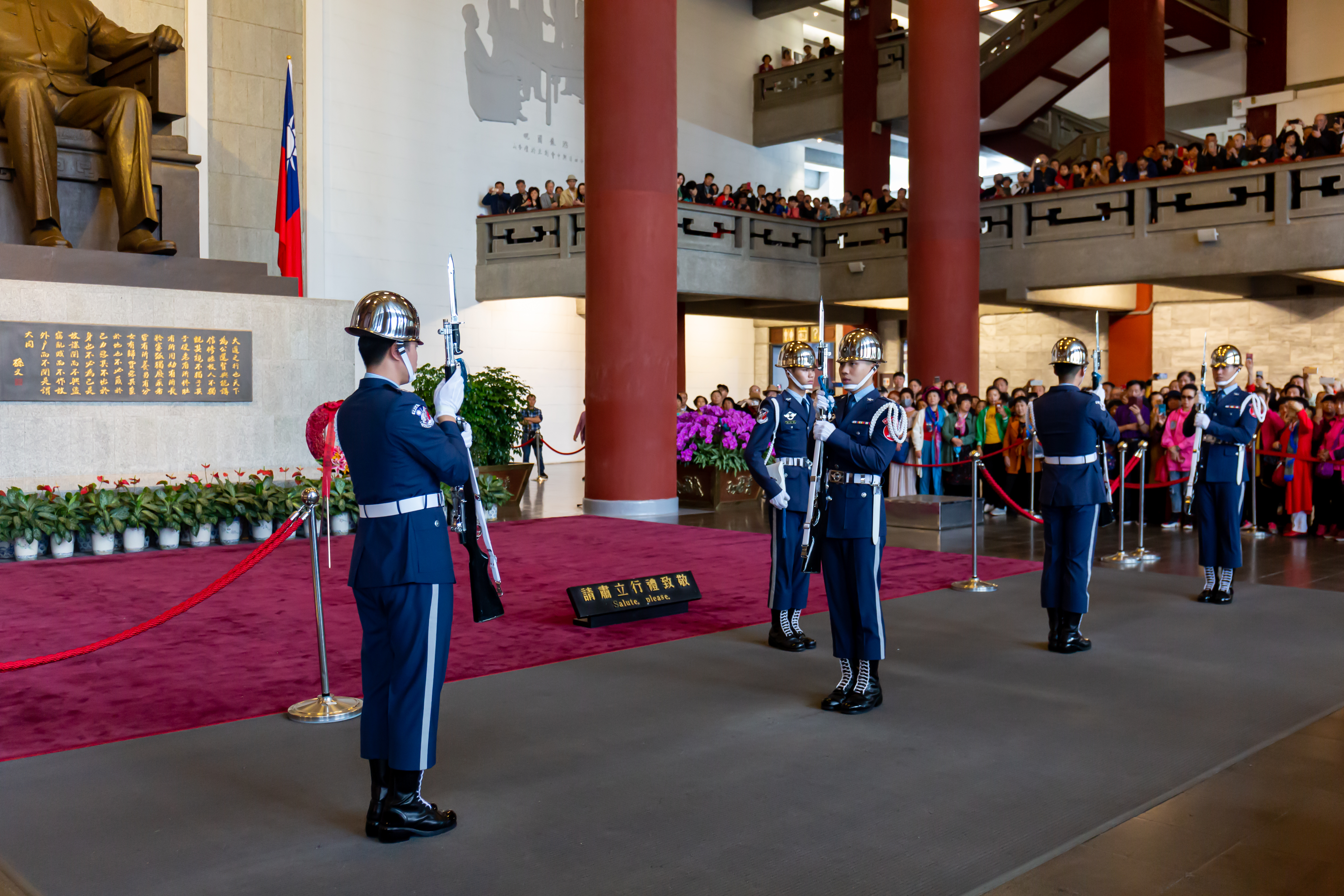
Changing of the guard at Sun Yat-sen Memorial Hall.

In the Republic of China (Taiwan), the changing of the guard ceremony is conducted at three locations in Taipei, namely the National Chiang Kai-shek Memorial Hall, the Sun Yat-sen Memorial Hall, and the National Martyrs' Shrine, where the ceremonial guards are rotated by the hour during the opening hours of the three memorials. Servicemen from the honour guard detachments of the Republic of China Armed Forces provide the guard details in these locations alternating each day.

The changing of the guard ceremony at the National Chiang Kai-shek Memorial Hall used to be held inside the memorial hall, where the guards would stand guard the statue of Chiang in the hall. The guard duty for the statue was abolished in July 2024 following ongoing transitional justice efforts to end the veneration of authoritarianism and cult of personality around Chiang. Since then, the changing of the guard ceremony and the silent drill have been held outdoors. The guard personnel remained on duty at the memorial hall, serving in site security duties.

=== Thailand ===
Soldiers marching after their Changing of the Guard at the Grand Palace, Bangkok.

A Changing of the Guard ceremony takes place at Bangkok's Grand Palace every day with soldiers from the Royal Security Command and other King's Guard units. Unlike in other countries the duty guard wears pith helmets without plumes for the ceremony.

=== Turkey ===
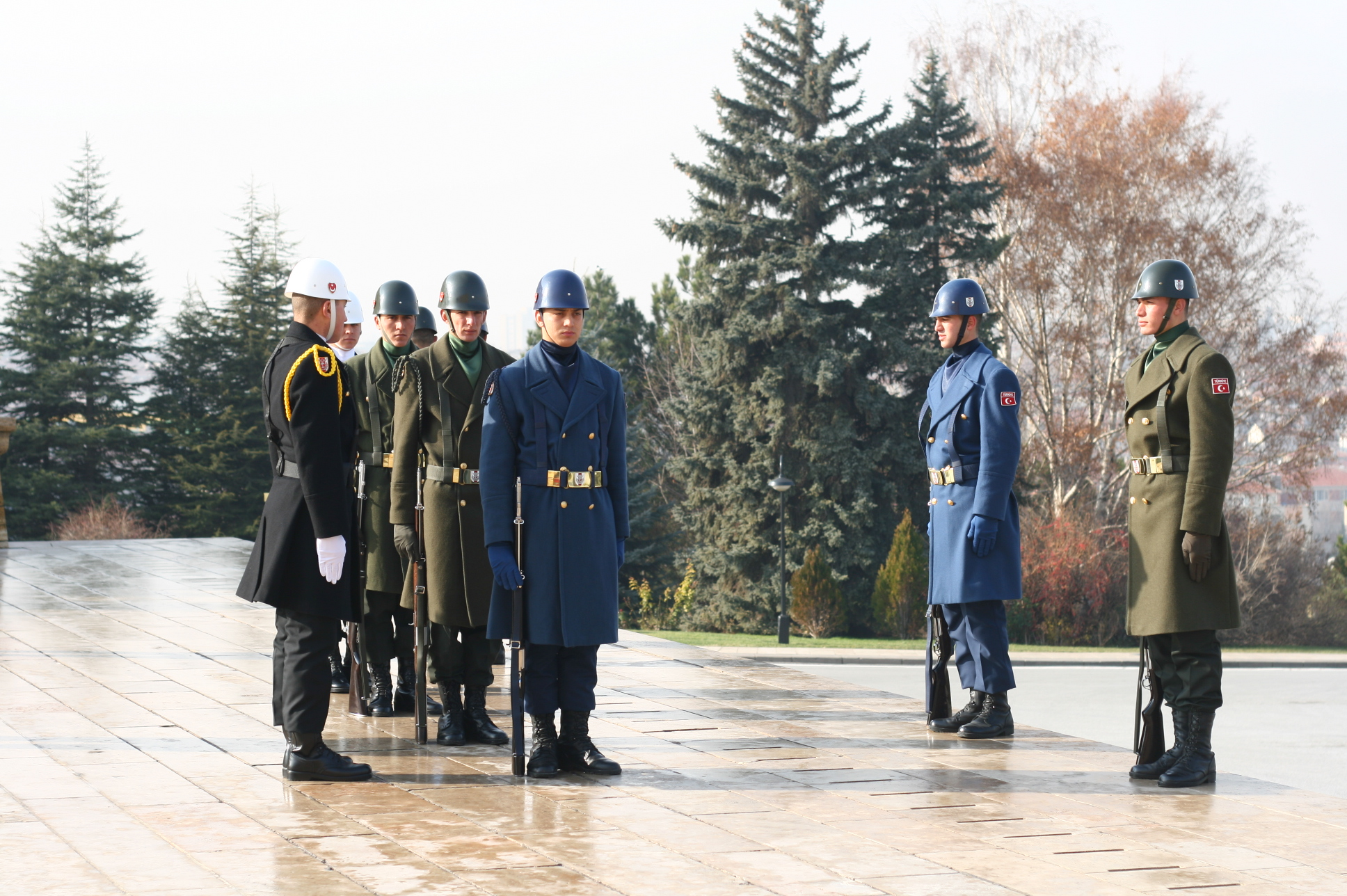
Changing of the guard at Anıtkabir.

A Changing of the Guard ceremony takes place at Anıtkabir in Ankara. Anıtkabir contains the tomb of Mustafa Kemal Atatürk, the founder of modern Turkey.

=== Turkmenistan ===
A Changing of the Guard ceremony is conducted by the Independent Honor Guard Battalion of the Ministry of Defence of Turkmenistan based out of Ashgabat. It takes place at the Türkmenbaşy Ruhy Mosque, National Museum of Turkmenistan and the Independence Monument in Ashgabat and involves 6 guardsmen and a relief commander.

=== Ukraine ===
On a daily basis, soldiers of the Special Honor Guard Battalion of the National Guard of Ukraine take part in the ceremonial of the guard changing and flag raising ceremony near the Verkhovna Rada building on the Constitution Square. Honor guards from the battalion are posted at the building from 10:00 am to 6:00 pm on weekends and holidays. In the winter, the guard will change every hour; and in the summer; every two hours. On 1 March 2020, the first ceremony was held to commemorate this new tradition. They are posted at the side of the building where four National Guard officers were killed on 31 August 2015.

=== United Kingdom ===
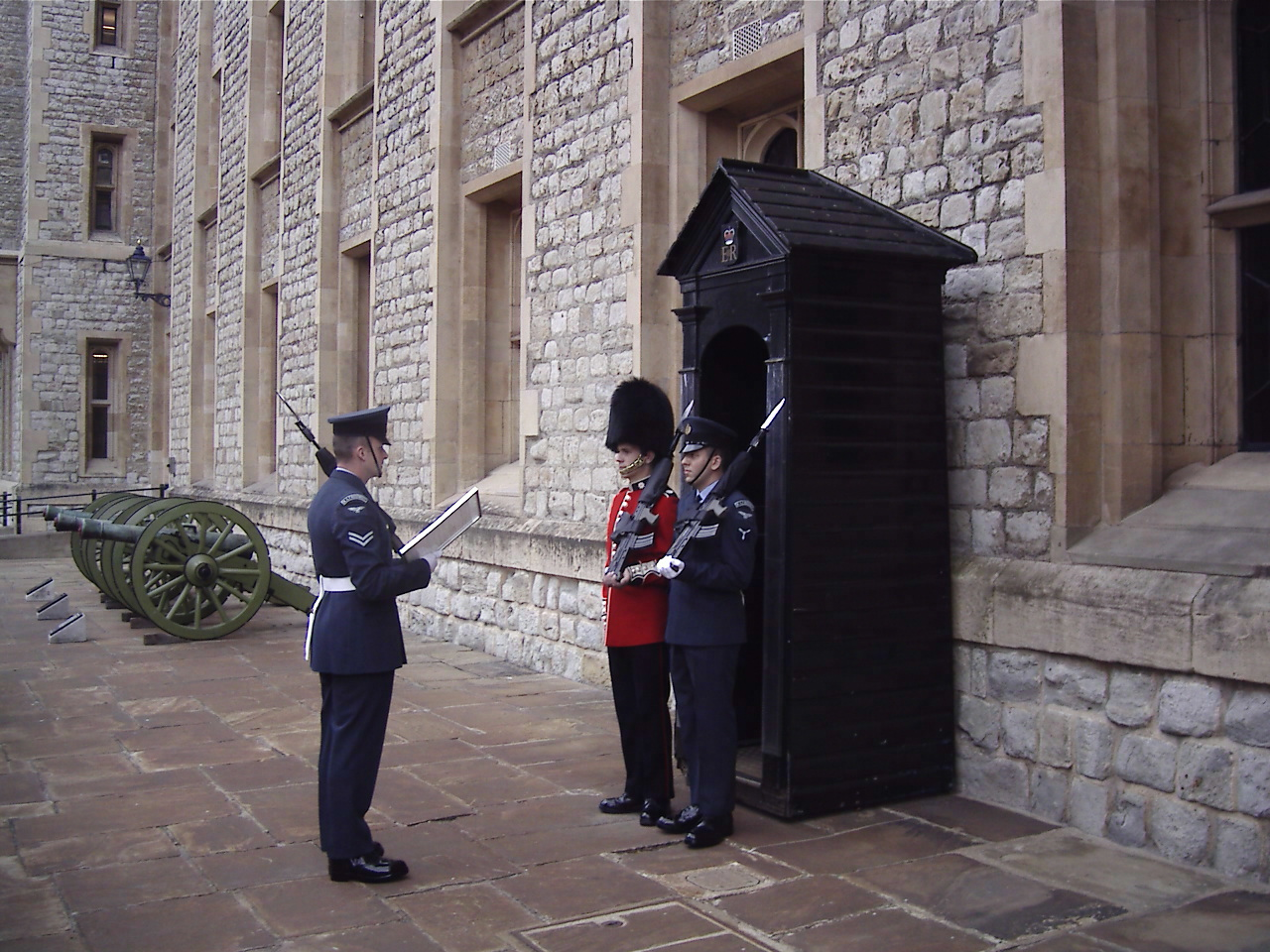
A sentry from the King's Colour Squadron of the Royal Air Force prepares to relieve a Coldstream Guardsman at the Tower of London.

The King's Guard (called Queen's Guard when the reigning monarch is female) are the names given to the fully operational infantry and cavalry contingents of soldiers charged with guarding royal residences in the London District and Edinburgh. As a result, Guards are mounted at Buckingham Palace, St James's Palace, the Tower of London, Windsor Castle and the Palace of Holyroodhouse. The British Army's Household Division, which consists of the Foot Guards and the Household Cavalry are normally responsible for mounting the King's Guard.

The original King's Guard predating the English Restoration consisted of the Troops of Horse Guards and Foot Guards, which have since evolved and from the reign of King Charles II have been responsible for guarding the Sovereign's palaces. The ceremony originally took place at the Palace of Whitehall until 1689, when it was moved to St James's Palace. After Queen Victoria moved into Buckingham Palace in 1837, The Queen's Guard remained at St James's Palace, while a detachment was moved to the new residence.

Outside the Foot Guards, the King's Colour Squadron of the RAF, the Brigade of Gurkhas and the Royal Marines also periodically mount the guard. In November 2017, the Royal Navy mounted the guard for the first time since its establishment with a company-sized detachment formed of volunteers from 45 ships and shore establishments. for two weeks, the first time that the Royal Navy had formed the Queen's Guard in its own right (rather than being represented by the Royal Marines). The first foreign troops to mount a King or Queen's Guard were members of the 117th (Eastern Townships) Battalion of the CEF in 1916, with Canada having since mounted the most guards out of any foreign country since then. In 2000, the Australian Federation Guard performed public duties in London while being led by the first ever female guard commander in history. In 2008, the 1st Battalion, Royal Malay Regiment became the first regiment whose its country does not have the British Sovereign as its head of state to mount the guard.

=== United States ===
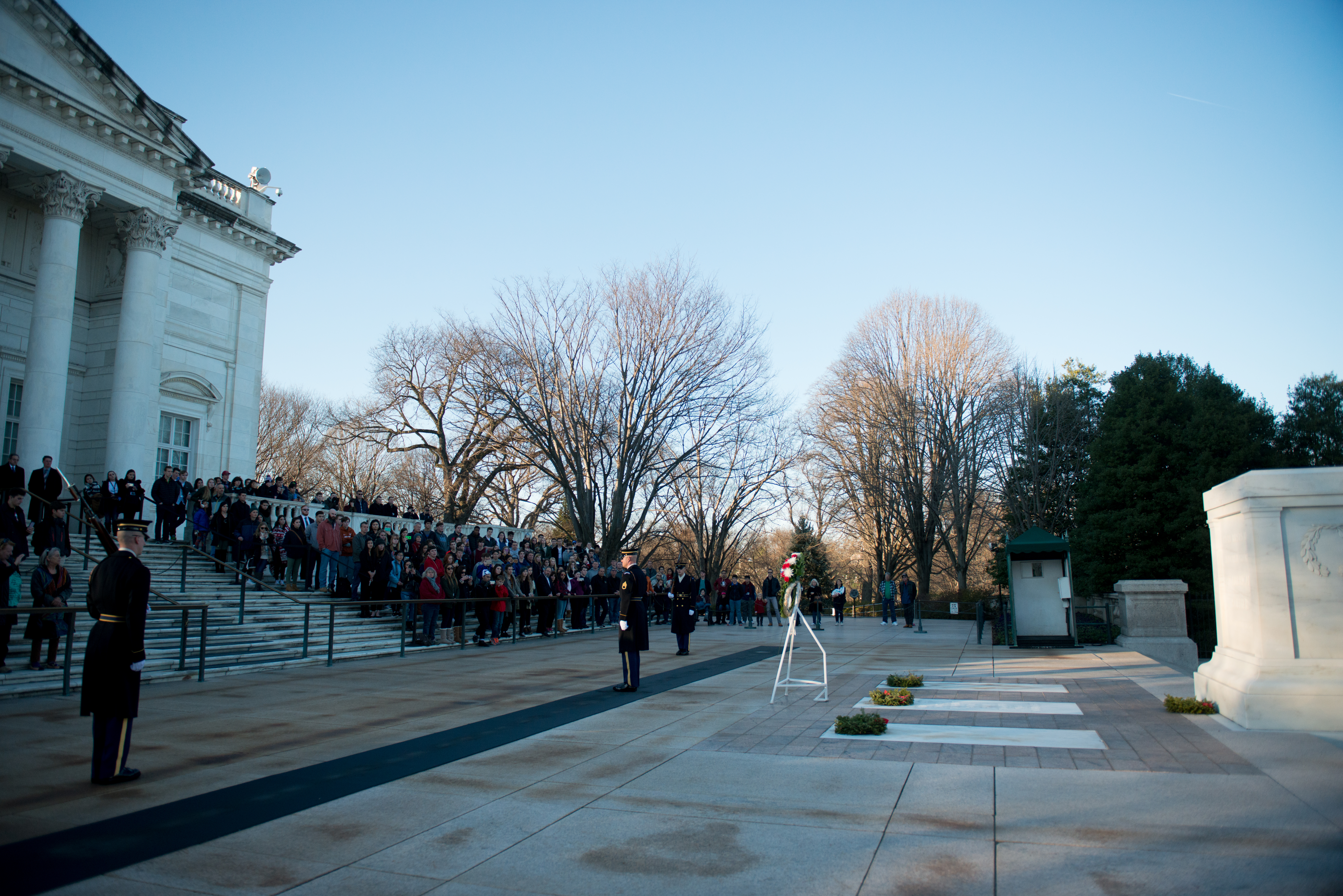
In the United States, the Changing of the Guard ceremony takes place at the Tomb of the Unknown Soldier, which has a permanent guard.

A permanent guard is mounted at the Tomb of the Unknown Soldier at Arlington National Cemetery in Arlington, Virginia, near Washington, D.C. This is performed by a single member of the 3rd U.S. Infantry Regiment. There is a meticulous routine which the Tomb Guard follows during a 63 feet (19.2 m) march when watching over the Tomb. The Guard:

1. Marches 21 steps down the black mat behind the Tomb.
2. Turns, faces east for 21 seconds.
3. Turns and faces north for 21 seconds.
4. Takes 21 steps down the mat.
5. Repeats the routine until the soldier is relieved of duty at the Changing of the Guard.

After each turn, the Guard executes a sharp "shoulder-arms" movement to place their M14 rifle on the shoulder closest to the visitors to signify that the Guard stands between the Tomb and any possible threat. Twenty-one was chosen because it symbolizes the highest military honor that can be bestowed—the 21-gun salute.

Each turn the guard makes is precise and is instantly followed by a loud click of the heels as he snaps them together. A guard has been on duty at the site continuously, 24 hours a day, 7 days a week, since July 2, 1937. The watch has been maintained even in cases of inclement weather or terrorist attack.

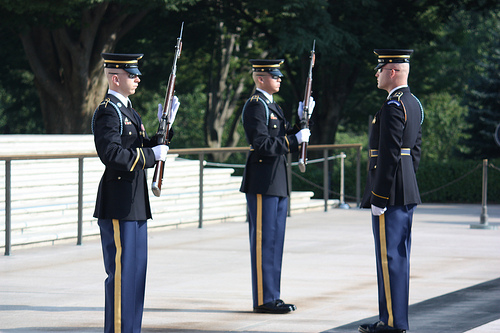
Guard changes are conducted in accordance to the Army's regulation, requiring a relief commander, and the oncoming guard in order for the guard change to take place.

During the day in summer months from April 1 to September 30, the guard is changed every half-hour. During the winter months, from October 1 to March 31, the guard is changed every hour. After the cemetery closes to the public (7 p.m. to 8 a.m. April through September, and 5 p.m. to 8 a.m. October through March), the guard is changed every 2 hours. The ceremony can be witnessed by the public whenever Arlington National Cemetery is open.

The guard change is very symbolic, but also conducted in accordance with Army regulations. The relief commander or assistant relief commander, along with the oncoming guard, are both required for a guard change to take place. The relief commander orders the guard being relieved to "pass on your orders" to the oncoming guard. The guard being relieved will say to the oncoming guard, "Post and orders, remain as directed." The oncoming guard's response is always, "Orders acknowledged." During changes when the public is witnessing the ceremony, the commander will inform the public that the ceremony is about to take place and that those in attendance should remain "silent and standing" throughout the entire event.

While the guards are all members of the United States Army, the soldier "walking the mat" does not wear his or her rank insignia, so as not to outrank the Unknowns, whatever their ranks may have been. Non-commissioned officers (usually the Relief Commander and Assistant Relief Commanders) do wear the insignia of their rank when changing the guard only. They have a separate uniform (without rank) that is worn when they actually guard the Unknowns or are "Posted".

The tomb guards have often been replicated by other organizations all over the country. Professional units such as the Chicago Police Department (CPD) Honor Guard and the Tulsa Civil Air Patrol have a tradition of mounting a ceremonial guard similar to the tomb guards in Arlington. The Humble High School JROTC program has since 2007 reenacted the changing of the guard during its Veteran's Day ceremony with cadets enrolled.

=== Vietnam ===
The Changing of the Guards in Hanoi, Vietnam takes place at the Ho Chi Minh Mausoleum which is guarded by the special guard of honor battalion of the Ministry of Defense of Vietnam. It is one of two such formations in the People's Army of Vietnam. The mausoleum contains the preserved body of Ho Chi Minh and is at the north end of Hanoi's Ba Đình Square, exactly on the spot where he read the Proclamation of Independence of the Democratic Republic of Vietnam on September 2, 1945. Unlike its Chinese counterpart, guard of honour battalion's area of responsibility (AOR) is limited to Hanoi, particularly to the area around Ba Đình Square. The battalion is a public duties unit. Personnel assigned to the guard wear a white full-dress uniform with a peaked cap and gold belt buckle.
