= Escuadrilla de Bandas =

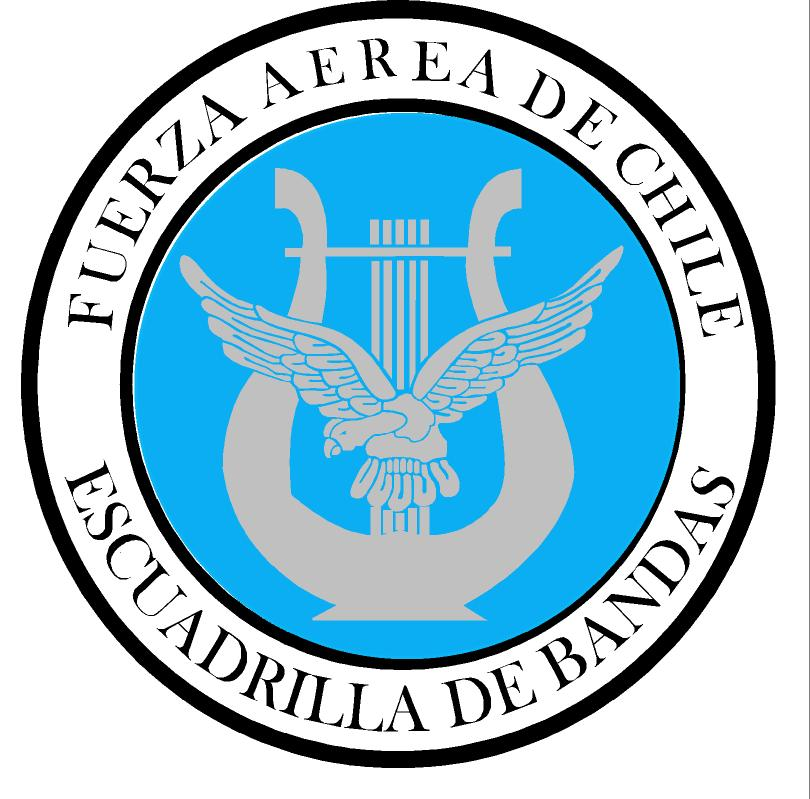
The band logo

The Escuadrilla de Bandas (Spanish: Band Squadron) also known as the Chilean Air Force Band (Spanish: Banda de la Fuerza Aérea de Chile) is a musical unit of the Chilean Air Force that brings together the military musicians of the Institution and that together with the Halcones, the Blue Berets and the Glider Squadron. They make up the Group of Presentations of the Chilean Air Force.

== History ==
The band service was created on 16 June 1934, in the then "El Bosque" Anti-Aircraft Artillery Group, just four years after the creation of the National Air Force. The management of the squadron was entrusted to Commander Osvaldo Puccio Guzmán. The band was founded with only 16 musicians and its first director was First Sergeant Enrique Pacheco García, who later held the position of Captain of the band service. Apart from aeronautical activities, there was also the task of organizing a concert band, which after prolonged efforts by the end of 1934, based on some musicians from the Anti-Aircraft Artillery Group became part of the first "Orfeón de la Fuerza Aerea Nacional". The Orfeón premiered publicly in the kiosk of the Plaza de Armas in Santiago on 19 January 1935. In July of the 1961, seeing the institution increase the activities of its military bands, it was decided to create bands serving the Air Force NCO School and the Air Force School. These two bands now serve as the service's official ceremonial bands during national events.

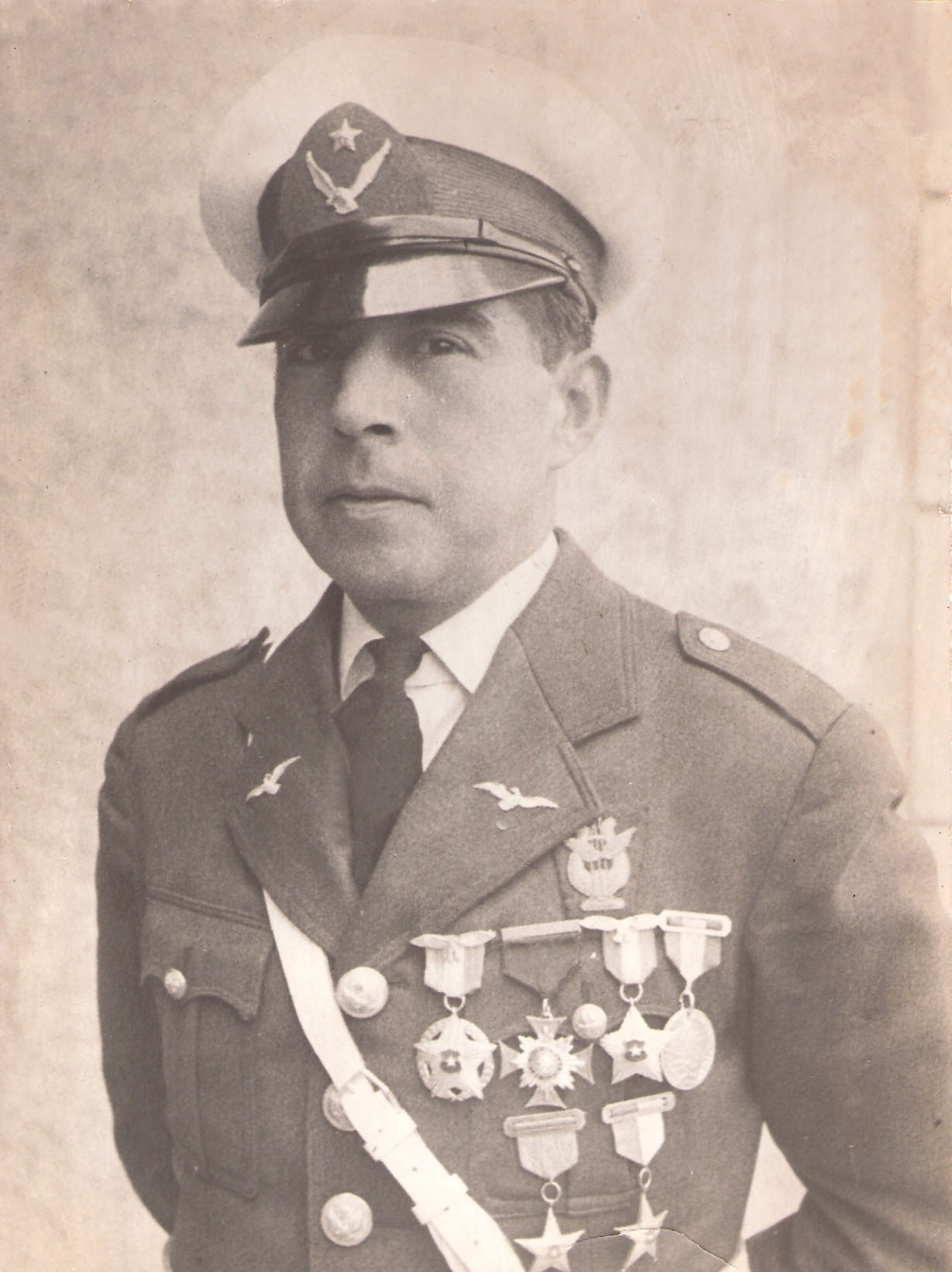
First Sergeant Enrique Pacheco García.

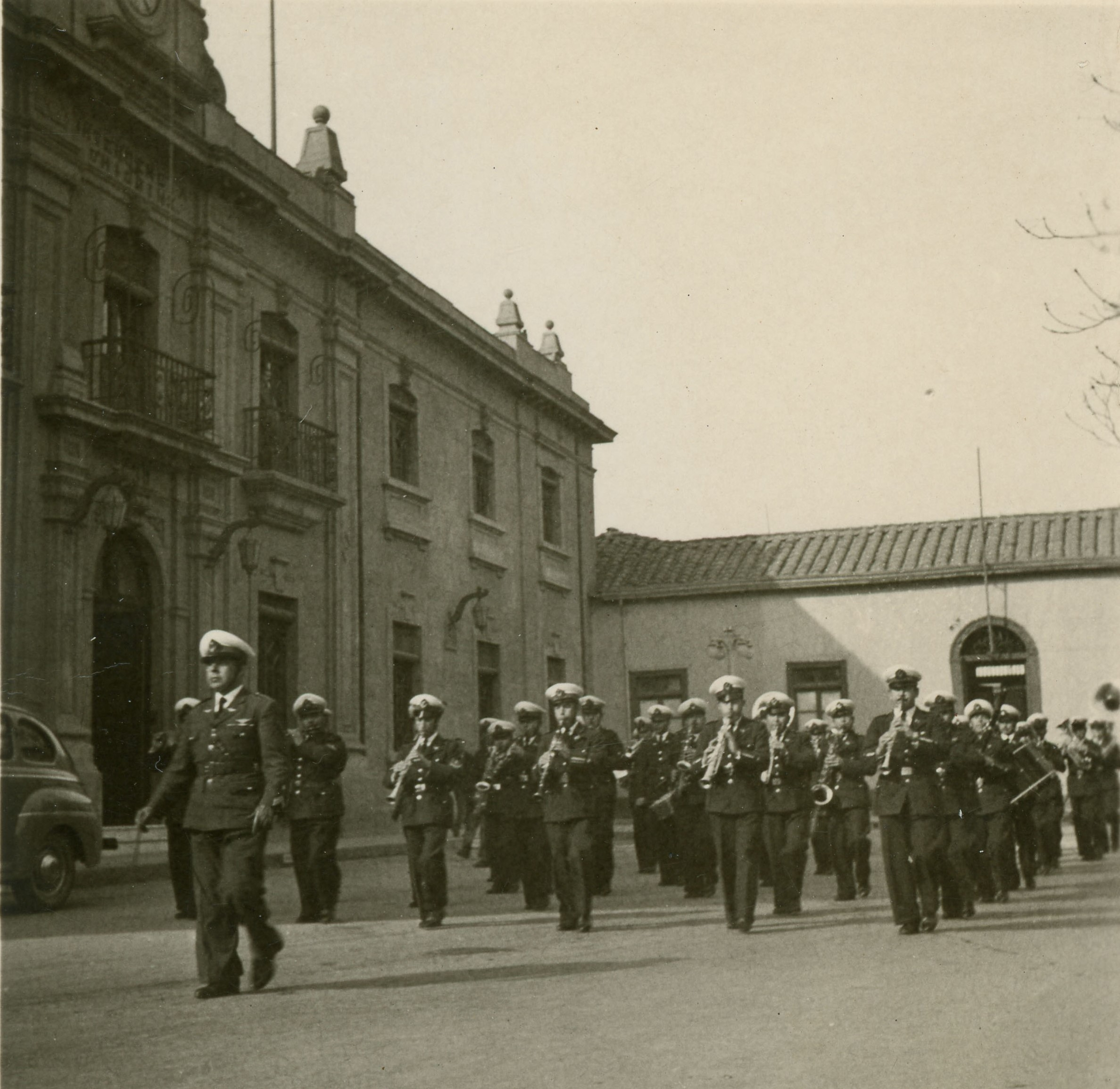
The band marching at the Plaza de los Héroes.

The Orfeón now took the name of "Concert Band of the Chilean Air Force" in the early 70s. In 1979, Commander-in-Chief of the Air Force, General Fernando Matthei, ordered the hiring of the musical director of a German police band, Lieutenant Colonel Arthur Max Rosin, in order to reorganize and turn this unit into a cultural outreach unit of the highest level in the Armed Forces. The Concert Band changed its name to "Chilean Air Force Symphonic Band" as a result. Today, it serves as the service's official concert band.

== Organization and activities ==
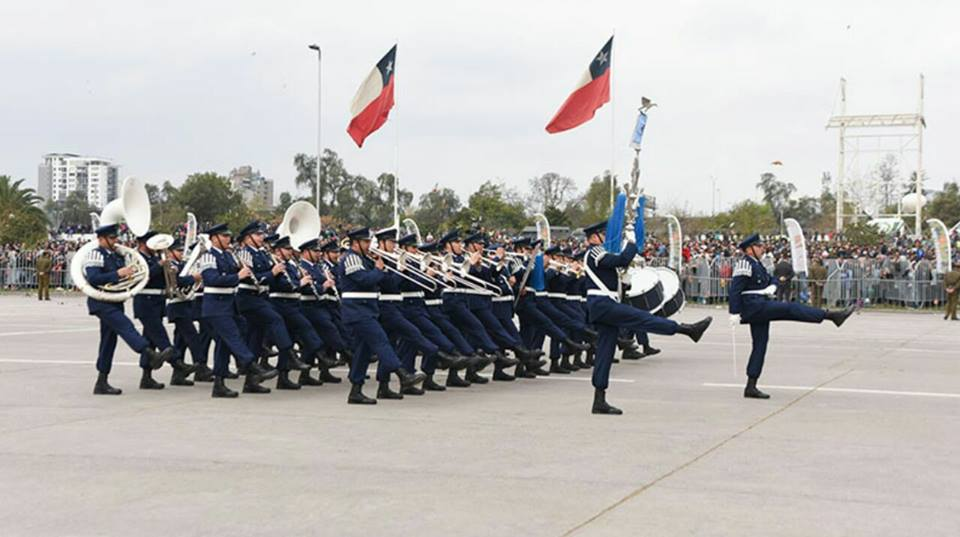
The band at the Great Military Parade of Chile.

The band seeks to show characteristics of professionalism that its personnel have in other areas, which is not strictly linked to defense. The Band Squadron currently consists of 60 musicians. The Big Band was established in 2006. The band has been present at the opening of the Frutillar Musical Weeks since 1982. The band had performed at a military tattoo organized by the government in honor of the APEC Chile 2019 summit that was later cancelled due to the ongoing protests at the time. On its 86th anniversary in 2020, the United States Air Force Band of the West made a Facebook video congratulating the band, referring it as a "valuable cultural asset for the Chilean people".

== Directors ==
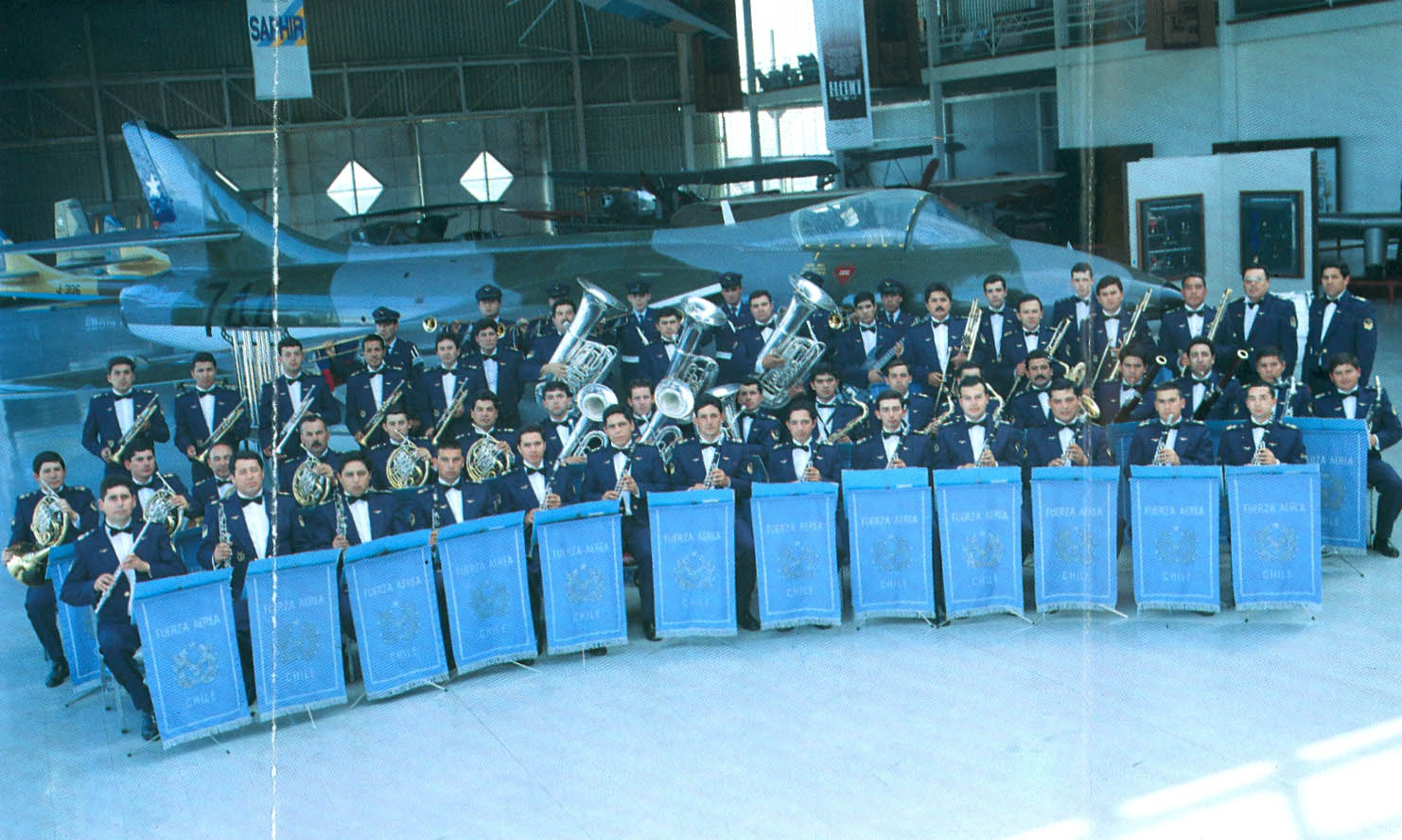
The band in July 2019.

- Captain Miguel Quinteros (1950 – 1952)
- Squadron Commander Tito Lederman Astudillo (1952 – 1953)
- Squadron Commander Abelardo Ruiz Diaz (1954 – 1956)
- Captain Alberto Neira Ladrón de Guevara (1957 – 1968)
- NCO Luis Lobos Valenzuela (2003 – 2004)
- Don Fabrizzio de Negri Murillo (Since 2004)

== See also ==
- United States Air Force Band
- Royal Canadian Air Force Band
