= Defense industry of Albania =

The Defense industry of Albania is going through a significant transformation with the aim of modernizing its capacities, and at the same time reducing the need for imports. A key project is the re-functionalization of old weapons production plants, which will enable the production of ammunition for Ukraine as part of the support for the country during the crisis. In addition, weapons and ammunition will also be produced for its own needs in various sectors and for the Albanian army or for export.

The government plans to create a state-owned company called "KAYO (Albania)". This initiative aims to revive the military industry and is supported by an initial investment of 3 million euros.

Albania also wants to strengthen cooperation with international partners to advance its defense strategies, positioning itself as an active player in the field of global security. These developments are important for increasing the independence and stability of the country's armed forces.

== History ==
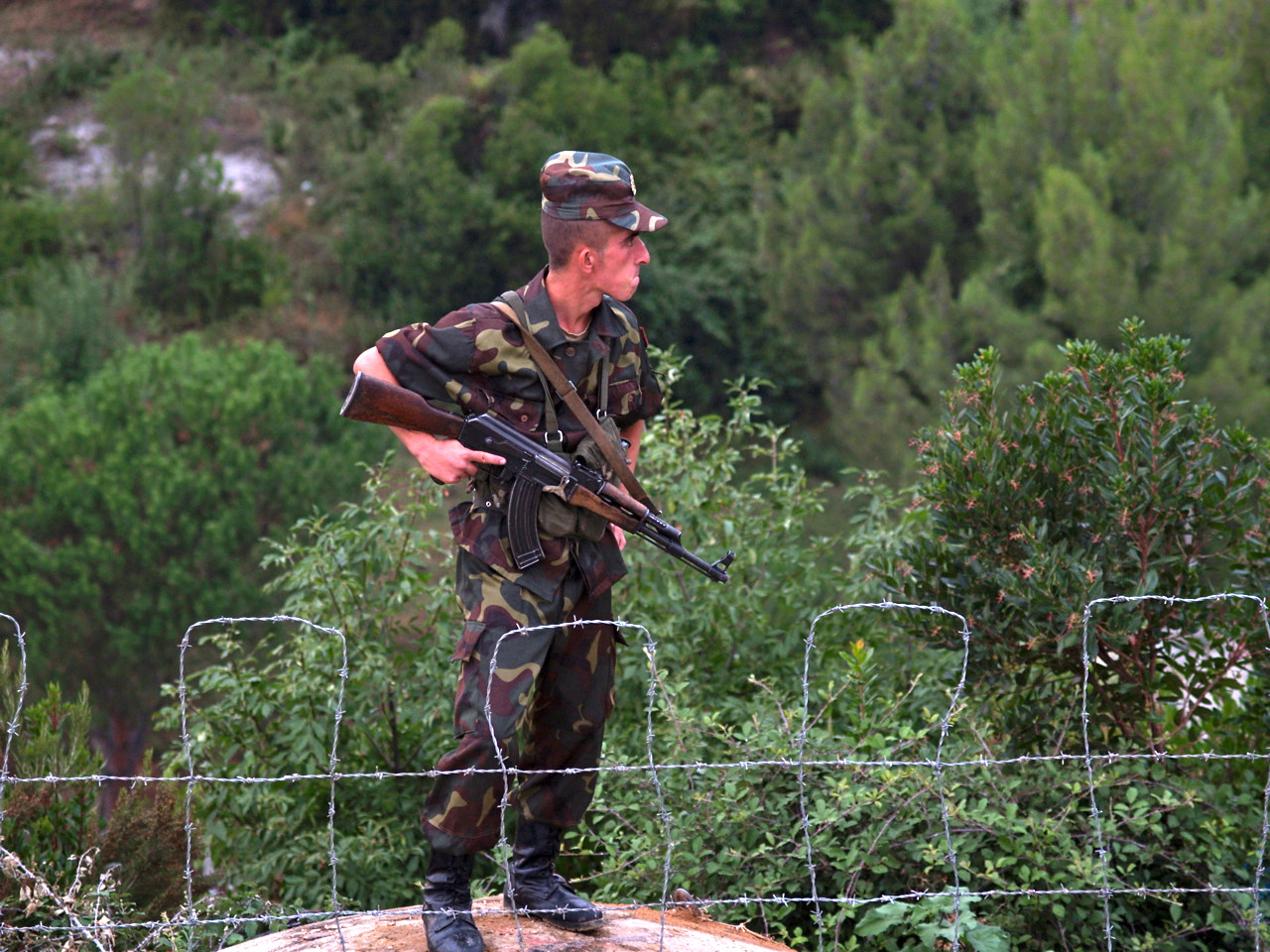
Albanian soldier with an Ash-78

During the communist era, Albania produced weapons and ammunition in numerous factories. One of the products produced in Albania was the ASH-78 (Automatiku Shqiptar 78), which was an Albanian automatic rifle developed in the 1970s as a licensed variant of the Chinese Type 56, which itself was based on the Soviet AKM. Chambered in 7.62×39mm, the ASH-78 was produced at the Gramsh factory in Albania and was used by the Albanian People's Army and later by the Albanian Armed Forces.

== Manufacturers ==
The Albanian defense industry comprises the state-owned conglomerate KAYO, private domestic firms, and international joint ventures.

=== State-owned enterprises ===
- KAYO: The central state-owned entity managing the following facilities:
  - Mjekës Explosives Plant: Produces TNT, RDX, propellants, and artillery charges.
  - Poliçan Mechanical Plant: Manufactures ammunition (5.56×45mm NATO, 7.62×39mm, 7.62×51mm NATO, 9×19mm Parabellum), mortar rounds (60mm, 82mm, 120mm), and hand grenades.
  - Gramsh Mechanical Plant: Assembles assault rifles (AKM variants) and manufactures metal weapon components.
  - Rubik Facility: Joint venture site with Elbit Systems producing unmanned combat aerial vehicles (UCAVs), howitzers, and light weapons.
  - Shkozë Facility: Assembles armored vehicles and produces tactical gear.

=== Private domestic manufacturers ===
- Timak Defence: Manufacturer of the Shota Mine-Resistant Ambush Protected (MRAP) vehicle.
  - SHOTA MRAP
  - Heavy Duty personnel carriers
  - Tactical vehicles
  - C-UAS Vehicles

- MKD (Myslym Keta Defence): Produces small and medium-caliber ammunition.
  - 9 mm caliber
  - 5.56 mm NATO caliber
  - 7.62 mm caliber
  - 12.7 mm NATO caliber

- Guna Tactical: is focused on the design, production and distribution of military uniforms and accessories.

=== International joint ventures ===
- Fincantieri Albania (51% Fincantieri, 49% KAYO): Based at Pashaliman Naval Base.
  - Products: Offshore Patrol Vessels (OPVs) up to 80 meters and naval maintenance services.
- Elbit Systems Albania: Operates in Rubik.
  - Products: Assembly of loitering munitions, unmanned aerial vehicles (UAVs), and heavy artillery systems.

== The first Albanian military armored car ==
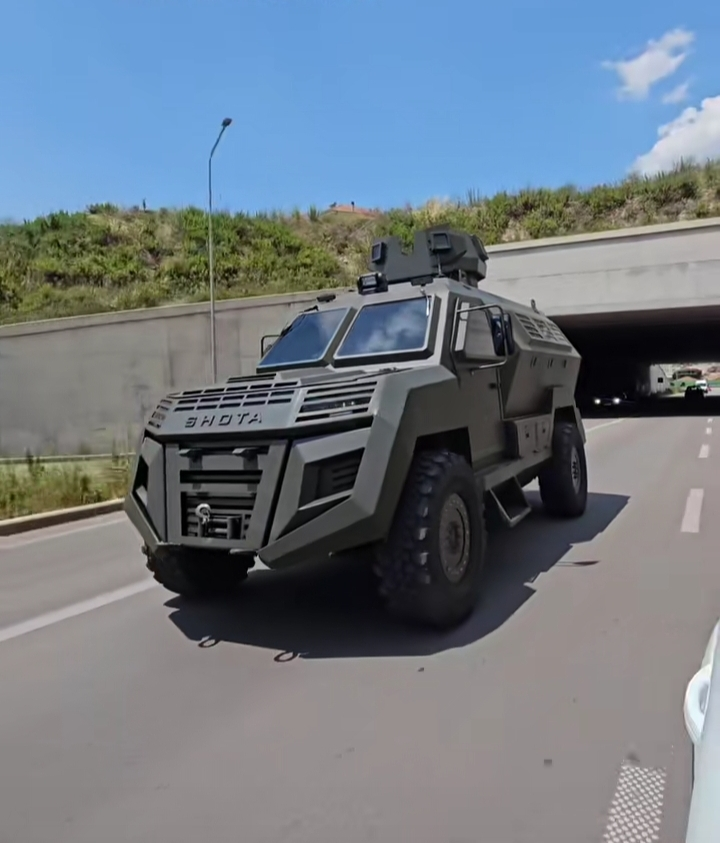
Timak Shota.

At the international fair EUROSATORY held in Paris, the first prototype of the albanian military vehicle appeared “Shota MRAP”. Which is the first armored military vehicle produced in Albania. The armored vehicle is a mine-resistant, ambush-protected vehicle manufactured by TIMAK in Albania. The vehicle is designed for maximum security in high-risk environments, featuring a V-shaped chassis with a hull to avoid explosions and advanced armor for ballistic protection. Equipped with the most advanced communication and navigation systems, it ensures operational efficiency and coordination in combat zones.

== See also ==
- Ministry of Defence (Albania)
- Defense industry of Turkey
