= Military history of Barbados =

The military history of Barbados comprises hundreds of years of military activity on the island of Barbados, as well as international military and peacekeeping operations in which Barbadians took part.

== Colonial history ==
Throughout the colonial history of Barbados, Britain routinely stationed large segments of its West India regimental troops on the island of Barbados. The troops acted principally as a force to secure the island against any invasion by other European powers as well as to help protect other neighbouring British territories in the Eastern Caribbean from invasion. Militia numbers were substantially increased after a series of slave revolts in the West Indies—including Barbados—during the first quarter of the 19th century. So successful were British colonial troop deployments to Barbados, it has been said that Barbados is the only country in the Caribbean region never to have changed hands since the British first landed and established the city of Jamestown (around the first quarter century of the 17th century) until independence.

=== World War II ===
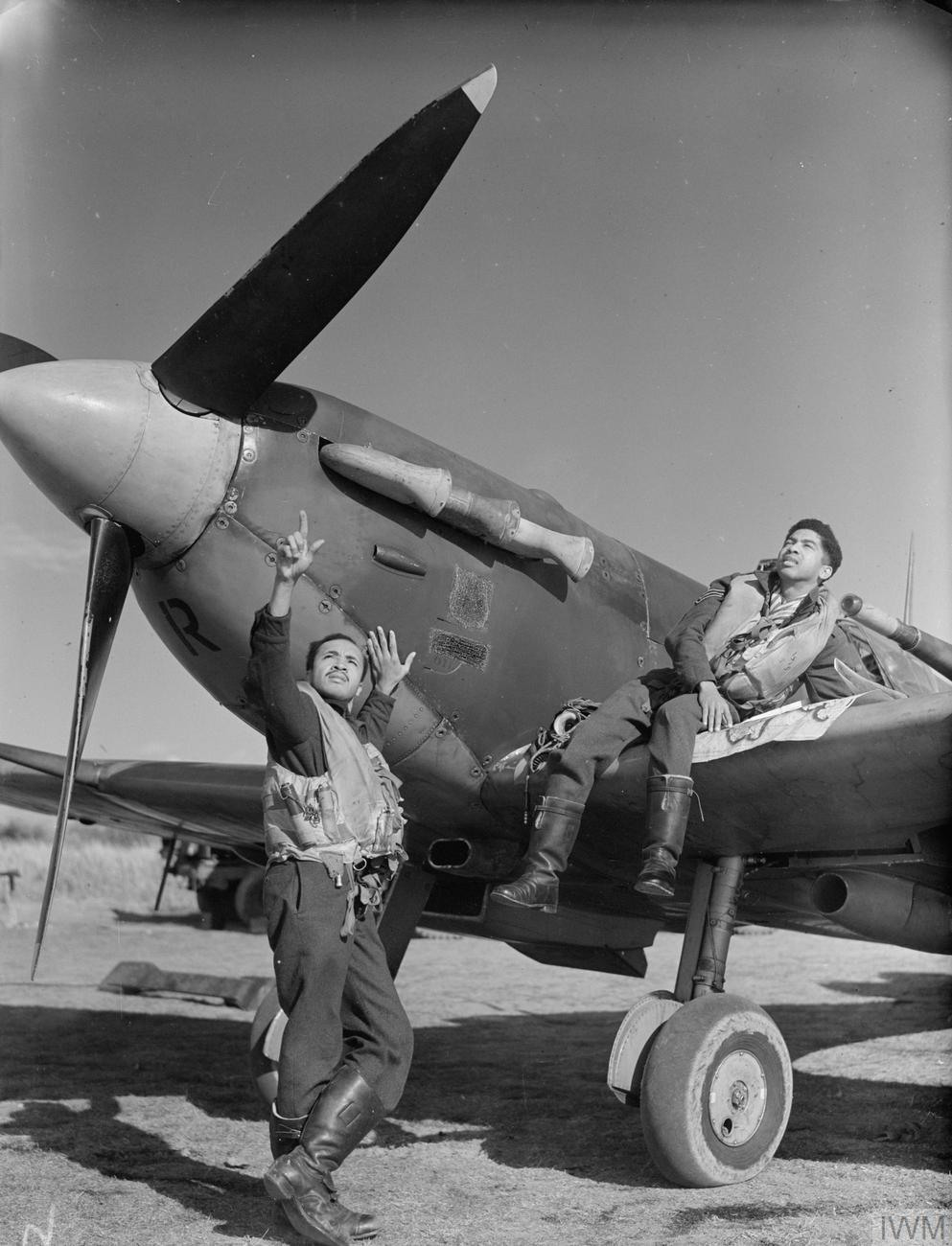
Royal Air Force servicemen from the British West Indies, A. O. Weekes of Barbados (left), and A. Joseph of Trinidad (right), during World War II.

Twelve Barbados men made up the Second Barbados Contingent of Volunteers for the Armed Forces. They were recruited for the Royal Air Force. They left Barbados for England in November 1940 to fight against Germany. One pilot was Errol Walton Barrow, later the first Prime Minister of Barbados, who became an officer in the Royal Air Force. By 1945 Barrow had risen to the rank of flying officer and was appointed as personal navigator to the Commander in Chief of the British Zone of occupied Germany.

On 11 September 1942 German submarine U-514 was patrolling the waters of Barbados where it torpedoed the Canadian steam merchant ship Cornwallis off the coastline of the capital city. The ship was brought ashore in Barbados before it was released and was torpedoed a second time and sank. The shipwreck was later turned into a reef and marine park. The prize winning Barbadian novelist Austin Clarke writes in detail surrounding this attack in his novels "Pig Tails'n Breadfruit: A Culinary Memoir" and Giller Prize-winning The Polished Hoe. The books talk about the economic hardship felt in Barbados after it was cut off from global trade by Germany.

== Post-independence history ==
As an independent country, Barbados has a moderate sized military command. Its force is made up of the Barbados Defence Force (BDF), which consists of the Barbados Regiment, the Barbados Coast Guard, and the Barbados Air Wing, in addition to other governmental commands within the country. These forces together are administered under the office of the Prime Minister of Barbados. These forces often act in concert to maintain law and order in the country as well as to root out illegal activity and other threats. With the backing of the Eastern Caribbean's Regional Security System (RSS) Barbados has a framework for calling in a follow-on military command from other Caribbean islands, and in the most severe of cases, from the larger international community. The Barbados Air Wing consists of one Cessna 402 aircraft based at Grantley Adams International Airport.

In 2009 the Barbados Defence Force contributed to USSOUTHCOM-maneuver Fuerzas Commando 2009 in Brazil.

== See also ==
- Barbados
- Barbados Regiment
- History of Barbados
- Barbados Landship
- Regional Security System
- West India Regiment
