= Military ranks of Barbados =

The Military ranks of Barbados are the military insignia used by the Barbados Defence Force.

== Commissioned officer ranks ==
The rank insignia of commissioned officers.

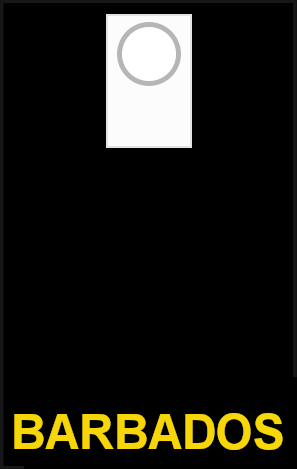
Rank group	General / flag officers		Senior officers			Junior officers
Barbados Regiment
Barbados Regiment	Major general	Brigadier general	Colonel	Lieutenant colonel	Major	Captain	First lieutenant	Second lieutenant
Barbados Coast Guard
Barbados Coast Guard	Rear admiral	Commodore	Captain	Commander	Lieutenant commander	Lieutenant	Sub lieutenant	Midshipman
Rank group	General / flag officers		Senior officers			Junior officers

=== Student officer ranks ===
Rank group	Student officer
Officer cadet

== Other ranks ==
The rank insignia of non-commissioned officers and enlisted personnel.

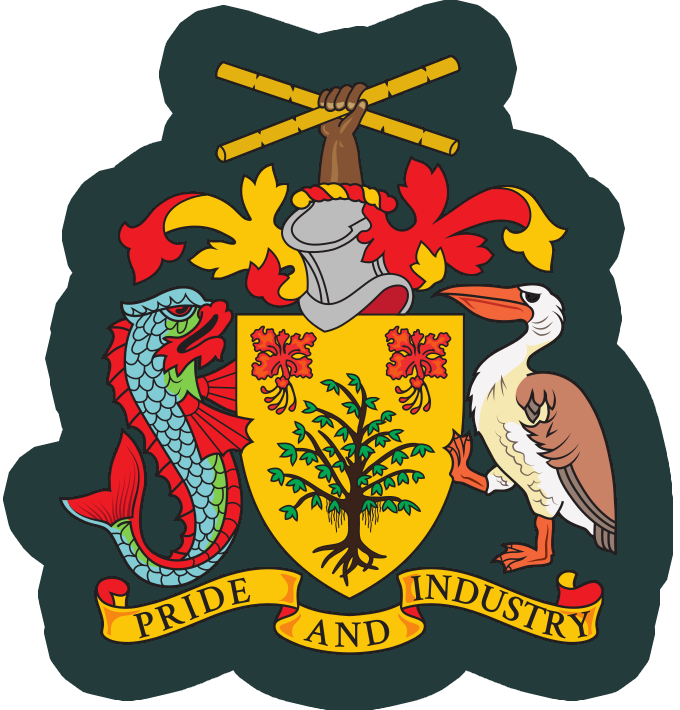
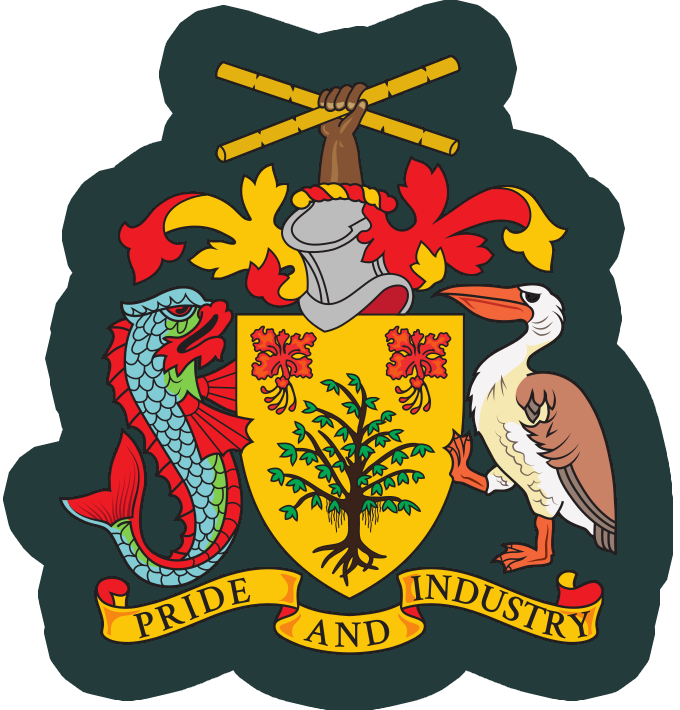
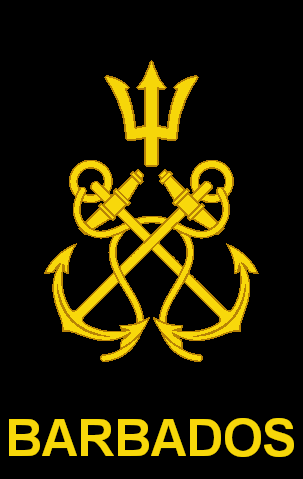
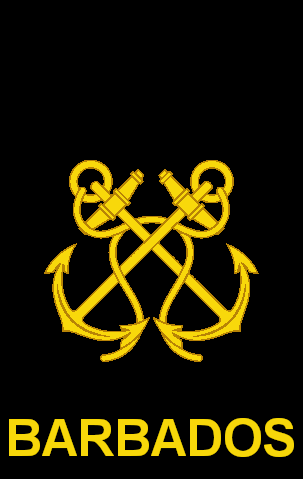
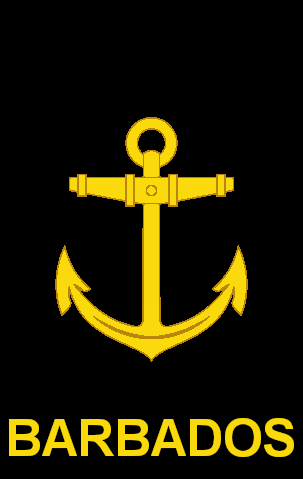
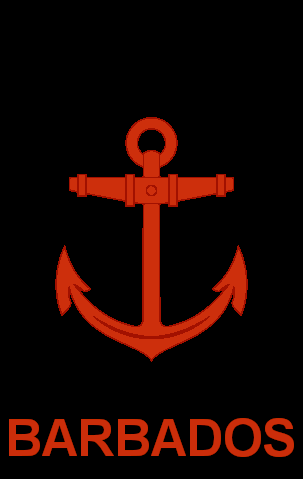
Rank group	Senior NCOs				Junior NCOs		Enlisted
Barbados Regiment							No insignia
Barbados Regiment	Warrant officer class 1	Warrant officer class 2	Staff sergeant	Sergeant	Corporal	Lance corporal	Private (or equivalent)
Barbados Coast Guard								No insignia
Barbados Coast Guard	Master chief petty officer class 1	Master chief petty officer class 2	Chief petty officer	Petty officer	Leading seaman		Able seaman	Seaman
Rank group	Senior NCOs				Junior NCOs		Enlisted

== Historical ranks ==
Commissioned officers

Rank group	General / flag officers		Senior officers			Junior officers
Barbados Regiment (–2024)
Barbados Regiment (–2024)	Major general	Brigadier general	Colonel	Lieutenant colonel	Major	Captain	First lieutenant	Second lieutenant

Other ranks

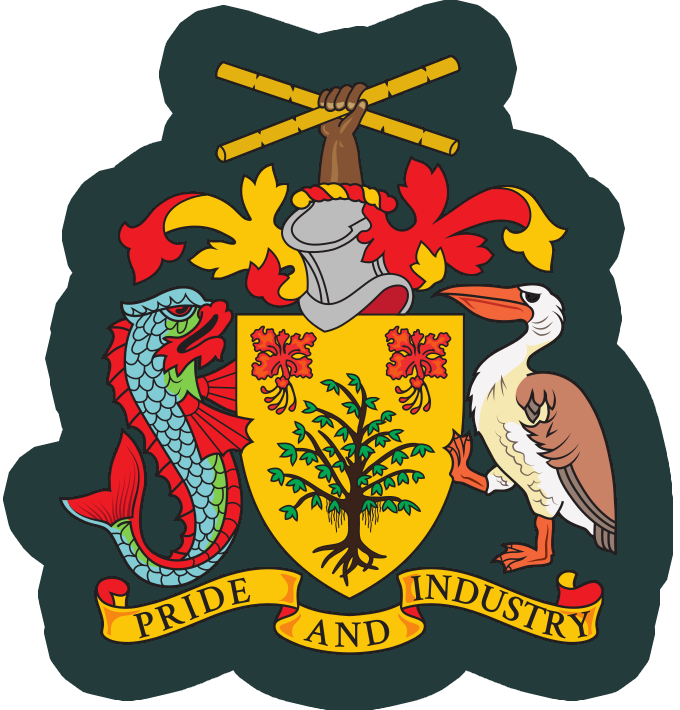
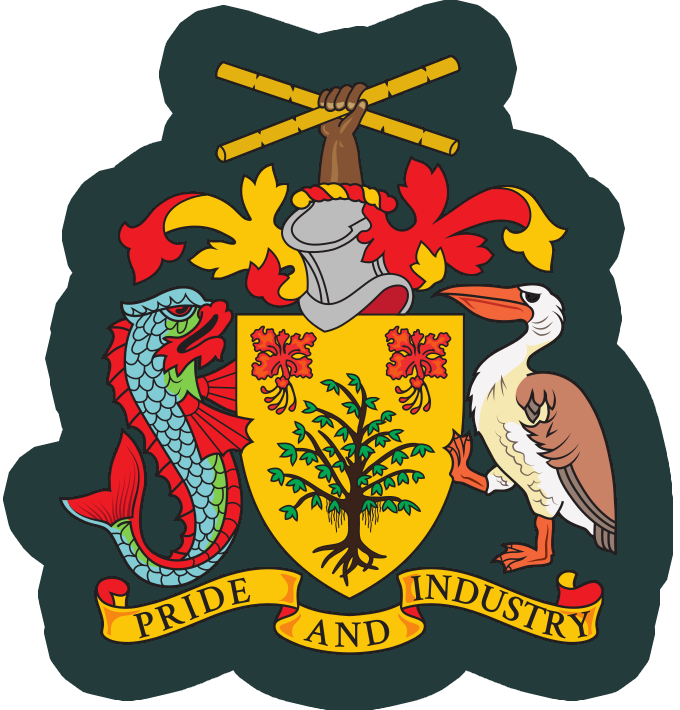
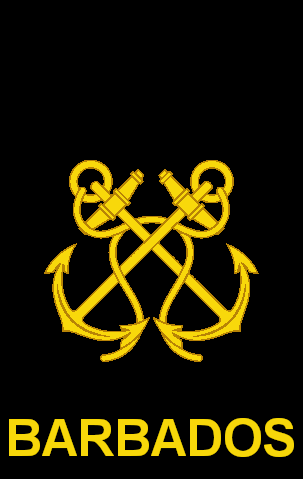
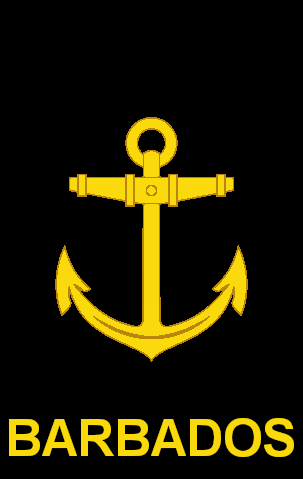
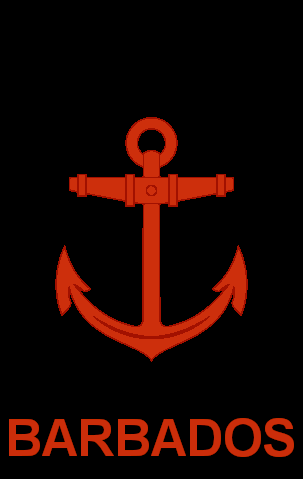
Rank group	Senior NCOs				Junior NCOs		Enlisted
Barbados Regiment (2018–2021)							No insignia
Barbados Regiment (2018–2021)	Warrant Officer Class 1	Warrant Officer Class 2	Staff Sergeant	Sergeant	Corporal	Lance Corporal	Private (or equivalent)
Barbados Regiment (–2018)							No insignia
Barbados Regiment (–2018)	Warrant Officer Class 1	Warrant Officer Class 2	Staff Sergeant	Sergeant	Corporal	Lance Corporal	Private (or equivalent)
Barbados Coast Guard (–2021)								No insignia
Barbados Coast Guard (–2021)	Master chief petty officer class 1	Master chief petty officer class 2	Chief petty officer	Petty officer	Leading seaman		Able seaman	Seaman

Appointments

	Other rank insignia
Barbados Regiment (2018–2021)
Barbados Regiment (2018–2021)	Regimental sergeant major
