= Chief of Staff (Barbados) =

- Incumbent; Brigadier Carlos Lovell since 18 September 2024
- Headquarters Barbados Defence Force
- Abbreviation: COS
- Reports to: President; Prime Minister
- Residence: St. Ann's Fort The Garrison
- Formation: 15 August 1979
- First holder: Colonel Leonard Banfield
- Deputy: Deputy Chief of Staff
- Website: Official website

The Chief of Staff (COS) is the professional head of the Barbados Defence Force and the most senior uniformed military adviser to the Prime Minister of Barbados (Chairman of the Defence Board and Minister of National Security). The office of the (COS) is responsible for the administrative and operational control of the Barbados Armed Forces and is based at St. Ann's Fort The Garrison, Saint Michael.

== List of Chiefs ==
| No. | Picture | Chief of Staff | Took office | Left office | Time in office | Ref. |
|---|---|---|---|---|---|---|
| 1 | Leonard Banfield | Colonel; Leonard Banfield | 15 August 1979 | 1980 | 0–1 years | |
| 2 | Rudyard Lewis | Brigadier; Rudyard Lewis | 1980 | 1999 | 18–19 years | |
| 3 | Deighton Maynard | Colonel; Deighton Maynard | 1999 | September 2003 | 3–4 years | |
| 4 | Alvin Quintyne | Colonel; Alvin Quintyne | September 2003 | 1 February 2017 | 13 years | |
| 5 | Glyne Sinatra Grannum | Colonel; Glyne Sinatra Grannum | 1 February 2017 | 31 August 2021 | 4 years, 211 days | |
| 6 | Errington Shurland | Rear Admiral; Errington Shurland | 1 September 2021 | 18 September 2024 | 3 years, 17 days | |
| 7 | Carlos Lovell | Brigadier; Carlos Lovell | 18 September 2024 | Incumbent | 1 year, 354 days | |
