= Barbados Defence Force Band =

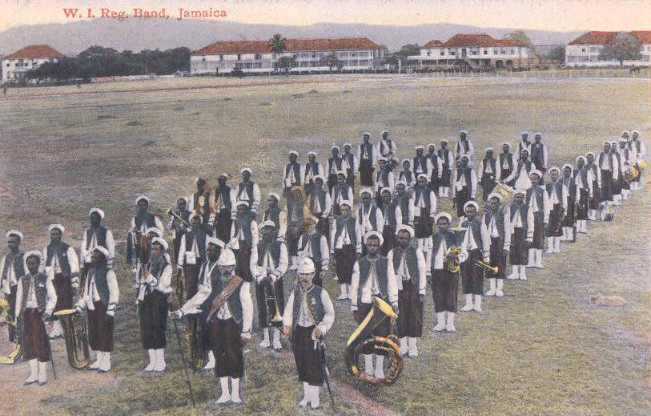
The band is the successor to the bands of the British-era West India Regiments, seen here in Jamaica in 1907.

The Barbados Defence Force Band (also known as the Zouave Band), is a musical element of the reserve units that make up the Headquarters Company, Barbados Regiment and the Barbados Defence Force. The musicians mainly range in ages between 18 and 50 years old and perform several types of music from light classics to Barbadian native music. The band is currently directed by Director of Music, Lieutenant Brian Cole.

It has also participated military events of the Jamaica Defence Force, parading alongside the JDF Band, The Jamaica Regiment Band and Corps of Drums at the request of the JDF.

== History ==
A Corps of Drums remained active in the Barbados Volunteer Force and the Barbados Regiment until the early 1970s. A full band was raised in 1973 as the Band and Drums of the Barbados Regiment and was fully resuscitated in 1987 for the occasion of the Trooping the Colour parade in Barbados. It remained active until the early 1990s, and after a brief hiatus, the band was again revived as the Barbados Defence Force Band. In 1999, an improvement and substantial growth of the band facilitated their first major performance at the Royal Edinburgh Military Tattoo that year.

== Lineage ==
The BDF Band traces its history back to the West India Regiment Band, which is considered to be the precursor to most Caribbean military bands under the control of the British Army. As a result, the band has a shared history with the aforementioned Jamaica Military Band. It also shares a lineage with the Corps of Drums of the Barbados Volunteer Force.

== Particularities ==
=== Public Duties ===
Performances by BDF Band include:

- Public concerts in the Saint Michael
- Military and patriotic ceremonies
  - State arrival ceremonies
  - Military parades
  - Military tattoos
  - Passing out parades
  - Change of Command parades
  - Presentation of Colours
- Public holidays in Barbados
  - Remembrance Day
  - Independence Day
- State Funerals
- Musical concerts
- Guard mounting at The Garrison, Saint Michael

It takes part in the We Barbados procession through Bridgetown on Independence Day annually. The band parades with a corps of drums who also double as bugler's.

=== Extra functions ===
The associates itself with its police band counterpart, the Barbados Police Band. In 2017, the band hosted international pipe bands at the Barbados Celtic Festival. Many senior directors of the Barbados Cadet Corps Band have served in the band.

=== Uniform ===
In 1856, a type of uniform was adopted for the regiments, modeled on that of the French Zouaves (see illustration above). The uniform was first paraded in Barbados in 1858 and subsequently adopted by the Band and Drums of the Barbados Regiment and the Barbados Defence Force Band as a symbolic tribute to the old Band of the West India Regiment. The uniform is also worn by the Jamaica Military Band. It comprises a red fez wound by a white turban, scarlet sleeveless jacket with elaborate yellow braiding worn over a long-sleeved white waistcoat, and a dark blue voluminous breeches piped in yellow. This uniform was retained for full dress until 1914 and by the band alone until its disbandment in 1927. It survives as the full dress uniform of the band of the modern BDF. The uniform is where the band's nickname; the Zouave Band; derives from. The common belief is that Queen Victoria saw the uniform worn by the colonial Zouaoua tribe in French Algeria. She was immediately struck with the style of the uniform and the British Army to adopt the uniform for one of its regiments, with the honour being conferred onto the West India Regiment.

== See also ==
- Cuban Revolutionary Armed Forces Military Bands Department
- Royal Bahamas Police Force Band
- Fiji Military Forces Band
