= Errington Shurland =

Head of the Barbados military

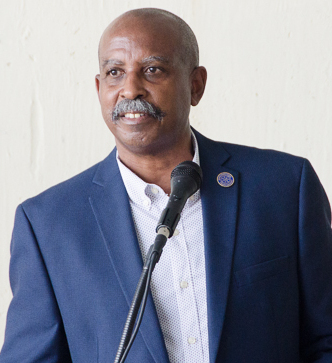
- Shurland in 2021
- Education: Britannia Royal Naval College; United States Army Command and General Staff College; World Maritime University (MA)
- Military career
- Allegiance: Barbados
- Branch: Barbados Coast Guard
- Service years: 1984–2017; 2021– 2024
- Rank: Rear Admiral
- Commands: Regional Security System; Chief of Staff; Barbados Coast Guard
- Awards: Service Medal of Honour; Governor-General's Medal of Honour

Rear Admiral Errington Ricardo Shurland, is a senior retired Naval Officer of Barbados. He is currently The Executive Director of the Regional Security System (RSS) since February 2017. Also, he is a former & 6th Chief of Staff of the Barbados Defence Force having served in that capacity as a two-star flag officer from 1 September 2021 until 18 September 2024.

== Early life and education ==
Shurland attended initial officer training and was commissioned at the Britannia Royal Naval College (Dartmouth). He also attended the United States Army Command and General Staff College and holds a master's degree in Maritime Administration from the World Maritime University.

== Military career ==
Shurland joined the Barbados Defence Force in February 1984. He is a highly decorated officer having been awarded several major honours including the Governor-General's Medal of Honour, Services Medal of Honour, and two Defence Board Commendations.

Rear Admiral Errington Shurland was inducted into the United States Army Command and General Staff College (CGSC) International Hall of Fame in October 2023, for his contributions to fields of military education, leadership and national security. The ceremony was held at the Lewis and Clark Center, Fort Leavenworth, Kansas.

He has represented Barbados several times at events and other meetings including the International Maritime Organization, the United Nations, and the Inter-American Defense Board.

During his time in the military, Shurland has held several appointments including Commanding Officer Barbados Coast Guard, Principal Staff Officer FHQ and also Deputy Chief of Staff all in the Rank of Commander. He was then promoted to the Rank of Captain(N) in his capacity as The Executive Director of the Regional Security System (RSS).

In August 2021, it was announced that Shurland would be the next Chief of Staff. On 1 September 2021, he assumed the post and was promoted to the one-star flag officer rank of Commodore succeeding Colonel Glyne Sinatra Grannum and became the first Naval Officer (coast guard) to serve in the position.

On 18 September 2024 Shurland was promoted to the two-star flag officer Rank of Rear Admiral and officially retired from The Barbados Defence Force on that same date.

Barbados Coast Guard Rear Admiral sleeves insignia

Barbados Coast Guard Rear Admiral shoulder boards

Barbados Coast Guard Rear Admiral Command flag

Military offices
Preceded by Glyne Sinatra Grannum	Chief of Staff; 2021-present	Incumbent
