= KAYO (Albania) =

Albanian arms production company

KAYO SH.A
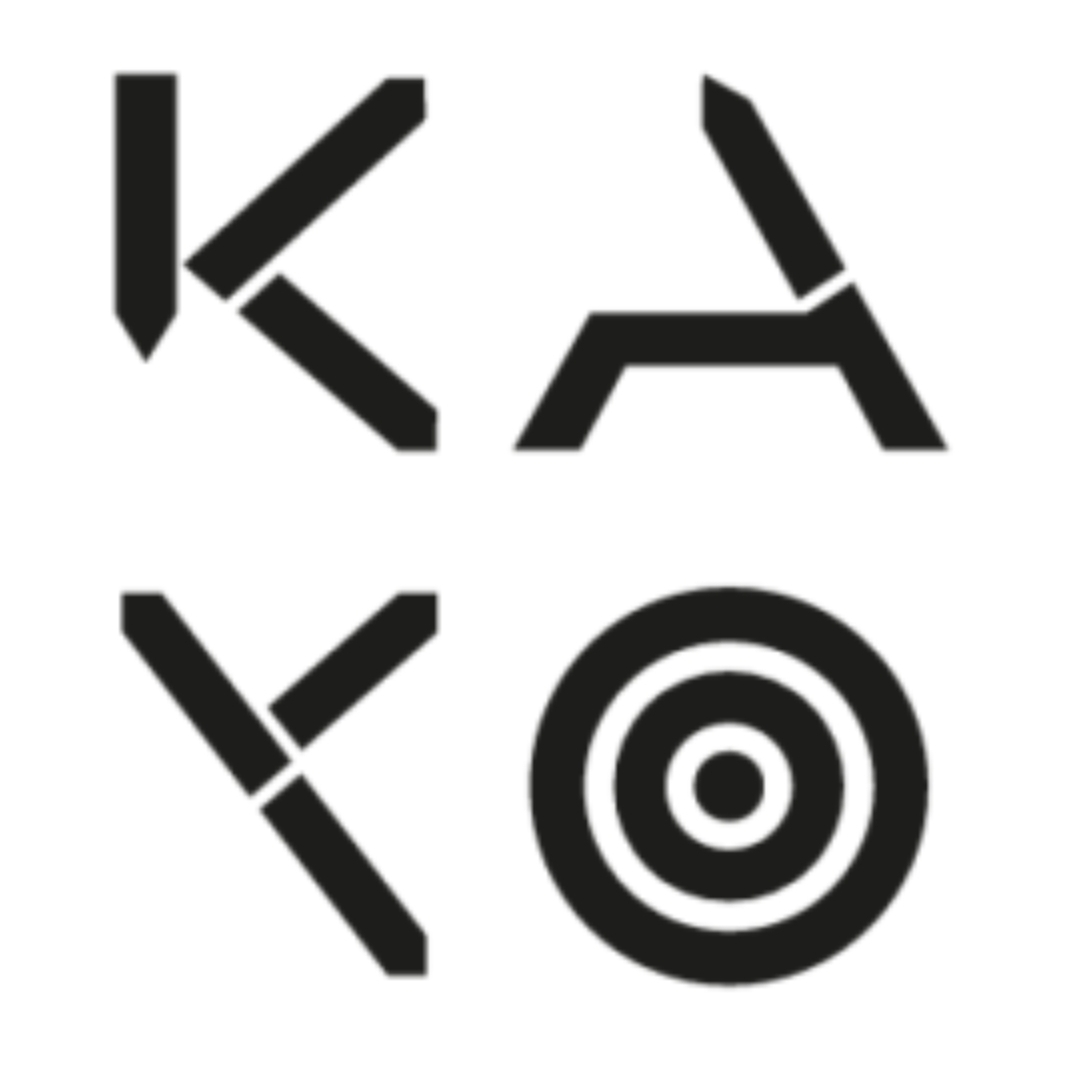
- Type: State-owned enterprise
- Industry: Defence industry, Security
- Founded: 24 September 2024
- Founder: Government of Albania (Ministry of Defence)
- Headquarters: Tirana, Albania
- Area served: Albania and international markets
- Key people: Ardi Veliu (Administrator / CEO)
- Services: Design, production, repair, demilitarization, disposal, and trade of weapons, ammunition, military technologies, equipment, uniforms, communication systems
- Owner: Government of Albania
- Website: https://kayo.al

KAYO is a state-owned Albanian defense and security company established in 2024. Headquartered in Tirana, the company was created to revitalize Albania's military industry by inheriting and modernizing the production capacities of the Mjekës Explosives Plant, Gramsh Mechanical Plant, and Poliçan Mechanical Plant.

== History ==
Albania has inherited a military industry from the communist era which today no longer meets modern production. In May 2024, the Albanian Parliament presented a draft law on the creation of a state-owned company for arms production, aiming to reactivate the arms industry in Albania. Earlier in April 2024, the Ministry of Defence preceded the reawakening of the military industry in Albania. During his speech in parliament, the government's strategy to attract foreign investors to reinvigorate the country's three idle production sites in Polican, Elbasan and Gramsh was revealed.

The three production sites were built in 1962 to supply the state's armed forces with ammunition, cannons, aviation bombs and mortar shells. With the restructuring of the Albanian military forces following the collapse of the communist regime in 1990, demand for the plants' production fell drastically, leading to the end of production.

The idea of reopening arms production facilities was first articulated during a summit in Tirana focused on Ukraine. President Volodymyr Zelenskyy highlighted the need for armament production for Kyiv.

In August 2024, the government allocated 150 million lek (approximately €1.5 million) as initial capital for KAYO, as part of a broader 440 million lek package for the restructuring of the defense sector.

On 9 April 2025, KAYO signed a memorandum of understanding with Italian shipbuilder Fincantieri to jointly explore naval infrastructure development, ship construction, and training initiatives. The agreement was signed in Durrës in the presence of the Albanian and Italian defense ministers.

== Subsidiaries and Joint Ventures ==
Timak Defence

- Ownership: 80% by Timak, 20% by KAYO
  - Production and adaptation of specialized vehicles, including armored military and protection vehicles, anti-drone equipment, urban security vehicles, fire rescue vehicles, and ambulances.

MKD (Myslym Keta Defence)

- Ownership: 80% by MSSC (MILITARY SYSTEM SUPPLY COMPANY), 20% by KAYO
  - Production and trade of small and medium-caliber ammunition

GUNA TACTICAL

- Ownership: 51% by KAYO, 49% by MSSC (MILITARY SYSTEM SUPPLY COMPANY)
  - Manufacture of military gear and accessories

Strategic Partnership with Fincantieri

- Development of Albania's naval defense infrastructure, including ship construction and maintenance

Engagement with International Defense Investors

In March 2025, Albania's Minister of Defence, Pirro Vëngu, stated in parliament that 21 foreign companies had submitted expressions of interest in investing in Albania's defense industry, which KAYO was established to develop. The proposals included projects related to the production of ammunition, artillery systems and military drones. According to the minister, negotiations were ongoing with five companies.

== Board of Directors ==
KAYO has a board of 7 members, led by Administrator Ardi Veliu, with members including Ida Malile, Gjergji Methoxha, Ermal Nufi, Aleks Marku, Ervin Feti, and Grestian Poçi.
