= Saint Ann's Fort =

- Saint Michael, Barbados
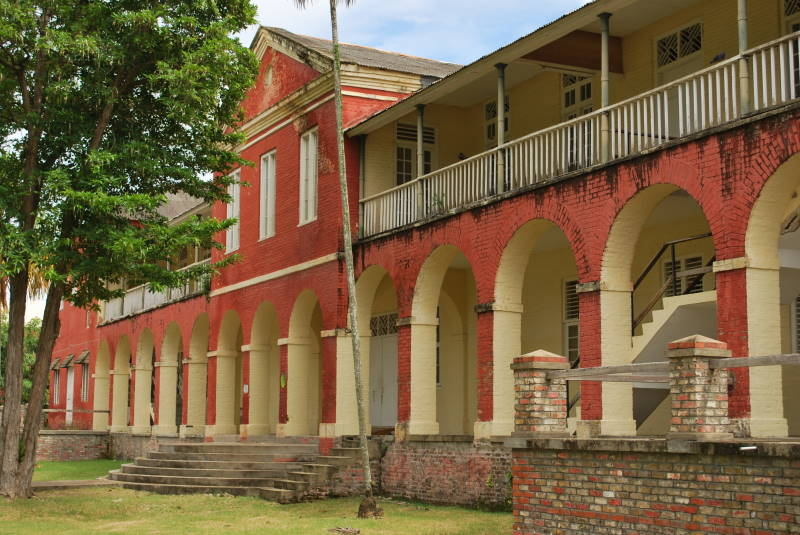
- Former barracks at Saint Ann's Fort

Site information
- Type: Fortification

Location
- Location in Caribbean Saint Ann's Fort (the Caribbean)
- Coordinates: 13.0787°N 59.6070°W

Site history
- Built: 1705

Saint Ann's Fort is a historic military fort in Barbados. It is located in the Garrison Historic Area (also known as St. Ann's Garrison or, more commonly, The Garrison). It was built by the British in 1705, and named for Queen Anne of Great Britain. Today, Saint Ann's Fort houses the Headquarters of the Barbados Defence Force and the Barbados Regiment, as well as the Barbados National Armoury Museum.

== History ==
Construction of the fort began around 1705, after the start of the War of Spanish Succession. It was originally called Saint Ann’s Castle, and was named for the queen of Great Britain at that time, Queen Anne. Unlike other forts on the island located on the coast, Saint Ann's Fort was built inland for back-up protection. The fort was built hexagonal in shape. It enclosed an acre and a half, with walls more than fifty yards long. The fort was built in the Georgian style, and its construction included vaulted underground magazines. Its barracks could house 4,000 soldiers.

In 1780, Saint Ann's Fort became the headquarters for British troops stationed in Barbados. Troops were stationed there from 1780 until 1905. In 1933, the fort's former British Military Prison became the headquarters of the Barbados Museum & Historical Society. In 1979, the Barbados Defence Force was established. Saint Ann's Fort is their headquarters.

In 2004, the Barbados National Armoury Museum opened at St Ann’s Fort in a historic naval powder magazine located on the fort's grounds. This museum has the world’s largest collection of 17th century English iron cannons, including a Commonwealth Cannon from 1652.

In 2011, The Garrison, of which Saint Ann's Fort is a part, was made a UNESCO World Heritage Site.

== Gallery ==
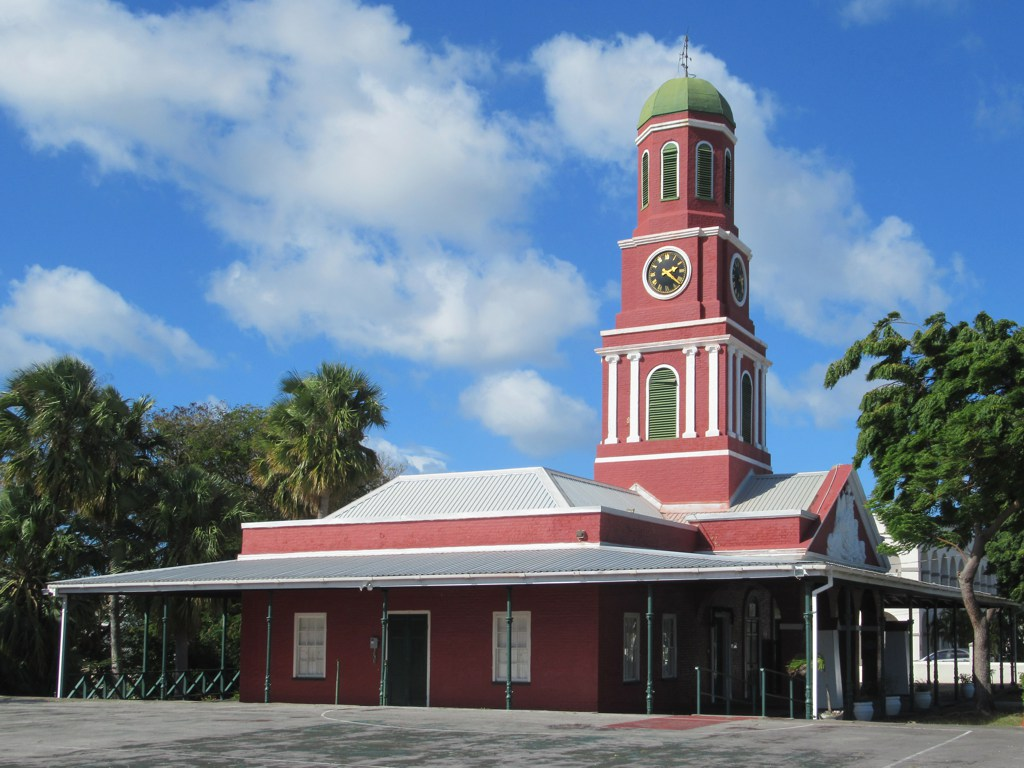
Main guard house

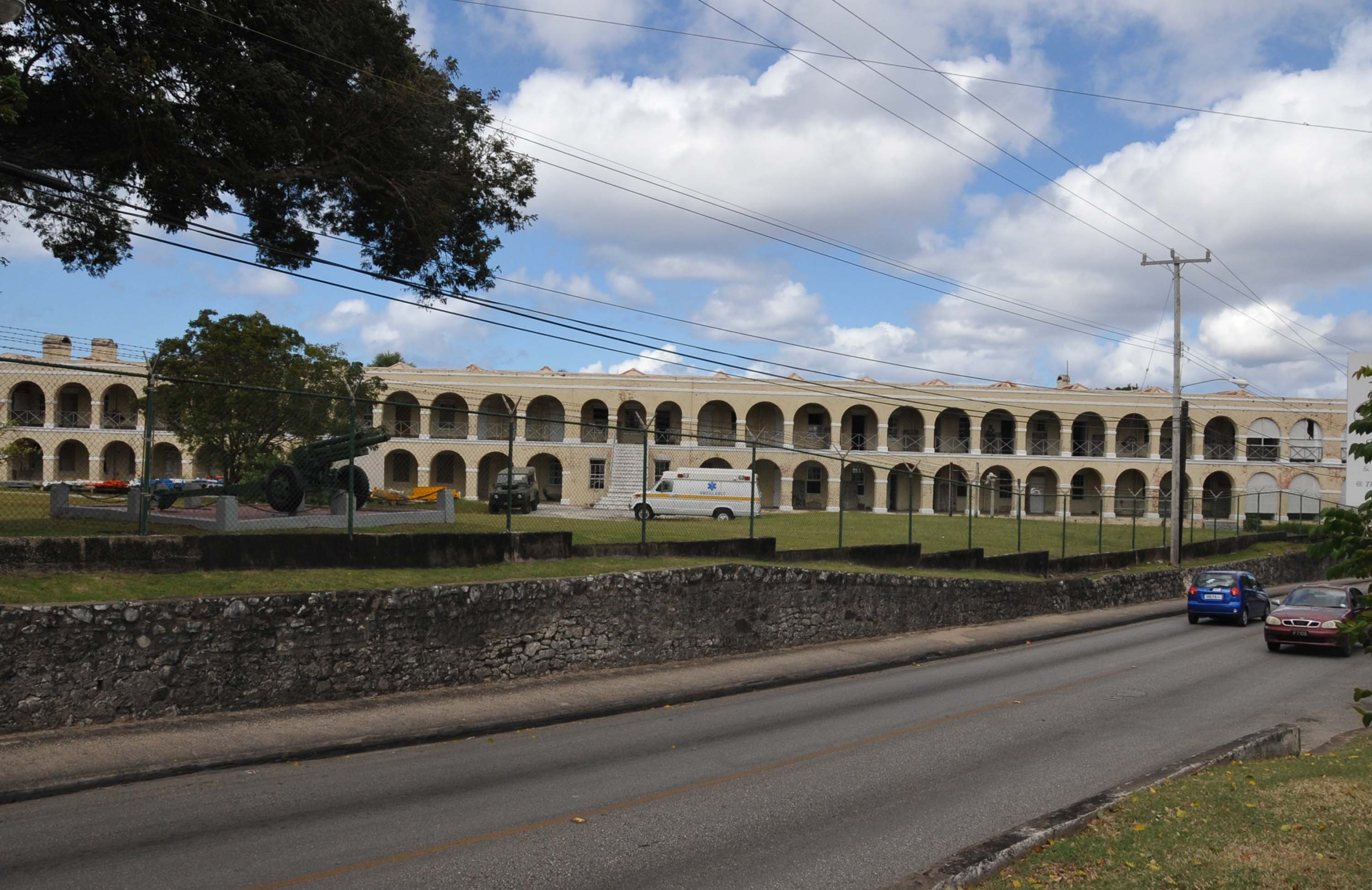
Stone barracks

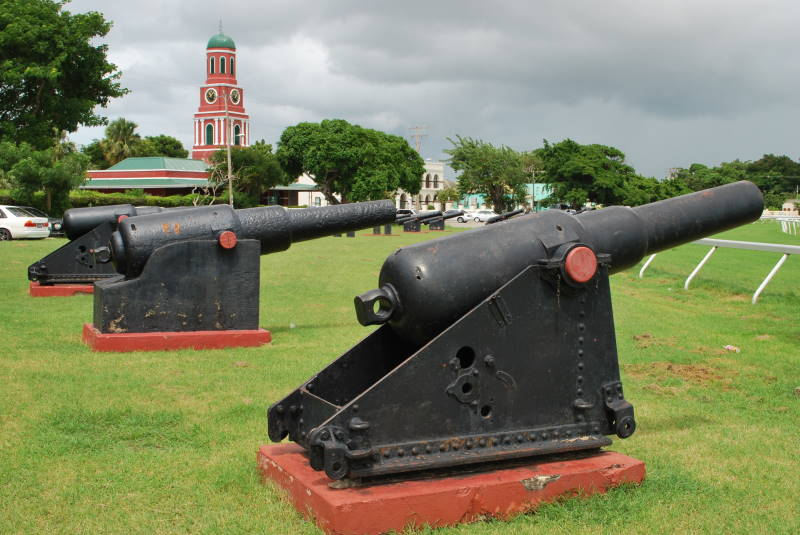
Canons

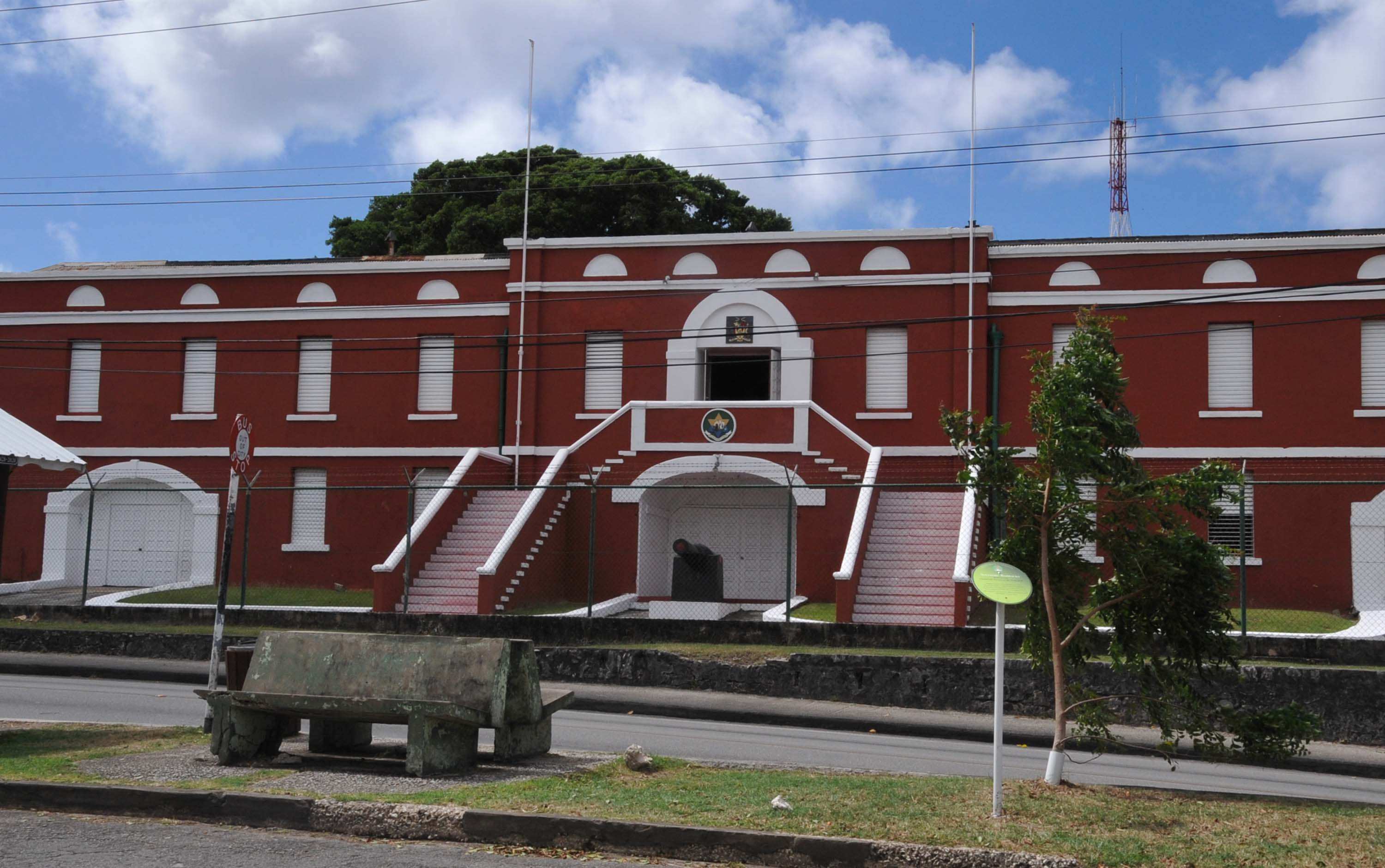
Barracks, drill house

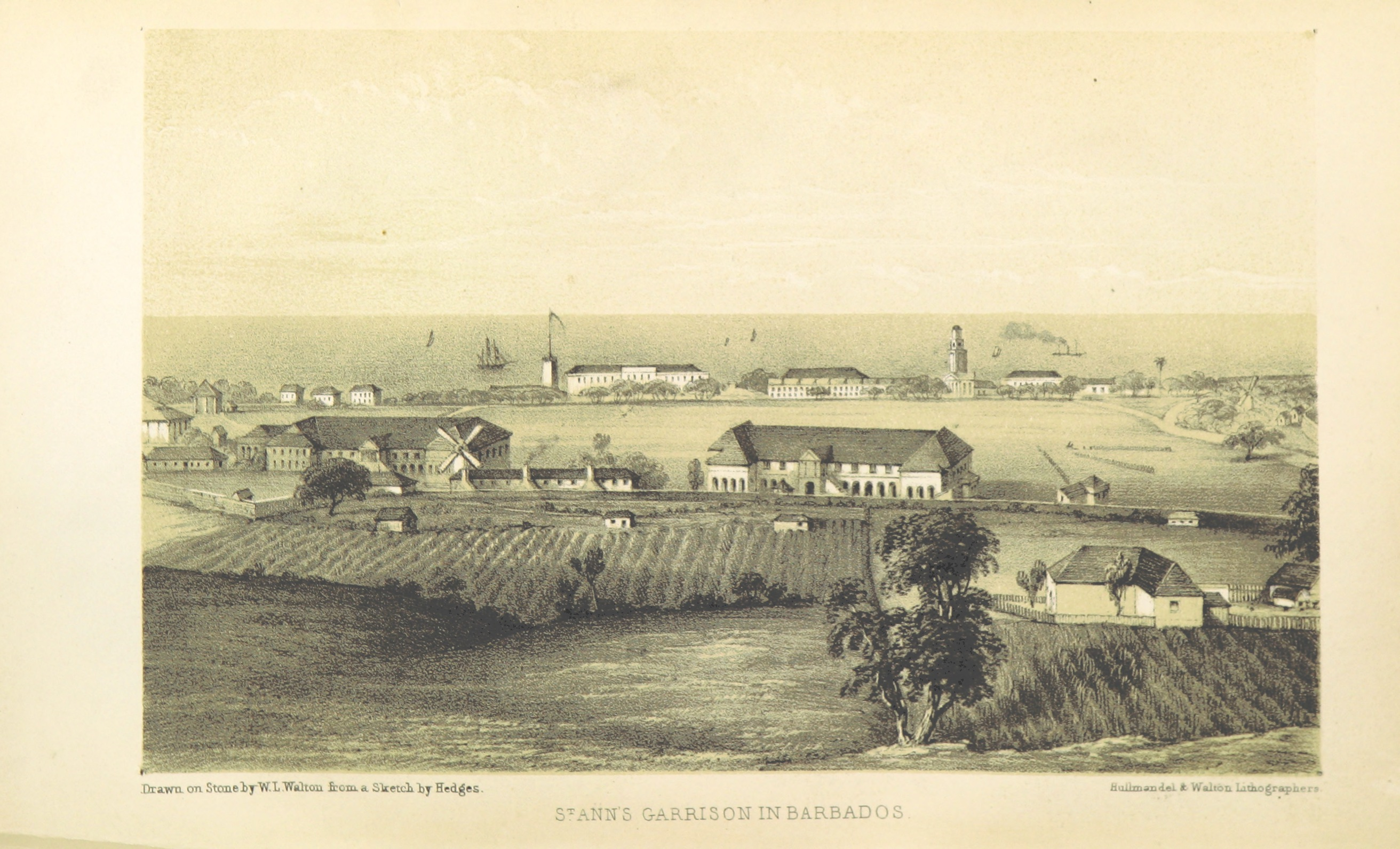
Drawing of Saint Ann's Garrison, 1848
