= Arjeta Puca =

Albanian entrepreneur (born 1987)

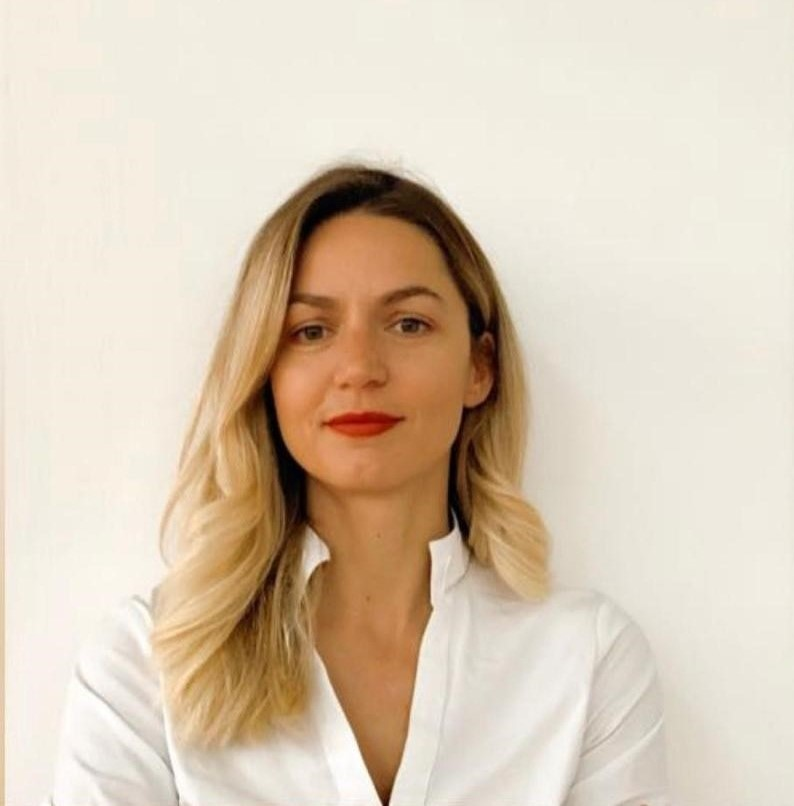
- Born: February 17, 1987 (age 39); Bulqizë, PR Albania
- Occupations: Computer engineer, entrepreneur
- Known for: Founder and CEO of TIMAK
- Website: timak.com

Arjeta Puca is an Albanian entrepreneur, engineer, and business executive, best known as the founder and chief executive of TIMAK, a manufacturer of special-purpose and defense vehicles based in Tirana, Albania.

== Early life and education ==
Arjeta Puca was born in Bulqizë, Albania, and emigrated with her family to Turkey in 1991. Growing up, she worked part-time in her family's workshop repairing vehicle bodies and superstructures, where she developed an early interest in mechanics and industrial design. She later earned a degree in Computer Engineering and gained early professional experience in Research & Development with Bosch in Germany and Japan.

== Career ==
=== TIMAK ===
In 2016, after returning to Albania, Puca founded TIMAK, a company specializing in the production, conversion, and assembly of special-purpose vehicles such as ambulances, fire trucks, municipal service vehicles, and later defense vehicles. Under her leadership, TIMAK expanded rapidly, exporting to more than 20 countries and promoting “Made in Albania” as a label of industrial quality and innovation.

One of TIMAK's most significant achievements under Puca's direction is the creation of SHOTA, the first Albanian-made mine-resistant ambush-protected (MRAP) vehicle, which was unveiled at the Eurosatory 2024 international defence exhibition in Paris.

=== Emphasis on Gender Equality and Women's Empowerment ===
Puca has been a strong advocate for women's participation in manufacturing and engineering sectors traditionally dominated by men. Under her direction, approximately 70% of TIMAK's workforce has been composed of women in technical and production roles, an unprecedented ratio for the Albanian industrial sector.

=== Innovation and Impact ===
Through her leadership, Puca has advanced Albania's manufacturing and engineering capabilities, helping the nation enter the specialized-vehicle and defense-production arena. TIMAK's products have included ambulances exported to Ukraine as part of humanitarian initiatives and numerous specialized vehicles serving European and Middle-Eastern markets.

=== Recognition and Public Profile ===
Puca has been recognized nationally for her entrepreneurial leadership. She was named one of the “Persons of the Year” (2025) for her contribution to Albanian industrial development. She has also appeared in interviews and podcasts, including a discussion with Prime Minister Edi Rama, emphasizing Albania's potential for domestic automotive manufacturing. Her leadership has been featured internationally by outlets highlighting the SHOTA project and the predominantly female production team behind it.

== Personal life ==
Outside of her professional career, Puca is noted for her adventurous personality and passion for motorsports and travel, often participating in motorcycle and off-road events that reflect her drive for innovation and challenge.

== See also ==
- TIMAK
- SHOTA
