= BCGS Leonard C Banfield =

Barbados Coast Guard Patrol Vessel

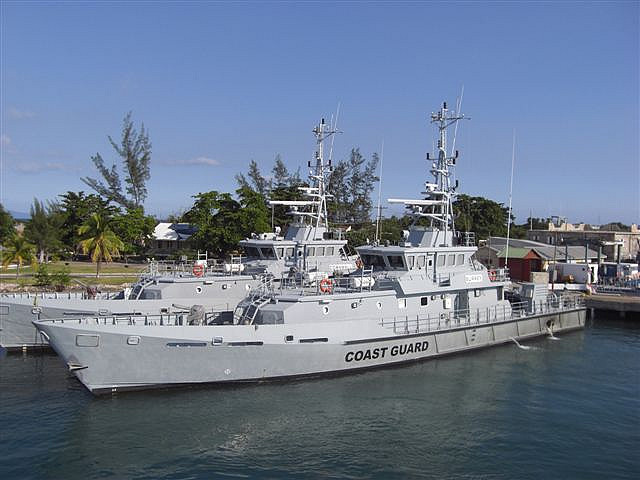
- The Jamaican Coast Guard operates vessels of the same design as Leonard C Banfield.

History
- Builder: Damen shipyard, Gorinchem
- Acquired: August 2007
- Commissioned: 14 September 2007
- Identification: IMO number: 9453951; MMSI number: 314254000; Callsign: 8PZB
- Status: in active service, as of 2010

General characteristics
- Class & type: Leonard C. Banfield-class patrol vessel
- Type: Damen Stan 4207 patrol vessel
- Displacement: 200 tons
- Length: 42.8 m (140 ft 5 in)
- Beam: 7.1 m (23 ft 4 in)
- Draught: 2.52 meters
- Ramps: stern launching ramp for rigid-hulled inflatable boat
- Installed power: 5600hp
- Propulsion: 2x Caterpillar 3516B DITA diesels
- Speed: 26 knots (48 km/h; 30 mph)
- Range: 1800 nautical miles at 12 knots
- Endurance: 4 days
- Boats & landing craft carried: rigid hulled inflatable deployed via a stern launching ramp
- Complement: 14
- Sensors & processing systems: 2x JRC radars
- Armament: fire fighting water cannon; 2x 12.7mm(.50-cal.) machine guns; 2x 7.62mm(.30-cal.) machine guns

BCGS Leonard C Banfield (P 02) is patrol vessel of the Barbados Coast Guard. She was commissioned on 14 September 2007. She is built to the design of the Damen Group's Stan 4207 patrol vessel, a class of 42-metre (138 ft) 240 ton vessels. She was formerly known as HMBS Leonard C Banfield (Her Majesty's Barbadian Ship) but after Barbados became republic she was renamed BCGS Leonard C Banfield (Barbados Coast Guard Ship).

According to Aviation Week the vessel and her sister ships primary armament was a non-lethal water cannon, but she was also armed with machine guns. They reported she was capable of 26 knots (48 km/h; 30 mph) and had an at sea endurance of 4 days. She is built to withstand sea state 8 conditions. She was built in the Netherlands at Damen′s Gorinchem Shipyards.

She and her sister ships are equipped with a stern launching ramp, like some other cutters built to Damen designs. The stern launching ramp allows a water-jet–powered pursuit boat to be launched and retrieved without bringing the cutter to a halt.

Aviation Week reports that the local Barbadian Press reported the vessels cost $6 million each. The BCGS Leonard C. Banfield is the first in a class that also includes the BCGS Rudyard Lewis, commissioned on the 13 of September 2008, and the BCGS Trident, commissioned on the 25 of April 2009.
