= Shota (vehicle) =

SHOTA
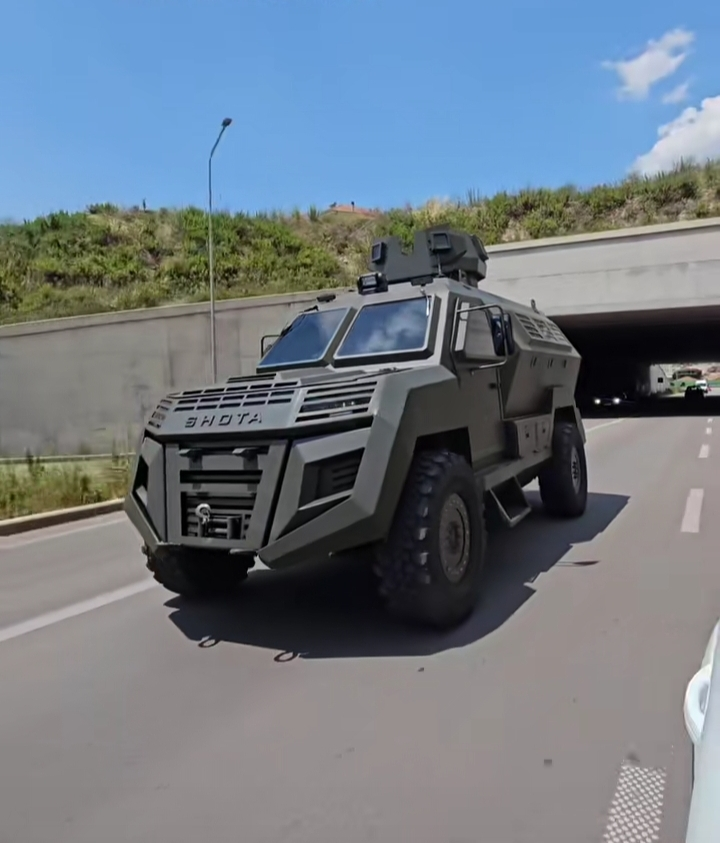
- Timak Shota
- Type: Infantry mobility vehicle
- Place of origin: Albania

Service history
- In service: Active (in service)
- Used by: See Operators

Production history
- Designer: Grigor Andoni
- Designed: 2023 (first prototype)
- Manufacturer: Timak (Albania); Kosovo; Croatia (Potentially)
- Variants: 4x4 & 6x6

Specifications
- Mass: 13,000 kg
- Length: 6500
- Width: 2.1 m
- Height: 2.68 m
- Crew: 10 passengers
- Armor: STANAG 4569 Level 3 (MRAP) a
- Main armament: 7.62×39mm API BZ at 30 meters with 695 m/s
- Secondary armament: Artillery 155 mm High Explosive at 80 m Angle: Azimuth 360°; elevation: 0–22°
- Engine: Cummins ISBE 275 or Cummins ISLE 350; 6 Cylinder 6210cc
- Transmission: SAND and Transmission Guard
- Suspension: Leaf spring
- Ground clearance: 345 mm
- Fuel capacity: 310 liter
- Operational range: 100 km

The SHOTA is an Albanian-made mine-resistant ambush-protected vehicle made by TIMAK (Albania). The vehicle is engineered for maximum safety in high-threat environments, featuring a V-hull chassis to deflect blasts and advanced armor for ballistic protection. Equipped with state-of-the-art communication and navigation systems, it ensures operational efficiency and coordination in combat zones.

== Development ==
Configured to be used in a wide range of missions, SHOTA is built to withstand ballistic arms fire, mine blasts, IEDs and other emerging threats. In a recent announcement on social media, the Albanian Defense Minister Niko Peleshi showcased a major milestone for Albania's defense industry: the development of the country's first armored military vehicle, dubbed "Made in Albania." Peleshi stressed the importance of innovation and encouraged the nation to embrace bold progress. The announcement highlighted the collaborative efforts with the producer, TIMAK, in creating this prototype. Peleshi expressed his confidence that at the Eurosatory 2024 fair in Paris, this Albanian product will be successfully presented on an international stage.

First orders are starting from the Albanian Armed Forces.

== Operators ==
- Albania
- Kosovo will produce Shota vehicles as part of a regional cooperation with Albania.

=== Potential operators ===
- Croatia is mentioned as a potential partner in a regional defense-industry cooperation framework with Albania and Kosovo.
- Germany
- Greece
- Poland
- Ukraine

In an interview with A2 news the owner of TIMAK Arjeta Puca said "We want to start with Albania, but we also have many requests from Germany, Poland, Ukraine and even Greece, with which we are in talks and we believe that this year we will have the first products,"

== See also ==
- Mine-Resistant Ambush Protected Vehicle
