= Barbados Regiment =

Barbados Defence Force military unit

- Founded: 1902
- Country: Barbados
- Branch: Barbados Defence Force
- Type: Infantry
- Role: Light role
- Size: 250 (Two battalions)
- Garrison/HQ: Garrison Historic Area
- Colours: Blue; Yellow
- March: Quick: A Hunting Call

Commanders
- Colonel-in-Chief: Jeffrey Bostic, President of Barbados
- Commanding Officer: Lieutenant Colonel Julia DaBreo
- Regimental Sergeant Major: Warrant Officer Class 1 Shellyann Pollard

The Barbados Regiment is the land force component of the Barbados Defence Force. Its main tasks are the defence of Barbados from external threats, internal security and assisting the local police in maintaining law and order. The regiment also provides Barbados' contribution to international peacekeeping and other missions. In its present form, the regiment was formed in 1979 along with the BDF, replacing the old Barbados Regiment. The Barbados Regiment is affiliated to the Royal Anglian Regiment.

== History ==
The Barbados Regiment was founded in 1902 as the Barbados Volunteer Force (BVF), a volunteer unit raised to provide for the local defense of the island following the withdrawal of the British garrison. Soldiers of the BVF were involved in both the First and Second World Wars as part of both the South Caribbean Force and the Caribbean Regiment.

In 1948, the BVF was re-established and renamed the Barbados Regiment. The regiment received its first stand of colours in 1953. These colours were later changed after the country gained Independence. Between 1959 and 1962, Barbados was part of the Federation of the West Indies, and thus contributed to the 3rd Battalion, West India Regiment. On the break-up of the Federation, Barbados regained its independence and saw the Barbados Regiment returned to service.

Although the regiment's primary role is to defend Barbados, it also provides the country's commitment to UN peacekeeping forces, predominantly in the Caribbean region. The regiment also participated, along with the Jamaica Regiment and the Rifle Company, Antigua and Barbuda Defence Force, in the United States-led invasion of Grenada in 1983.

== Current organization ==
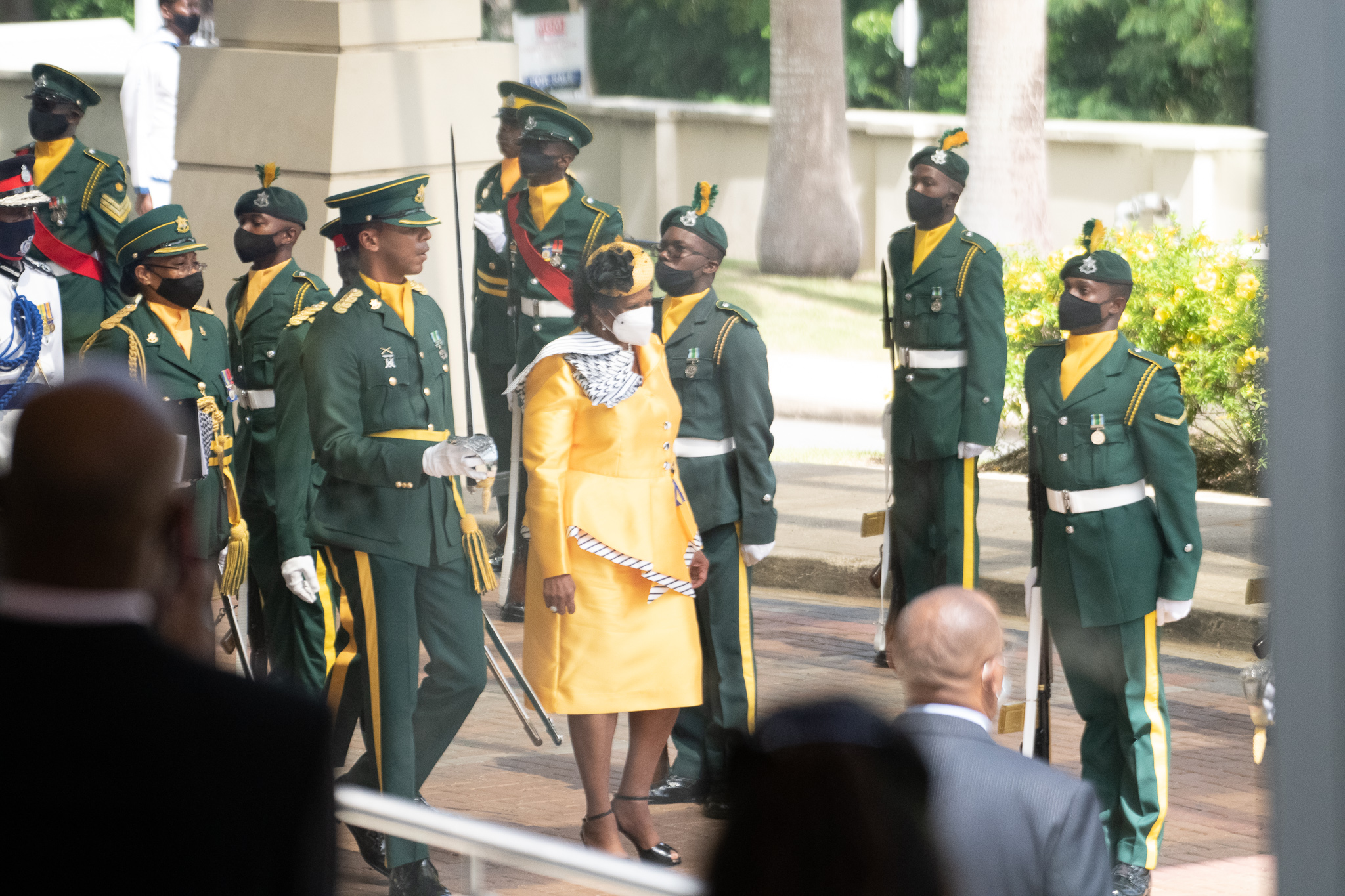
Dame Sandra Mason inspecting the Barbados Regiment at the State Opening of Parliament.

The Barbados Regiment is stationed as part of the BDF headquarters at The Garrison.

The regiment today is divided into regular and reserve forces, essentially making up two 'battalions', though they are not described as such:

=== Regular ===
The regular force consists of three companies:

- Headquarters Company: This provides the logistic and administrative support for the entire regiment.
- Technical Support Company: This provides the engineering and mechanical support.
- Special Operations Company: This is the main fighting unit. Its primary task is to provide a quick reaction force, but it also works closely with both the Royal Barbados Police Force, and the Maritime arm, The Barbados Coast Guard, in anti-drug missions.

=== Reserve ===
It is the reserve element of the BDF that maintains the traditions of the old Barbados Regiment, and is responsible for the regiment's colours. The reserve element also consists of three companies:

- Headquarters Company (which includes the Band of the Barbados Regiment)
- 2 Rifle Companies

=== Air Wing ===
- Beechcraft King Air
- Cessna 402C
- Fairchild C-26 Metroliner

== Colours ==
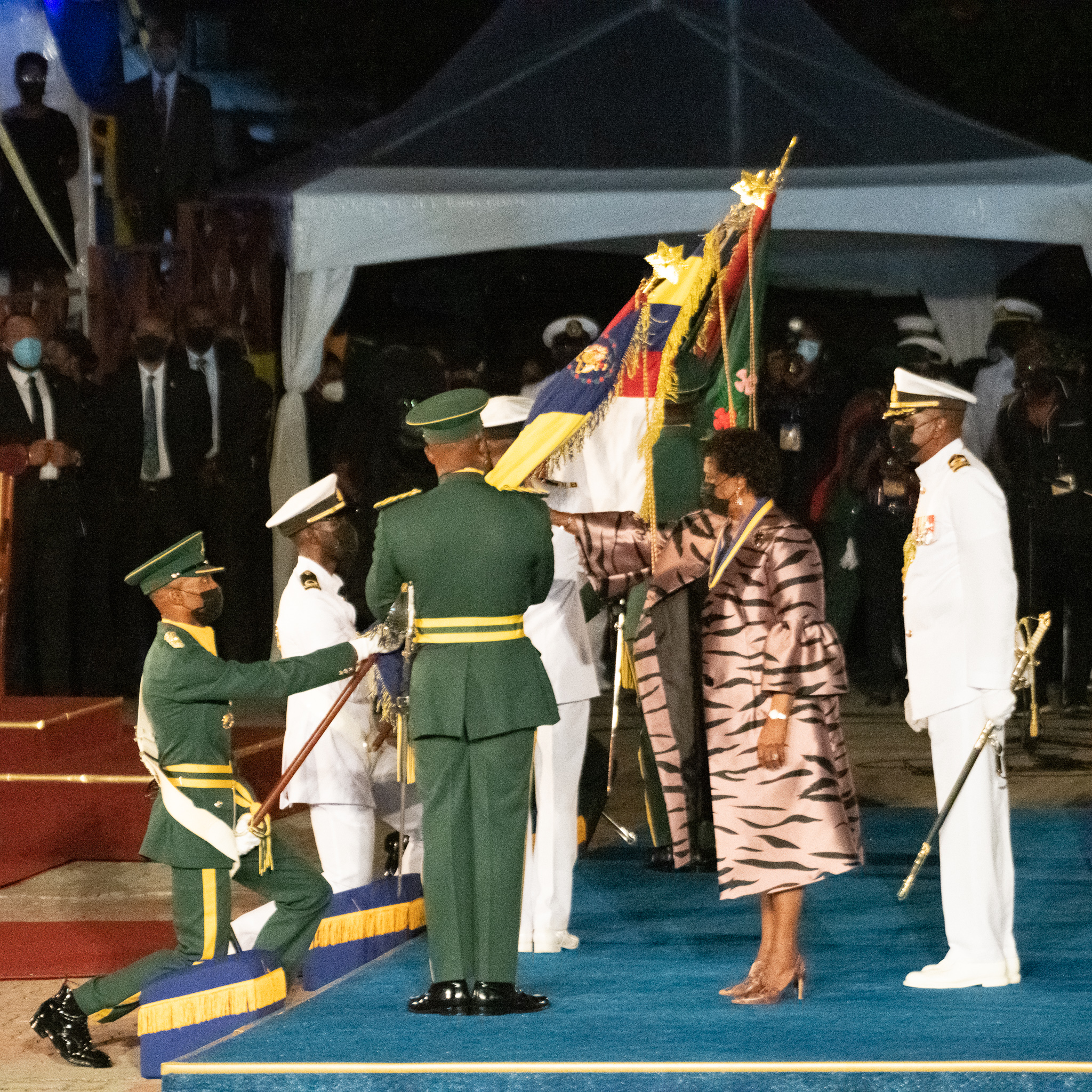
Barbados Regiment Presentation of Colours (2021).

The Regimental Colour of the Barbados Regiment was carried on all ceremonial parades when Barbados was a Commonwealth realm, while the Queen’s Colour was carried only when a guard was mounted by the Queen of Barbados, the Barbadian Royal Family and the Governor-General of Barbados. Mary, Princess Royal and Countess of Harewood, presented the regiment with its first stand of Colours on 23 February 1953. The Queen’s Colour was paraded in a Trooping of the Colour for the first time on 19 February 1975 in the presence of the Queen. It was also trooped on 21 November 1987 to mark the 21st anniversary of Barbadian Independence and on 4 June 2012 during the parade in honor of the Diamond Jubilee of Elizabeth II.

Barbados officially became a republic on 30 November 2021, with Sandra Mason as the first President of Barbados. The declaration ceremony also included a Presentation of Colours ceremony wherein the new colours were presented to the Regiment and the old colours officially retired.

== Equipment ==
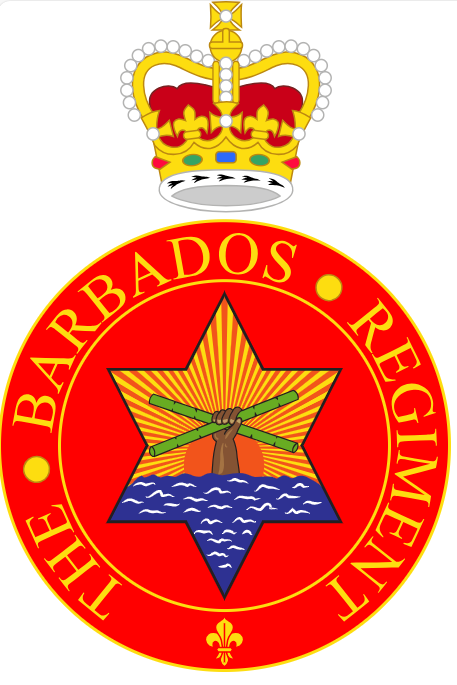
Barbados Regiment logo before Barbados became a republic in 2021.

- M16 rifle
- Lee–Enfield No 4 Mk I – used by cadets as Drill purpose rifle
- Land Rover
- Sterling submachine gun
- FN MAG 7.62mm General Purpose Machine Gun (GPMG)
- Bren light machine gun
- FN FAL

=== Vehicles ===
Type	Model	Origin	Image	No.	Details
Military Ambulance
Military ambulance	Timak Military Ambulance	Albania		2	Barbados Defense force bought 2 Military ambulances from TIMAK

== Alliances ==
- United Kingdom – The Royal Anglian Regiment

== See also ==
- The Jamaica Regiment
- Trinidad and Tobago Regiment
- West India Regiment
