= Barbados Defence Force =

Combined armed forces of Barbados

- Barbados Defence Force emblem

- Flag of the Barbados Defence Force
- Current form: 15 August 1979; 47 years ago
- Service branches: Barbados Regiment; Barbados Coast Guard; Barbados Cadet Corps
- Headquarters: Saint Ann's Fort
- Website: bdfbarbados.com

Leadership
- President: Jeffrey Bostic
- Prime Minister: Mia Mottley
- Chief of Staff: Brigadier Carlos Lovell

Personnel
- Military age: 18 years of age
- Conscription: Voluntary service
- Active personnel: approx. 600

Expenditure
- Percent of GDP: 0.8% (2022 est.)

Industry
- Foreign suppliers: Belgium; France; Netherlands; United States

Related articles
- Ranks: Military ranks of Barbados

The Barbados Defence Force (BDF) is the name given to the combined armed forces of Barbados. The BDF was established 15 August 1979, and has responsibility for the territorial defence and internal security of the island. The Headquarters for the Barbados Defence Force is located at St. Ann's Fort, The Garrison, Saint Michael.

== Organization ==
There are two main components of the BDF:

- The Barbados Regiment – This branch is commanded by the Commanding Officer of the Barbados Regiment Lieutenant Colonel Julia DaBreo and is based at St Anns Fort and Paragon Base. This is the main land force component, and encompasses both regular and reserve units.
- Barbados Coast Guard – This branch is commanded by the Commanding Officer of the Barbados Coast Guard Commander Derrick Brathwaite and is based at BCGS Pelican. This is the maritime element, with responsibility for patrolling Barbados' territorial waters as well as drug interdiction and humanitarian and life-saving exercises. It too encompasses both regular and reserve units.

=== Other formations ===
==== Barbados Cadet Corps ====
Barbados Cadet Corps is commanded by the commandant of the Barbados Cadet Corps, Commander Carl Farley. This is the military youth organisation of the Defence Force. Includes Infantry and Sea Cadets. This organisation was started in 1904. The first females joined the cadet corps in the 1970s to 1980s. The Cadet Corps has a pledge and also a song. It started with 3 normal units but today has expanded to 23. These units are grouped into 5 battalions. There are also a band, sea cadet, and medical, Catering units along with a shooting programme.

==== BDF Sports Program ====
The Barbados Defence Force Sports Program is the sporting arm of the BDF, specializing in the recruitment and training of athletes in five sports; football, cricket, table tennis, athletics and boxing.

==== Barbados Legion ====
Similarly to its American, British and Canadian counterparts, the BDF has a voluntary veteran's organization known as the Barbados Legion. It was founded in 1957, nine years prior to independence. Being a registered charity, it receives assistance from the Barbados Poppy League and the national government.

==== Bands ====
The Zouave Band is the premier musical unit in the BDF, with the other being the band of the Barbados Cadet Corps. Its national uniformed military counterpart is the Barbados Police Band. It traces its own history back to the Band of the West India Regiment, which is considered to be the precursor to most Caribbean military bands formerly under British control. As a result, the band also has a shared lineage with the Jamaica Military Band.

The BCC maintains a marching band known as the National Cadet Band and performs on national occasions with the BCC and the BDF. It is composed of students from public and private schools in the area. They performs in two modes configurations: a marching band and a concert band. The band of dates back to the early 1920s when the local cadet corps maintained a fife and drum corps. Between 1950 and 2006, individual school units had drum corps which catered to the activities of the unit and school. In 1973, the Combermere Cadet Band was formed and for 22 years it was the only brass and reef cadet band among other secondary schools on the island. Its last performance was at the Independence Day Parade of 1995 when the National Cadet Band was formed. As part of the centennial anniversary celebrations of the BCC in 2004, the Band became a permanent full-time unit, performing at an Independence Day Parade that year and again the following year.

=== Defunct ===
==== Barbados Air Wing ====
This branch was formed in 1979, it operated one Beech Queen Air. In 1981 a Cessna 402C was acquired. Since 1985 all aircraft have been retired and the air wing ceased to exist.

== Traditions and ceremony ==
=== Uniform ===
In 1856, a French Zouave uniform was adopted and was first paraded in Barbados in 1858. It was subsequently adopted by the Barbados Defence Force Band as a symbolic tribute to the old Band of the West India Regiment. The uniform is also worn by the Jamaica Military Band. It consists of a red fez wound together by a white turban and a scarlet sleeveless jacket. It survives as the full dress uniform and is where the band's nickname; the Zouave Band; derives from. It is commonly believed that Queen Victoria saw the uniform worn by the colonial Zouaoua tribe in French Algeria. She was immediately struck with the style of the uniform and the British Army to adopt the uniform for one of its regiments, with the honour being conferred onto the West India Regiment.

=== Changing of the Sentry ===
The Changing of the Sentry is an event performed by the BDF that takes place in front of the 1804 Main Guard or Clock Tower. The guardsmen from the BDF are known commonly as The Main Guard. The sentries are drawn by members of the Barbados Legion, other retired personnel, and the Barbados Regiment. During the ceremony, a Corps of Drums provides musical accompaniment. It is performed every Thursday morning at 11:45 am.

== Leadership ==
=== Commander in Chief ===
Since 30 November 2025, President Jeffrey Bostic has been the commander-in-chief of the Barbados Defence Forces. Prior to the transition to a republican system, the monarch of Barbados, Queen Elizabeth II, was head of the Defence Force, with the Governor-General of Barbados as her Vice-Regal representative.

=== Leadership structure ===
- Deputy Chief of Staff (DCOS) - Captain (N) Mark Peterson
- Force Sergeant Major (FSM) - Master Chief Petty Officer Class 1 Austin Howell

== Gallery ==
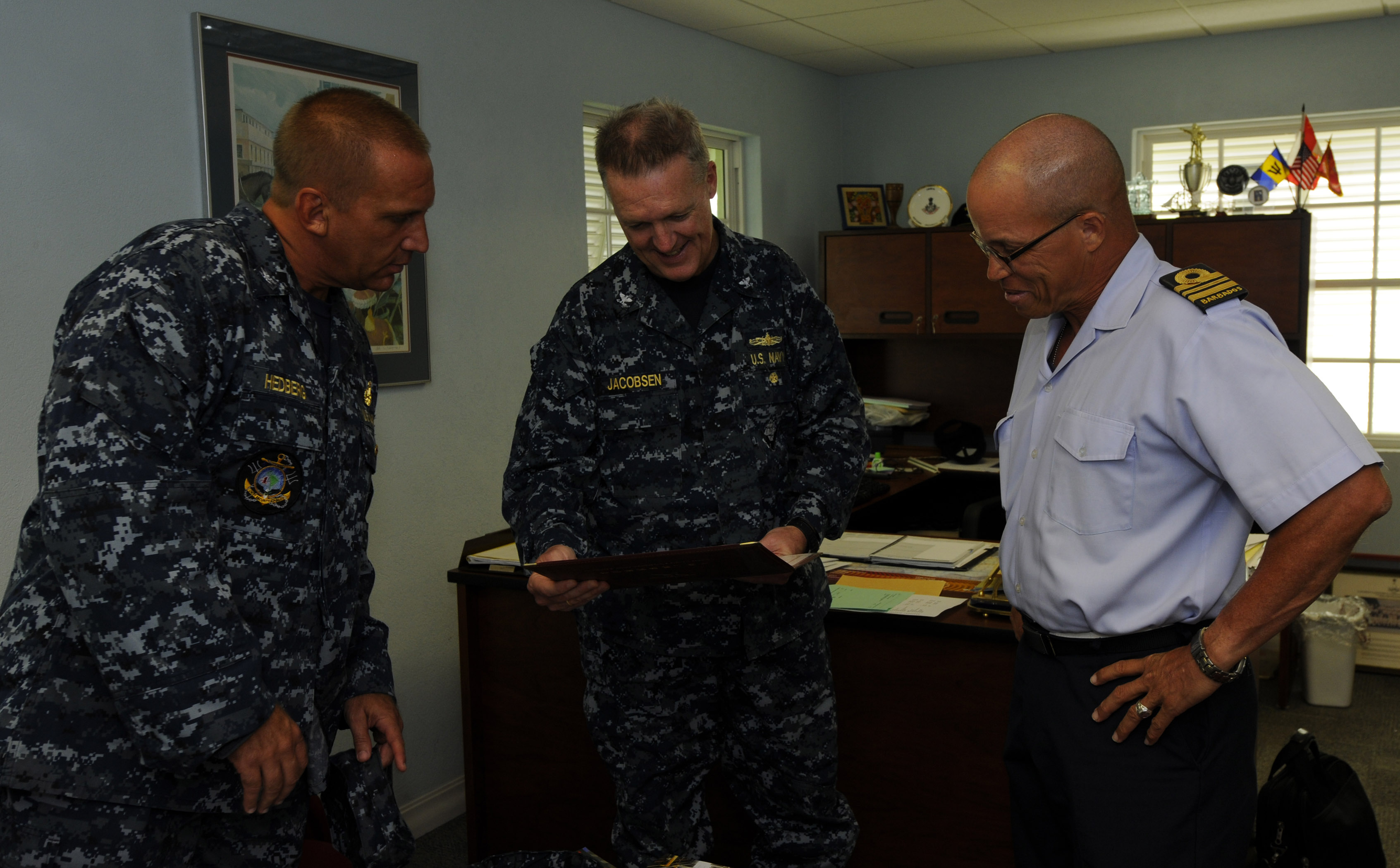
The former Commander of The Barbados Coast Guard, the late lieutenant Commander Sean Reece, meets two US Chiefs of Staff during a visit to the island

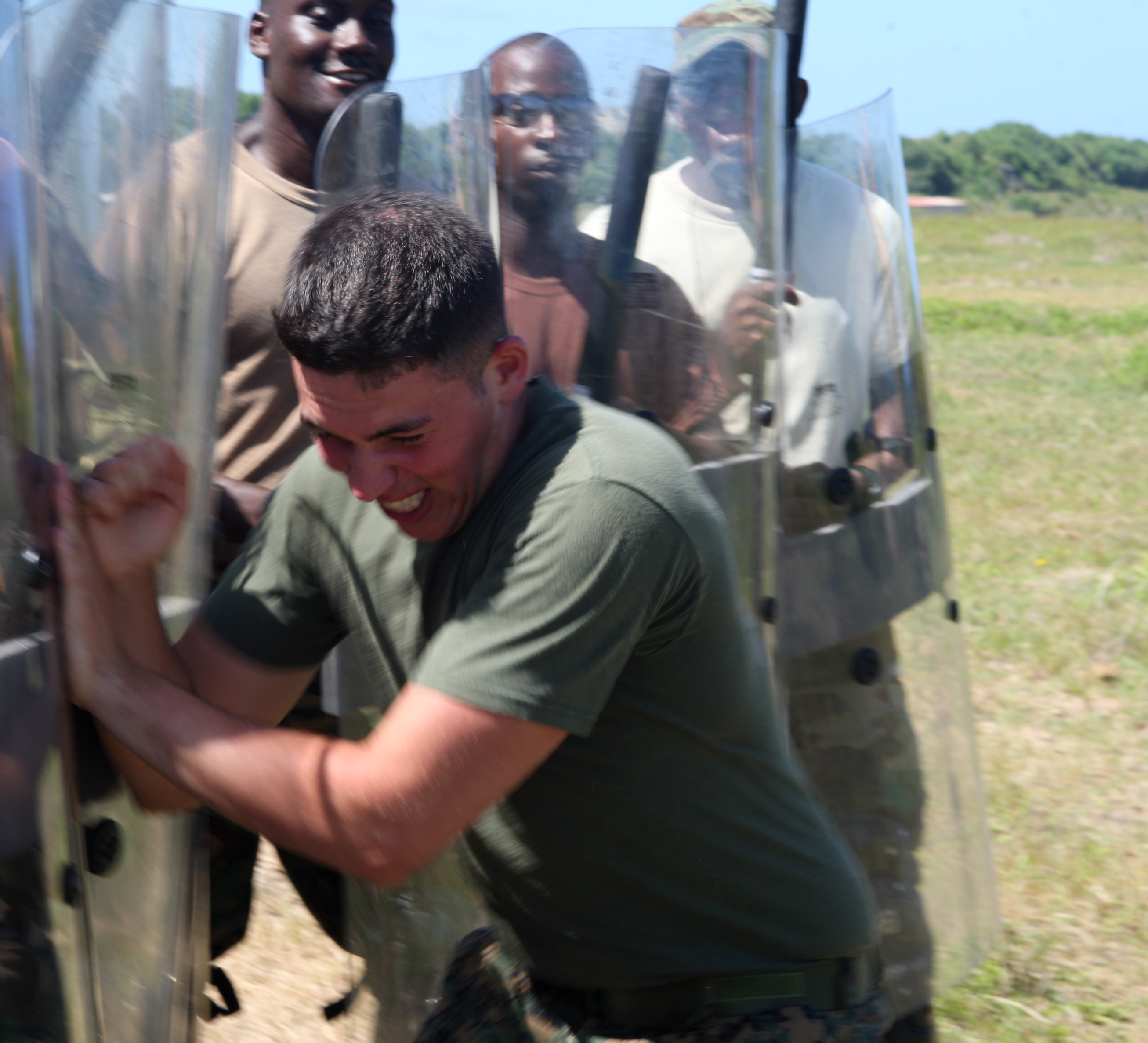
A US Marine participates in a BDF training exercise concerning crowd control

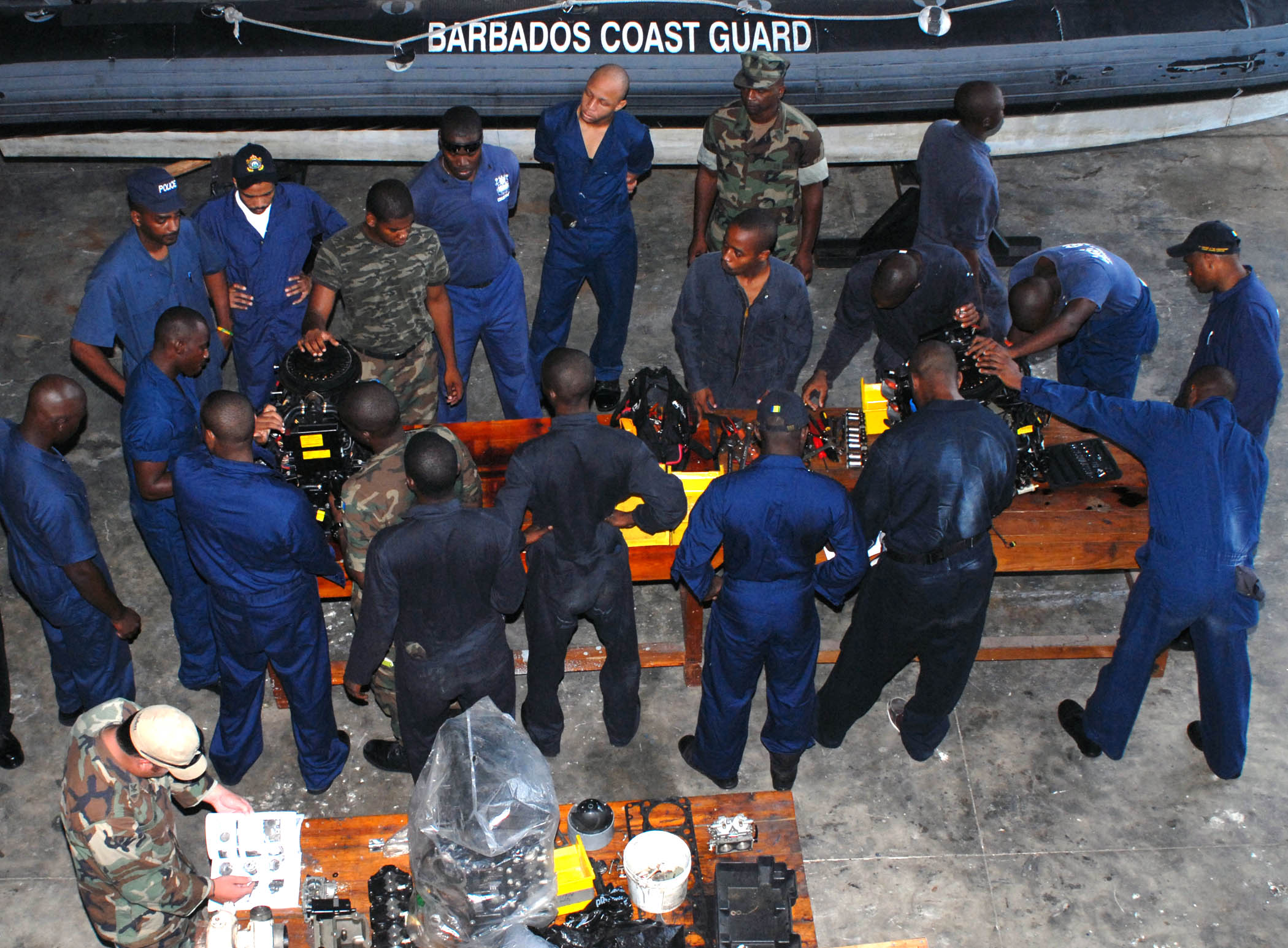
Members of the BDF disassemble a boat engine during training exercises with the US Navy

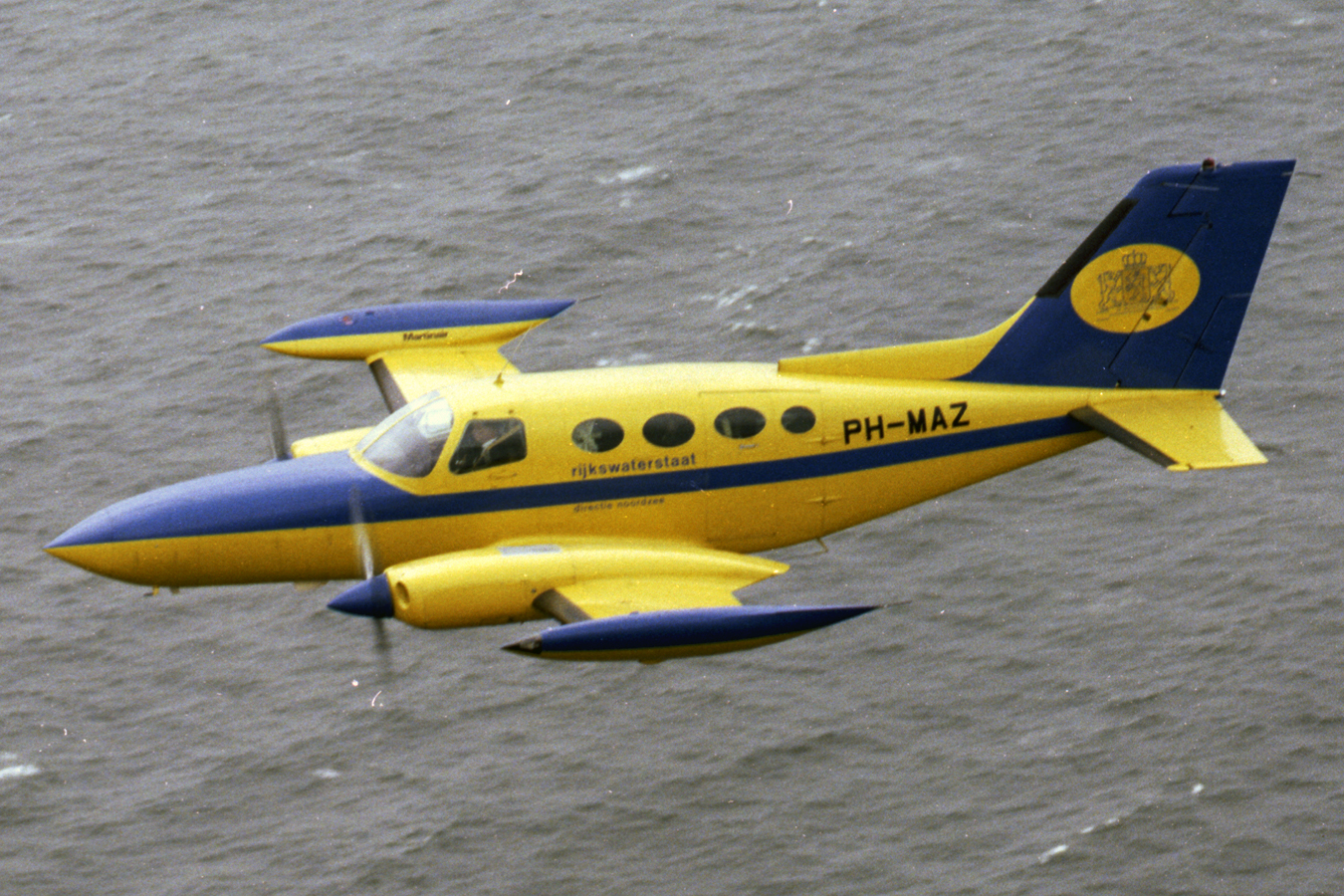
A Cessna 402C similar to the one used by the BDF

== See also ==
- Defence Forces
- Military history of Barbados
- Regional Security System
- Barbados Police Service
