= Garrison Historic Area =

Old town

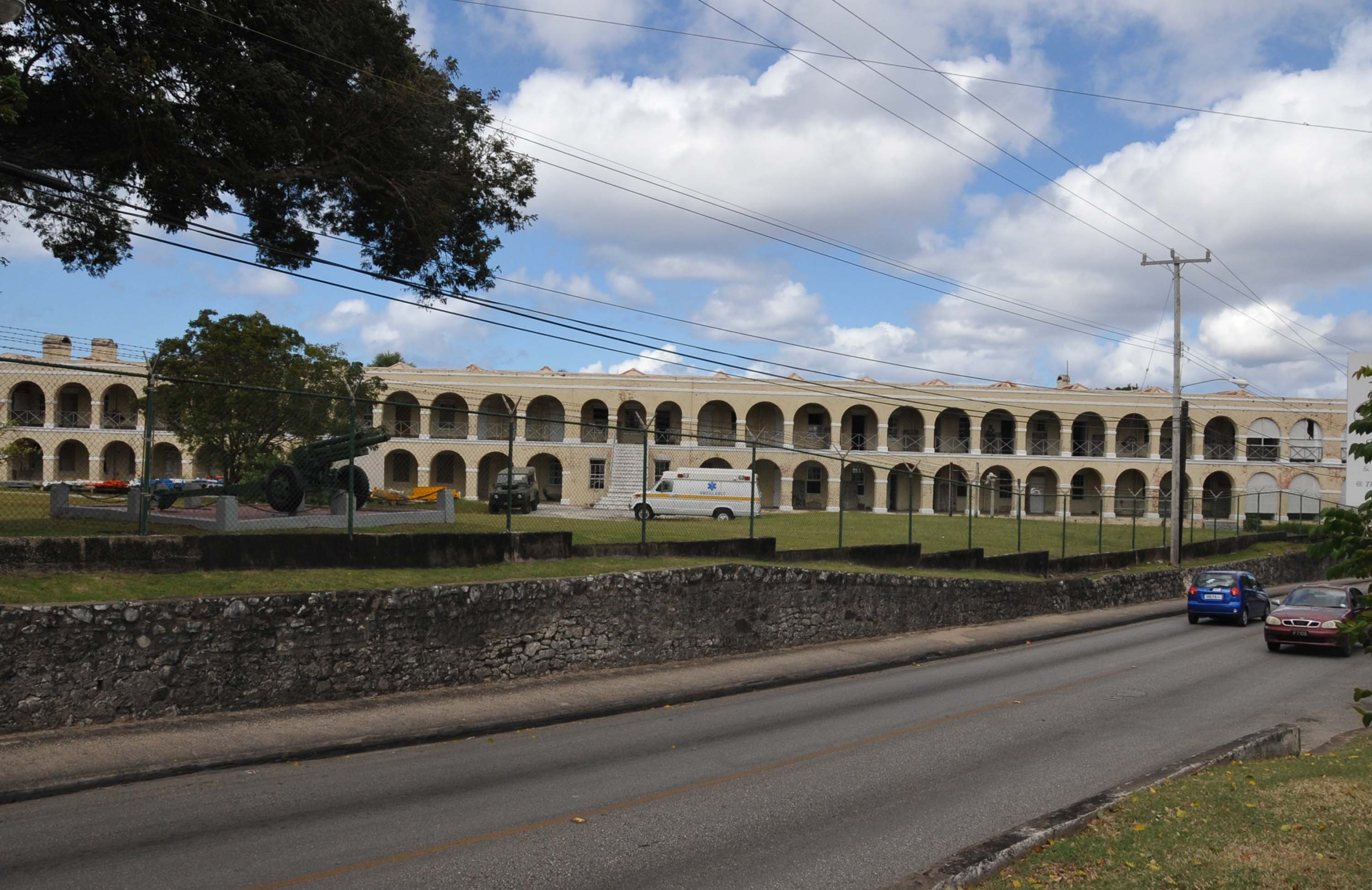
- The Stone Barracks in the Garrison Historic Area
- Interactive map of Garrison Historic Area
- 13°5′48″N 59°36′50″W
- Location: Bridgetown, Barbados

UNESCO World Heritage Site
- Official name: Historic Bridgetown and its Garrison
- Type: Cultural
- Criteria: ii, iii, vi
- Designated: 2011
- Reference no.: 1376
- Region: The West Indies

St. Ann's Garrison, or more commonly known as "The Garrison", is a small district located in the country of Barbados. This Garrison Historic Area is situated about 3.2 km (2 mi) south of Heroes Square in the capital-city Bridgetown, and just west of the village of Hastings in the neighbouring parish of Christ Church. It is dominated by its historic horse racetrack, located on the 12 ha (30-acre) parade ground called the Garrison Savannah. The Garrison area additionally contains many historic buildings including barracks for military personnel. The district is bisected by Highway 7, with Saint Ann's Fort, where the Barbados Defence Force (BDF) is based, lying to the west.

== History ==
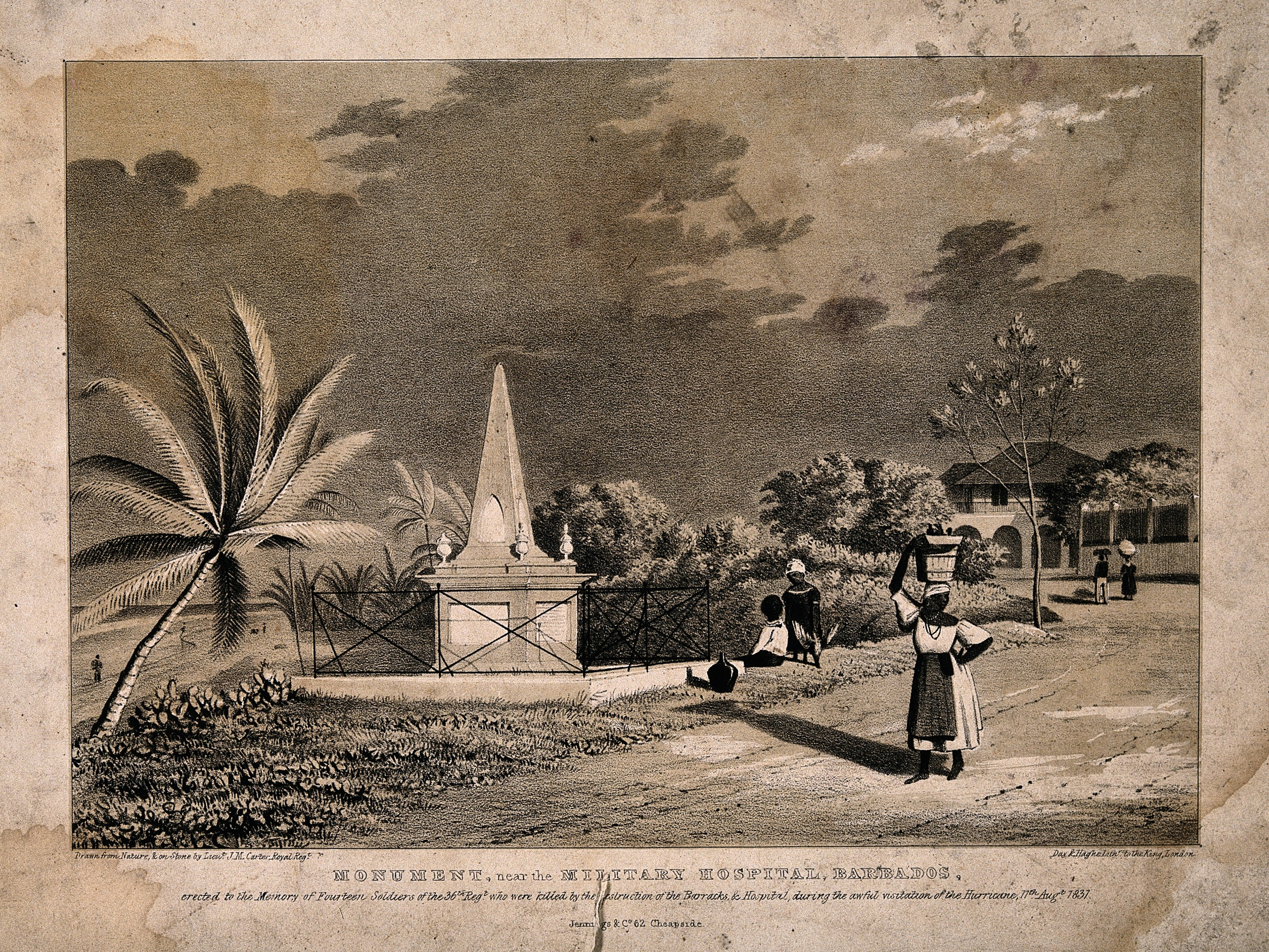
Monument at St.Ann's Garrison in 1837

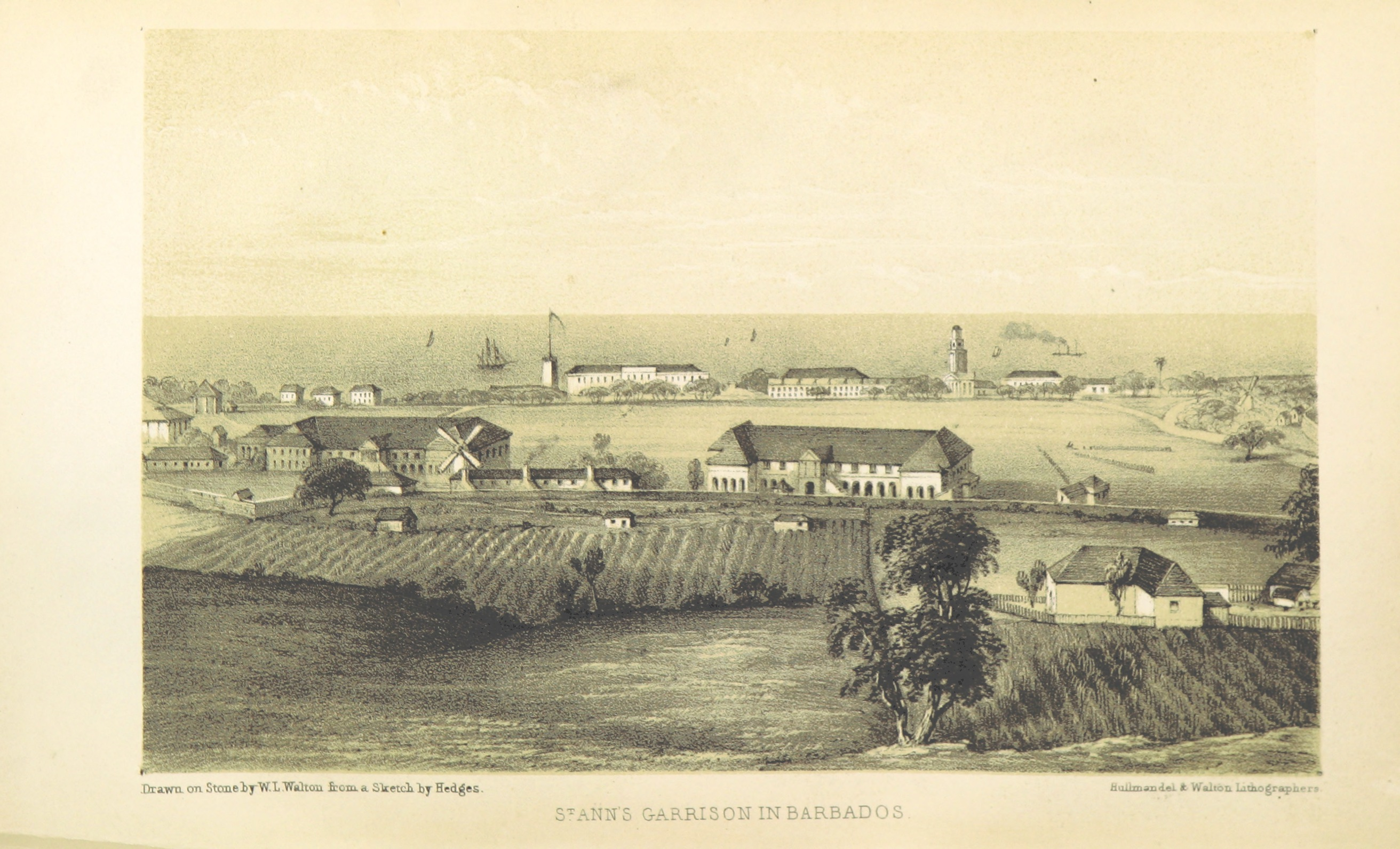
St.Ann's Garrison in 1848

During both the eighteenth and nineteenth centuries, the Garrison was the base and headquarters for members of the British West India Regiment in Barbados. In 1751, the future leader of the American Revolution and first president of the United States, George Washington, stayed with his sick brother at the district's Bush Hill section for six weeks. This restored property remains as a fixture at the Garrison, where it is simply called the 'George Washington House'. By the middle of the eighteenth century, wealthy prominent Barbadians and regiment troops started the sporting tradition of horse racing at the Garrison racetrack.

Major-General Richard Clement Moody (1813 – 1887), who was the founder and the first Lieutenant-Governor of British Columbia, and his brother James Leith Moody and several of their siblings, were born in St. Ann's Garrison, whilst their father Thomas Moody was serving with the Royal Engineers in the West Indies.

On 30 November 1966 the Garrison Historic Area was the location where the ceremony was held for the lowering of the Union Flag (the flag of the United Kingdom), and the raising of the Barbados flag, thus ushering in full independence for the country of Barbados from the United Kingdom.

There are a number of historically significant buildings at the location, other than George Washington House. Many of these housed the Regiment units of the British Garrison, including the building that houses the Barbados Museum and surrounding buildings. Evidence of this includes prison cells of the former Garrison.

== Gallery ==
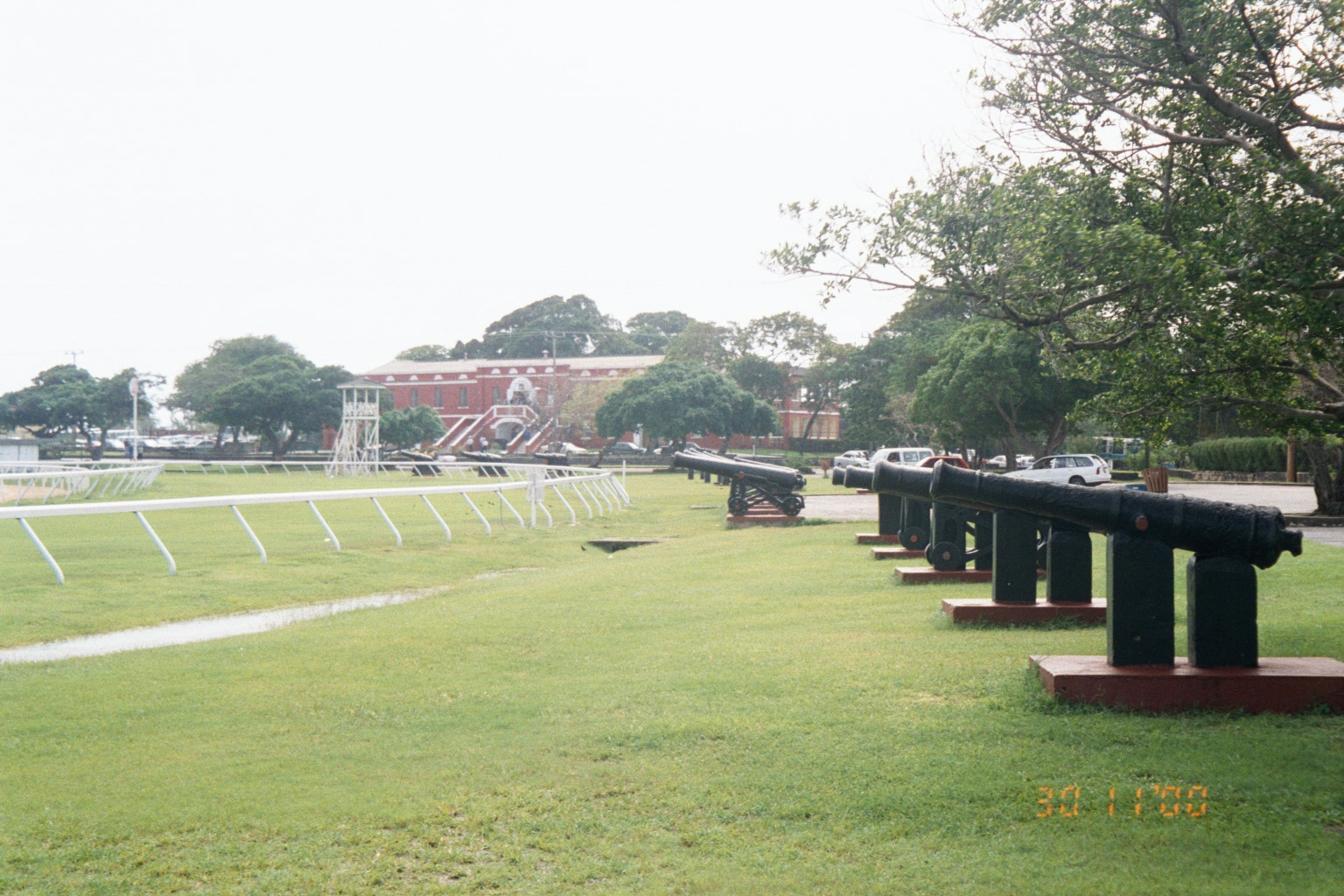
The Barbados National Cannon Collection, with some of the most rare and oldest English cannons

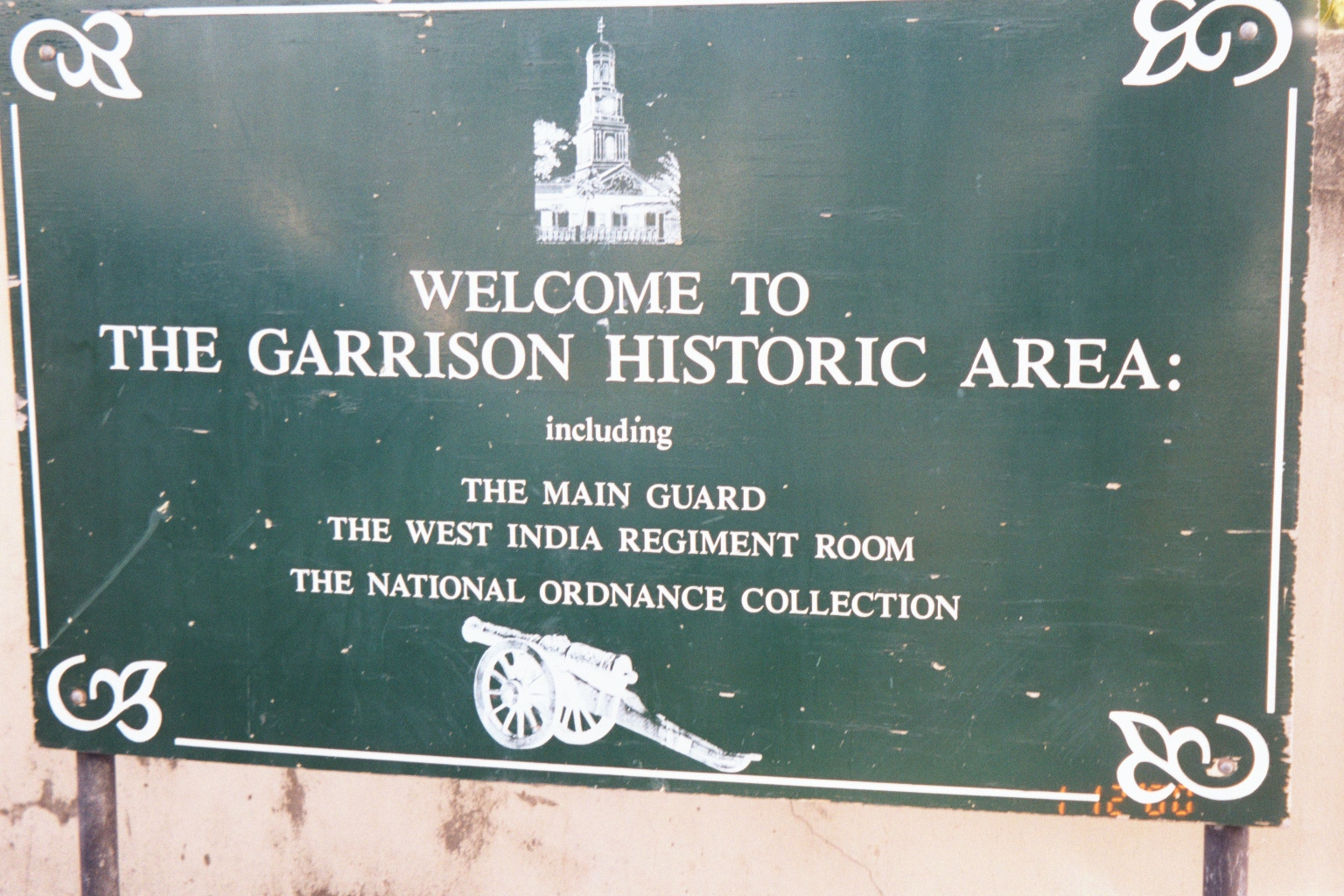
Garrison signage along Highway 7

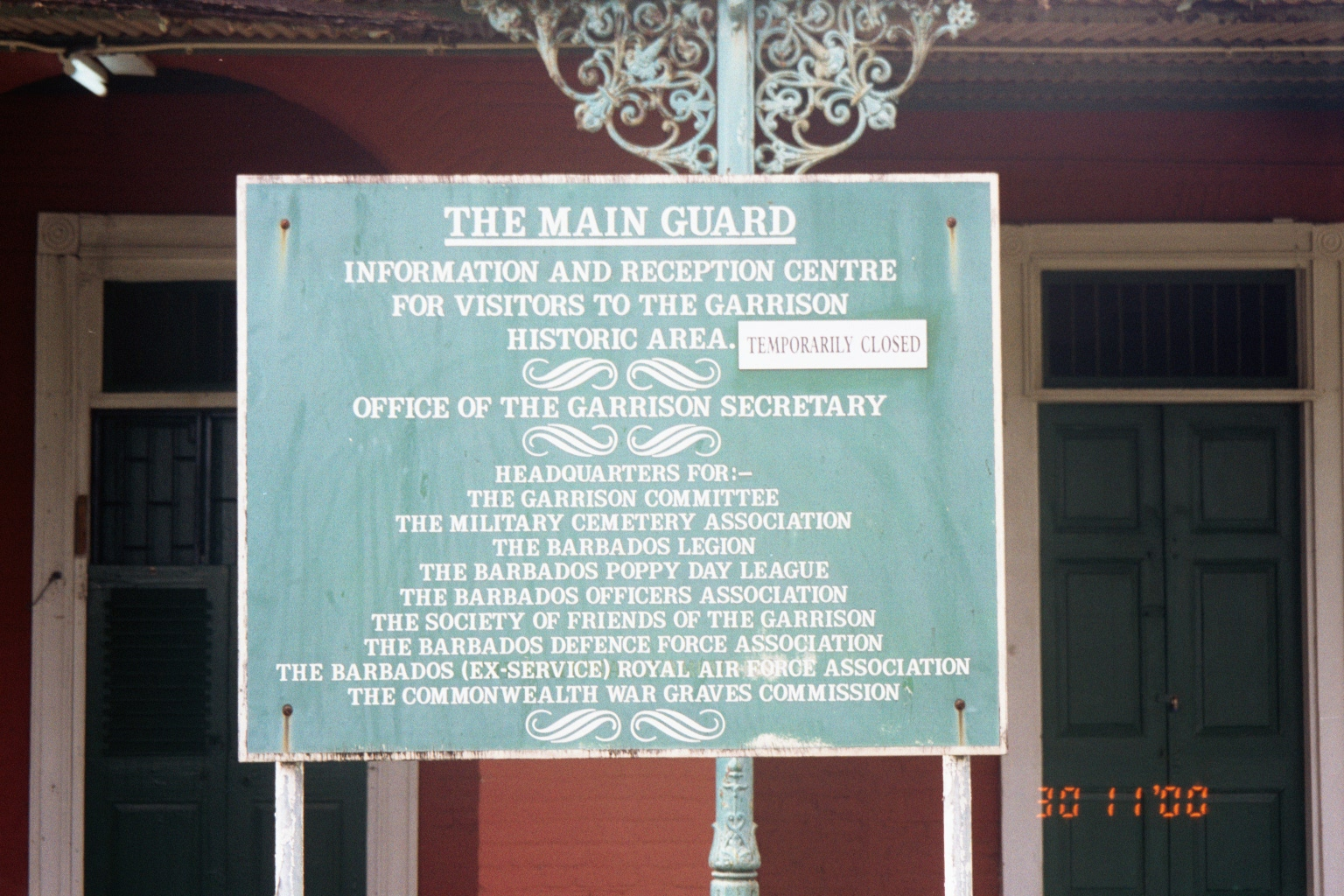
Sign on the main guard house at the Garrison Savannah

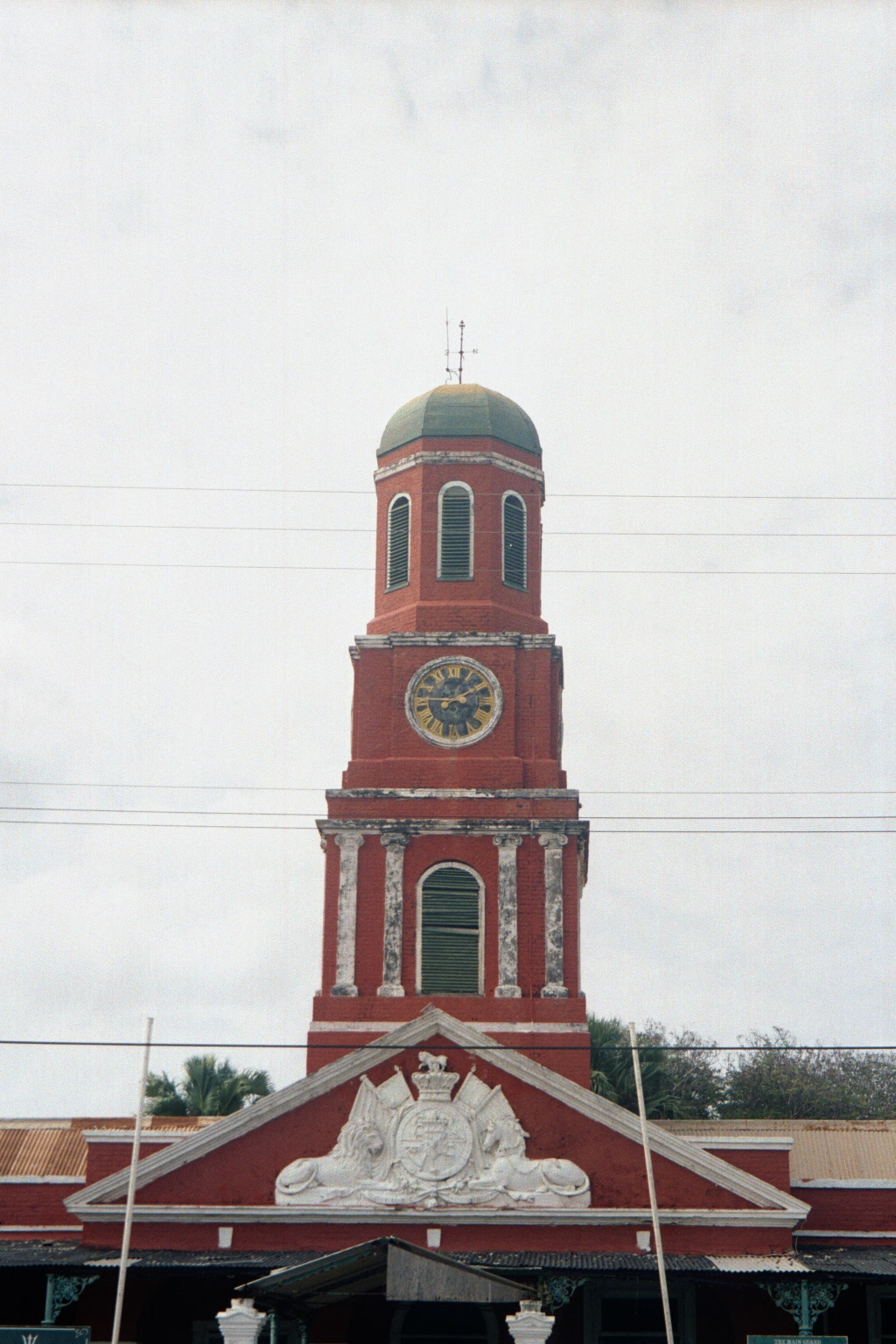
Clock tower on the main guardhouse at the Garrison Savannah, built around 1803

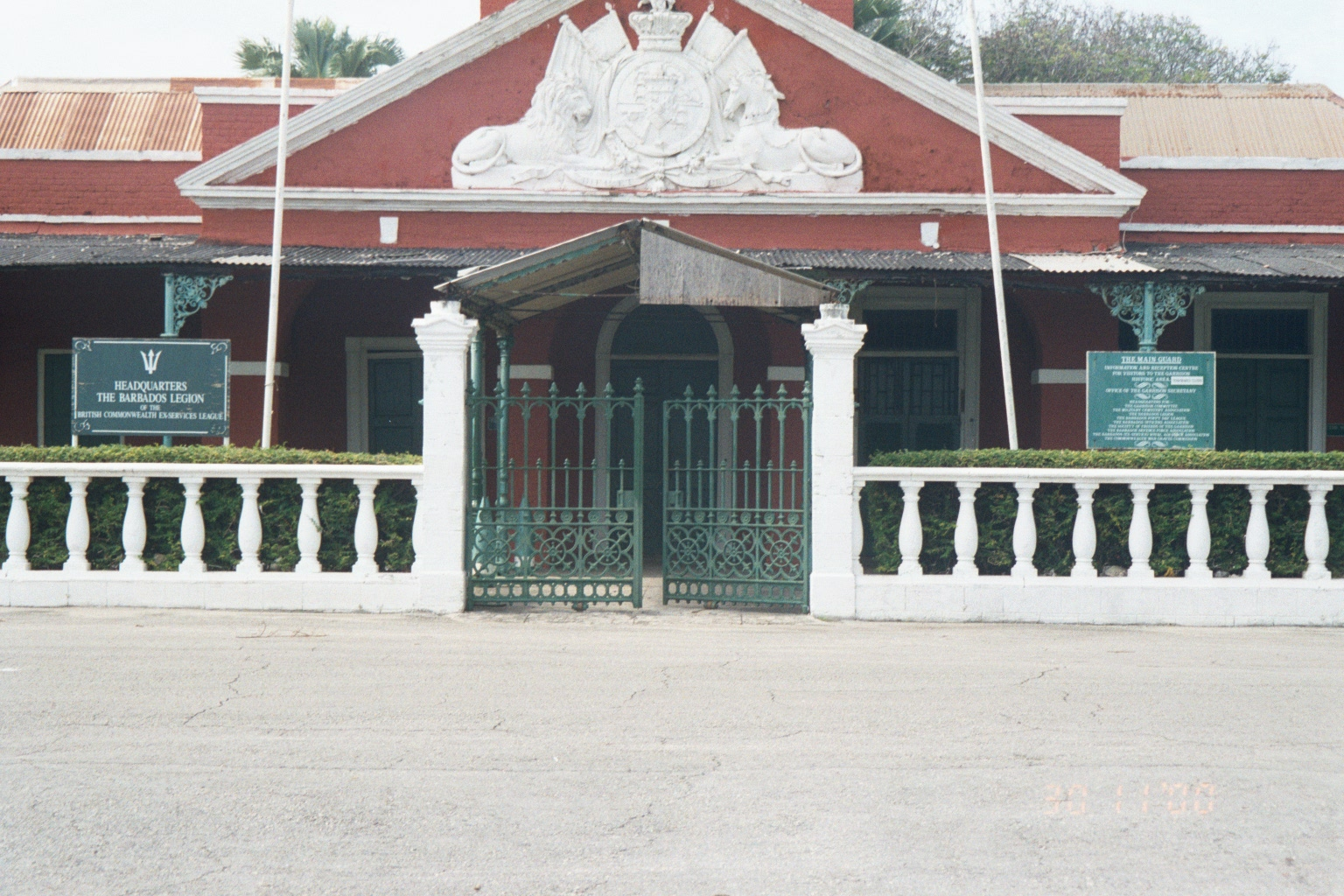
The main guardhouse building at the Garrison Savannah, built around 1803

== See also ==
- Barbados Defence Force
- Barbados Regiment
- Militia (British Dominions and Crown Colonies)
- West India Regiment
- Leeward Islands Station
- List of historic buildings in Bridgetown and Saint Ann's Garrison
