= TIMAK (Albania) =

Albanian vehicle company

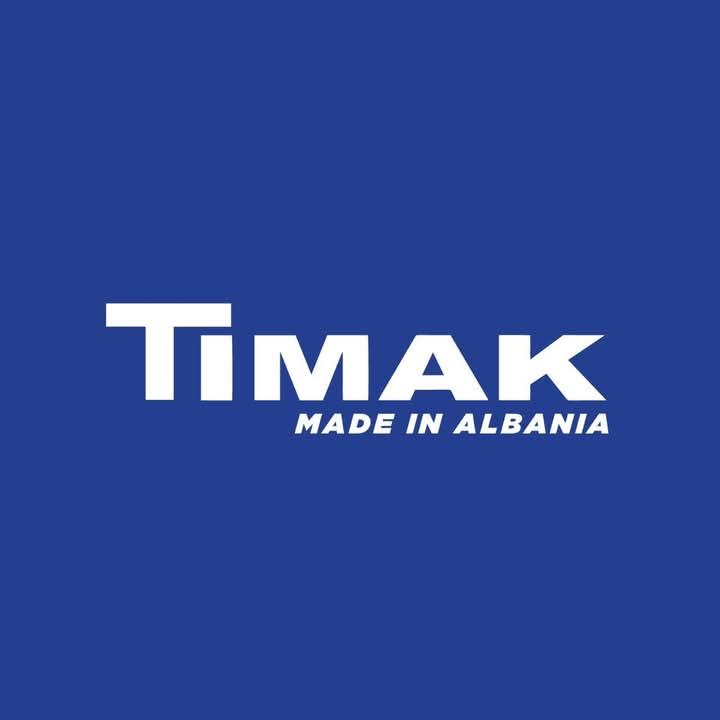
- Type: Private
- Founded: 2016
- Founder: Arjeta Puca
- Headquarters: Kashar, Albania
- Area served: Worldwide (20+ countries)
- Revenue: €5.2 million (2024)
- Net income: €1.35 million (2024, before tax)
- Owners: Arjeta Puca 51% Ron Yeffet 49%.
- Website: www.timak.com

TIMAK is an Albanian machinery and superstructure company, established in 2016. The company is headquartered in Tirana and it has delivered its products in over 20 countries.

Its main production line focuses in repurposing structure to produce police cars and ambulances. It later expanded its production into military vehicles, due to a need for protected military ambulances, including those for Ukraine.

In 2024, they introduced the first MRAP vehicle from Albania named SHOTA, which was developed by women engineers, using a Ford F-550 chassis.
