= Barbados Coast Guard =

- Founded: 1979
- Country: Barbados
- Type: Coast Guard
- Part of: Barbados Defence Force
- Mottos: Per Deo Per Mare (By God, By Sea)
- Website: Official website

Commanders
- Commander-in-Chief: Jeffrey Bostic, President of Barbados
- Commanding Officer: Commander Derrick Brathwaite
- Fleet Master Chief: Master Chief Petty Officer 1 Ryan Nurse

Insignia
- Naval and Coast Guard Ensign

The Barbados Coast Guard is the maritime element of the Barbados Defence Force. Its responsibilities include territorial defence, patrolling Barbados' territorial waters and Exclusive Economic Zone (EEZ), as well as conducting maritime law enforcement, counter-narcotic, search and rescue, fisheries and environmental protection and the enforcement of port & harbour regulations. The Barbados Coast Guard currently is based at its headquarters at BCGS PELICAN in Bridgetown, the capital of Barbados. The base consists of a partially enclosed base for the coast guard fleet to dock. It consists of a small fleet, including its flagship BCGS TRIDENT.

Before Barbados became a republic the usual styling of the Barbados Coast Guard was HMBS which stood for Her Majesty's Barbadian Ship. After republic status, vessels will now be known as Barbados Coast Guard Ship (BCGS).

The Marine division of the Barbados Police Service is co-located with the Barbados Coast Guard. Additionally, the Coast Guard base is home to the Barbados Cadet Corps Sea Cadets (the marine unit of the Barbados Cadet Corps).

BCGS PELICAN can be seen while travelling along the Spring Garden Highway in Barbados. This new base was commissioned in September 2007 and is an ultra-modern complex that caters to the maritime operational and training needs of the Barbados Defence Force and the other forces of the Regional Security System.

== Ships, boats and aircraft ==
The Barbados Coast Guard includes the following equipment:

- PO1 BCGS TRIDENT (Damen 4207 class offshore patrol vessel)
- PO2 BCGS LEONARD C. BANFIELD (Damen 4207 class offshore patrol vessel)
- PO3 BCGS RUDYARD LEWIS (Damen 4207 class offshore patrol vessel)
- PO4 BCGS Endeavor (SeaArk 40' Utility Boat)
- PO5 BCGS Enterprise (Damen 1204 class inshore patrol vessel)
- PO6 BCGS Excellence (Damen 1204 class inshore patrol vessel)
- PO7 BCGS Endurance (inshore patrol vessel)
- 2x Zodiac Hurricane 920 Rigid Hull Inflatable Boat (RHIB)
- 3x Damen MST 1200 Rigid Hull Inflatable Boat (RHIB)
- 3x Damen MST 1000 Rigid Hull Inflatable Boat (RHIB)

With the declaration of the Republic on 30 November 2021, HMBS was replaced as part of the removal of symbols of the monarchy with BCGS.

== New ships ==
In 2007 and 2008 the Coast Guard accepted delivery of three Damen Stan 4207 patrol vessels, the BCGS Leonard C Banfield, BCGS Rudyard Lewis and BCGS Trident.

Named after the Barbados Defence Force's (BDF) first chief-of-staff Colonel Leonard Banfield, the vessel docked at the BCGS Pelican, the Coast Guard's new headquarters on Spring Garden, St Michael, around 8 a.m. The Dutch vessel, built by Damen Group, now takes the Coast Guard's fleet to 11, including the 26-year-old flagship BCGS Trident. "This vessel is a significant addition to the Coast Guard's flotilla and it is expected that it will significantly assist in the safety and security of the waters around Barbados," said Commander Errington Shurland.

Both the Leonard C. Banfield and the new headquarters were commissioned in a ceremony on September 14, 2007. The new vessel is reported to cost about US$6 million (BDS$12 million).

Military sources said the delivery was the first in a US$37 million package that would include two other vessels of similar class, three 40-foot fast patrol boats, two 30-footers and three 21-foot in-shore patrol craft.

In terms of manpower, the Coast Guard, which now numbers 127 full-time personnel, would be increased at a rate of about 30 per year over the period 2007 to 2011.

== See also ==
- His/Her Majesty's Ship
