= Morant Point Lighthouse =

Lighthouse in Jamaica

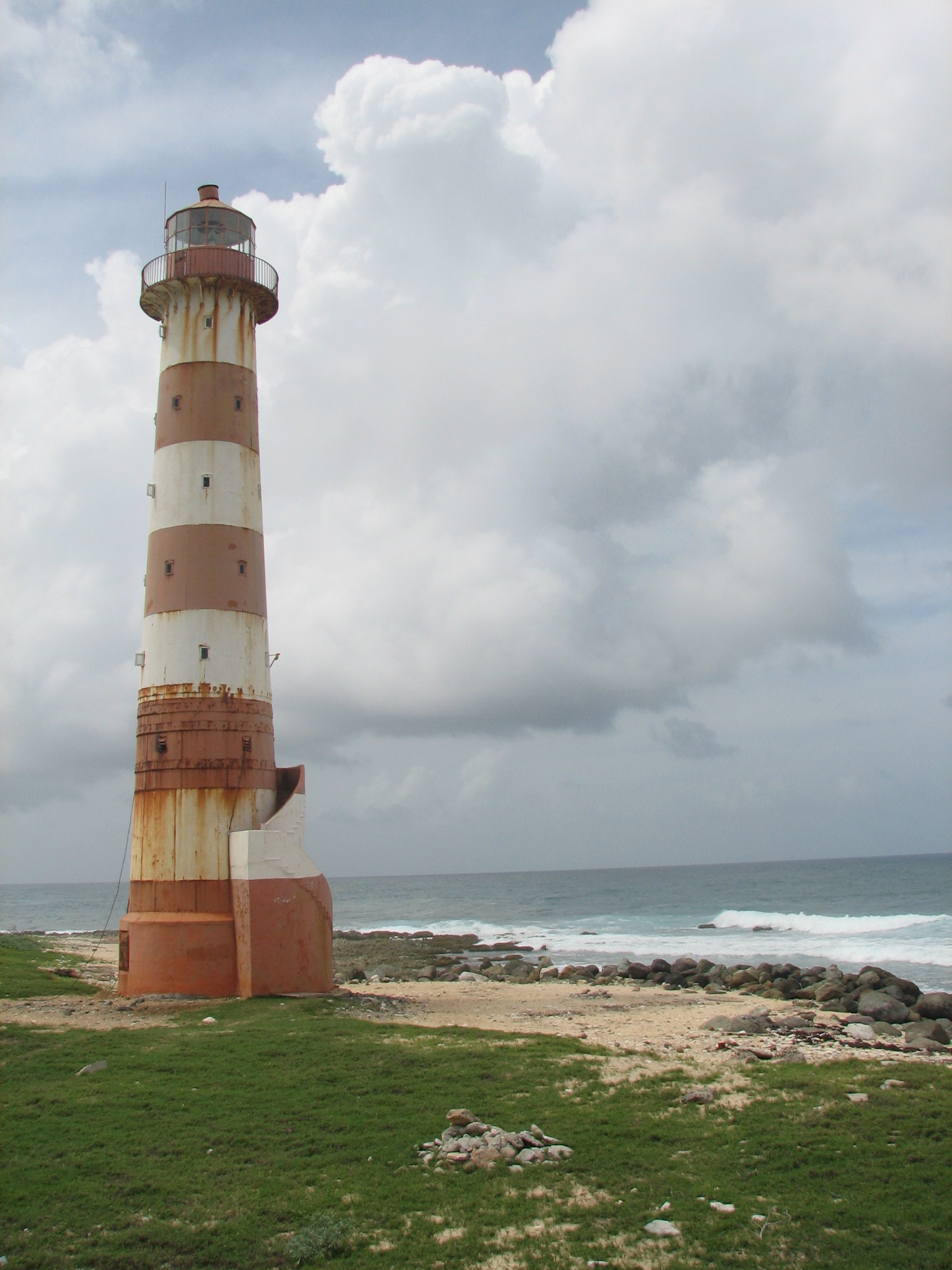
- Location: Morant Point; Saint Thomas; Jamaica
- Coordinates: 17.918452°N 76.184297°W

Tower
- Constructed: 1841
- Designed by: Alexander Gordon
- Built by: George Grove
- Foundation: concrete
- Construction: cast iron tower
- Height: 29 metres (95 ft)
- Shape: tapered cylindrical tower with balcony and lantern
- Markings: tower painted with red and white horizontal bands
- Heritage: national monument

Light
- First lit: 1841
- Focal height: 35 metres (115 ft)
- Range: 22 nmi (41 km; 25 mi)
- Characteristic: Fl (3) W 20s.

Morant Point Lighthouse is on the easternmost tip of Jamaica, and is the oldest lighthouse on the island.

== Description ==
Erected in 1841 by Kru men from Africa (who were among the free Africans brought to Jamaica in the period following emancipation), it is the oldest lighthouse on the island and the first cast iron lighthouse built in the Western Hemisphere.

It consists of a 30 m (100 ft) iron tube, cast in London in 1841, which has a diameter of 5 m (18 ft) at the base and 3 m (11 ft) at the cap with lantern and gallery, painted with red and white horizontal bands. To protect against surf during hurricanes, a semicircular masonry wall has been built around the seaward side of the base of the lighthouse.

It was designed by Alexander Gordon and built by George Grove, later a leading writer on music.

It is listed by the Jamaica National Heritage Trust as a historic monument, being "of considerable interest to historians of industrial technology".

It is maintained by the Port Authority of Jamaica, an agency of the Ministry of Transport and Mining.

== See also ==
- List of lighthouses in Jamaica

== Gallery ==
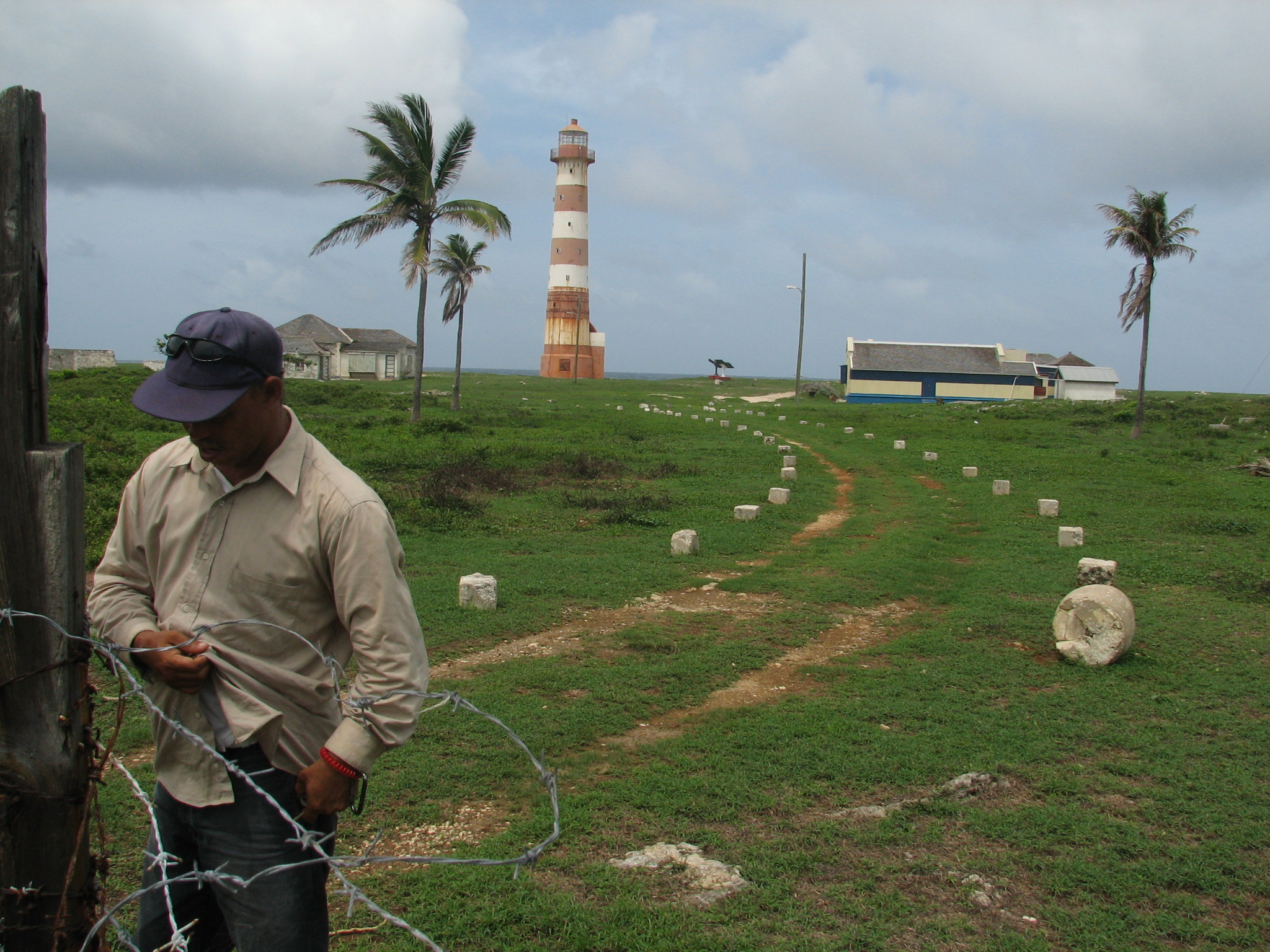

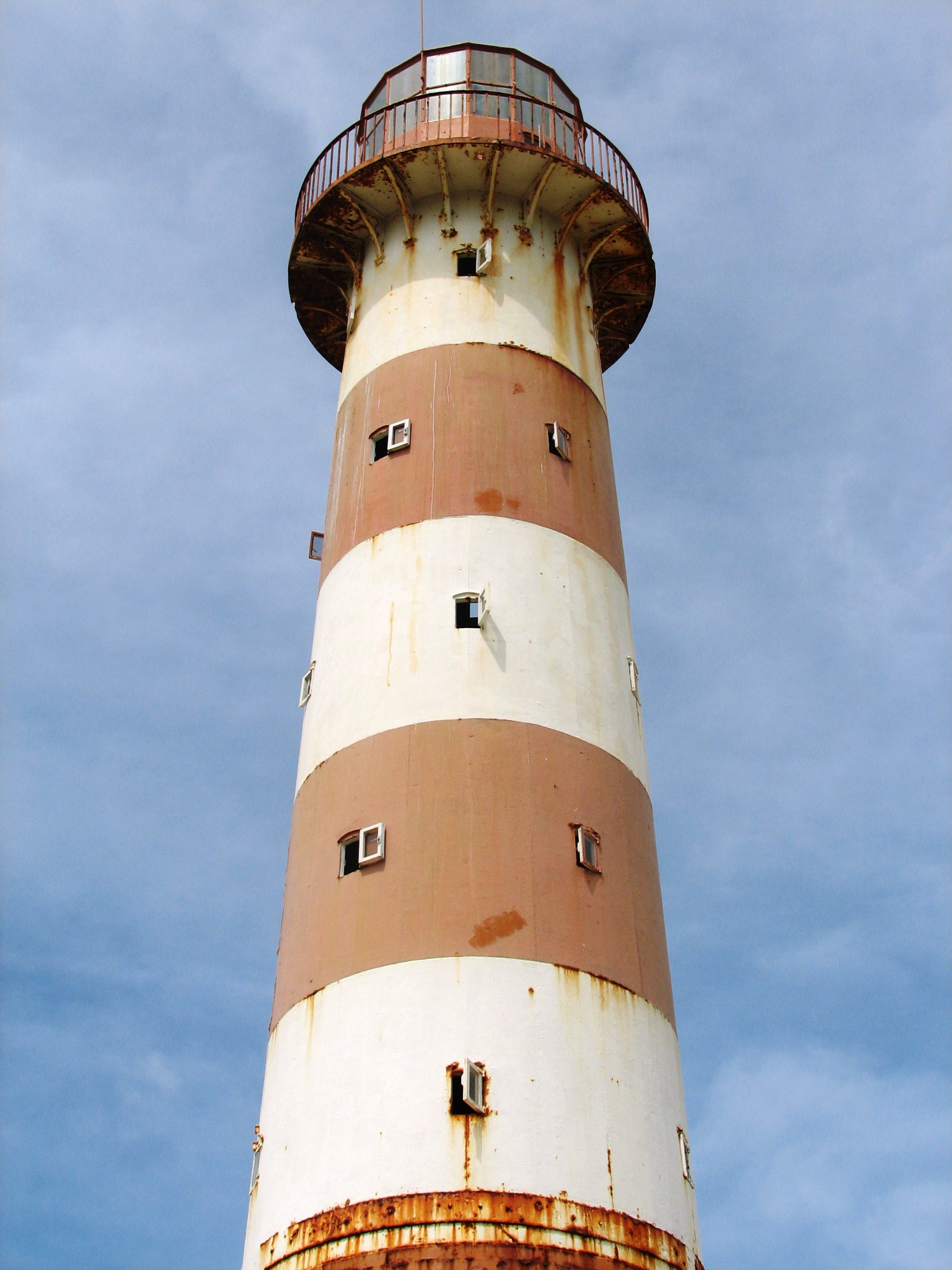
