= Peter Lorenzo Brady =

Peter Lorenzo Brady (born on January 2, 1945 in Kingston) is a retired Jamaican officer and Chief of Staff of the Jamaica Defence Force from 1990 to 1998.

== Life ==
Peter Brady was born on January 2, 1945, in Kingston, the son of Chief Steward Herbert Brady and his wife May. He attended St. Mary's College, Jamaica. After joining the Jamaica Defence Force (JDF), he completed his military and officer training at the Royal Canadian Infantry Corps Infantry School, the CAF Halifax, the Canadian Army Command and Staff College, and the Royal Naval College of the Royal Navy in the Royal Borough of Greenwich.

From 1970 to 1971, he commanded a ship in the Jamaica Coast Guard. After serving as deputy commander of the Support and Services Battalion until 1978, he commanded the JDF Coast Guard from 1978 to 1988, initially as a lieutenant commander, later as a commander. From 1988 to 1989, he was a naval advisor to the Port Authority of Jamaica, and then, until 1990, a colonel on the JDF General Staff. In 1990, he became the first Coast Guard officer to be appointed military commander of the Jamaica Defence Force. His rank was Rear Admiral. During his tenure, which lasted until 1998, the 1st Engineer Regiment was formed and the JDF participated in the multinational Operation Uphold Democracy in Haiti in 1994. On June 22, 2010, Brady was elected to chair the Standards of Training, Certification and Watchkeeping (STCW) Diplomatic Conference in Manila, Philippines.

Brady is, among other things, Director-General of the Maritime Authority of Jamaica (MAJ) of the Ministry of Transport, Works and Housing and a member of the Board of Directors of the Caribbean Maritime Institute (CMI).

== Personal life ==
On January 15, 1967, he married Carolyn Theresa Chung. The couple had a son and a daughter.

== Awards ==
- 1991: Commander of the Order of Distinction (CD)
- 1991: Aide-de-camp (ADC)
- 1994: Commander of the Royal Victorian Order (CVO)
- Legion of Merit
