= Antony Bertram Anderson =

Jamaica politician

His Excellency The Honourable Anthony Anderson OD CD

14th Jamaican Ambassador to the United States
- Incumbent
- Assumed office 8 May 2025
- Preceded by: Audrey Marks

Chief of Defence Staff
- In office 9 October 2010 – 1 December 2016
- Succeeded by: Rocky Meade

Personal details
- Born: Antony Bertram Anderson; November 20, 1963 (age 62) London, England
- Education: Royal Military College of Science; University of Technology

Military service
- Allegiance: Jamaica
- Branch/service: Jamaica Defence Force
- Years of service: 1991–2016
- Rank: Major General

His Excellency Major General (ret’d) Antony Bertram Anderson (born 20 November 1963) is a retired Jamaican military officer who served as the current Jamaican ambassador to the United States since 8 May 2025.

== Biography ==
Major General Anderson served as Jamaica’s first National Security Advisor and for six years, as the Chief of Defence Staff of the Jamaica Defence Force (JDF). Major General Anderson spent two years as the Deputy Chief of Defence Staff with responsibility for Force strategy, future plans and development; coordination of the National Security Strategy; and the implementation of the JDF's Strategic Defence Review (SDR). Anderson was Jamaica's first National Security Advisor to the Prime Minister and Cabinet from December 2016 to March 2018, and Chief of Defence Staff of the Jamaica Defence Force from October 2010 to November 2016.

He served as Commissioner of Police of the Jamaica Constabulary Force from March 2018 to March 2024.

In 2025, He was named as Jamaica's Ambassador to the United States of America.

In May 2026, it was announced that Anderson would become CEO of newly created, National Reconstruction and Resilience Authority (NaRRA), in Jamaica.

== Awards and honours ==
- Honorary Doctor of Technology, University of Technology, Jamaica (2024)
- Queen's Platinum Jubilee Medal (2022)
- Key to Broward County, Florida (2020)
- Key to the City of Lauderhill, Florida (2020)
- Induction into the U.S. Army Command and General Staff College International Hall of Fame (2017)
- Member of the Order of Distinction, Commander Class (2012)
- Queen's Diamond Jubilee Medal (2012)
- Member of the Order of Distinction, Officer Class (2009)
- Medal of Honour for Meritorious Service (2002)
