= Wemyss Gorman =

Wemyss Gorman or Wemyss-Gorman is a surname. Notable people with the surname include:

- Antonette Wemyss Gorman (born 1972 or 1973), Jamaican Chief of Defence Staff
- Nigel Patrick (1912-1981), British actor born Nigel Dennis Patrick Wemyss-Gorman
