= 1st Engineer Regiment =

1st Engineer Regiment may refer to:

- 1st Engineer Regiment (France)
- 1st Engineer Regiment (Italy)
- 1st Engineer Regiment (Jamaica)

== See also ==
- 1st Regiment (disambiguation)
