= Darren Jordon =

British/Jamaican journalist

Darren Jordon (born 23 November 1960 in London, England) is a British journalist working for the Al-Jazeera 24-hour English-language news and current affairs channel, Al Jazeera English. He is also a former officer of the Jamaica Defence Force.

== Early life ==
Born in London to Jamaican parents, Jordon was brought up in the West Indies.

Jordon was trained at the Royal Military Academy Sandhurst, in the United Kingdom, and became a professional army officer. He spent eight years in the Jamaica Regiment, and was part of the 1983 American-led force in the invasion of Grenada. He retired from the army as a captain.

Jordon became an accomplished military and sports parachutist, setting a new record in 1983 for parachuting onto Jamaica's highest mountain. Following his retirement from the army, he worked briefly as a parachute stunt double, appearing in the film Club Paradise.

Upon leaving the army, Jordon sold TV advertising, and was a group sales manager for Yorkshire Television, London Weekend Television, Granada Television with soap expert and TV critic Chris Stacey and M-Net in South Africa.

== Broadcasting career ==
Jordon started his media career as a sports broadcaster in South Africa.

He joined the BBC in 1998 as a BBC Sport correspondent on BBC News 24, where he later presented the Sportsday programme. He became a regular newsreader on the channel in 1999, before moving to present the relaunched breakfast news programme Breakfast in 2000, working with co-presenters Sophie Raworth, Jeremy Bowen and Sarah Montague. He also later became deputy presenter of the BBC One O'Clock News and presented all types of bulletins on BBC One.

Jordon left the BBC to join Al Jazeera at the end of October 2006, his departure having been announced on 5 October. In the announcement by Al Jazeera of his appointment, he was reported as saying "I think the world will benefit from a news channel like Al Jazeera English which will become the much needed channel of reference for Middle Eastern events with unique access to the region. We will set the news agenda rather than following others." He has become a regular newsreader based in Doha in Qatar.
