= Iyaric =

Dialect of English used by Rastafarians

- Dread Talk, Rasta Talk
- Native to: Jamaica
- Native speakers: 31,000 (liturgical language)
- Language family: English creole: Atlantic; Western; Jamaican Patois; Iyaric

Language codes
- ISO 639-3: –

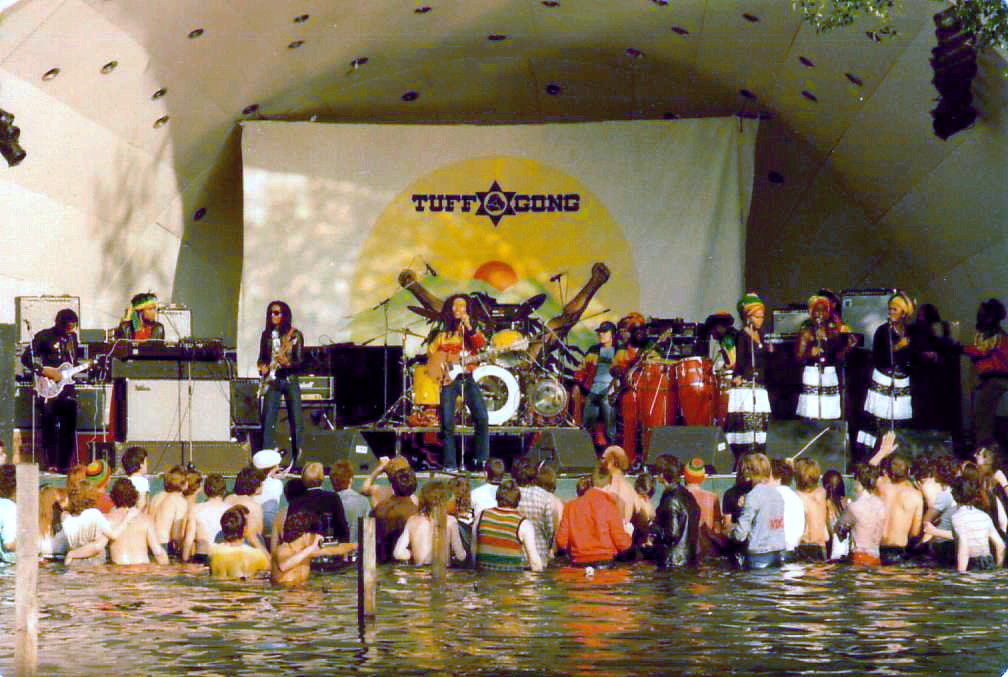
Bob Marley and The Wailers frequently spoke in Iyaric in both lyrics and conversations

Iyaric, also called Dread Talk or Rasta Talk, is a form of language constructed by members of the Rastafari movement through alteration of vocabulary. When Africans were taken into captivity as a part of the slave trade, English was imposed as a colonial language. In defiance, the Rastafari movement created a modified English vocabulary and dialect, with the aim of liberating their language from its history as a tool of colonial oppression. Iyaric sometimes also plays a liturgical role among Rastas, in addition to Amharic and Ge'ez.

== Features ==
=== Phonology ===
Iyaric shares phonological features with Jamaican Creole, with certain sounds, such as /a/, being stressed for the purpose of group identification distinct from Jamaican Creole. In 2015, Doctor of linguistics Havenol M. Schrenk adapted a phoneme inventory from the President Emeritus of the International Society for Pidgin and Creole Linguistics, Rocky Ricardo Meade, as follows:

Consonants
	Labial		Alveolar		Post-alveolar		Palatal		Velar	
Nasal		m		n				ɲ		ŋ
Stop	p	b	t	d	tʃ	dʒ	c	ɟ	k	ɡ
Fricative	f	v	s	z	ʃ					
Approximant/Lateral				ɹ				j		w
Approximant/Lateral				l						

Vowels
Letter	IPA
i	i
e	ɛ
a	a
o	o
u	u

=== Pronominal system ===
Iyaric's lexical departure from the pronominal system of Jamaican Patois is one of the dialect's defining features. Linguistics researcher Benjamin Slade comments that Jamaican Patois and Standard English pronoun forms are all acceptable in Iyaric, but speakers almost always use the I-form of first-person pronouns, while I-form usage for second-person pronouns is less frequent. He details his findings in the table below:

Pronominal forms in English, Jamaican Patois, and Iyaric
	Standard English	Jamaican Patois	Iyaric
1sg	I / me / my	mi	I, Iman, (I and I)* ...
2sg	you / your	yu	de I, de Iman (thy) ...
3sg	he, she, it / him, her, it / his, her, its	im, (i, shi, ar)	(im, i, shi) ...
1pl	we / us / our	wi	I and I, (I, we) ...
2pl	you (all) / your	yu, unu	de Is, (unu) ...
3pl	they / them / their	dem	(dem, dey) ...
*Forms in brackets are less common

== Vocabulary ==
Some Rastas avoid using certain words in the English language because they contain phonetic sounds that invoke negative connotations. Iyaric vocabulary developed in response to this, resulting in a dialect that challenged the negative colonial framework Rastas perceive in Jamaica's vernacular English.

=== Morphology ===
The base word forms for Iyaric are imported from Jamaican Creole, and the constituent phonemes for those words are analyzed for positive or negative connotation against an English lexifier. Words whose phonetic connotations conflict with the word's overall semantics are called the "Babylon" (colonial English) form of the word, and Iyaric uses a system called "Iformation" ("I" + transformation) to substitute those incongruously connoted phonetic matches with new phonemes that match the connotation of the overall word. This process of phono-semantic matching results in a lexicon containing only Zionic word forms, which exclude negative phonemes from positive words and positive phonemes from negatively connoted words.

The purpose for favoring Zionic word forms over Babylonic word forms is to influence the speaker's cognition through the structure of the dialect, with the intent to challenge colonial biases that may be inherent in the structures of English.

For example, the word "hello" is not used because they see it as containing phonetic matches for the negatively connoted English words "hell" and "low". Instead, expressions such as 'wa gwaan', 'yes I' and 'cool nuh lyah' (or 'cool alyuh'. 'alyuh'-all of you) are used because they uplift people. If at a Rastafari church, they would use their formal church greetings. For instance, the Rastafari branch known as the Twelve Tribes of Israel would say, "Greetings in that Most Precious and Divine Name of Our Lord and Saviour Jesus Christ, who has revealed Himself through the wonderful personality of H.I.M. Emperor Haile Selassie the 1st of Ethiopia".

=== I words ===
- I replaces "me", which is much more commonly used in Jamaican English than in the more conventional forms. Me is felt to turn the person into an object whereas I emphasises the subjectivity of an individual.
- I and I (also spelled I&I, InI, I-n-I or Ihi yahnh Ihi) is a complex term, referring to the oneness of Jah (God) and every human. As quoted by Rastafari scholar E. E. Cashmore: "I and I is an expression to totalise the concept of oneness. . . When he's addressing a brethren as himself, he says "I am I" — as being the oneness of two persons. So God is within all of us and we're one people in fact." He continues: "I and I means that God is in all men. The bond of Ras Tafari is the bond of God, of man." The term is often used in place of "you and I" or "we" among Rastafari, implying that both persons are united under the love of Jah. Also in the Twi language (in which patois uses a lot of Twi loan words) of Ghana, Me ne me is also said, which literally translates to "I and I".
- I-tal or Di food fula itality is spiritually blessed food that has not touched modern chemicals and is served without preservatives, condiments or salts. Alcohol, coffee, milk, and flavoured beverages are generally viewed as not I-tal. Most Rastas follow the I-tal proscriptions generally, and many are vegetarians or vegans. Even meat-eating Rastas abstain from eating pork, as pigs are scavengers of the dead, as are crabs, lobsters, and shrimp (whose banning coincides with the restrictions of Kashrut).
- I man is the inner person within each Rastafari believer.
- Irie refers to positive emotions or feelings, or anything that is good. Specifically it refers to high emotions and peaceful vibrations. This is a phonetical representation of "all right".
- Ites derived from English "heights", means "joy" and also the colour "red". It can also be short for "Israelites".
- Itesquake replaces "earthquake".
- Irator replaces "creator", and Iration replaces "creation".
- Idren or Bredren and Sistren refer to the oneness of Rastafari and are used to describe one's peers (male – "bredren", female – "sistren").
- Itinually replaces continually. It has the everlasting/everliving sense of I existing continuously.
- Inity replaces "unity", demonstrating a general pattern of replacing "you" and similar sounds with "I".
- Iya (higher): Rastafari vocabulary is full of references to the "iya man", "stepping higher and higher", etc. It is a reference to stepping into higher realms of reality, as in higher awareness. Iya is also used to refer to a friend. As in "Yes Iya", or "Cool (no) Iya".
- Iyaric is the self-applied term for Rastafari language. It is formed by a combination of Iya (higher) and Amharic, the language spoken by Haile Selassie I. Other terms for Iyaric include I-talk, Livalect, and Wordsound.
- Iwa replaces "time" or more accurately, "hour": "Inna this ya iwa."

=== Other words ===
- Dreadlocks describes the locks commonly worn among Rastas, now universally called dreadlocks in English. The 'dread' component refers to the fear of the Lord, as well as the fear inspired when Rastas first began to grow locks in the 1940s in Jamaica. To Rastas, dreadlocks can be a deeply spiritual part of their identity. The Nazirite vow in the Torah and the story of Samson are commonly cited: "And she made a vow, saying, 'O LORD Almighty, if you will only look upon your servant's misery and remember me, and not forget your servant but give her a son, then I will give him to the LORD for all the days of his life, and no razor will ever be used on his head'." 1 Samuel 1:11. Rastas see this as the most natural way to grow one's hair, as well as a symbol of defiance of Rome and Babylon.
- Dreads can refer to the dreadlocks, or to those who wear them. Because the latter sense of the word is a synonym for "Rasta", Iyaric is often called Dread Talk, as evidenced in the body of research by Jamaican linguistics scholar Velma Pollard.
- Persons without dreads are sometimes called baldheads (somewhat derisive) or lack (more respectful); however as a common Rasta refrain points out, "It's not the dread upon your head, but the love in your heart that makes you Rasta..." meaning that many Rasta faithful themselves lack dreadlocks, while some non-Rastas, wolves inna sheeps clothes, may wear dreads solely for fashion. Dreads that were induced artificially or with additives, rather than allowed to take their natural course, are known as bathroom locks.
- Babylon is an important Rastafari term, referring to governments and institutions that are seen as in rebellion against the will of Jah (God). The etymology of the word is rooted in the story of the Tower of Babel, which is a Biblical origin story explaining the reasons why different cultures of the world speak different languages. In it, the Babylonians were an advanced civilisation who were constructing a tall tower, with the intentions of reaching the heavens. However, God intervened by confounding their speech, so that they could no longer communicate to each other, and subsequently could no longer construct the tower. This would have been an especially important story to the early Rastas, who all came from vastly different cultures and spoke different languages. This may also have given the early Rastas a sense of pride in their own dialect of the English language, which at the time was considered to be "broken English"; it is now officially recognised as Jamaican Patois. Babylon is further used by some to mean specifically the racist European tyrants who had oppressed black people for centuries through slavery, and people of colour through the system of indentured servitude. It has gone on to also refer to corrupt members of government, or "politricksters" who continue to oppress the poor, regardless of race. Historically, the term Babylon may have been used to refer to the Roman Empire, who were pagans, and were known to scrutinise the early Christians and were also the ones who crucified Yeshua. This relation was reinforced after the 1935 Italian invasion of Ethiopia, then ruled by Rastafari's 'Living God', Haile Selassie I, and also partly because the Roman Catholic church, as an institution, was considered an opponent of Selassie I, and thus also of Rastafari. Babylon is also sometimes used by some Rastas with the more specific meaning of "police", insofar as they are seen as executive agents of Babylon's will. In a more general sense, it is used to refer to the powers that be, any system that oppresses or discriminates against any peoples.
- Politricks is a Rasta term replacing English "politics", because so many politicians, etc. turn out, they say, to be more like tricksters. Politrickster n.
- Everliving replaces "everlasting", particularly in the context of Life Everliving. The "last" in "everlasting", although actually implying survival (to "last" is to "survive" or "bide through"), is seen by the Rastas as implicative of an end (as in the term "at last"), and as the life the Rastas have will never end according to them, they being immortalists. Often used in the phrase "I and I is Everliving, Everfaithful, Eversure. Ras Tafari."
- H.I.M. (His Imperial Majesty), pronounced him, and referring to Haile Selassie I.
- Downpression replaces "oppression", because oppression holds man down instead of keeping him up (pronounced op in Jamaican patois.) Similarly "downgression" = "violence" (from aggression). Downpressor n.
- Livication replaces "dedication", to rid itself of a connotation of death. adj. Livicated. v. Livicate.
- Outvention replaces "invention", because mechanical devices are seen as outward; it is the inner experience of being Rastafari that is invention.
- Overstanding (also "innerstanding") replaces "understanding", referring to enlightenment that raises one's consciousness.
- Apprecilove replaces "appreciate" because of the similarity to hate.
- Amagideon/Gideon is a Rasta theological concept meaning the general state the entire world is in now, and has been getting progressively deeper in since 1930, and especially since 1974. This is a slight mutation of Armageddon, a name appearing in Revelation.
- Zion refers to either Ethiopia or the whole continent of Africa, after the Day of Judgment, as well as a state of mind one can enter through Rastafari.
- Know replaces "believe". Rastafari would not say they "believe" Haile Selassie is Jah and that they, the Rastas, are the chosen people. They would say they "know" these things.
- Wordsound is a name for Iyaric derived from the Rastafari principle of "Word, Sound and Power", which several scholars have compared to West African concepts regarding a power or essence being encapsulated within the pronounced sound of a name or word.
- Whore of Babylon is the Revelation character sometimes considered to be Queen Elizabeth II, who was the Head of State of Jamaica; or the papacy; or both.

== Popular impact ==
The earliest origin of Iyaric is debated, though it is generally agreed that the dialect was deliberately created by Rastas as an argot. Despite the dialect's secretive beginnings, Iyaric words and meaning have migrated outside of Rasta communities into wider usage around the globe through reggae music and media. The term dreadlocks, for example, is used worldwide for the hairstyle that was popularized by the Rastafari movement. Rastafari metaphors like Zion and Babylon, as well as the Iyaric words "overstand" and "politricks" have entered hip hop culture through Caribbean-American and Caribbean-British rappers/musicians. In Europe, perhaps influenced by popular culture depictions of or actual encounters with Afro-Caribbean "rude boy" gangs, the term Babylon is sometimes used to refer to the police.

== See also ==
- Language and thought
- Linguistic determinism
- Linguistic relativity
- Phono-semantic matching
