= Paul Edwin Crook =

Paul Edwin Crook CBE DSO (19 April 1915 – 20 October 2004) was a British Brigadier who was the first Chief of Staff of the Jamaica Defence Force from 31 July 1962 to 1965.

== Early life and education ==
Paul Edwin Crook was born to Herbert and Christine Crook in Croydon. He attended Uppingham School, a public school, and studied classics and law at Emmanuel College, Cambridge.

== Military career ==
He was commissioned a second lieutenant in the Queen's Own Royal West Kent Regiment (QORWK) in 1935 and served as a platoon commander in Karachi, British India. He served in Palestine for two years during the Arab Revolt.

At the beginning of the Second World War, he served as adjutant of the QORWK regimental depot. During the war, he saw action in Normandy, Burma, and Singapore . From 1942 to 1944, he served at the British Army headquarters in North Africa, and then until 1945 as a brigadier major in the 147th Infantry Brigade of the Territorial Army. From 1945 to 1946, he was Chief Civil Affairs Officer in the Dutch East Indies with the temporary rank of Colonel. After a posting as an instructor at Staff College, Camberley, he was reassigned to the QORWK, served in the Malay Union during the Malay resistance, and then in the British occupation zone in Germany. From 1954 to 1957, he commanded the 3rd Battalion, Parachute Regiment, which, among other things, parachuted over El Gamil Airfield near Port Said on November 5, 1956, during the Suez Crisis, as part of Operation Musketeer, suffering only minor losses despite fierce resistance.

From 1959 to 1962, he was Colonel Commandant of the Army Air Transport Training and Development Centre. He then became the first Chief of Staff of the newly formed Jamaica Defence Force of the newly independent Jamaica on July 31, 1962, by which time he held the rank of Brigadier. In 1965, he was transferred to Aden, where he served as Military Security Advisor to the High Commissioner to the Aden Protectorate until 1967. In 1968, he was transferred to a command post in the British Army of the Rhine. He retired in 1971.

== Retirement ==
From 1974 to 1979, Crook served as an honorary colonel in the 16th (Volunteer) Independent Parachute Company of the British Parachute Regiment, stationed in Lincoln, as a member of the Army Volunteer Reserve. From 1979 to 1983, he served in the 15th (King's) Parachute Battalion, and from 1984 to 1985 in the 4th (Volunteer) Parachute Battalion of the regiment. He also served as chairman of the Lincoln County Scouts from 1975 to 1988.

Crook was married twice: first to Joan Lewis from 1944 to 1967, and second to Betty Wyles from 1967 onwards. He had one daughter from his first marriage and one stepson from his second. he died on 20 October 2004 in Devon.

== Awards ==
- 1945: Bronze Star Medal
- 1946 Member of the Order of the British Empire (MBE)
- 1957: Distinguished Service Order (DSO)
- 1964–1967: Aide-de-camp of Queen Elizabeth II
- 1965: Commander of the Order of the British Empire (CBE)
