= Chief of Defence Staff (Jamaica) =

Professional head of the Jamaica Defence Force

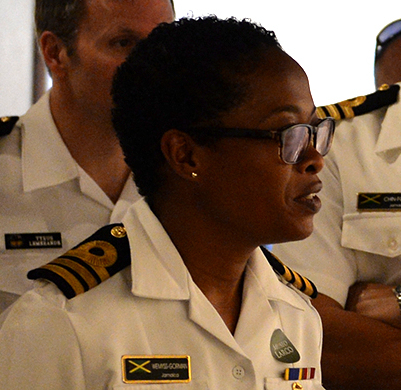
- Incumbent; Rear Admiral Antonette Wemyss Gorman since 21 January 2022
- Appointer: Prime Minister
- Formation: 31 July 1962
- First holder: Paul Edwin Crook
- Website: Official website

The Chief of Defence Staff is the professional head of the Jamaica Defence Force. They are responsible for the administration and the operational control of the Jamaican military. It is the highest ranked military position in the country.

== JDF Chiefs ==
=== Chiefs of Staff (1962–2007) ===
No.	Picture	Chief of Staff	Took office	Left office	Time in office	Ref.
1	Paul CrookCBE DSO	Brigadier; Paul Crook; CBE DSO (1915–2004)	31 July 1962	1965	2–3 years	
2	David Hartman Smith	Brigadier; David Hartman Smith	1965	1973	7–8 years	
3	Dunstan Fitzgerald RobinsonCD OBE ED JP	Brigadier; Dunstan Fitzgerald Robinson; CD OBE ED JP (born 1944)	1973	1973	0 years	
4	Rudolph Edward George GreenCD OStJ JP	Major General; Rudolph Edward George Green; CD OStJ JP	1973	1979	5–6 years	
5	Robert James NeishCD AFC ADC JP	Major General; Robert James Neish; CD AFC ADC JP	1979	1990	10–11 years	
6	Peter Lorenzo BradyCD CVO ADC JP	Rear Admiral; Peter Lorenzo Brady; CD CVO ADC JP	1990	1998	7–8 years	
7	John I Simmonds	Major General; John I Simmonds	1998	2002	3–4 years	
8	Hardley M Lewin	Rear Admiral; Hardley M Lewin	2002	2007	4–5 years	
9	Stewart Emerson Saunders	Major General; Stewart Emerson Saunders	2007	2007	0 years	

In December 2007 the title of Chief of Staff was replaced by Chief of Defence Staff and filled by an incumbent.

=== Chiefs of Defence Staff (2008–present) ===
No.	Picture	Chief of Defence Staff	Took office	Left office	Time in office	Ref.
1	Stewart Emerson Saunders	Major General; Stewart Emerson Saunders	2008	9 October 2010	1–2 years	
2	Antony Bertram Anderson	Major General; Antony Bertram Anderson	9 October 2010	1 December 2016	6 years	
3	Rocky Ricardo Meade	Lieutenant General; Rocky Ricardo Meade (born 1963)	1 December 2016	21 January 2022	9 years	
4	Antonette Wemyss Gorman	Rear Admiral; Antonette Wemyss Gorman (born 1972 or 1973)	21 January 2022	Incumbent	4 years	
