= Antonette Wemyss Gorman =

Jamaican military officer

The Honourable Dr. Antonette Wemyss Gorman OD CD BSc
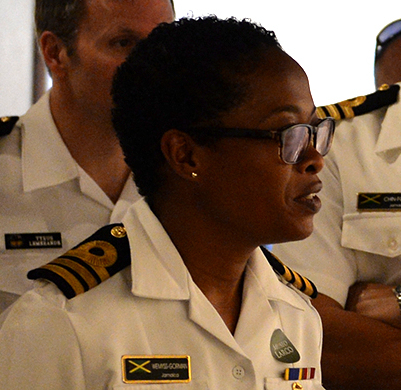
- Wemyss Gorman in 2017
- Born: 1972 or 1973 (age 53–54); Jamaica
- Education: Naval War College; University of the West Indies
- Children: 1
- Military career
- Allegiance: Jamaica
- Branch: Jamaica Defence Force; Jamaica Defence Force Coast Guard
- Service years: 1992–present
- Rank: Vice Admiral
- Unit: HMJS Paul Bogle
- Commands: Chief of Defence Staff
- Awards: Order of Distinction (Commander Class); Medal of Honour for Meritorious Service; Medal of Honour for General Service; Medal of Honour for Long Service and Good Conduct; Military Commendation Medal; Queen Elizabeth II Diamond Jubilee Medal; Queen Elizabeth II Platinum Jubilee Medal

Vice Admiral Antonette Sandra-Lee Wemyss Gorman CD (born 1972 or 1973) is a Jamaican military officer serving as the chief of defence staff of the Jamaica Defence Force; which is the highest ranked military position in the country; she also holds the rank of vice admiral. She is the first female chief of staff in Jamaica, and was also the first female officer to serve at sea, and the first woman to reach the rank of commander in the JDF. Her seagoing appointment was the first appointment of a woman to a front line combat role in the Caribbean.

== Career ==
Prior to her military career, from 1990 Wemyss Gorman worked two years at Cable & Wireless.

In 1992, at the age of 19, she enlisted into the Jamaica Defence Force (JDF). She completed her initial officer training at the UK Britannia Royal Naval College. Between 1994 and 1997, she was navigating officer on the HMJS Paul Bogle. She became the first woman officer to go to sea in the Jamaica Coast Guard. Her seagoing appointment was also the first appointment of a woman to a front line combat role in the Caribbean.

She served fifteen years aboard ships in the Jamaica Coast Guard. In addition to command of ships, she was Operations Officer and Officer Commanding Shore Base, Second in Command of the JDF Air wing, and prior to her appointment as JDF chief of staff, she was Commanding Officer of the JDF Coast Guard. She was the first woman to reach the rank of commander in the JDF. She was responsible for the founding of the Caribbean Military Maritime Training Centre. She was promoted to rear admiral when she was designated as chief of defence staff.

In parallel to serving in the military, she also filled civilian roles. In 1998, as a secondment for two years, she was appointed Deputy Director for Marine Transport in the Ministry of Transport and Works. She also served on the Fisheries Advisory Board, and on the National COVID-19 Response Advisory Committee.

She is an alumna of the US Naval War College, and received a master's in National Security and Strategic Studies from the University of the West Indies.

== Honours ==
Wemyss Gorman has been awarded numerous honours for her services in the military including the Order of Distinction (Commander Class), the Medal of Honour for both Meritorious Service and General Service, the Military Commendation Medal, and both the Queen Elizabeth II Diamond Jubilee Medal and Queen Elizabeth II Platinum Jubilee Medal.

== Personal ==
Wemyss Gorman was born in 1972 or 1973. She has a son and is married to Jonathan Wemyss Gorman. She enjoys gardening as a hobby. She was raised by her grandparents in Top Alston, Clarendon. She studied at Knox Preparatory School and Knox College.
