= Rocky Ricardo Meade =

Jamaican lieutenant general

His Excellency The Honourable Rocky Meade CD JP PhD
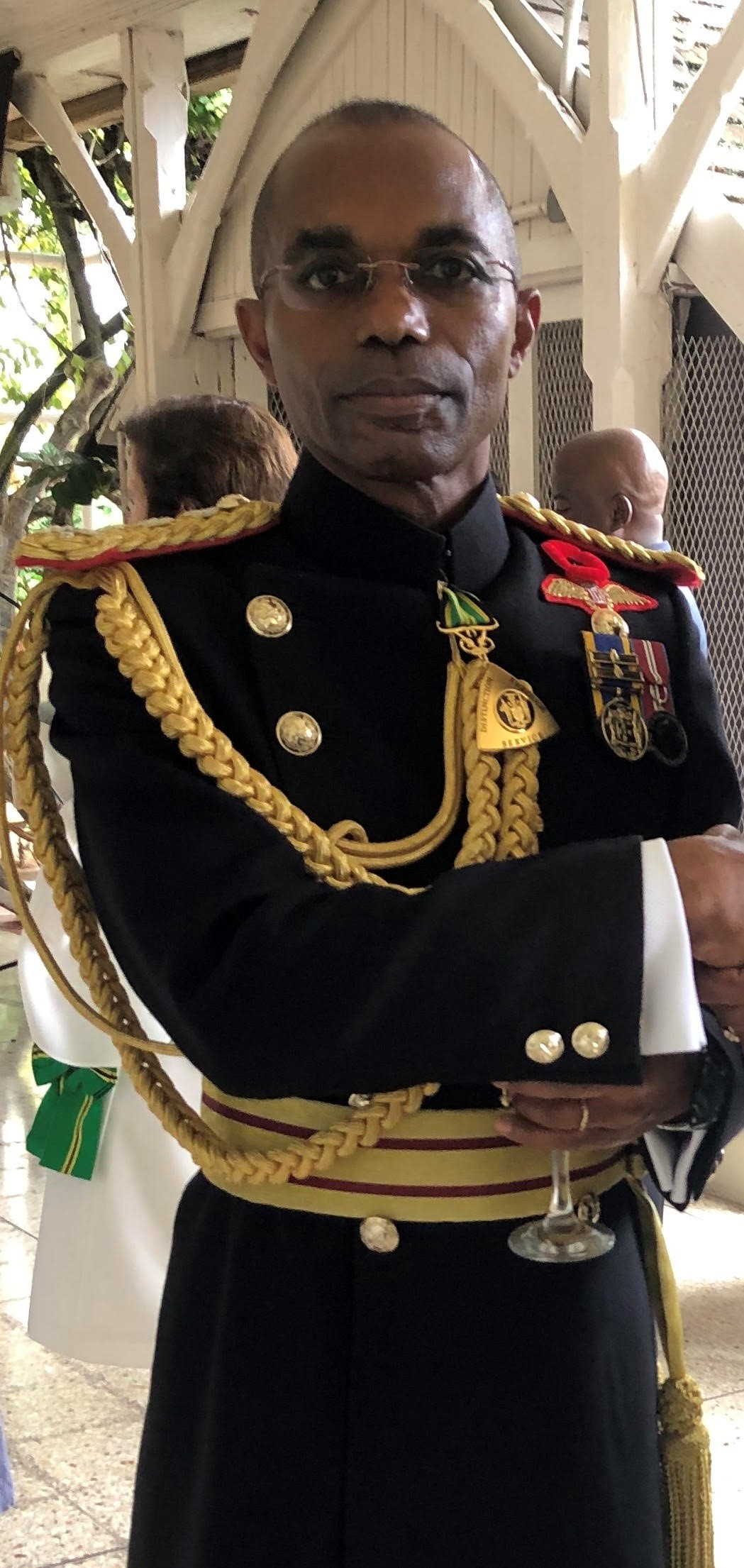
- Meade during the Hero's Day celebrations in 2019.
- Born: Rocky Ricardo Meade; 1963 (age 62–63); Jamaica
- Alma mater: Wolmer's School; The University of the West Indies (BA, MA); USACSC; University of Amsterdam
- Military career
- Allegiance: Jamaica
- Branch: Jamaica Defence Force
- Service years: 1984–2022
- Rank: Lieutenant General
- Units: Jamaica Regiment; Jamaica Combined Cadet Force
- Commands: Chief of Defence Staff; Deputy Chief of Defence Staff
- Awards: Order of Distinction (CD); Medal of Honour for Meritorious Service; Military Commendation Medal; Queen Elizabeth II Diamond Jubilee Medal; Queen Elizabeth II Platinum Jubilee Medal
- Other work

Permanent Secretary in the Office of the Prime Minister
- Incumbent
- Assumed office 20 September 2022

Rocky Ricardo Meade is a Jamaican military leader who was the third Chief of Defence Staff (CDS) of the Jamaica Defence Force (JDF), serving from December 2016 to January 2022.

== Military service ==
Meade joined the Jamaica Defence Force (JDF) in 1984. Meade was integral in the conceptualization and implementation of the Jamaica National Service Corps Meade has served as Chair of CARICOM Military Chiefs, the Governance Committees of the University of Technology and HEART Trust National Training Agency; Chair of the Private Sector Organization of Jamaica's Crime Strategy Committee, Vice President of the Royal Air Forces Association Jamaica 580 Branch, Vice President of the Jamaica Legion, Chair of the Jamaica Combined Cadet Force Committee, President Emeritus of the International Society for Pidgin and Creole Linguistics, Chair of the Editorial Board of the Society for Caribbean Linguistics and Committee Chair of the Linguistic Society of America.

== Public service ==
On September 13, 2022, Meade was appointed Cabinet Secretary and Head of the Public Service. Meade will succeed Ambassador Douglas Saunders, who will step down on October 1, 2022. On September 14, 2022, Meade declined Cabinet Secretary appointment amid controversy.

On February 13, 2023, Meade was appointed Ambassador Plenipotentiary with Responsibility for National Strategic Initiatives. In this capacity, his responsibility entails providing guidance and recommendations to the Prime Minister (and, when necessary, the Cabinet) regarding National Strategic Initiatives and Projects. Moreover, he will oversee the coordination of these initiatives and projects across various Ministries, Departments, and Government Agencies, ensuring their timely and efficient execution. This encompasses both ongoing and upcoming endeavors that are poised to foster a lasting and beneficial impact on the country's overall development.

== Education ==
He is a graduate of Wolmer's School, where he was a Deputy Head Boy and Warrant Officer Class 2 in the Jamaica Combined Cadet Force. Meade gained his Private Pilot Licence as a Cadet. He attended the Royal Military Academy, Sandhurst where he was adjudged the top International Student and awarded the Overseas Cane. Meade holds a Bachelor of Arts and a Master of Arts in Linguistics both from the University of the West Indies, a Master of Military Arts and Science from the US Army Command and General Staff College. He also holds a PhD in Linguistics from the University of Amsterdam and is an alumnus of the George C. Marshall European Center for Security Studies in Germany. In April 2019, Meade, alongside General Bari del Valle Sosa from Argentina and General Bipin Rawat from India, was inducted into the Command and General Staff College International Hall of Fame.

== Awards ==
He is a Commander of the Order of Distinction and the Justice of the Peace and a recipient of Queen Elizabeth II Diamond Jubilee Medal and the Medal of Honour for Meritorious Service.
