= Military ranks of Jamaica =

The Military ranks of Jamaica are the military insignia used by the Jamaica Defence Force. Jamaica shares a rank structure similar to that of the United Kingdom.

== Commissioned officer ranks ==
The rank insignia of commissioned officers.

| Rank group | General / flag officers | | | Senior officers | | | Junior officers |
|---|---|---|---|---|---|---|---|---|---|
| Jamaican Army |
| Jamaican Army | Lieutenant general | Major general | Brigadier | Colonel | Lieutenant colonel | Major | Captain | Lieutenant | Second lieutenant |
| Jamaican Coast Guard |
| Jamaican Coast Guard | Vice admiral | Rear admiral | Commodore | Captain | Commander | Lieutenant commander | Lieutenant | Lieutenant (junior grade) | Sub-lieutenant |
| Jamaican Air Wing |
| Jamaican Air Wing | | | | | Lieutenant colonel | Major | Captain | First lieutenant | Second lieutenant |
| Rank group | General / flag officers | | | Senior officers | | | Junior officers |

=== Student officer ranks ===
| Rank group | Student officer |
|---|---|
| Jamaican Army |
| Jamaican Army | Officer cadet |
| Jamaican Coast Guard |
| Jamaican Coast Guard | Midshipman |

== Other ranks ==
The rank insignia of non-commissioned officers and enlisted personnel.

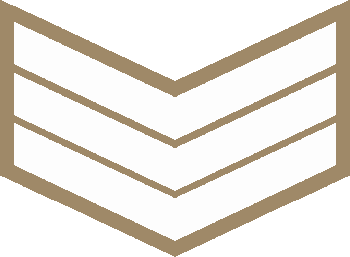
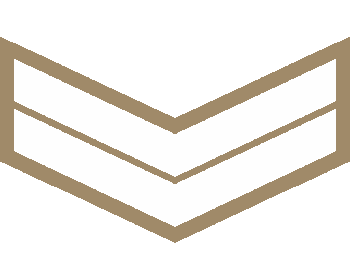
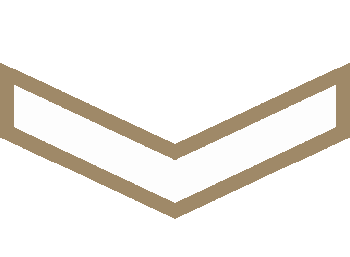
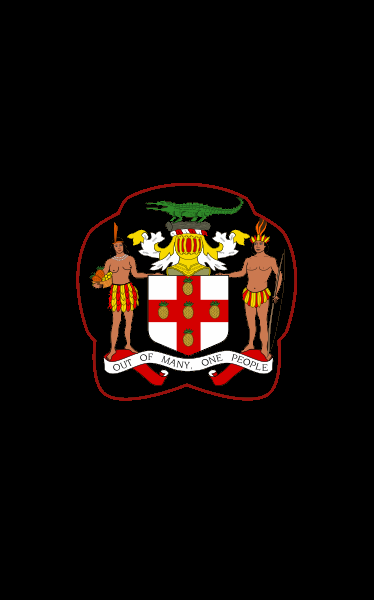
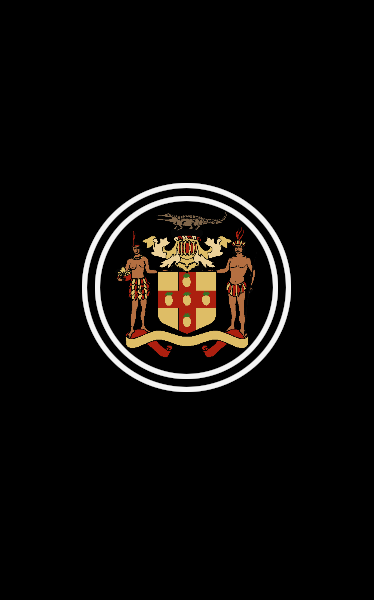
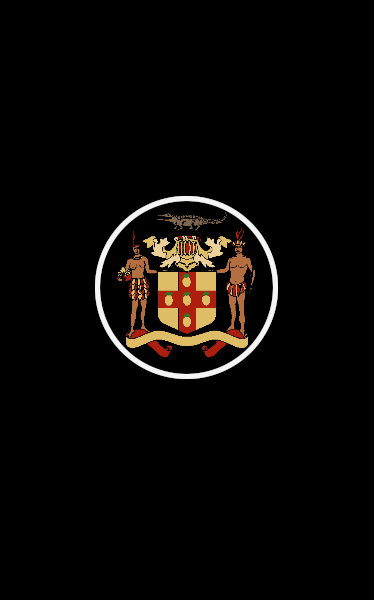
| Rank group | Senior NCOs | | | | Junior NCOs | | Enlisted |
|---|---|---|---|---|---|---|---|---|
| Jamaican Army | | | | | | | No insignia |
| Jamaican Army | Warrant officer class 1 | Warrant officer class 2 | Staff sergeant | Sergeant | Corporal | Lance corporal | Private (or equivalent) |
| Jamaican Coast Guard | | | | | | | | No insignia |
| Jamaican Coast Guard | Master chief petty officer 1 | Master chief petty officer | Chief petty officer | Petty officer | Leading seaman | | Able seaman | Ordinary seaman |
| Jamaican Air Wing | | | | | | | No insignia |
| Jamaican Air Wing | Warrant officer class 1 | Warrant officer class 2 | Staff sergeant | Sergeant | Corporal | Lance corporal | Private (or equivalent) |
| Rank group | Senior NCOs | | | | Junior NCOs | | Enlisted |

=== Appointments ===
The rank insignia for NCO appointments.

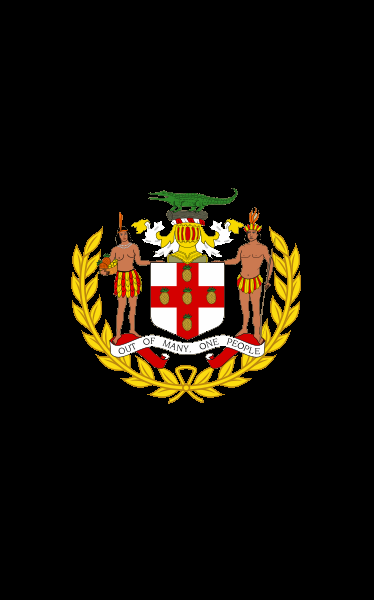
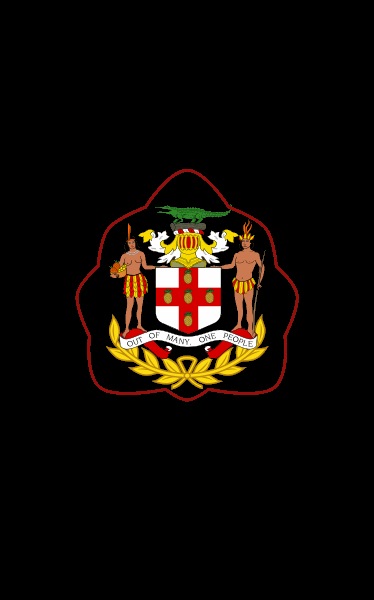
| Rank group | Warrant officer class 1 |
|---|---|---|---|
| Jamaican Army |
| Jamaican Army | Force sergeant major | Brigade sergeant major | Regimental sergeant major |
| Jamaican Coast Guard |
| Jamaican Coast Guard | Force sergeant major | Brigade sergeant major | Regulating sergeant major |

== Pre 2019 ranks ==
Commissioned officer ranks

The rank insignia of commissioned officers.

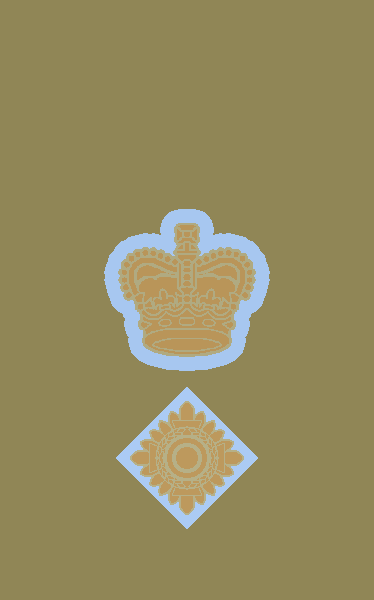
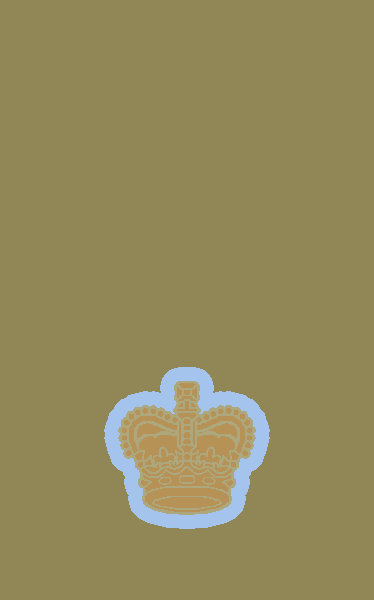
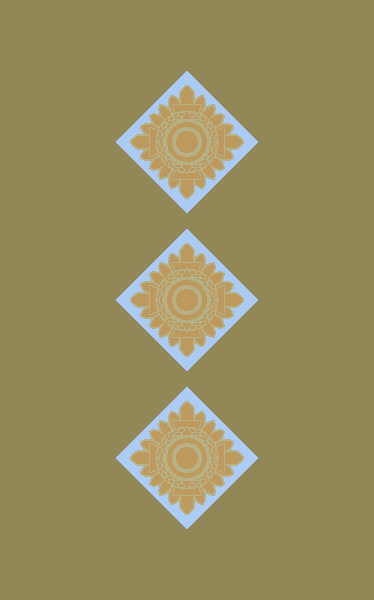
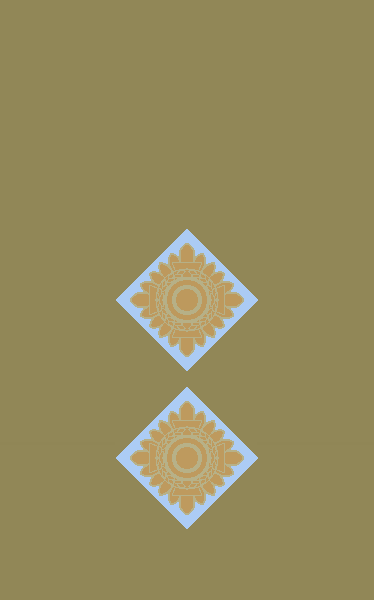
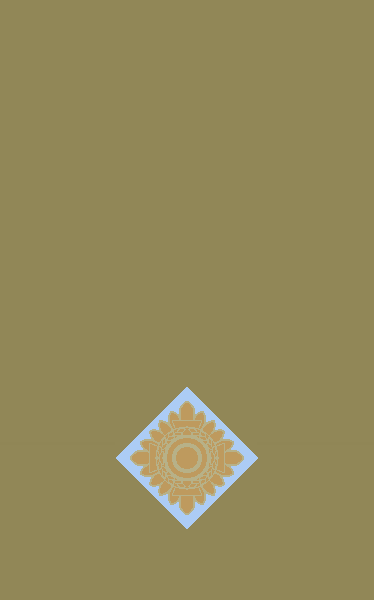
| Rank group | General / flag officers | | | Senior officers | | | Junior officers |
|---|---|---|---|---|---|---|---|---|---|
| Jamaica (–2019) |
| Jamaica (–2019) | Lieutenant general | Major general | Brigadier | Colonel | Lieutenant colonel | Major | Captain | First lieutenant | Second lieutenant |
| Jamaica (–2019) |
| Jamaica (–2019) | | | | | Lieutenant colonel | Major | Captain | First lieutenant | Second lieutenant |
| Rank group | General / flag officers | | | Senior officers | | | Junior officers |

Other ranks

The rank insignia of non-commissioned officers and enlisted personnel.

| Rank group | Senior NCOs | | | | Junior NCOs | | Enlisted |
|---|---|---|---|---|---|---|---|---|
| Jamaican Army (–2019) | | | | | | | No insignia |
| Jamaican Army (–2019) | Warrant officer class 1 | Warrant officer class 2 | Staff sergeant | Sergeant | Corporal | Lance corporal | Private (or equivalent) |
| Jamaican Coast Guard (–2019) | | | | | | | | No insignia |
| Jamaican Coast Guard (–2019) | Master chief petty officer I | Master chief petty officer II | Chief petty officer | Petty officer | Leading seaman | | Able seaman | Ordinary seaman |
| Jamaican Air Wing (–2019) | | | | | | | No insignia |
| Jamaican Air Wing (–2019) | Warrant officer class 1 | Warrant officer class 2 | Staff sergeant | Sergeant | Corporal | Lance corporal | Private (or equivalent) |
| Rank group | Senior NCOs | | | | Junior NCOs | | Enlisted |
