= The Jamaica Regiment =

- Cap Badge of the Jamaica Defence Force
- Active: 31 July 1962–Present
- Country: Jamaica
- Branch: Jamaica Defence Force
- Type: Line Infantry
- Role: Light infantry
- Size: Five battalions
- Part of: Jamaica Defence Force
- Garrison/HQ: RHQ - Moneague; 1st Battalion - Kingston; 2nd Battalion - Montego Bay; 3rd Battalion - Kingston; 4th Battalion - Central Region of Jamaica; Combat Support Battalion
- Mottos: First and Foremost (1st Battalion); Strive to achieve, never to yield (2nd Battalion); Always Ready (3rd Battalion)
- March: Quick - Jamaica Defence Force

Commanders
- Colonel in Chief: King Charles III

Insignia
- Cap band dicing

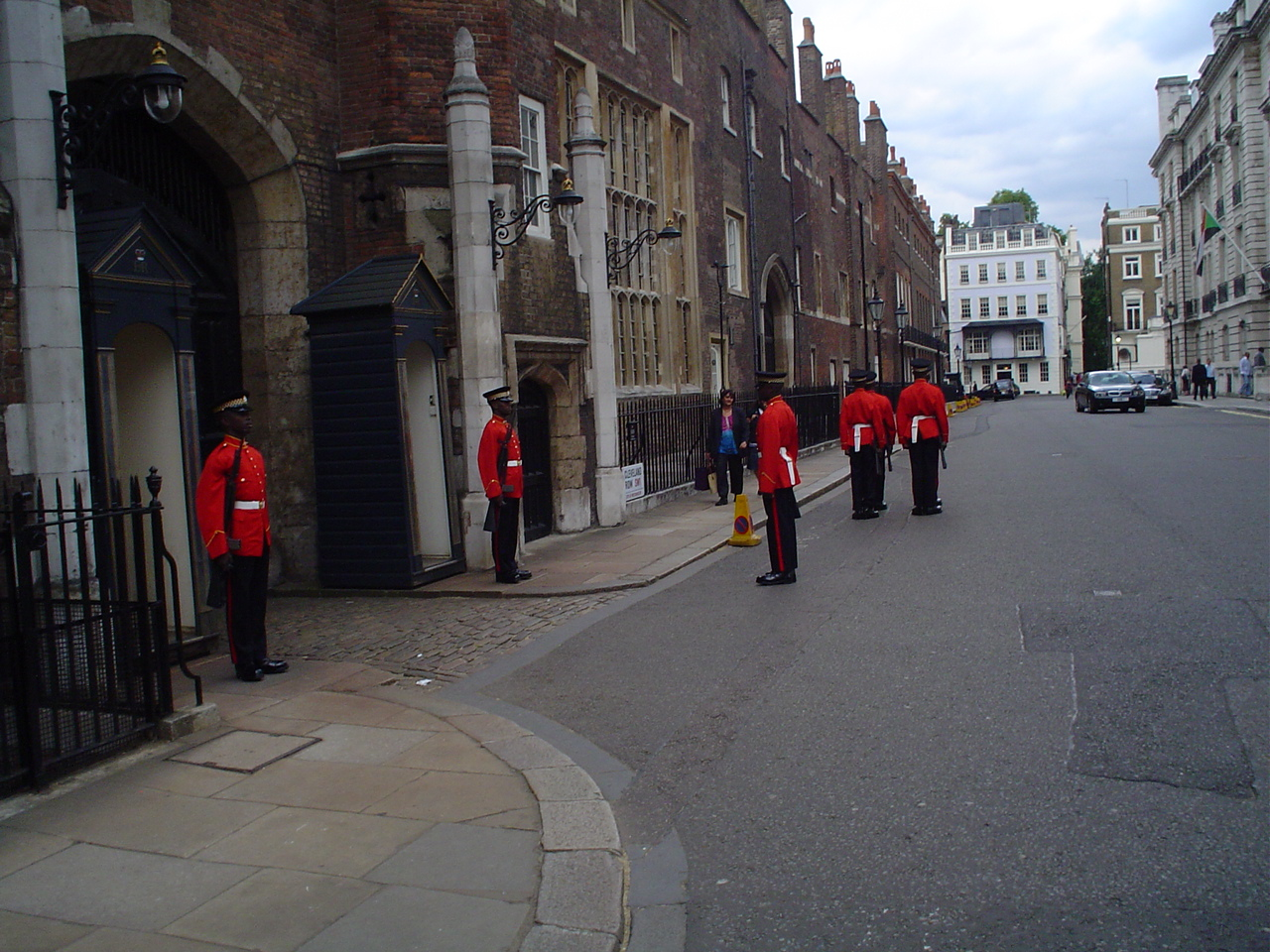
Sentries of the Jamaica Regiment outside St James's Palace in July 2007

The Jamaica Regiment is the main formation of land troops in the Jamaica Defence Force. It is a non-mechanised infantry regiment consisting of five battalions, three regular infantry battalions, one territorial infantry battalion, and a Combat Support Battalion. A fifth infantry battalion (5 JR) is starting to be formed. The regiment has two main operational missions:

- The territorial defence of Jamaica.
- Assisting the Jamaica Constabulary Force with local law enforcement.

It also has been known to provide public duties in for the government and the capital on behalf of the JDF.

The regiment has two main camps. Traditionally, the two regular battalions (1 JR and 2 JR) rotated annually between them. This approach is evolving towards a geographic deployment in three regions. The battalion at Up Park Camp in Kingston has a commitment to assisting the local police in maintaining law and order, while the battalion at Moneague Training Camp in Moneague, St Ann is mainly committed to anti-drug patrols.

In 2018 the Jamaican government decided to have an enhanced, regional structure for the Jamaica Regiment. Thus, it decided to add a third regular battalion (4 JR) to support the police in Jamaica's central region. In addition, the regiment is one of the main units that supplies United Nations peacekeeping troops for situations in the Caribbean region.

== History ==
The Jamaica Regiment was initially formed in 1954 as a unit on the British Army colonial list. In 1958, the Federation of the West Indies was founded, and the regiment passed from the control of the War Office to the new Federation government, where it, and the other infantry regiments of the various Caribbean islands, were disbanded and reorganised into the West India Regiment. This lasted only two years, before this was disbanded and each of the individual islands regained control over their own armies. Initially, the regiment consisted of the 1st Battalion and the 3rd Battalion (National Reserve); however, the increasing array of tasks that the regiment was called upon to perform led to it being stretched. So, in 1979, 3 companies and part of the HQ of the 1st Battalion were split and used to form the 2nd Battalion; this mirrored the form and functions of the 1st Battalion. In 1999, the 2nd Battalion had the honour of mounting the guard at Buckingham Palace. The 1st Battalion undertook this during a visit to the United Kingdom in July and August 2007.

In 1983, the regiment participated in the United States-led invasion of Grenada.

In 2019 the Jamaican government announced that the Jamaica Defence Force (JDF) would be expanded. As a result of this growth the Jamaica Regiment will fulfill two functions. Firstly, it will continue as a "British-style" infantry regiment that is the spiritual home and repository of customs and traditions for a number of battalions that do not necessarily serve together operationally. Secondly, it will act as a brigade-level formation for four infantry battalions of the regiment as well as a combat support battalion. At the end of the planned growth, the Jamaica Regiment will consist of four regular infantry battalions (1st, 2nd, 4th, and 5th), a Combat Support Battalion, and three reserve infantry battalions (3rd, 6th, and 9th).

== Organization ==
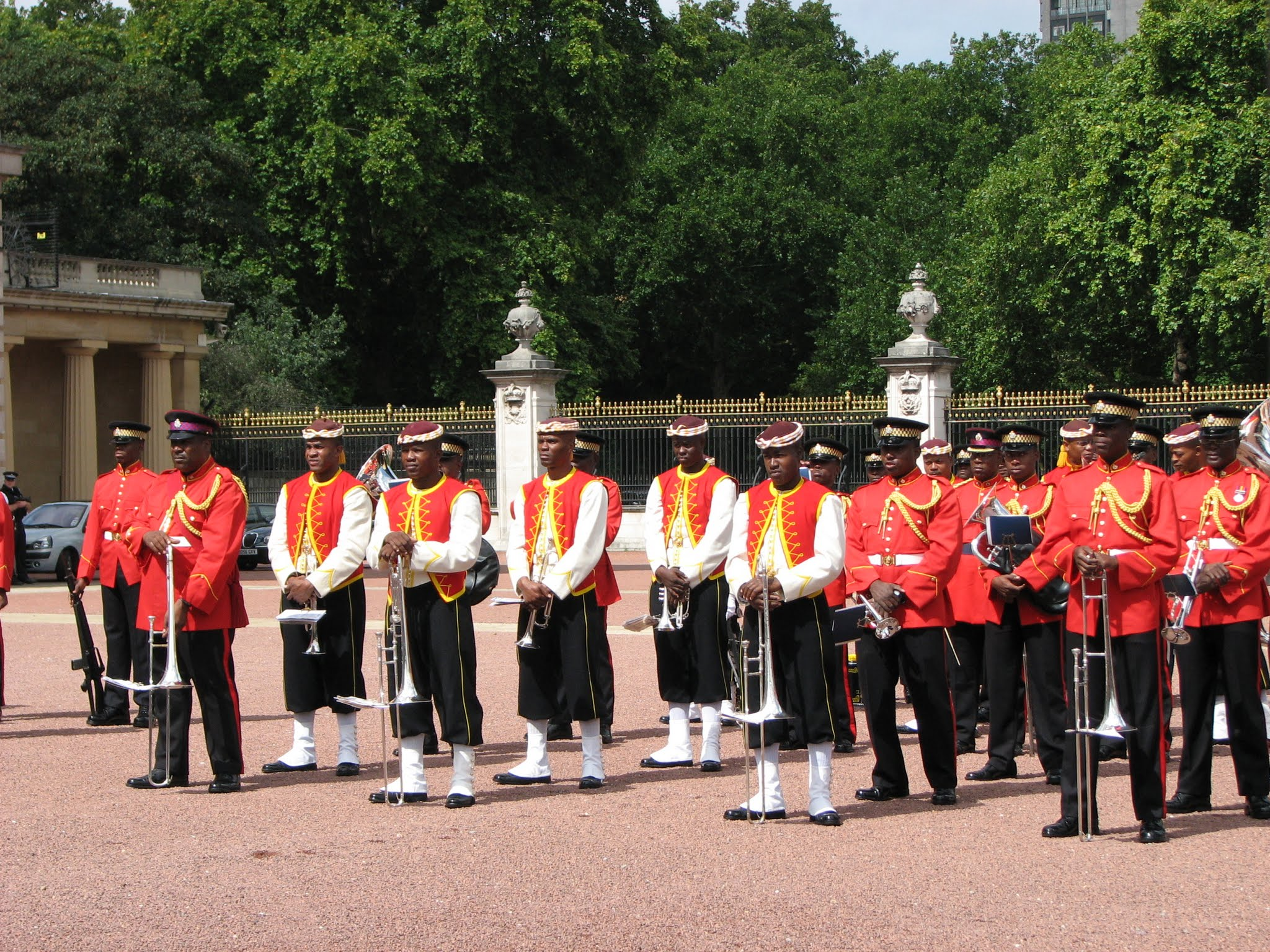
Members of the JRB at Buckingham Palace.

Currently, the regiment consists of the following regular/reserve units:

- 1st Battalion - Light Infantry
- 2nd Battalion - Light Infantry
- 3rd Battalion (reserve) - Light Infantry
- 4th Battalion - Light Infantry Formed in 2018 to provide a battalion in Jamaica's central region. It achieved operational capability on 1 June 2019, in part by taking over assets from the Combat Support Battalion)
- 5th Battalion (forming) - Light Infantry
- Combat Support Battalion
  - Which now includes The Jamaica Regiment Band (JRB) - Public duties
  - Corps of Drums (part of 1st and 3rd Battalions)

== Music ==
The regimental march of the Jamaica Regiment is the JDF March. However, each of the regiment's three battalions has its own march:

- 1st Battalion – So Early In The Morning
- 2nd Battalion – 2nd Battalion West India Regiment (Königgrätzer Marsch)

== Alliances ==
- United Kingdom — The Mercian Regiment
- Canada — The Royal Canadian Regiment

== Former members ==
- Darren Jordon - Former BBC newsreader
- Clive Hunt - Reggae record producer and former member of the regimental band

== See also ==
- The Barbados Regiment
- West India Regiment
