= Green Bay Massacre =

Jamaican massacre on 5 January 1978

- Part of the Jamaican political conflict
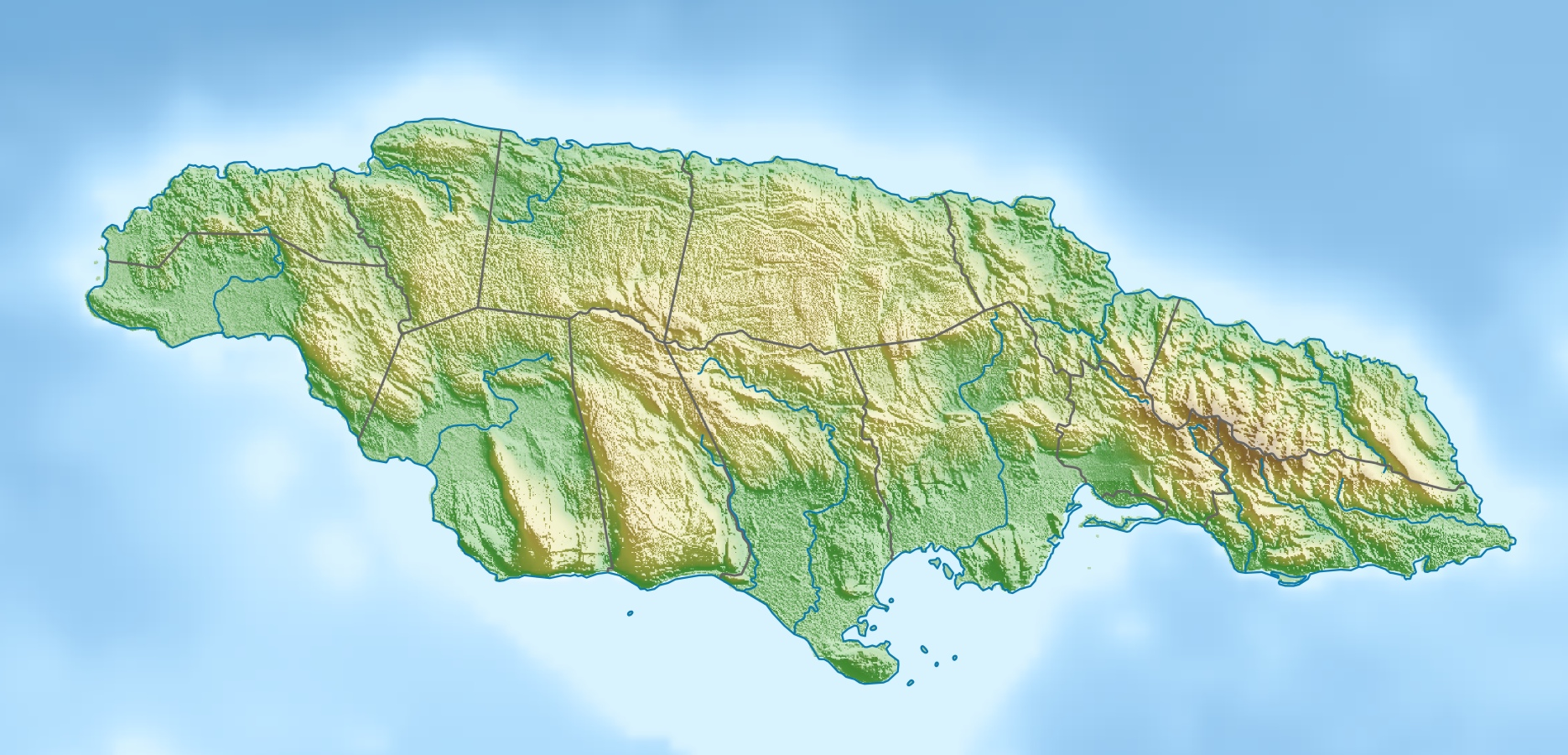
- Location: 17.9403°N 76.8780°W; Green Bay firing range, Port Henderson, Jamaica
- Date: 5 January 1978
- Attack type: Ambush
- Deaths: Five

The Green Bay Massacre was a covert operation on 5 January 1978, in which five Jamaica Labour Party supporters were shot dead after being lured into an ambush at the Green Bay Firing Range by members of the Jamaica Defence Force.

== Motivation ==
The victims all hailed from the Higholborn Street and Gold Street areas of the Jamaica Labour Party (JLP) stronghold of South Side community in downtown Kingston. They were identified as being too closely linked to the opposition JLP and were singled out as being prime targets for assassination by members of the leading People's National Party (then headed by the now deceased Michael Manley). The Military Intelligence Unit (M.I.U) was required by government members to take "all reasonable steps" to ensure removal either overtly or covertly of anyone who was deemed to be a threat to the island's security and to the smooth running of the PNP government.

== The massacre ==
The operation was executed by undercover agents of the Military Intelligence Unit going into the Southside Community and infiltrating the Southside's' "POW Posse" which was a local gang operating in the area led by the now assassinated Franklyn Allen aka "Chubby Dread". There were fourteen men in this gang who were originally targeted for assassination. The men were promised jobs as drivers and bodyguards.

The men, needing the arms and funding, agreed; and in the early hours of 5 January 1978, an army ambulance driven by an MIU operative, and a minivan picked them up at the intersection of Higholborn Street and Port Royal Street, then headed west towards Port Henderson, Saint Catherine where the Green Bay artillery range is located. On arrival at the Military Base, the men were led out to a section of the range where they were given strict instructions not to move as they would be picked up by other persons who would take care of their work requirements and supply them with arms to be transported into Kingston..

As soon as the MIU operatives drove off, a specially selected team of snipers from the JDF, led by Major Ian Robinson was lying in ambush in the nearby hills. The soldiers were armed with L8 General Purpose Machine Guns (GPMG), L2A2 Self Loading Rifles and Sterling Sub-Machine Guns with Browning 9mm pistols as sidearms. On the receipt of a pre-arranged signal from one of the MIU operatives which was the firing of a single shot from his Browning 9mm pistol into the upper torso of Winston Hamilton aka "Saddle Head", the sniper team opened fire on the group of men from their nest in the hills. Five men fell dead under the hail of gunfire that erupted and the remainder fled into nearby bushes. At least one member, (Delroy Griffiths) entered the bay and was rescued by a passing fishing boat.

Those killed were all Labourites from South Side:

- Norman Thompson aka "Gutto", age 27, a former national footballer for SANTOS football team
- Glenroy Richards, age 29, an aspiring reggae singer
- Trevor Clarke, age 26, a labourer.
- Winston Hamilton aka "Saddle Head", age 30, a contractor.
- Howard Martin, age 19, a labourer.

== Aftermath ==
The official report released by the Military was that the men were shot dead after they were surprised by a special Strike Force of soldiers doing target practice with guns smuggled into the country on the Jamaica Defence Force artillery firing range at Green Bay.

This report did not stick, as the people of South Side demonstrated to protest against the killings. An official inquiry and Coroners' Inquest was later held in the Spanish Town Coroner's Court where a jury found that persons had conspired to kill the men at Green Bay and that people in the JDF were criminally responsible for the massacre. The overwhelming evidence was that the men were lured to Green Bay and ambushed by soldiers led by Major Ian Robinson and Captain Karl Marsh.

In July 1978, warrants were issued by the Supreme Court for ten members of the JDF for First Degree Capital Murder and Conspiracy to Commit Murder. These included Major Ian Robinson, Captain Karl Marsh, Lieutenants Suzanne Haik, and Frederick Frazer, Sergeant LaFlamme Schooler, Privates Desmond Grant, Errol Grant, Everald King, Colin Reid and Joel Stainrod. Those charged for the conspiracy were all acquitted in June and July 1981 on no case submissions and those charged for the actual murders were acquitted on 8 February 1982 due to insufficient evidence.

The Jamaica Labour Party refused the verdict but could do nothing to bring the perpetrators to justice as they were already acquitted by the Courts. The Michael Manley led PNP has always disavowed knowledge of the covert action that took the lives of the men and said it was purely a military operation that was later justified. The incident is considered one of the worst acts of brutality in Jamaican history.
