= Port Authority of Jamaica =

- Abbreviation: PA
- Formation: 1972
- Type: Independent organisation
- Legal status: Statutory corporation
- Purpose: Regulation and development of Jamaica's ports and shipping industry
- Headquarters: 15-17 Duke Street, Kingston, Jamaica
- Region served: Jamaica
- Parent organization: Ministry of Transport and Mining
- Website: www.portjam.com

The Port Authority of Jamaica (PAJ) is an agency of the Ministry of Transport and Mining responsible for the:

- regulation and development of Jamaica's ports and shipping industry
- safety of all vessels navigating the ports of entry
- regulation of tariffs on goods passing through the public wharves.

== Ports controlled ==
The primary ports for which it is responsible include:

In Kingston

- Kingston Container Terminal
- North Terminal
- South Terminal (Gordon Cay)
- West Terminal
- Fifth Terminal

Elsewhere

- Lucea
- Montego Bay
- Ocho Rios
- Port Antonio
- Port Esquivel
- Port Kaiser
- Port Rhoades
- Rio Bueno
- Rocky Point
- Falmouth

== History ==
The Port Authority was established as a statutory corporation under the Port Authority Act, 1972. A Commercial Free Zone and Distribution Hub for the Americas is currently under development. Since 2008, the Port of Kingston has begun expansions to improve its facilities in response to the Panama Canal Expansion. Ultimately, Jamaica hopes to become the main transshipment hub in the Western Hemisphere and become a developed nation.

The Port Authority recently opened a new port for cruise ships in Falmouth, Trelawny. The new Falmouth, Jamaica Port of call is home to many merchants and cruise lines like Royal Caribbean allowing many tourists to enjoy the port and surrounding natural beauty of Jamaica. The Port Authority also invited Air Ambulance Jamaica to monitor and provide emergency services to any tourist or local with any medical condition.

== See also ==
- Kingston Harbour
