= Up-Park Camp =

Headquarters of the Jamaica Defence Force

Coordinates: 17°59′38″N 76°46′48″W

Location of Up-Park Camp in Jamaica

Up-Park Camp (often Up Park Camp) was the headquarters of the British Army in Jamaica from the late 18th century to independence in 1962. From that date, it has been the headquarters of the Jamaica Defence Force. It is located in the heart of Kingston. There is a heliport there which is used by the Jamaica Defence Force.

== British use ==
The mortality rate of British soldiers in Jamaica was very high, particular as a result of yellow fever. By the late 18th century some 5% of the garrison was dying each year and the House of Assembly resolved to construct more sanitary barracks. In 1784 a 156-acre (0.63 km^{2}) estate known as Up Park Pen was purchased by the War Department for £350. Within a few years the first barracks was destroyed by a hurricane and the 1801-1805 Governor of Jamaica George Nugent erected a replacement barracks suitable for 1,000 men and a hospital.

Land at Wolmer's Pen was acquired in 1820 which helped alleviate a water shortage at the camp. By 1830 additional water was supplied by pipes from the sugar plantations at Papine. In 1900 the camp was expanded with 257 acres (104 ha) of adjoining land (purchased for £3,789 19s 6d) for barracks, hospital and sports facilities and 85 acres (34 ha) of land (at a cost of £680) for a rifle range. Between 1919 and 1922 a further 112 acres (45 ha) of land were added to the camp at a cost of £1,190.

During the Second World War an increase in troop numbers led to the construction of the Harman Barracks on the site in 1943-44. A prisoner of war camp for Germans was also housed on the site, the prisoners constructed a new Up-Park Camp officers club. In the 1950s part of the camp was relinquished by the War Department for construction of Tom Redcam Avenue to relieve traffic congestion at Cross Roads. Additional land provided for construction of the Kingston and St. Andrew Parish Library and the Jamaica Library Service headquarters, opened in July 1958. Before 1962 the Jamaica Military Workshop relocated to the camp, freeing up its old site for use by the Jamaican police transport department. Around the same time 83 acres (34 ha) were sold to provide a site for the National Stadium.

The site contains a cemetery containing 174 Commonwealth casualties of the two world wars and memorials to a further 37 buried elsewhere on the island and on Grand Turk. The sites are maintained by the Jamaican 1 Engineer Regiment.

== Jamaican use ==
British forces withdrew from Jamaica on its independence in 1962. The Up-Park Camp hospital became a childrens hospital. The Curphey Barracks were constructed to house Jamaican reserve forces and an airstrip constructed on the former polo ground to house the new Jamaican Defence Forces air wing. In the 1960s part of the camp was sold, including a portion to the Jamaica Rifle Club who erected their headquarters and rifle range.

By the early 21st century Up-Park Camp consisted of 90 hectares (220 acres) of land, housing all units of the Jamaican Defence Force apart from the Coast Guard, one infantry battalion which is posted to Moneague Training Camp and three reserve infantry companies at Montego Bay, Mandeville and Port Maria.

In March 2026 prime minister Andrew Holness announced plans to establish a new $5 billion military base, Camp Wareika, in East Kingston. This would become the new main facility for the defence force but the military would still make some use of Up-Park Camp.
