= 1st Engineer Regiment (Jamaica) =

1 Engineer Regiment (JDF)
- Active: 1 April 1992–present
- Country: Jamaica
- Branch: Army
- Type: Engineers
- Role: Military engineering
- Size: One regiment
- Part of: Jamaica Defence Force
- Garrison/HQ: Kingston
- Motto(s): Ubique; Technical and Tactical
- March: Men of Steel

Insignia
- Cap band dicing

The 1 Engineer Regiment (JDF) is a unit of the Jamaica Defence Force primarily responsible for providing military and civil engineering. The regiment was formed in 1992 after a requirement was identified for increased military and civil engineering capability for the JDF than could be provided by the then existing structure. At the time, all JDF engineering capacity was provided by the Construction Squadron and the Engineering Unit of the Support and Services Battalion.

== Composition ==
The regiment today consists of a total of four distinct sub-units:

- 2 Field Squadron - this is the primary combat engineering unit, with responsibility for the use of explosives in both demolition and for training purposes.
- 3 Construction Squadron - this provides engineering for use in the construction of permanent structures for the military and for various agencies of government.
- 4 Support Squadron - this provides administrative and logistic support to the regiment.
- 5 Maintenance Squadron - this is the maintenance unit for all JDF properties.

== Directives ==
The regiment's primary purpose is to provide military engineering support to the JDF, and to assist as required agencies of the government when so directed by HQ JDF. As such, it has a number of specific priorities:

- Combat engineering support of all JDF units in military operations and training.
- Planning, construction and maintenance of all JDF installations.
- Assistance with the maintenance of technical essential services on a national basis, including the ongoing operation of the Jamaica Public Service Company Rockfort diesel station (power plant).
- Emergency engineering assistance for Disaster Relief and Recovery.
- Engineering assistance or advice to Government and civil agencies.
- Any other functions as directed by the Force Headquarters.
