= Ministry of Transport and Mining =

Government ministry of Jamaica

The Ministry of Transport and Mining is a cabinet position in Jamaica responsible for regulating and developing Jamaica's transport system. The Ministry is also responsible for regulating the mining industry in Jamaica. The current minister is Hon. Robert Montague.
