= Jamaica Defence Force =

Combined military forces of Jamaica

- Jamaica Defence Force badge
- Founded: 31 July 1962; 64 years ago
- Service branches: The Jamaica Regiment; Maritime, Air and Cyber Command; Support Brigade; Caribbean Military Academy; Jamaica National Reserve
- Headquarters: Up Park Camp, Kingston, Jamaica
- Website: jdfweb.com

Leadership
- Commander-in-chief: King Charles III
- Prime Minister: Andrew Holness
- Chief of Defence Staff: Vice Admiral Antonette Wemyss Gorman

Personnel
- Military age: 16 years of age for selection process, 17 years of age is actual serving age (as of 2007)
- Active personnel: 5,950
- Reserve personnel: 2,580

Expenditure
- Budget: $238 million

Related articles
- History: Haitian conflict
- Ranks: Military ranks of Jamaica

The Jamaica Defence Force (JDF) is the combined military of Jamaica, consisting of an infantry Regiment and Reserve Corps, an Air Wing, a Coast Guard fleet and a supporting Engineering Unit. The JDF is based upon the British military model, with similar organisation, training, weapons and traditions. Once chosen, officer candidates are sent to one of several British or Canadian basic officer courses depending upon the arm of service. Enlisted soldiers are given basic training at JDF Training Depot Newcastle. As in the British model, NCOs are given several levels of professional training as they rise up the ranks. Additional military schools are available for speciality training in Canada, the United Kingdom, and the United States.

== History ==
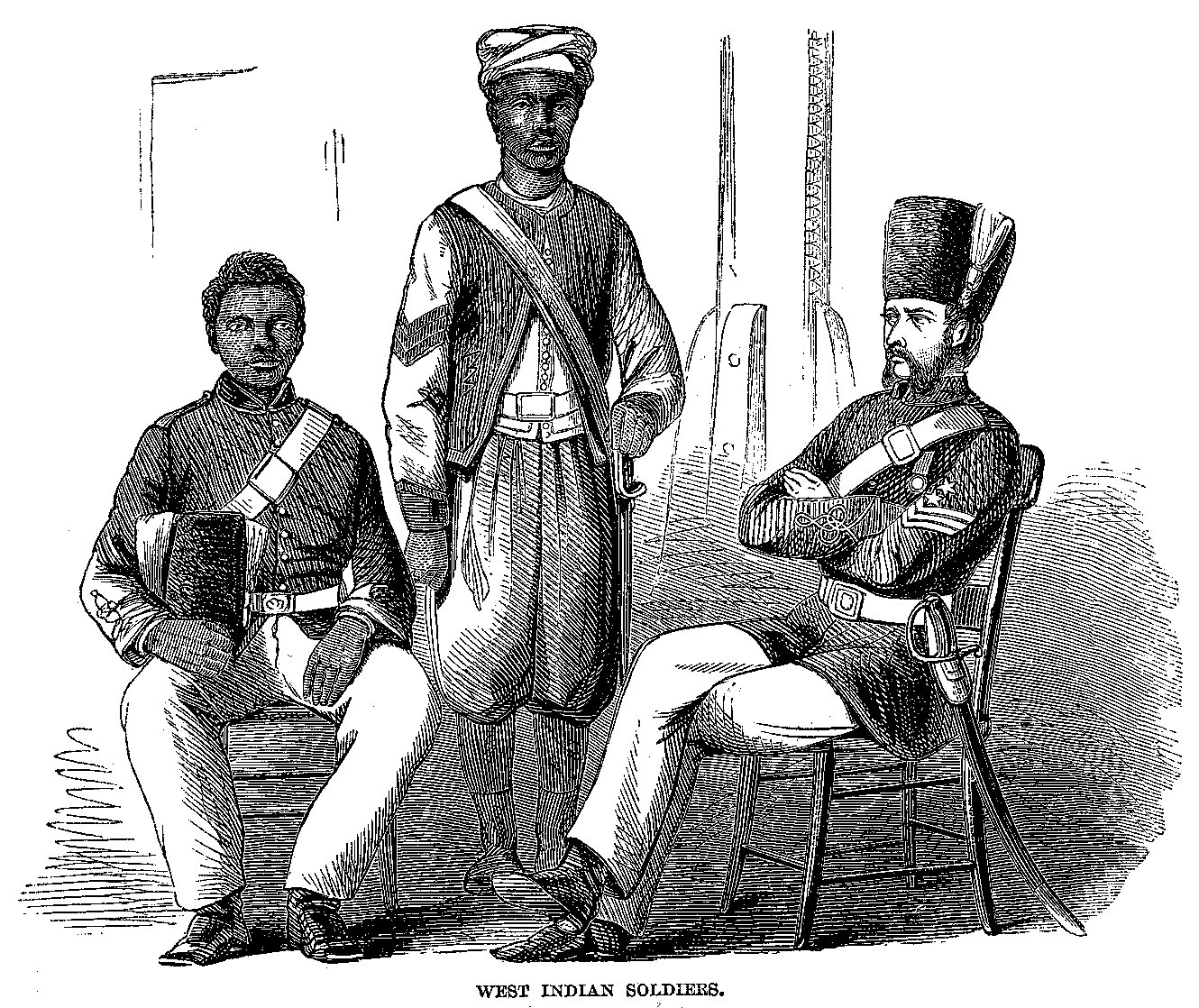
West Indian soldiers, c. 1861

The JDF is directly descended from the West India Regiments formed during the period of British rule. The regiments were used extensively by the British to garrison the Colony of Jamaica and possessions in the West Indies. Other units in the JDF heritage tree include the early colonial Jamaica Militia, the Kingston Infantry Volunteers of WWI and reorganised into the Jamaican Infantry Volunteers in WWII. The West India Regiments were reformed in 1958 as part of the West Indies Federation. The dissolution of the Federation resulted in the establishment of the JDF.

The Jamaica Defence Force (JDF) comprises an infantry Regiment and Reserve Corps, an Air Wing, a Coast Guard fleet and a supporting Engineering Unit. The infantry regiment contains the 1st, 2nd and 3rd (National Reserve) battalions. The JDF Air Wing is divided into three flight units, a training unit, a support unit and the JDF Air Wing (National Reserve). The Coast Guard element is divided between seagoing crews and support crews. It conducts maritime safety and maritime law enforcement as well as defence-related operations. The support battalion contains a Military Police platoon as well as vehicle, armourers and supply units. The 1st Engineer Regiment provides military engineering support to the JDF. The Headquarters JDF contains the JDF commander, command staff as well as intelligence, judge advocate office, administrative and procurement sections.

On 5 January 1978, the JDF carried out a covert operation that came to be known as the Green Bay Massacre, in which five Jamaica Labour Party (JLF) supporters were shot dead after being lured to a military shooting range. A specially selected team of snipers led by Major Ian Robinson laid an ambush outside the range while members of the JDF's Military Intelligence Unit (MIU) drove a group of JLF supporters towards them in an army ambulance. After the supporters exited the ambulance, an MIU soldier killed one member while the sniper team opened fire on the rest. Four supporters were killed and the remainder fled into nearby bushes.

In recent years the JDF has been called upon to assist the nation's police, the Jamaica Constabulary Force (JCF), in fighting drug smuggling and a rising crime rate which includes one of the highest murder rates in the world. JDF units actively conduct armed patrols with the JCF in high-crime areas and known gang neighbourhoods.

In 2024 the JDF, alongside the JCF deployed personnel as part of the Kenyan-led Multinational Security Support Mission in Haiti.

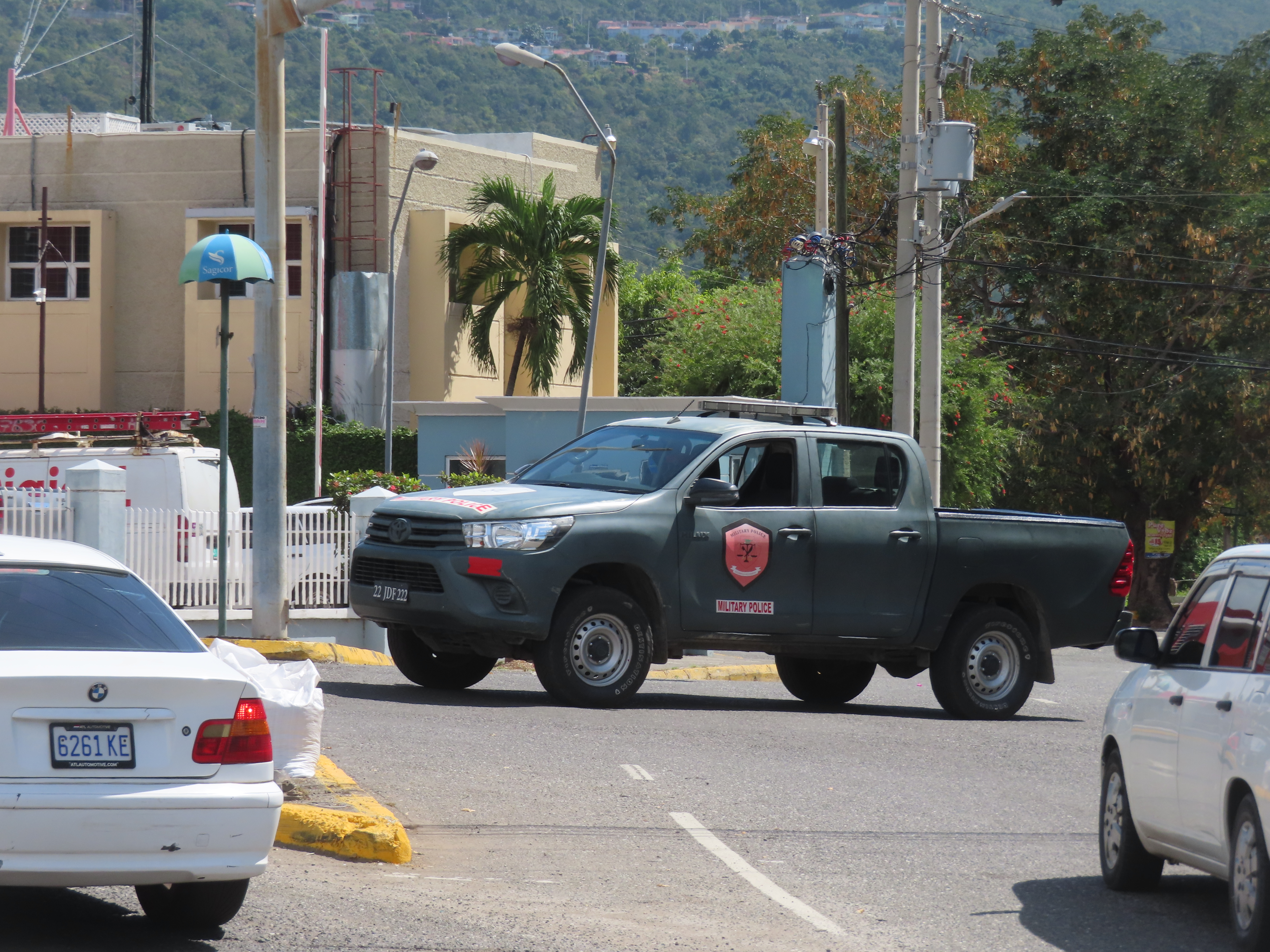
Jamaica Defense Force Military police corps Toyota Hilux

== Major units of the Jamaica Defence Force ==
- Headquarters, Jamaica Defence Force (HQ JDF) - divided into the Operations Branch and Adjutant Quartermaster's Branch, this is the main command of the entire JDF.
- The Jamaica Regiment - The Jamaica Regiment is the operationalization of a terrestrial and combat focused Regular Force formation with an overarching operational headquarters in command of five battalions; the First, Second, Fourth and Fifth Battalions the Jamaica Regiment (1, 2, 4, 5 JR) and the Combat Support Battalion (Cbt Sp Bn).
- The Support Brigade (Sp Bde) - Regular Force formation that provides both combat support and service support functions with an overarching operational headquarters for five units:
  A Jamaica Defence Force soldier (left) with a Sergeant of the Royal Bermuda Regiment in the Blue Mountains in 1996
  - Support and Services Battalion
  - 1 Engineer Regiment (JDF)
  - Health Services Corps
  - Corps of Military Police
- The Maritime, Air and Cyber Command (MACC) - The Maritime, Air and Cyber Command (MACC) is a multi-domain focused Regular Force formation with an operational headquarters in command of six units; the First and Second Districts Jamaica Defence Force Coast Guard (1st and 2nd Dist JDF CG), the Jamaica Defence Force Air Wing (JDF AW), the Military Intelligence Unit (MIU), the Special Activities Regiment (SPEAR), Counter Terrorism Operations Group (CTOG) and the Military Cyber Corps (MCC).
- Caribbean Military Academy (CMA) - The Caribbean Military Academy (CMA) was established on 1 May 2019 to function as a Military University, becoming the first of its kind in the Caribbean.
- The Jamaica National Reserve (JNR) - The Jamaica National Reserve (JNR) is a multi-domain focused Reserve Force formation that has been expanded to include a headquarters element in command of four units; the Third, Sixth and Ninth Battalions the Jamaica Regiment (3, 6 and 9 JR (NR)) in addition to the Support Battalion (National Reserve) (Sp Bn (NR).

=== Bands ===
The JDF also supports two military bands:

- Jamaica Military Band - this is the band that is descended from the band of the West India Regiment, and was formed in February 1927. It is one of only two units in the world (the other being the Band of the Barbados Regiment) that wears the uniform of the zouaves.
- Jamaica Regiment Band - this band was originally formed as the Band of the West India Regiment formed in 1959 as the military force of the West Indies Federation. With the Federation's break up and the independence of Jamaica, it became the Band of the 1st Battalion, Jamaica Regiment. It gained its current name with the formation of the 2nd Battalion in 1979.

== Army equipment ==
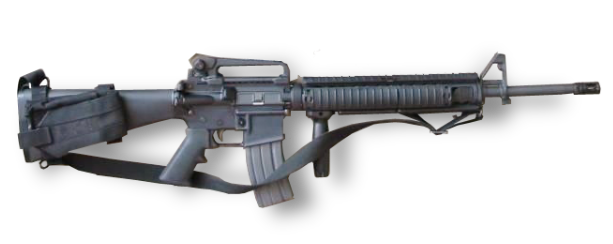
M16 rifle

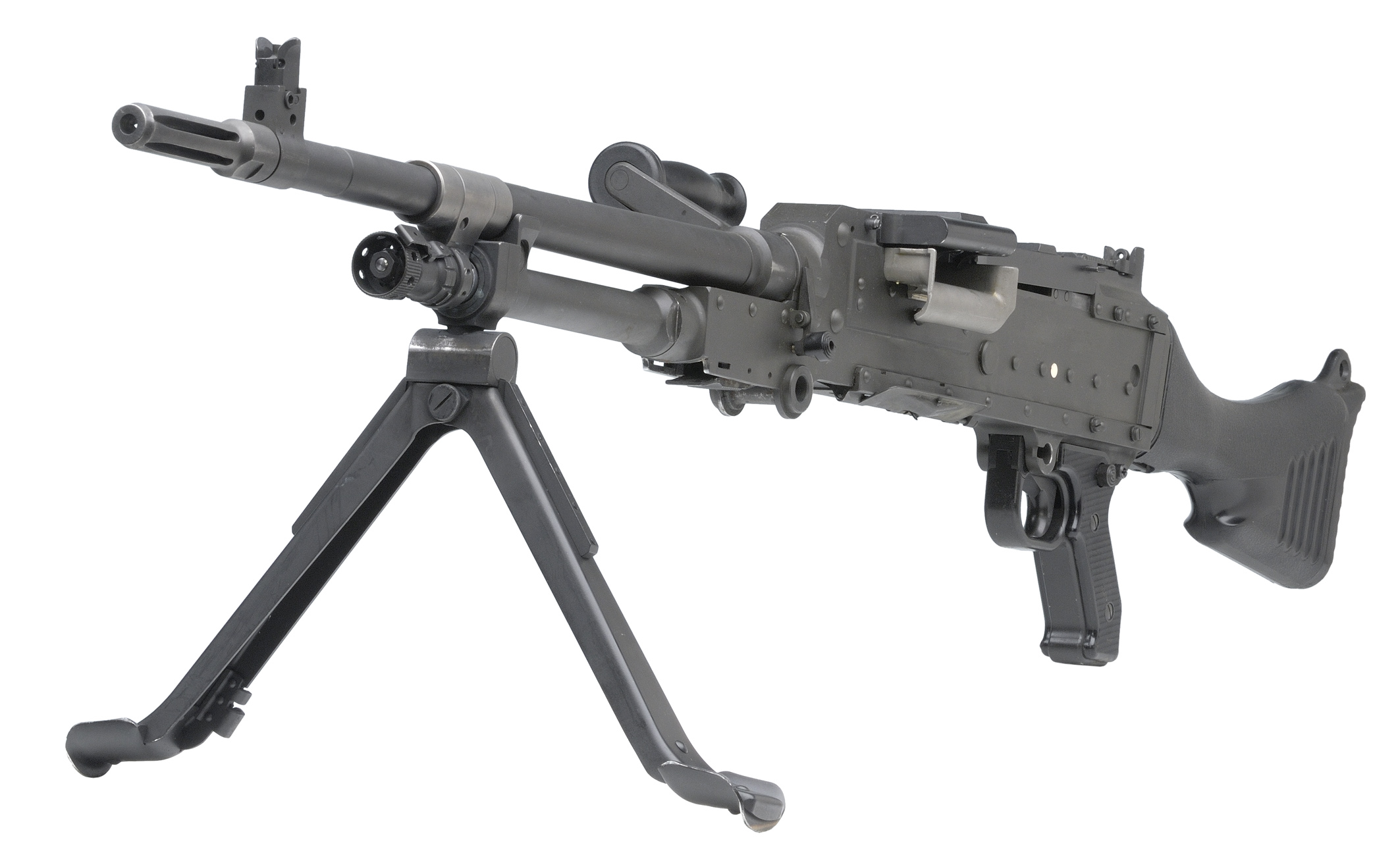
FN MAG machine gun

Name	Origin	Type	Variant	Notes
Small arms
GP35	United States	Pistol		
Glock	Austria	Pistol	17	
M16 rifle	United States	Assault rifle	M4	
SA80	United Kingdom	Assault rifle		
FN MAG	Belgium	Machine gun	L7A1	
M2 machine gun	United States	Heavy machine gun		
Springfield M79	United States	Grenade launcher		
Artillery
L16 81mm Mortar	United Kingdom	Mortar		
2-inch mortar	United Kingdom	Mortar		
Transport
Land Rover	United Kingdom	Patrol vehicle		
Toyota Land Cruiser	Japan	Utility vehicle		
Toyota Hiace	Japan	Minibus		
Toyota Coaster	Japan	Minibus		
Ford L Truck	United States	Heavy-duty truck	LN7000/8000	
Toyota Dyna	Japan	Van		
Armoured vehicles
Bushmaster Protected Mobility Vehicle	Australia	Infantry mobility vehicle		18
Cadillac Gage Commando	United States	Armoured personnel carrier		Retired
Staff cars
Volvo S90	Sweden	Executive car		1 for use by the Chief of Staff
Toyota Crown	Japan	Executive car		Used by senior staff and commanding officers
Toyota Corona	Japan	Executive car		Used by senior officers
Toyota Hilux	Japan	Pickup truck		Used for administrative purposes
Toyota Camry	Japan	Executive car		Used for senior officers
Toyota Land Cruiser Prado	Japan	Utility vehicle		For administrative purposes

== JDF Air Wing ==
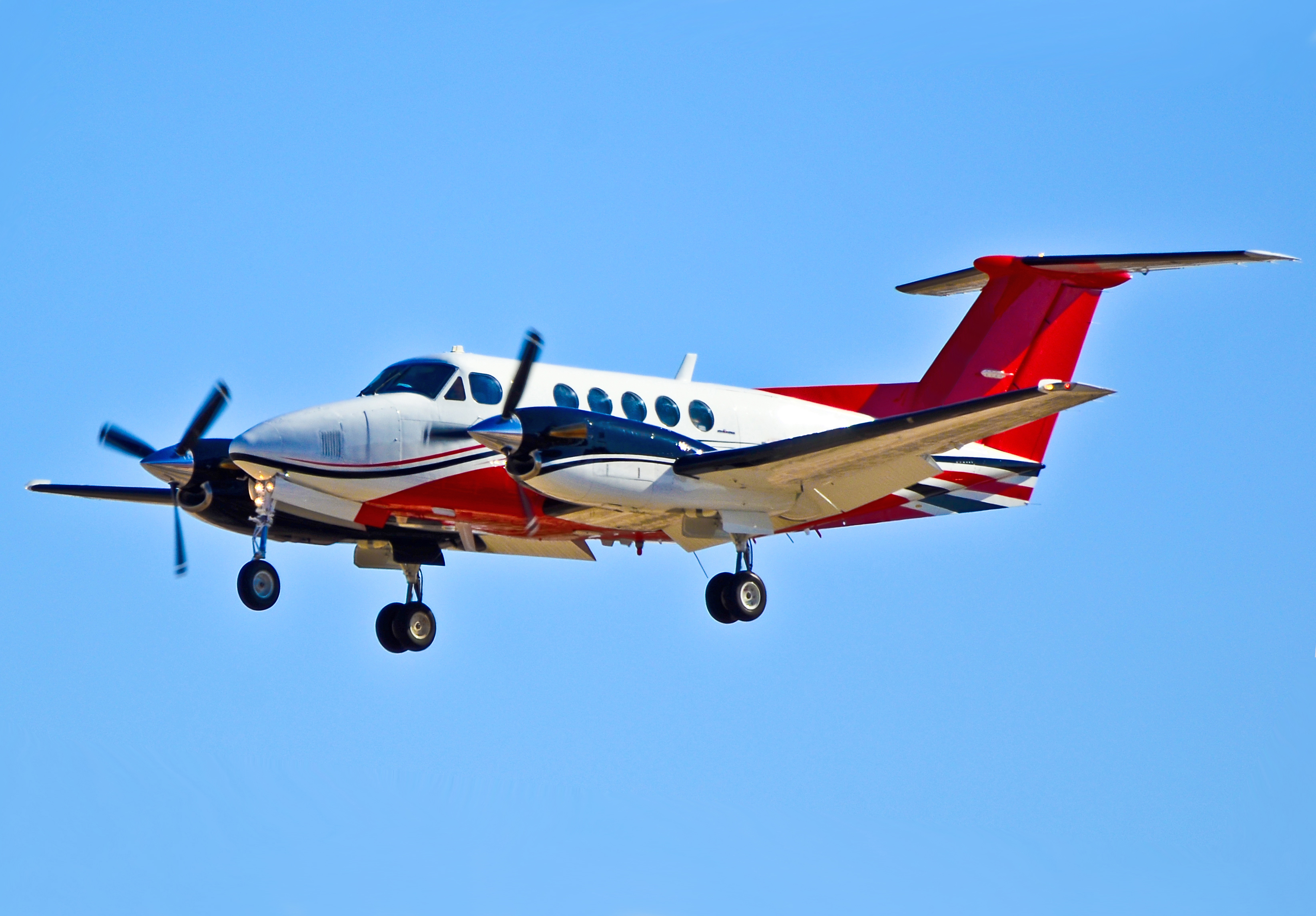
A Super King Air similar to this one is used by the JDF

Roundel of Jamaica Defence Force Air Wing

=== Current inventory ===
Aircraft	Origin	Type	Variant	In service
Maritime Patrol
Super King Air	United States	maritime patrol	350	1
Diamond DA62	Austria	maritime patrol	DA62 MPP	1
Helicopter
Bell 429	United States	utility / SAR		8
Trainer Aircraft
Bell 505	United States	trainer / utitity		6
Diamond DA40	Canada	trainer	DA40 CS	4
Diamond DA42	Canada	multi-engine trainer	DA42 NG	2

=== Retired ===
Previous aircraft operated by the JDF Air Wing consisted of the Aero Commander 500 family, BN-2 Islander, Beechcraft Duke, Beechcraft King Air, Cessna Skymaster, Cessna 185 Skywagon, Cessna 210, DHC-6 Twin Otter, Eurocopter AS355 Écureuil 2, Bell UH-1 Iroquois, Bell 47G, Bell 212, Bell 204/205, and the Bell 222UT helicopter.

=== Incidents ===
On July 1, 2009, a Jamaica Defence Force Air Wing Bell 412EP helicopter was on its way back to Up Park Camp from a training mission when it began experiencing mechanical issues. The helicopter crashed into the ground at Up Park Camp, injuring the captain, his co-pilot and a crew member.

== JDF Coast Guard ==
Jamaican naval ensign

A year after the JDF was formed in 1962, a naval arm, the Jamaica Sea Squadron was added. The squadron's initial vessels were three 63 ft wooden World War II torpedo recovery boats provided by the United States. They were commissioned "Her Majesty's Jamaican Ship" HMJS Yoruba (P1), HMJS Coromante (P2) and HMJS Mandingo (P3). A training team from the Royal Navy assisted with the unit's early development. In 1966 they changed names from the Jamaica Sea Squadron to the Jamaica Defence Force Coast Guard. JDF Coast Guard Headquarters "HMJS Cagway" located at Port Royal, Kingston. The Coast Guard had 4 additional stations: Discovery Bay, Black River, Pedro Cays, and Port Antonio.

As of 2016, the Jamaica Defence Force Coast Guard was staffed by 241 individuals.

=== Equipment ===
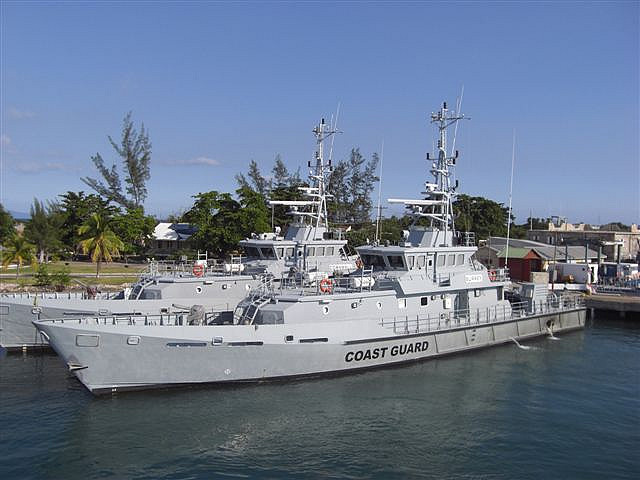
Jamaican Coast Guard patrol vessels

Vessel	Origin	Type	In service	Notes
HMJS Marcus Garvey	Netherlands	Patrol Vessel	1	Honour-class
HMJS Norman Manley	Netherlands	Patrol Vessel	1	Honour-class
HMJS Nanny of the Maroons	Netherlands	Fast Crew Supplier	1	Honour-class
HMJS Cornwall	Netherlands	Patrol Vessel	1	Honour-class
HMJS Middlesex	Netherlands	Patrol Vessel	1	Honour-class
HMJS Fort Charles	United States	Patrol Boat	1	Fort-class
HMJS Paul Bogle	United States	Patrol Boat	1	Hero-class
Boston Whaler	United States	Interceptor	2	37 foot Justice model

== Ranks of the JDF ==
=== Commissioned officers ===
The rank insignia for commissioned officers for the army and Coast Guard respectively.

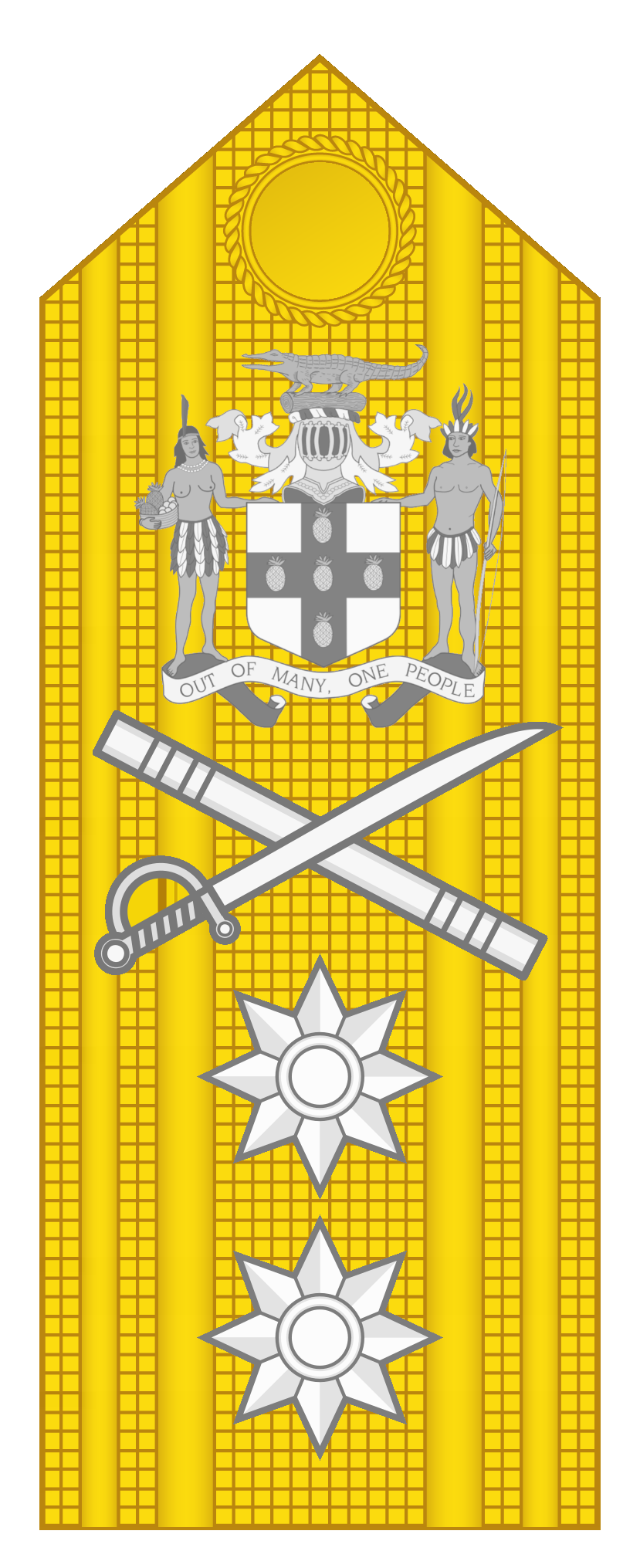
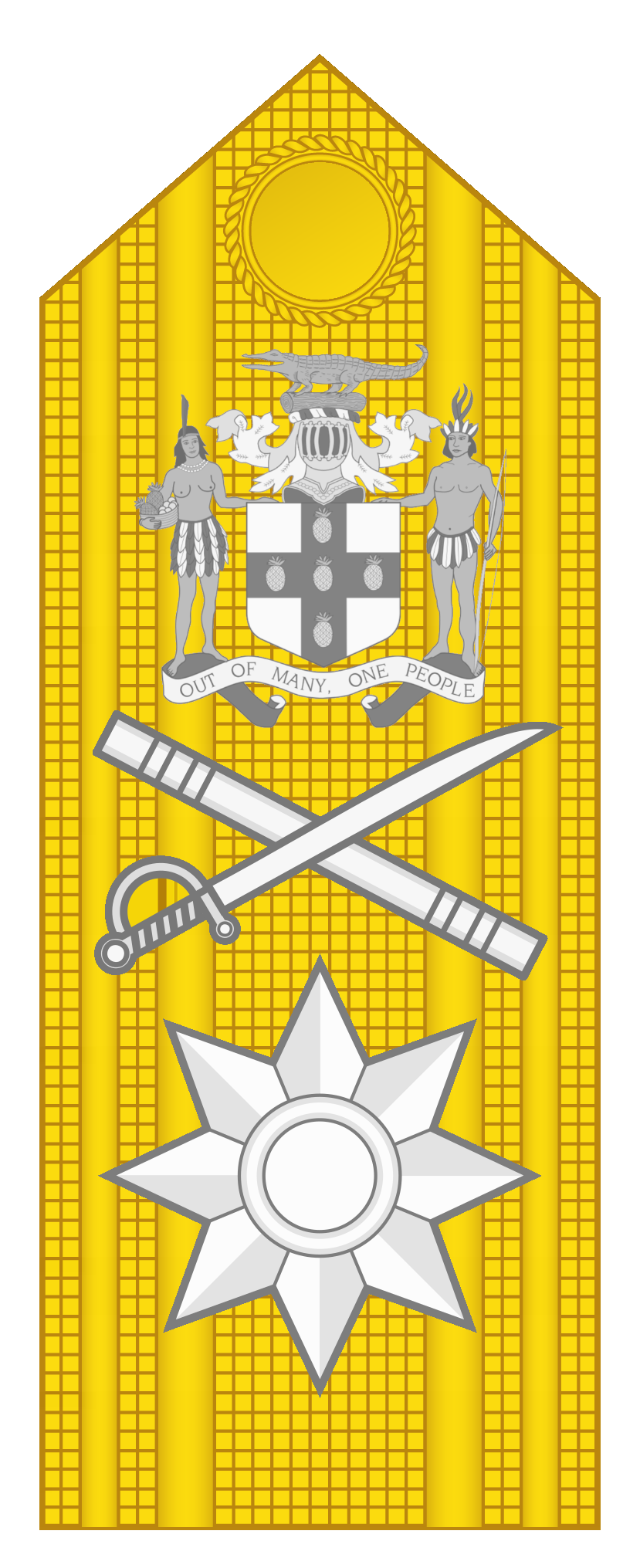
Rank group	General / flag officers			Senior officers			Junior officers
Jamaican Army
Jamaican Army	Lieutenant general	Major general	Brigadier	Colonel	Lieutenant colonel	Major	Captain	Lieutenant	Second lieutenant
Jamaican Coast Guard
Jamaican Coast Guard	Vice admiral	Rear admiral	Commodore	Captain	Commander	Lieutenant commander	Lieutenant	Lieutenant (junior grade)	Sub-lieutenant
Jamaican Air Wing
Jamaican Air Wing					Lieutenant colonel	Major	Captain	First lieutenant	Second lieutenant
Rank group	General / flag officers			Senior officers			Junior officers

=== Enlisted ===
The rank insignia for enlisted personnel for the army and Coast Guard respectively.

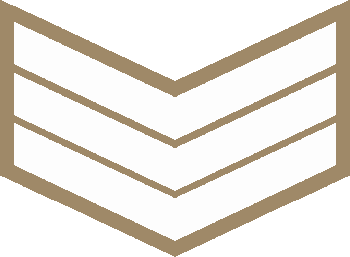
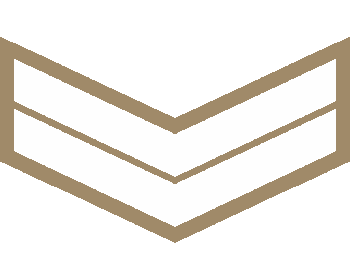
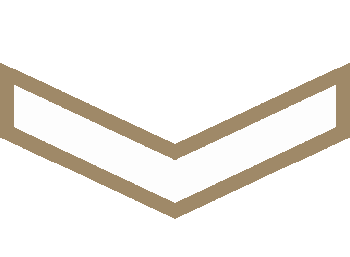
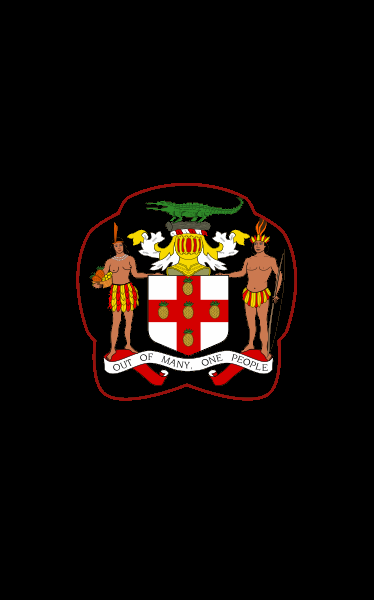
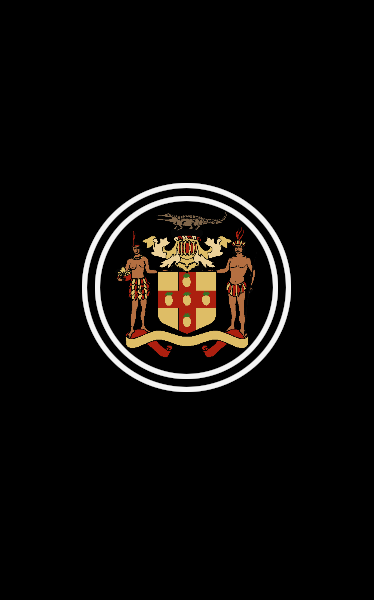
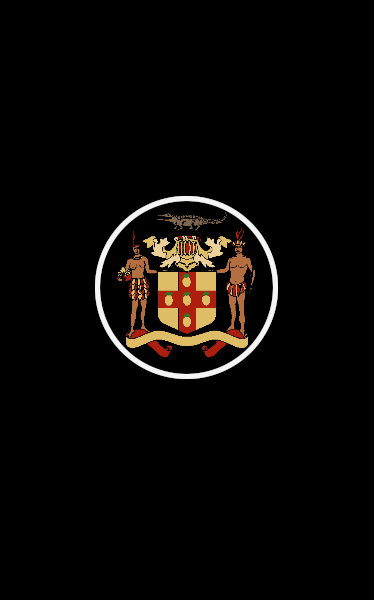
Rank group	Senior NCOs				Junior NCOs		Enlisted
Jamaican Army							No insignia
Jamaican Army	Warrant officer class 1	Warrant officer class 2	Staff sergeant	Sergeant	Corporal	Lance corporal	Private (or equivalent)
Jamaican Coast Guard								No insignia
Jamaican Coast Guard	Master chief petty officer 1	Master chief petty officer	Chief petty officer	Petty officer	Leading seaman		Able seaman	Ordinary seaman
Jamaican Air Wing							No insignia
Jamaican Air Wing	Warrant officer class 1	Warrant officer class 2	Staff sergeant	Sergeant	Corporal	Lance corporal	Private (or equivalent)
Rank group	Senior NCOs				Junior NCOs		Enlisted

== See also ==
- Green Bay Massacre
