= United States Central Command =

Unified combatant command of the U.S. Armed Forces responsible for the Middle East

United States Central Command (CENTCOM)
- Emblem of the United States Central Command
- Founded: 1 January 1983 (43 years, 10 months ago)
- Country: United States
- Type: Unified combatant command
- Role: Geographic combatant command
- Part of: United States Department of Defense
- Headquarters: MacDill Air Force Base; Florida, U.S.
- Motto: Persistent Excellence
- Engagements: Gulf War; Iraq War (2003–2011); War in Afghanistan (2001–2021); Operation Inherent Resolve; 2026 Iran war
- Website: www.centcom.mil

Commanders
- Commander: Admiral Brad Cooper, USN
- Deputy Commander: Lieutenant General Patrick Frank, USA
- Senior Enlisted Leader: Fleet Master Chief Lateef Compton, USN

Insignia
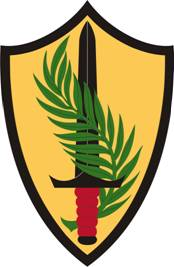
- Shoulder Sleeve Insignia

- NATO Map Symbol

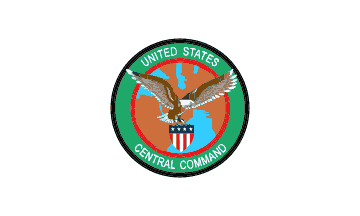
- Unit Flag

- US Central Command Flag

The United States Central Command (USCENTCOM or CENTCOM) is one of the eleven unified combatant commands of the United States Department of Defense. It was established in 1983, taking over the previous responsibilities of the Rapid Deployment Joint Task Force (RDJTF).

Its area of responsibility (AOR) includes the Middle East (including Egypt in Africa), Central Asia and parts of South Asia. The command has been the main American presence in many military operations, including the Persian Gulf War's Operation Desert Storm in 1991, the war in Afghanistan, as well as the Iraq War from 2003 to 2011. As of 2015, CENTCOM forces were deployed primarily in Afghanistan under the auspices of Operation Freedom's Sentinel, which was itself part of NATO's Resolute Support Mission (from 2015 to 2021), and in Iraq and Syria as part of Operation Inherent Resolve since 2014 in supporting and advise-and-assist roles.

As of 8 August 2025, CENTCOM's commander is Admiral Brad Cooper, U.S. Navy. Two of the last three United States secretaries of defense—Lloyd Austin and James Mattis, both of whom required congressional waivers to be confirmed—were recent CENTCOM commanders.

Of all seven American regional unified combatant commands, CENTCOM is among four that are headquartered outside their area of operations (the other three being USAFRICOM, USSOUTHCOM, and USSPACECOM). CENTCOM's main headquarters is located at MacDill Air Force Base, in Tampa, Florida. A forward headquarters was established in 2002 at Camp As Sayliyah in Doha, Qatar, which in 2009 transitioned to a forward headquarters at Al Udeid Air Base in Qatar.

In January 2021, Israel became the 21st country of the CENTCOM AOR, added to another 20 nations including Afghanistan, Bahrain, Egypt, Iran, Iraq, Jordan, Kazakhstan, Kuwait, Kyrgyzstan, Lebanon, Oman, Pakistan, Qatar, Saudi Arabia, Syria, Tajikistan, Turkmenistan, the United Arab Emirates, Uzbekistan and Yemen.

== History ==
The command was established on 1 January 1983. As its name implies, CENTCOM covers the "central" area of the globe located between then European and Pacific Commands (PACOM). (Changes since 1983 have seen the creation of Africa Command and change of title for PACOM to Indo-Pacific Command.) When the hostage crisis in Iran and the Soviet invasion of Afghanistan underlined the need to strengthen the U.S. presence in the region, President Jimmy Carter established the Rapid Deployment Joint Task Force (RDJTF) in March 1980. Steps were taken to transform the RDJTF into a permanent unified command over a two-year period. The first step was to make the RDJTF independent of U.S. Readiness Command, followed by the activation of CENTCOM in January 1983.

The command was configured to fight both the Soviets if necessary, and assure other U.S. interests in the area. In 1980, Saddam Hussein of Iraq invaded Iran, beginning the Iran–Iraq War. The war risked interruptions to the oil supply route out of the Persian Gulf/Arabian Gulf through the Strait of Hormuz. Developments like Iranian mining operations in the Gulf led to CENTCOM's first combat operations. On 17 May 1987, USS Stark, conducting operations in the Persian Gulf, was struck by Exocet missiles fired by an Iraqi aircraft, resulting in 37 casualties. Soon afterward, as part of what became known as the "Tanker War", the Federal government of the United States reflagged and renamed 11 Kuwaiti oil tankers. In Operation Earnest Will, these tankers were escorted by USCENTCOM's Middle East Force through the Persian Gulf to Kuwait and back through the Strait of Hormuz.

By late 1988, the regional strategy still largely focused on the potential threat of a massive Soviet invasion of Iran. Exercise Internal Look has been one of CENTCOM's primary planning events. It had frequently been used to train CENTCOM to be ready to defend the Zagros Mountains from a Soviet attack and was held annually.

In autumn 1989, the main CENTCOM contingency plan, OPLAN 1002-88, assumed a Soviet attack through Iran to the Persian Gulf. The plan called for five-and-two-thirds US divisions to deploy, mostly light and heavy forces at something less than full strength (apportioned to it by the Joint Strategic Capability Plan [JSCAP]). The original plan called for these five-and-two-thirds divisions to march from the Persian Gulf to the Zagros Mountains and prevent the Soviet Ground Forces (army) from seizing the Iranian oil fields.

After 1990, General Norman Schwarzkopf reoriented CENTCOM's planning to fend off a threat from Iraq, and Internal Look moved to a biennial schedule. There was a notable similarity between the 1990 Internal Look exercise scripts and the real-world movement of Iraqi forces which culminated in Iraq's invasion of Kuwait during the final days of the exercise. U.S. President George Bush responded quickly. A timely deployment of forces and the formation of a coalition deterred Iraq from invading Saudi Arabia, and the command began to focus on the liberation of Kuwait. The buildup of forces continued, reinforced by United Nations Security Council Resolution 678, which called for Iraqi forces to leave Kuwait. On 17 January 1991, U.S. and coalition forces launched Operation Desert Storm with a massive air interdiction campaign, which prepared the theater for a coalition ground assault. The primary coalition objective, the liberation of Kuwait, was achieved on 27 February, and the next morning a ceasefire was declared, just one hundred hours after the commencement of the ground campaign.

The end of formal hostilities did not bring the end of difficulties with Iraq. Operation Provide Comfort, implemented to provide humanitarian assistance to the Kurds and enforce a "no-fly" zone in Iraq, north of the 36th parallel, began in April 1991. In August 1992, Operation Southern Watch began in response to Saddam's noncompliance with United Nations Security Council Resolution 688 condemning his brutal repression of Iraqi civilians in southeastern Iraq. Under the command and control of Joint Task Force Southwest Asia, coalition forces in this operation enforced a no-fly zone south of the 32nd parallel. In January 1997, Operation Northern Watch replaced Provide Comfort, with a focus on enforcing the northern no-fly zone. Throughout the decade, CENTCOM carried out a string of operations – Vigilant Warrior, Vigilant Sentinel, Desert Strike, Desert Thunder (I and II), and Desert Fox – to try to coerce Saddam into greater compliance with U.S. wishes.

The 1990s also brought significant challenges in Somalia as well as from the growing threat of regional terrorism. To prevent widespread starvation as the Somali Civil War continued, CENTCOM began Operation Provide Relief in 1992 to supply humanitarian assistance to Somalia and northeastern Kenya. CENTCOM's Operation Restore Hope supported United Nations Security Council Resolution 794 and a multinational Unified Task Force, which provided security until the U.N. created UNOSOM II in May 1993. In spite of some UNOSOM II success in the countryside, the situation in Mogadishu worsened, and the significant casualties of the Battle of Mogadishu ultimately led President Bill Clinton to order the withdrawal of all U.S. troops from Somalia.

Throughout the 1990s, following the Gulf War, terrorist attacks had a major impact on CENTCOM forces. Faced with attacks such as the 1996 bombing of the Khobar Towers, which killed 19 American airmen, the command launched Operation Desert Focus, designed to relocate U.S. installations to more defensible locations (such as Prince Sultan Air Base), reduce the U.S. forward "footprint" by eliminating nonessential billets, and return dependents to the United States. In 1998 terrorists attacked the U.S. embassies in Kenya and Tanzania, killing 250 persons, including 12 Americans. The October 2000 attack on the USS Cole, resulting in the deaths of 17 U.S. sailors, was linked to Osama bin Laden's Al Qaida organization.

From April to July 1999, CENTCOM conducted Exercise Desert Crossing 1999, centered on the scenario of Saddam Hussein being ousted as Iraq's dictator. It was held in the offices of Booz Allen Hamilton in McLean, Virginia. The exercise concluded that unless measures were taken, "fragmentation and chaos" would ensue after Saddam Hussein's overthrow.

The September 11 terrorist attacks on New York and Washington DC led President George W. Bush to declare a war against international terrorism. CENTCOM soon launched Operation Enduring Freedom to expel the Taliban government in Afghanistan, which was harboring Al Qaida terrorists and hosting terrorist training camps.

Exercise Internal Look has been employed for explicit war planning on at least two occasions: Internal Look '90, which dealt with a threat from Iraq, and Internal Look '03, which was used to plan what became Operation Iraqi Freedom – the 2003 United States invasion of Iraq, which began on 19 March 2003. In the process, the existing operations plan, OPLAN 1003–98, aka 1003V, which had called for 500,000 troops for the invasion and control of Iraq, was radically slimmed down.

Following the defeat of both the Taliban regime in Afghanistan (9 November 2001) and Saddam Hussein's government in Iraq (8 April 2003), CENTCOM remained controlling the U.S. forces deployed there. U.S. forces were withdrawn from Iraq in 2010 (but returned years later); and were withdrawn from Afghanistan in 2021.

Beginning in October 2002, CENTCOM conducted operations in the Horn of Africa. Combined Joint Task Force – Horn of Africa was established to carry these activities out. These operations involved a series of Special Operations Forces raids, humanitarian assistance, consequence management, and a variety of civic action programs.

The command has also remained poised to provide disaster relief throughout the region; its most recent significant relief operations have been a response to the October 2005 earthquake in Pakistan, and the large-scale evacuation of American citizens from Lebanon in 2006.

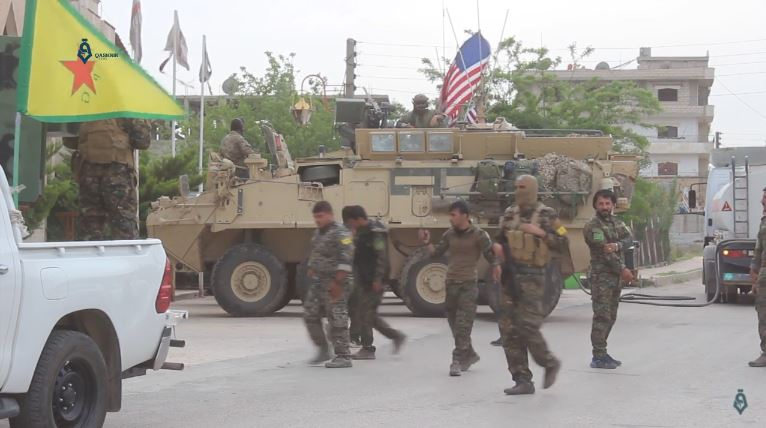
U.S. armored vehicle in Al-Hasakah, Syria, May 2017

On 1 October 2008, the Department of War transferred responsibility for Sudan, Eritrea, Ethiopia, Djibouti, Kenya, and Somalia to the newly established Africa Command. Egypt, home to Exercise Bright Star, the Department of War's largest reoccurring military exercise, remained in the CENTCOM Area of Responsibility. On 15 January 2021, responsibility for Israel was transferred from Europe Command to CENTCOM.

In January 2015, CENTCOM's Twitter feed was reported to have been hacked on 11 January by ISIS sympathizers. This situation lasted for less than one hour; no classified information was posted and "none of the information posted came from CENTCOM's server or social media sites"; however, some of the slides came from the federally funded Lincoln Laboratory at the Massachusetts Institute of Technology. In August 2015, intelligence analysts working for CENTCOM complained to the media, alleging that CENTCOM's senior leadership was altering or distorting intelligence reports on the Islamic State of Iraq and the Levant. In February 2017, the Inspector General of the United States Department of War completed its investigation and cleared the senior leadership of CENTCOM, concluding that "allegations of intelligence being intentionally altered, delayed or suppressed by top CENTCOM officials from mid-2014 to mid-2015 were largely unsubstantiated."

In January 2018, Turkey urged the United States to remove its troops from Syrian city of Manbij, saying that otherwise they might come under attack from Turkish troops; however, former CENTCOM commander Joseph Votel confirmed an American commitment to keeping troops in Manbij. In 2019, the Iranian government designated Central Command a terrorist organization after the Trump administration branded Iran's Islamic Revolutionary Guard Corps with the same label.

On 28 February 2026, CENTCOM led Operation Epic Fury, a large-scale joint US-Israeli military operation against Iran. In a statement, CENTCOM said that US and Israeli forces had begun striking military infrastructure including IRGC command-and-control facilities, air defense capabilities, missile and drone launch sites, and military airfields. The command stated the operation involved "the largest regional concentration of American military firepower in a generation" and that it involved troops from all six branches of the US armed forces. CENTCOM commander Admiral Brad Cooper confirmed that US forces had "successfully defended against hundreds of Iranian missile and drone attacks" and that there were no US casualties. Initial operations included air, land and sea-launched precision munitions, along with the first employment of US-made one-way attack drones.

== Structure ==
CENTCOM's main headquarters is located at MacDill Air Force Base, in Tampa, Florida. CENTCOM headquarters staff directorates include personnel, intelligence, operations, logistics, plans & policy, information systems, training & exercises, and resources, and other functions. The intelligence section is known as Joint Intelligence Center, Central Command, or JICCENT, which serves as a Joint Intelligence Center for the co-ordination of intelligence. Under the intelligence directorate, there are several divisions including the Afghanistan-Pakistan Center of Excellence.

=== Component Commands ===
CENTCOM directs five "service component commands" and one subordinate unified command:

| Emblem | Command | Acronym | Commander | Established | Headquarters | Subordinate Commands |
|---|---|---|---|---|---|---|
| | United States Army Central; Joint Force Land Component Command | USARCENT | Lt General Kevin Leahy | 1918 (as Third United States Army) | Shaw Air Force Base, South Carolina | Task Force Spartan; Area Support Group – Jordan; Area Support Group – Kuwait; 4th Battlefield Coordination Detachment; 1st Theater Sustainment Command; 335th Signal Command |
| | United States Naval Forces Central Command / United States Fifth Fleet; Joint Force Maritime Component Command | NAVCENT / FIFTHFLT | Vice Admiral Curt Renshaw | 1983 | Naval Support Activity Bahrain, Bahrain | Task Force 50; Task Force 51; Task Force 52; Task Force 53; Task Force 54; Task Force 55; Task Force 56; Task Force 57; Task Force 59; Task Force Shore Battlespace; Combined Task Force 150; Combined Task Force 151; Combined Task Force 152; USCG Patrol Forces Southwest Asia*; *USCG Command that augments NAVCENT in the CENTCOM AOR |
| | Ninth Air Force / United States Air Forces Central; Joint Force Air Component Command | 9 AF / USAFCENT | Lt General Daniel Lasica | 21 August 1941 | Shaw Air Force Base, South Carolina | 609th Air Operations Center; 332nd Air Expeditionary Wing; 378th Air Expeditionary Wing; 379th Air Expeditionary Wing; 380th Air Expeditionary Wing; 386th Air Expeditionary Wing; 432nd Air Expeditionary Wing*; 1st Expeditionary Civil Engineer Group; USAFCENT Band; *Assigned to Air Combat Command as the 432nd Wing, but acts as 432nd Air Expeditionary Wing when operating in the CENTCOM AOR |
| | Marine Corps Forces Central Command | MARFORCENT | Lt General Joseph Clearfield | 2005 | Macdill Air Force Base, Florida | 5th Marine Expeditionary Brigade |
| | United States Space Forces Central; Joint Force Space Component Command | USSPACEFORCENT | Brig General Todd Benson | 2 December 2022 | Macdill Air Force Base, Florida | |

=== Subordinate unified commands ===
| Emblem | Command | Acronym | Commander | Established | Headquarters | Subordinate Commands |
|---|---|---|---|---|---|---|
| | Special Operations Command Central | SOCCENT | Major General Jasper Jeffers III, USA | | Macdill Air Force Base, Florida | |

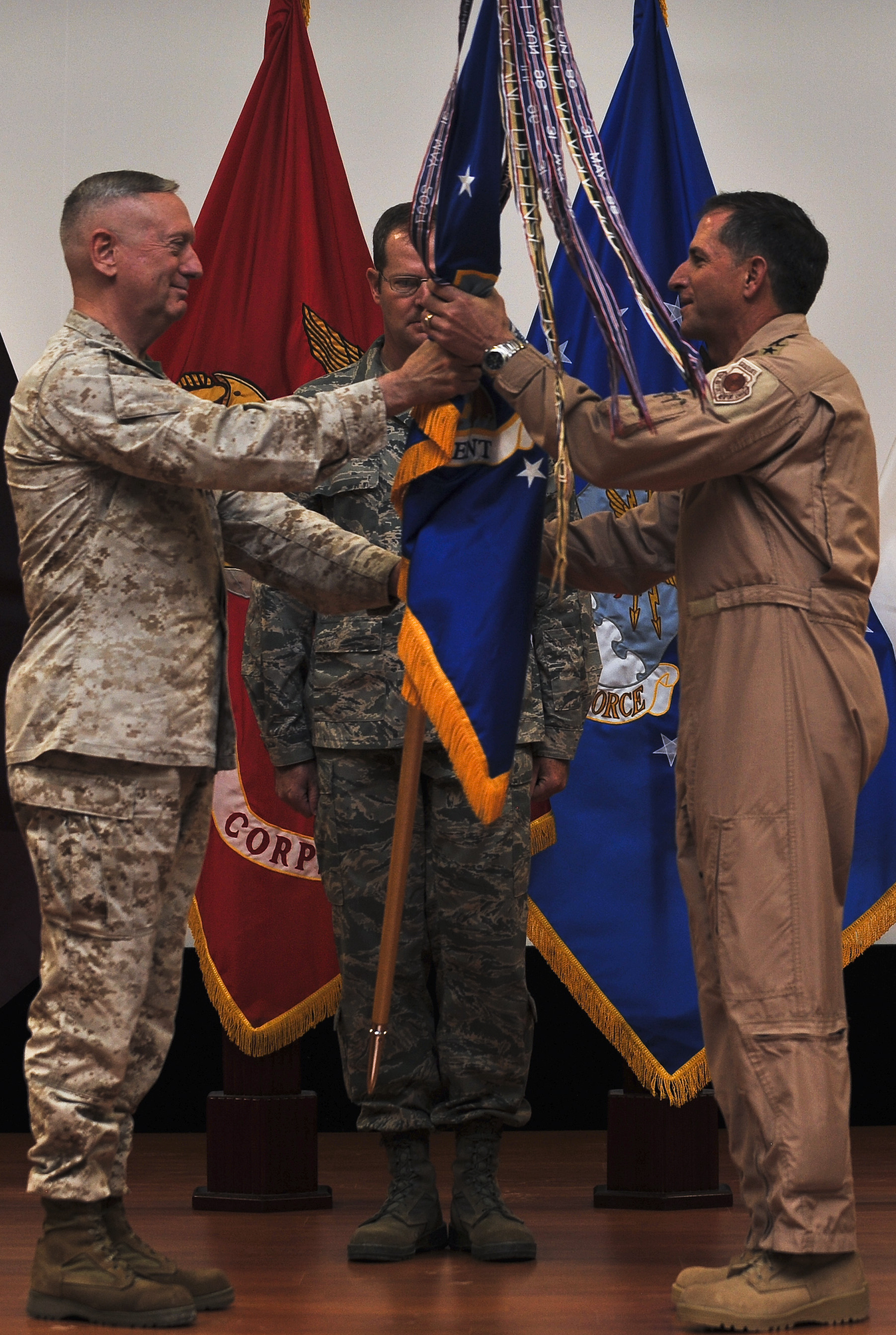
Commander of United States Central Command General James Mattis passes the United States Air Forces Central Command or Ninth Air Force guidon to then recently appointed Ninth Air Force Commander Lieutenant General David L. Goldfein at Shaw Air Force Base, South Carolina on 3 August 2011.

Two major subordinate multi-service commands reporting to Central Command were responsible for Afghanistan: Combined Joint Task Force 180 and Combined Forces Command Afghanistan (CFC-A). CFC-A was disestablished in February 2007. From that point onward, the International Security Assistance Force (ISAF) directed most U.S. forces in Afghanistan. A U.S. general (Dan K. McNeill) assumed command of ISAF that same month.

Temporary task forces include the Central Command Forward – Jordan (CF-J), which was announced in April 2013. CF-J's stated purpose was to work with the Jordanian armed forces to improve the latter's capabilities. There was speculation, however, that another reason for its establishment was to serve as a base from which raids into Syria could be launched to seize Syrian WMD if necessary, and as a launch pad for looming American military action in Syria.

On 1 October 2008 Combined Joint Task Force – Horn of Africa at Camp Lemonnier in Djibouti was transferred to United States Africa Command (USAFRICOM). The United States Forces – Iraq (USF-I) was a major subordinate multi-service command during the Iraq War order of battle until it was disestablished in 2011.

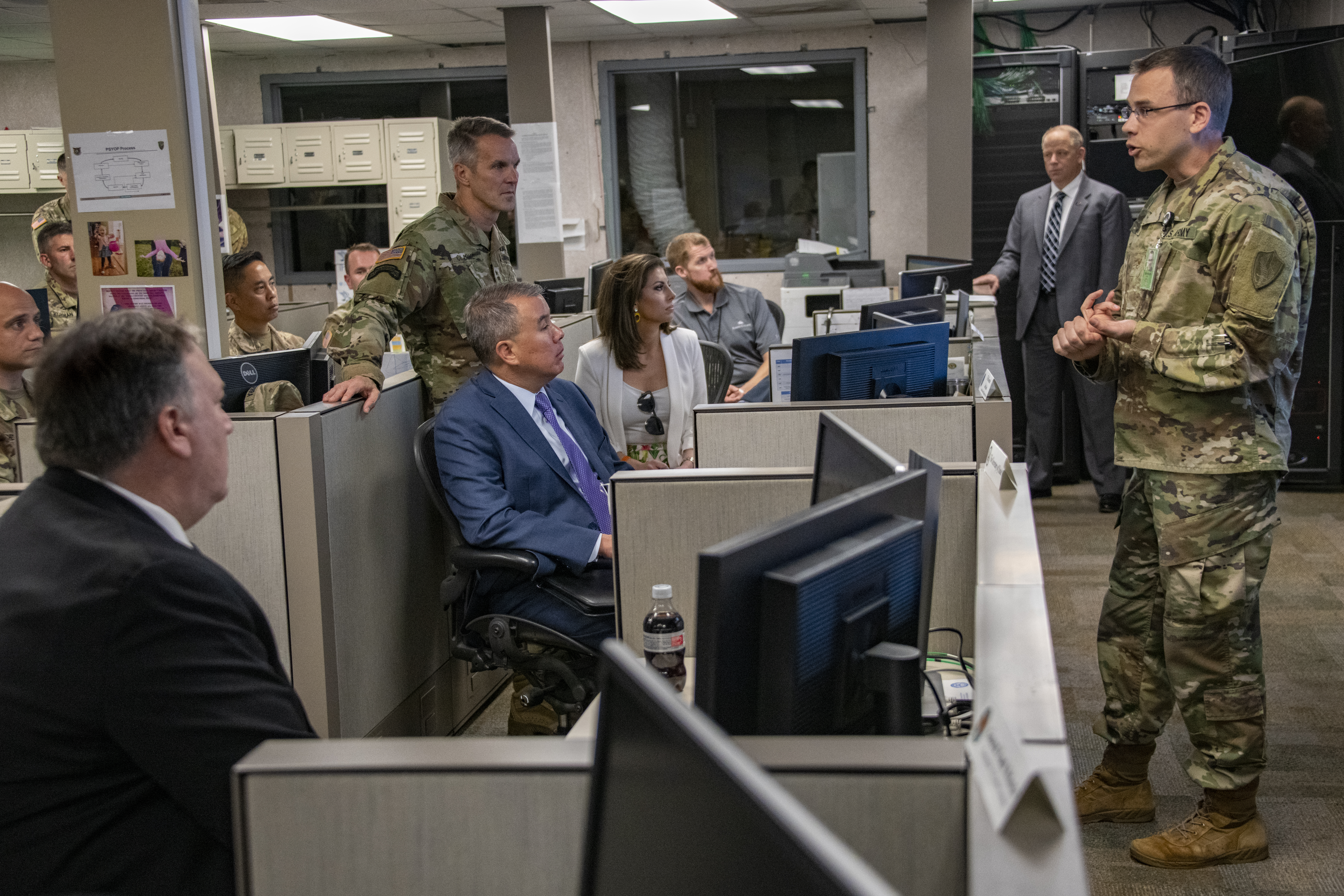
An Army officer briefs Secretary of State Mike Pompeo (left, foreground) on counter-ISIL social media activities at MacDill AFB, June 2018.

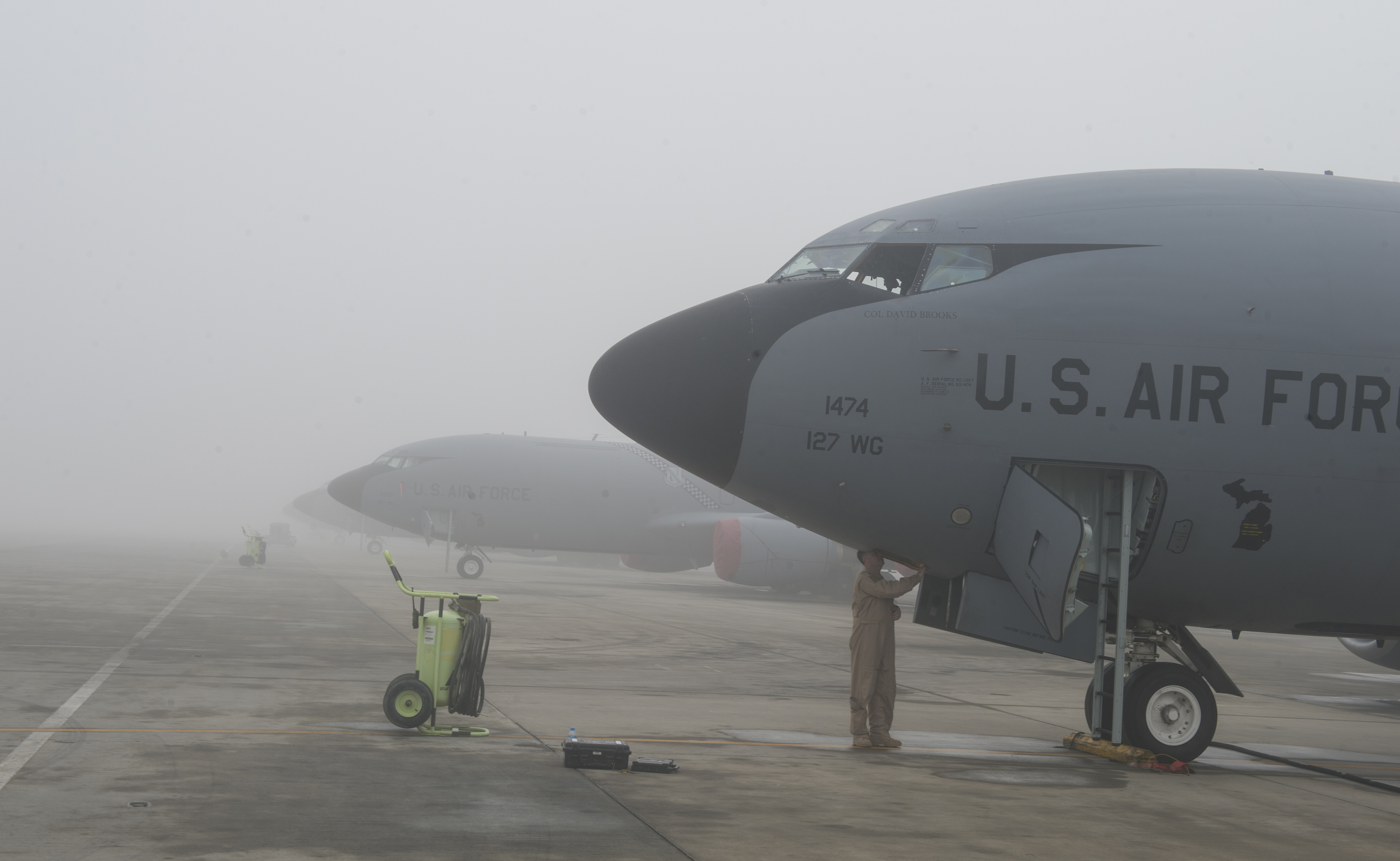
U.S. Air Force KC-135 Stratotankers at Al Udeid Air Base in Qatar

Elements of other Unified Combatant Commands, especially United States Special Operations Command (USSOCOM), operate in the CENTCOM area. It appears that SOCCENT does not direct the secretive Task Force 88, the ad-hoc grouping of Joint Special Operations Command 'black' units such as Delta Force and Army Rangers, which is tasked to pursue the most sensitive high-value targets such as Al Qaeda and the Taliban leadership since 11 September 2001. Rather, TF 77, which started out as Task Force 11 and has gone through a number of name/number changes, reports directly to Joint Special Operations Command, part of USSOCOM.

As of 2015, CENTCOM forces are deployed primarily in Iraq and Afghanistan in combat roles and have support roles at bases in Kuwait, Bahrain, Qatar, the United Arab Emirates, Oman, and central Asia. CENTCOM forces have also been deployed in Jordan and Saudi Arabia.

=== War planning ===
The following war plan numbers have been made public:

- OPLAN 1002-88, addressing Soviet-related armed conflict in the CENTCOM AOR
- OPLAN 1002 (Defense of the Arabian Peninsula).
- CENTCOM OPORDER 01-97, Force Protection
- SOCEUR SUPPLAN 1001-90, 9 May 1989
- CENTCOM CONPLAN 1010, July 2003
- CENTCOM CONPLAN 1015-98, possible support to OPLAN 5027 for Korea, 15 March 1991
- CENTCOM 1017, 1999
- CONPLAN 1020
- OPLAN 1021, prior to 1990, referred to "the ..Soviets pushing through Iran." OPLAN 1021-88 had a nuclear weapons annex, Annex C, that called for the deployment of some nuclear-capable forces. In September 1990, copying deployment lists from the Cold War planning in haste over to Desert Shield deployments after the Iraqi invasion of Kuwait appears to have inadvertently begun the deployment of a MGM-52 Lance short-range ballistic missile unit, 1st Battalion, 12th Field Artillery Regiment. "The unit's equipment was literally on railcars and ready to move to ports in Texas before the missilemen were ordered to stand down."
- CONPLAN 1067, for possible Biological Warfare response
- CENTCOM CONPLAN 1100-95, 31 March 1992

Others listed by Arkin's supplements include CENTCOM CONPLAN 1211-07 "Foreign Humanitarian Assistance / Disaster Response Operations." It was issued in November 2007, and required using the Request for Forces method via then-U.S. Joint Forces Command to supply any required forces.

== Geographic scope ==
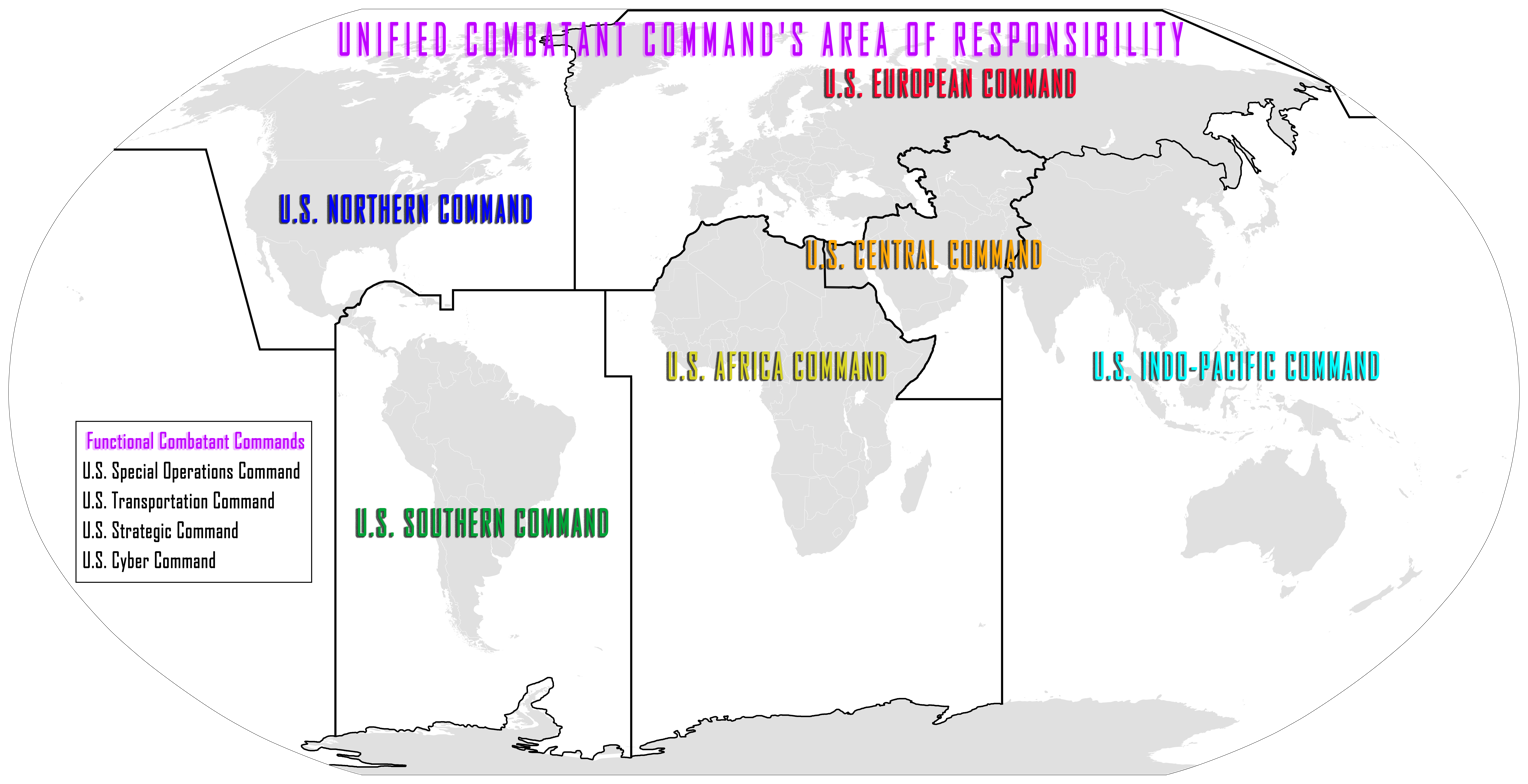
Current as of 1 June 2018

With the 1983 establishment of CENTCOM Egypt, Sudan, Kenya, Ethiopia, Somalia, and Djibouti came within the area of responsibility (AOR). Thus CENTCOM directed the 'Natural Bond' exercises with Sudan, the 'Eastern Wind' exercises with Somalia, and the 'Jade Tiger' exercises with Oman, Somalia, and Sudan. Exercise Jade Tiger involved the 31st Marine Expeditionary Unit with Oman from 29 November 1982 to 8 December 1982.

On 7 February 2007, plans were announced for the creation of a United States Africa Command which transferred responsibility for U.S. military operations across Africa to the new USAFRICOM, except for Egypt. On 1 October 2008, the Africa Command became operational and Combined Joint Task Force-Horn of Africa, the primary CENTCOM force on the continent, started reporting to AFRICOM at Stuttgart instead of CENTCOM in Tampa.

The Department of Defense uses a variable number of base locations depending on its level of operations. With ongoing warfare in Iraq and Afghanistan in 2003, the United States Air Force used 35 bases, while in 2006 it used 14, including four in Iraq. The United States Navy maintains one major base and one smaller installation, with extensive deployments afloat and ashore by U.S. Navy, U.S. Marine Corps and U.S. Coast Guard ships, aviation units and ground units.

== List of commanders ==
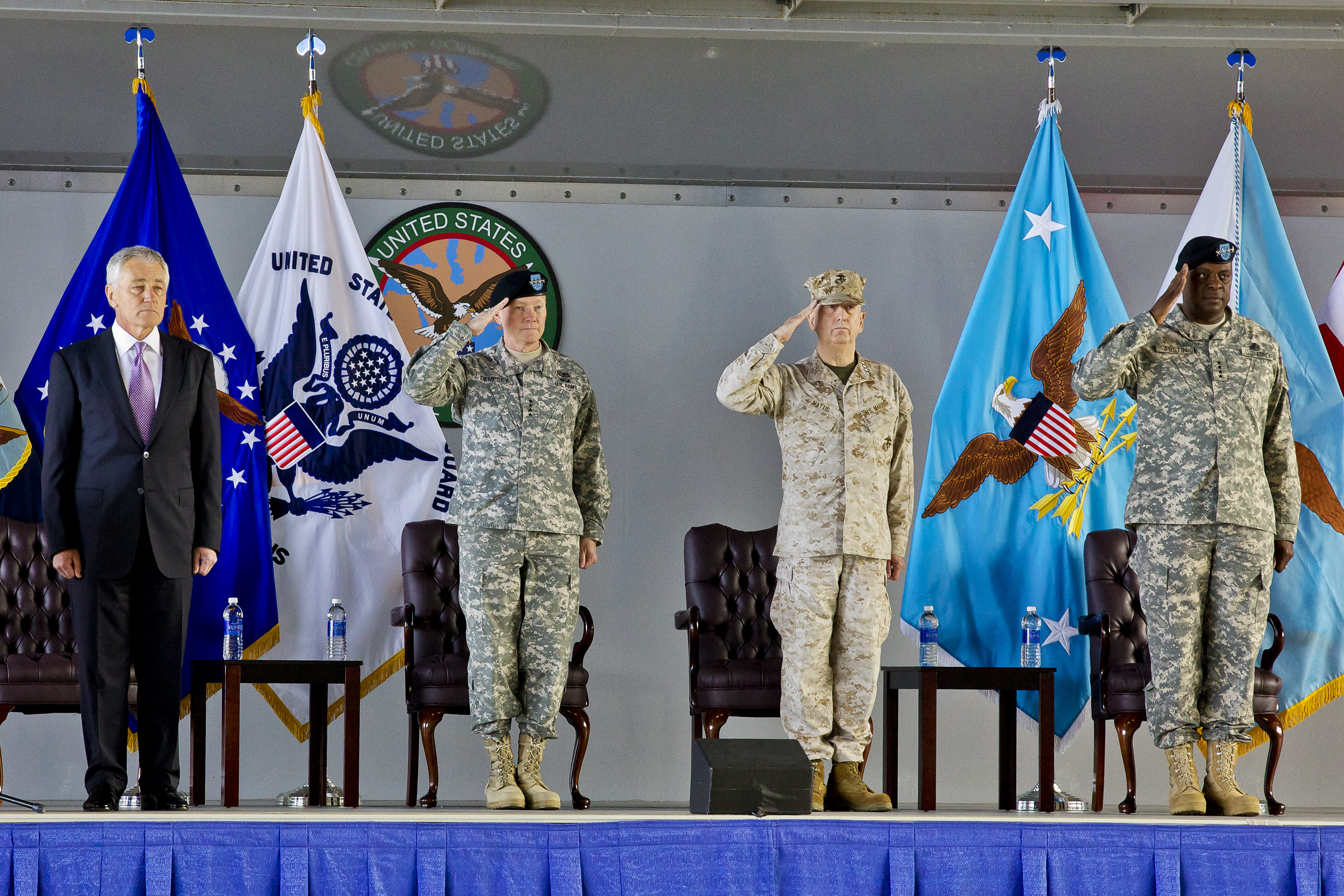
Outgoing commander James Mattis (second, from right) with incoming commander Lloyd Austin (first, from right) during the USCENTCOM change of command ceremony at MacDill Air Force Base, 22 March 2013

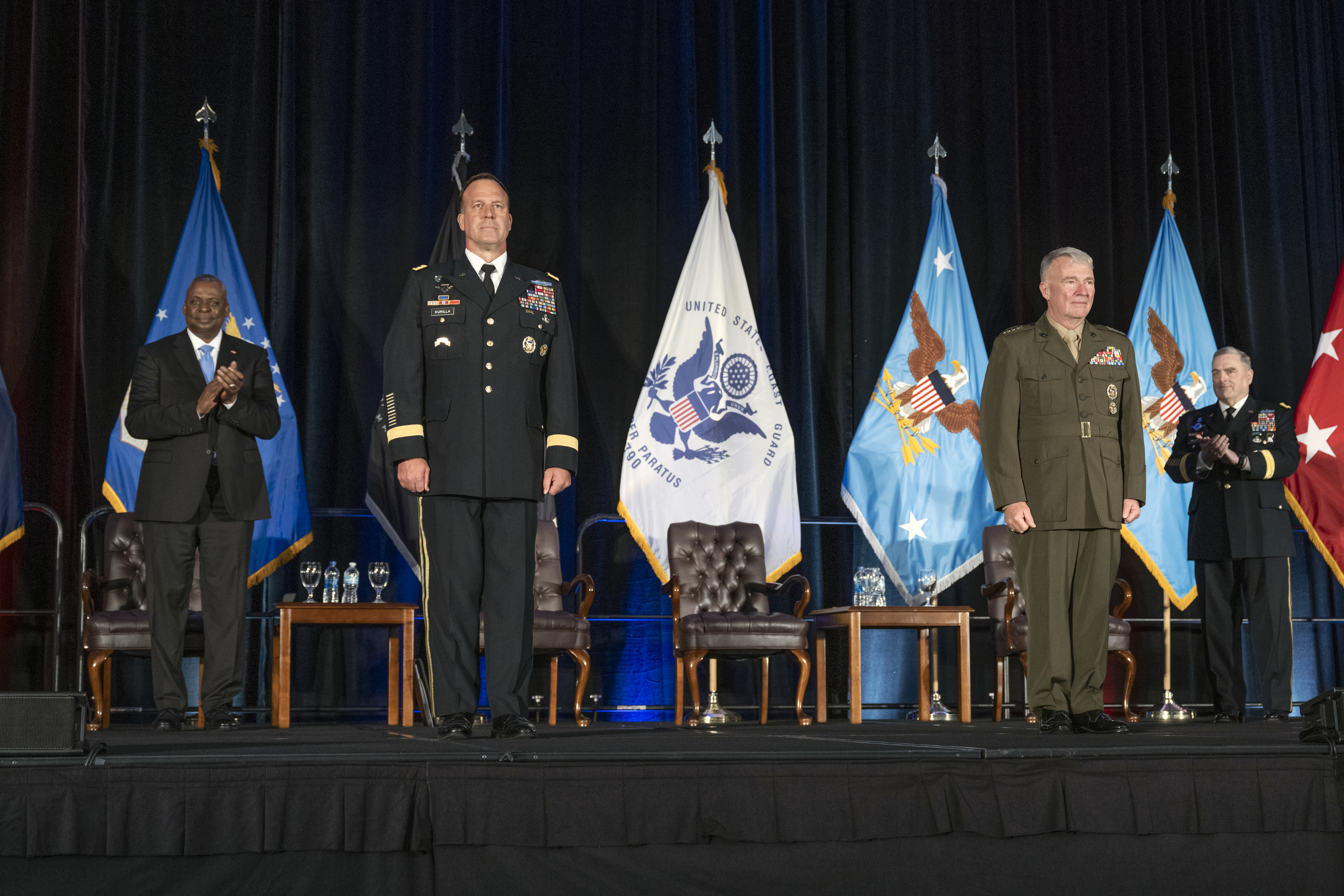
U.S. Secretary of Defense Lloyd Austin (extreme left), incoming combatant commander Michael Kurilla (center), outgoing commander Kenneth F. McKenzie Jr. (right) and Chairman of the Joint Chiefs of Staff Mark A. Milley (extreme right) at the USCENTCOM change of command ceremony on 1 April 2022

| No. | Commander | | Term | | | Service branch |
| No. | Portrait | Name | Took office | Left office | Term length | Service branch |
|---|---|---|---|---|---|---|
| 1 | Robert Kingston | General; Robert Kingston (1928–2007) | 1 January 1983 | 27 November 1985 | 2 years, 330 days | U.S. Army |
| 2 | George B. Crist | General; George B. Crist (1931–2024) | 27 November 1985 | 23 November 1988 | 2 years, 362 days | U.S. Marine Corps |
| 3 | Norman Schwarzkopf Jr. | General; Norman Schwarzkopf Jr. (1934–2012) | 23 November 1988 | 9 August 1991 | 2 years, 259 days | U.S. Army |
| 4 | Joseph P. Hoar | General; Joseph P. Hoar (1934–2022) | 9 August 1991 | 5 August 1994 | 2 years, 361 days | U.S. Marine Corps |
| 5 | J. H. Binford Peay III | General; J. H. Binford Peay III (born 1940) | 5 August 1994 | 13 August 1997 | 3 years, 8 days | U.S. Army |
| 6 | Anthony Zinni | General; Anthony Zinni (born 1943) | 13 August 1997 | 6 July 2000 | 2 years, 328 days | U.S. Marine Corps |
| 7 | Tommy Franks | General; Tommy Franks (born 1945) | 6 July 2000 | 7 July 2003 | 3 years, 1 day | U.S. Army |
| 8 | John Abizaid | General; John Abizaid (born 1951) | 7 July 2003 | 16 March 2007 | 3 years, 252 days | U.S. Army |
| 9 | William J. Fallon | Admiral; William J. Fallon (born 1944) | 16 March 2007 | 28 March 2008 | 1 year, 12 days | U.S. Navy |
| – | Martin Dempsey | Lieutenant General; Martin Dempsey (born 1952); Acting | 28 March 2008 | 31 October 2008 | 217 days | U.S. Army |
| 10 | David Petraeus | General; David Petraeus (born 1952) | 31 October 2008 | 30 June 2010 | 1 year, 242 days | U.S. Army |
| – | John R. Allen | Lieutenant General; John R. Allen (born 1953); Acting | 30 June 2010 | 11 August 2010 | 42 days | U.S. Marine Corps |
| 11 | Jim Mattis | General; Jim Mattis (born 1950) | 11 August 2010 | 22 March 2013 | 2 years, 223 days | U.S. Marine Corps |
| 12 | Lloyd Austin | General; Lloyd Austin (born 1953) | 22 March 2013 | 30 March 2016 | 3 years, 8 days | U.S. Army |
| 13 | Joseph Votel | General; Joseph Votel (born 1958) | 30 March 2016 | 28 March 2019 | 2 years, 363 days | U.S. Army |
| 14 | Kenneth F. McKenzie Jr. | General; Kenneth F. McKenzie Jr. (born 1957) | 28 March 2019 | 1 April 2022 | 3 years, 4 days | U.S. Marine Corps |
| 15 | Michael Kurilla | General; Michael Kurilla (born 1966) | 1 April 2022 | 8 August 2025 | 3 years, 129 days | U.S. Army |
| 16 | Brad Cooper | Admiral; Brad Cooper (born 1967) | 8 August 2025 | Incumbent | 1 year, 106 days | U.S. Navy |

=== Secretary of Defense ===
Two of the former U.S. Central Command Commanders would later serve as United States Secretary of Defense: General James Mattis and General Lloyd Austin. Mattis served as the 26th U.S. Secretary of Defense. Austin became the 28th U.S. Secretary of Defense on 22 January 2021, serving until 20 January 2025.

=== Unit decorations ===
The unit awards depicted below are for Headquarters, U.S. Central Command at MacDill AFB. Award for unit decorations do not apply to any subordinate organization such as the service component commands or any other activities unless the orders specifically address them.

| Award streamer | Award | Dates | Notes |
|---|---|---|---|
| | Joint Meritorious Unit Award | 2 August 1990 – 21 April 1991 | Department of the Army General Order (DAGO) 1991-22 & 1992-34 |
| | Joint Meritorious Unit Award | 1 August 1992 – 4 May 1993 | DAGO 1994-12 & 1996-01 |
| | Joint Meritorious Unit Award | 8 October 1994 – 16 March 1995 | DAGO 2001–25 |
| | Joint Meritorious Unit Award | 1 September 1996 – 6 January 1997 | Joint Staff Permanent Order (JSPO) J-ISO-0012-97 |
| | Joint Meritorious Unit Award | 1 October 1997 – 15 July 1998 | JSPO J-1SO-0241-98 |
| | Joint Meritorious Unit Award | 16 July 1998 – 1 November 1999 | JSPO J-1SO-0330-99 / DAGO 2001–25 |
| | Joint Meritorious Unit Award | 2 November 1999 – 15 March 2001 | |
| | Joint Meritorious Unit Award | 11 September 2001 – 1 May 2003 | DAGO 2005–09 |
| | Joint Meritorious Unit Award | 2 May 2003 – 31 December 2005 | |
| | Joint Meritorious Unit Award | 1 January 2006 – 1 March 2008 | JSPO J-1SO-0061-08 |
| | Joint Meritorious Unit Award | 2 March 2008 – 1 July 2010 | |
| | Joint Meritorious Unit Award | 2 July 2010 – 31 July 2012 | |

== See also ==
- Strategic Army Corps
- Bureau of Near Eastern Affairs, responsible State Department bureau
