= Battle of Qurah and Umm al Maradim =

1991 battle of the Persian Gulf War

Battles of Qurah and Umm al Maradim
- Part of the Persian Gulf War
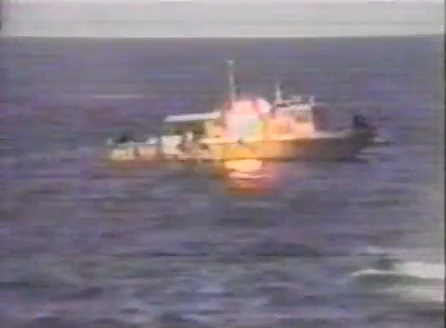
- An Iraqi Navy ship being destroyed by naval gunfire.
Date	24–29 January 1991 (5 days)
Location	Persian Gulf, Off the coast of Kuwait
Result	Coalition victory
Territorial changes	The Islands of Qurah and Umm al Maradim returned to Kuwaiti control

Belligerents
Iraq	United States; Kuwait

Commanders and leaders
(Ba'athist Iraq) Saddam Hussein	(United States) Norman Schwarzkopf (Kuwait) Jaber III

Strength
Several minelayers & minesweepers 1 patrol boat 100 ground troops	1 destroyer (USS Leftwich); 1 frigate (USS Curts); 2 A-6 attack aircraft

Casualties and losses
3+ killed 51 captured 1 minelayer sunk 2 minesweepers sunk 1 patrol boat sunk	Minor damage to helicopters

The Battle for Qurah and Umm al Maradim, were several naval and land battles for control over the islands off the coast of Kuwait in the Persian Gulf, mainly the islands of Qurah and Umm al Maradim.

== Qurah ==
Qurah was the first island to be retaken by Coalition Forces. On 24 January, two A-6's destroyed an enemy minelayer, a minesweeper, and a patrol boat near Qurah Island. A second minesweeper was sunk when it ran into one of their own mines, trying to evade the A-6s. Helicopters from USS Curts flew over the wreckage to pick up Iraqi survivors and take them back as POWs. As they picked up the survivors, Iraqi troops on Qurah fired at the helicopters forcing them to fall back, managing to get twenty-two survivors out of the water. USS Curts maneuvered itself in a position so that it could fire on the island's defenses. This started a six-hour battle to retake the first parcel of Kuwaiti Territory. USS Leftwich landed United States Navy SEALs on the island via helicopter, and by the time the gunfire had ceased, three Iraqi soldiers lay dead with fifty-one surrendering. There were no Coalition losses.

== Umm al Maradim ==
On 29 January, in the northern Persian Gulf, the five ships of Amphibious Ready Group (ARG) ALFA – USS Okinawa, USS Ogden, USS Fort McHenry, USS Cayuga and USS Durham steamed near the Kuwaiti island Umm al Maradim. United States Marines assaulted the 300-meter by 400-metre island 12 miles off the Kuwaiti coast using embarked Marine helicopter. After several hours of intense combat, the marines succeeded in liberating the second Kuwaiti island. After destroying Iraqi anti-aircraft weapons and artillery stored on the island, which had been used as an early warning post by the enemy, the Marines raised the Kuwaiti flag over the second parcel of reclaimed territory.
