= Exercise Internal Look =

Major planning wargame exercise of US Central Command

Internal Look is a biennial wargame exercise sponsored by the United States Joint Chiefs of Staff and coordinated by the United States Central Command. From 1983 to 1990, it was focused on rapid deployment of U.S. forces to the Zagros Mountains in Iran, where they would have attempted to stop an expected Soviet invasion by the Soviet Southern Strategic Direction. The Southern Strategic Direction, headquartered in Baku, would have consisted of the Transcaucasus Military District, North Caucasus Military District, Turkestan Military District and follow-on forces.

== 1990s ==
The exercise was held during July 1990, prior to the Iraqi invasion of Kuwait by Saddam Hussein's army. General Norman Schwarzkopf revised the original threat in the exercise to be the Saddam-commanded Iraqi Army. Accordingly, he tasked his operational staff to write a scenario where Iraq would attack Saudi Arabia.

The exercise was conducted by setting up a mock headquarters at Hurlburt Field and Duke Field in Florida, sponsored by the Joint Warfare Center (JWC) computer wargaming simulation agency. The scenario envisioned a force of 300,000 soldiers, 3,200 tanks and 640 combat planes being amassed in south Iraq prior to attacking the Arabian Peninsula. Central Command's operational role required them to prevent seizure of Saudi oil fields, shipping ports and refineries. The exercise helped inform decisions taken by Coalition forces during their initial buildup for Desert Shield, especially with regards to the logistic management of the forces.

Internal Look 96 commenced on March 20, 1996, at Camp Blanding, an Army National Guard facility near the town of Starke in northeast Florida. It was CENTCOM's largest domestic training exercise. The eight-day exercise involved approximately 4,000 active duty and reserve soldiers, sailors, airmen, Marines, and civilians from the Department of Defense and other supporting agencies.

Previously last held in 1990, Internal Look was scheduled at the time to become a biennial event. However, Internal Look 98 was cancelled due to events that led to Operation Desert Fox.

From 7–17 November 2000, CENTCOM executed Internal Look 01 by establishing a Contingency Forward Headquarters and simulating the execution of one of the principal plans. The exercise trialed a number of military messaging systems for SIPRNET and NIPRNET.

== 2000s ==
Internal Look '03, held in late 2002, allowed General Tommy Franks and his staff to practice Operation Iraqi Freedom.

== 2010s ==
In 2012, Internal Look was used to simulate the consequences of an Israeli strike on Iranian nuclear facilities, finding that this would lead to a regional conflict involving American forces.

According to The New York Times, Internal Look "forecast[ed] that the strike would lead to a wider regional war, which could draw in the United States and leave hundreds of Americans dead, according to American officials."

The exercise "played out a narrative in which the United States found it was pulled into the conflict after Iranian missiles struck a Navy warship in the Persian Gulf, killing about 200 Americans, according to officials with knowledge of the exercise. The United States then retaliated by carrying out its own strikes on Iranian nuclear facilities. The initial Israeli attack was assessed to have set back the Iranian nuclear program by roughly a year, and the subsequent American strikes did not slow the Iranian nuclear program by more than an additional two years. However, other Pentagon planners have said that America’s arsenal of long-range bombers, refueling aircraft and precision missiles could do far more damage to the Iranian nuclear program — if President Obama were to decide on a full-scale retaliation."
