= George B. Crist =

U.S. Marine Corps general (1931–2024)

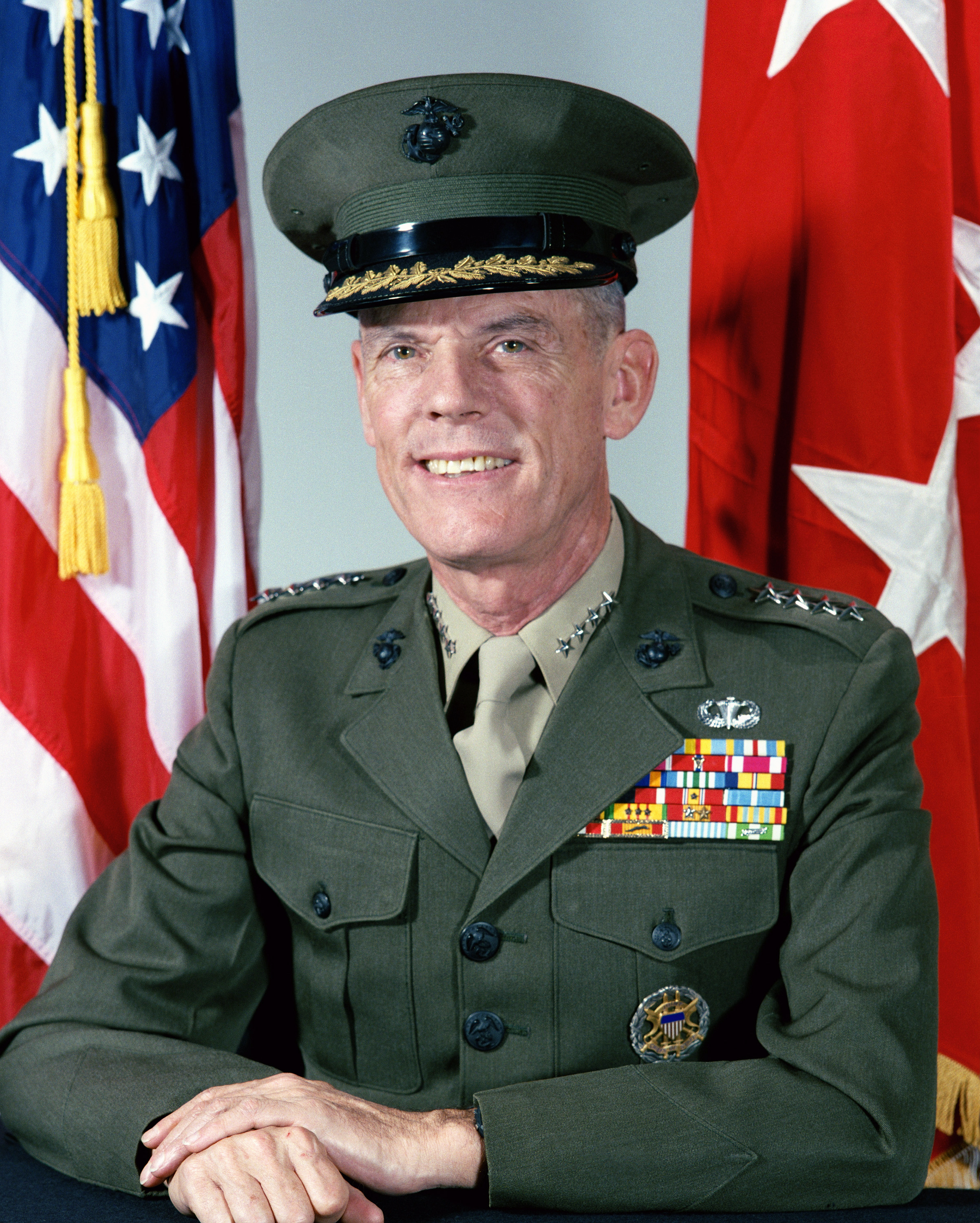
- Official portrait, 1985
- Born: January 23, 1931; Hartford, Connecticut, U.S.
- Died: July 26, 2024 (aged 93); Beaufort, South Carolina, U.S.
- Military career
- Allegiance: United States
- Branch: United States Marine Corps
- Service years: 1952–1988
- Rank: General
- Commands: United States Central Command; 2nd Battalion, 6th Marines
- Conflicts: Korean War; Vietnam War
- Awards: Defense Distinguished Service Medal (2); Defense Superior Service Medal; Legion of Merit; Bronze Star with Combat V device
- Other work: CBS military analyst

George Brainard Crist (January 23, 1931 – July 26, 2024) was an American general who served as the Commander-in-Chief of the United States Central Command from 1985 until his retirement in 1988. He was the first four-star general of the United States Marine Corps who was not either the commandant or the assistant commandant, and was the first Marine to lead one of the combatant commands.

== Biography ==
George B. Crist was born on January 23, 1931, in Hartford, Connecticut. His father was a career Navy officer.

Crist graduated cum laude from Villanova University in 1952, where he was in the NROTC. Later, he received an honorary doctorate from Villanova; and he was honored with Villanova's Alumni Medallion in 1981.

=== Marine Corps career ===
Crist was commissioned a second lieutenant in the U.S. Marine Corps in 1952. While a lieutenant, he served in all three active duty Marine divisions. During the Korean War, he served with the 1st Marine Division in Korea.

He returned to the United States in 1955, was promoted to captain and ordered to Marine Barracks, Washington, D.C., where he served as a White House aide under President Eisenhower. In 1959, he graduated from the Advanced Infantry Officers' School, Fort Benning, Georgia, and joined the newly formed U.S. Naval Mission to the Republic of Haiti.

By 1963, Crist had returned to the 2nd Marine Division, where he deployed with an infantry battalion to the Caribbean during the 1962 Cuban Missile Crisis. Later, as Assistant Division G-3, he completed airborne training at Fort Benning.

His first tour in Vietnam came in 1965. As an advisor to the Vietnamese Joint General Staff, he participated in combat operations throughout the Republic of Vietnam.

In 1966, he became aide-de-camp to the Chairman of the Joint Chiefs of Staff. While in that assignment he was promoted to lieutenant colonel.

Following his graduation from the Armed Forces Staff College in 1968, he commanded the 2nd Battalion, 6th Marines at Camp Lejeune, North Carolina. In 1971, he completed the Air War College as a distinguished graduate, concurrently receiving a master's degree in Political Science from Auburn University. The next year, he returned to the Far East, serving first as a battalion commander in the 3rd Marine Division and then with the 9th Marine Amphibious Brigade, assisting in the defense of South Vietnam during the 1972 North Vietnamese Easter Offensive.

When he returned to the U.S., he spent three years at Headquarters Marine Corps in Plans and Programs. While in Washington D.C., he was promoted to colonel.

In the summer of 1975, Crist was ordered to Headquarters, Fleet Marine Force (FMF), Atlantic, Norfolk, Virginia, where he served as Assistant Chief of Staff, G-3, Chief of Staff, and following his promotion to brigadier general, as Deputy Commander.

In 1978, he was transferred to Europe as the deputy director of Operations (J-3), U.S. European Command, where he was actively involved in a series of crisis actions ranging from Iran to Africa.

In 1980, Crist was promoted to major general and returned to the United States as the Deputy Chief of Staff for Reserve Affairs. This was followed two years later by a tour with the Joint Chiefs of Staff as the Vice Director, Joint Staff. On October 23, 1983, during a weekend of international crises at the White House, Crist was secretly dispatched from Washington to assist six Caribbean states organize a 300-man Caribbean Peace Force to support the surprise, U.S.-led invasion of Grenada on October 25. For the next five days, Crist served as the on-scene military liaison between the regional peacekeepers and the White House, the Pentagon, the State Department, and the CIA. On November 2, after his return to Washington, Crist testified before a Congressional subcommittee on the weapons that were captured from Cubans and Grenadians by American troops in the course of the eight days of hostilities.

In 1984, he was promoted to the rank of lieutenant general and served as the Deputy Chief of Staff for Installations and Logistics and Quartermaster General and then as Chief of Staff, Headquarters Marine Corps.

Crist was promoted to the grade of general in November 1985—the first active-duty Marine to achieve that rank without serving as Commandant or Assistant Commandant of the Corps—and on November 27, 1985, he assumed command of the U.S. Central Command (CENTCOM), MacDill Air Force Base, Florida. At CENTCOM, he helped to run Operation Earnest Will, the escort of reflagged Kuwaiti tankers; Operation Prime Chance, the secret actions against Iranian naval forces; and Operation Praying Mantis, the April 18, 1988, retaliation for the Iranian mining of the USS Samuel B. Roberts.

Crist retired from active duty in December 1988 after more than 36 years of service. Following retirement, he became a military consultant for CBS news in 1990, appearing on national television and radio throughout the Gulf War and during subsequent crises in Africa and the Middle East.

=== Personal life and death ===
Crist and his wife, Barbara (née Clay), moved to Beaufort, South Carolina, in 1990 after they restored an old house in the Historic District.

Crist earned a BA, cum laude, from Villanova University, an MS in political science from Auburn University, and was awarded an honorary Doctor of Military Science by Villanova University.

George and Barbara had two sons, William and David.

Crist died in Beaufort on July 26, 2024, at the age of 93.

== Awards and decorations ==
His military decorations included two awards of the Defense Distinguished Service Medal, the Defense Superior Service Medal, the Legion of Merit, the Bronze Star Medal, two individual awards of the Air Medal, and the Joint Service Commendation Medal. Foreign decorations include the Egyptian Meritorious Badge of Honor of the First Degree, the Vietnamese Cross of Gallantry with silver and bronze stars, and the Vietnamese Honor Medal.

US Army Basic Parachutist Badge
1st Row	Defense Distinguished Service Medal w/ 1 award star	Defense Superior Service Medal	Legion of Merit		Office of the Joint Chiefs of Staff Identification Badge
2nd Row	Bronze Star w/ valor device	Meritorious Service Medal	Air Medal w/ 1 award star	Joint Service Commendation Medal	Office of the Joint Chiefs of Staff Identification Badge
3rd Row	Combat Action Ribbon	Navy Occupation Service Medal	National Defense Service Medal w/ 1 service star	Korean Service Medal	Office of the Joint Chiefs of Staff Identification Badge
4th Row	Armed Forces Expeditionary Medal	Vietnam Service Medal w/ 3 service stars	Vietnam Gallantry Cross w/ silver & bronze stars	Vietnam Armed Forces Honor Medal	Office of the Joint Chiefs of Staff Identification Badge
5th Row	Presidential Unit Citation (Philippines)	Vietnam Gallantry Cross unit citation	United Nations Korea Medal	Vietnam Campaign Medal	Office of the Joint Chiefs of Staff Identification Badge

== See also ==
- List of United States Marine Corps four-star generals

== Notes ==
Military offices
Preceded by Robert C. Kingston	Commander-in-Chief of United States Central Command; 1985–1988	Succeeded by H. Norman Schwarzkopf
