= Norman Schwarzkopf Jr. =

United States Army general (1934–2012)

Norman Schwarzkopf
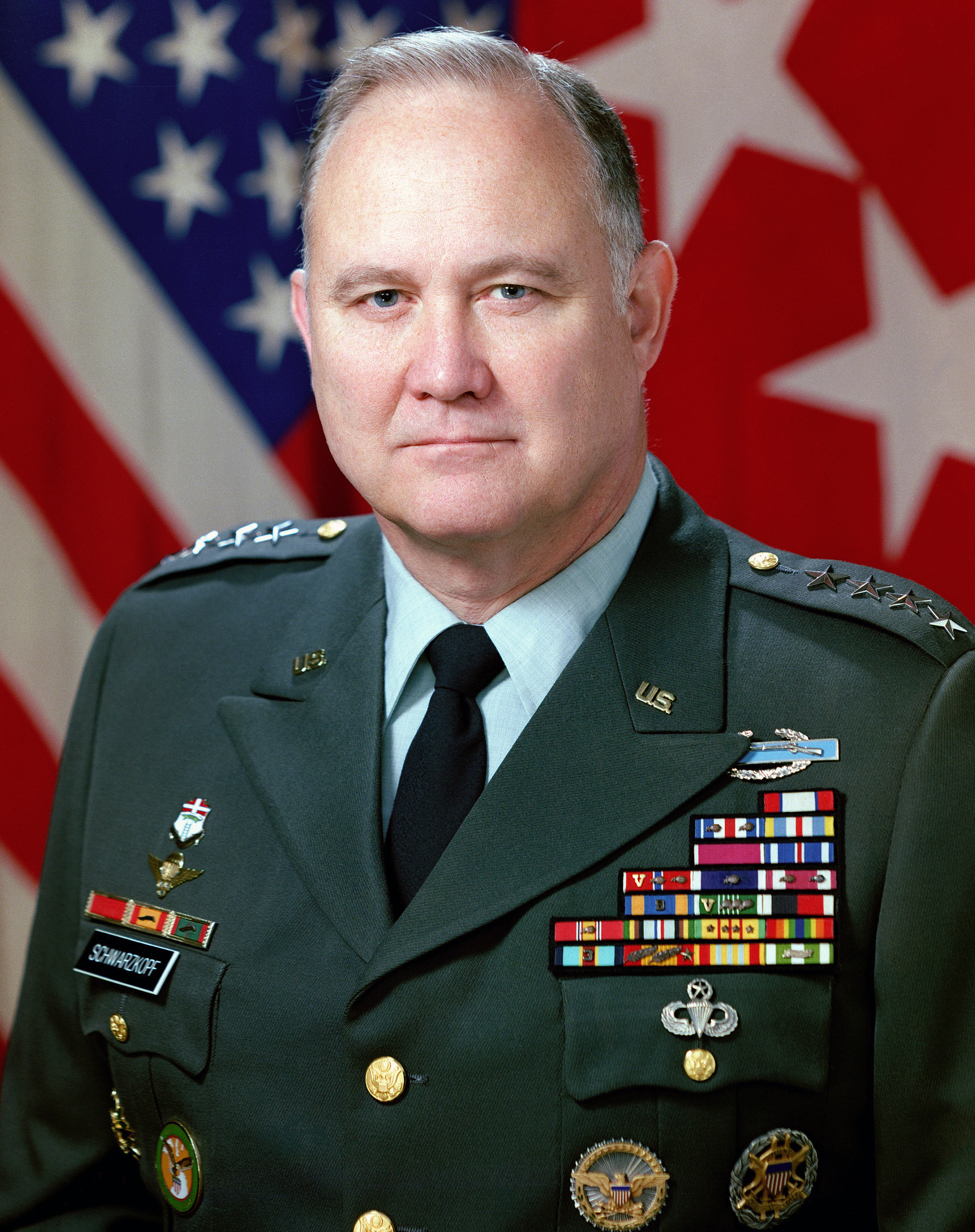
- Official portrait, 1988
- Born: Herbert Norman Schwarzkopf Jr. 22 August 1934; Trenton, New Jersey, U.S.
- Died: 27 December 2012 (aged 78); Tampa, Florida, U.S.
- Burial place: West Point Cemetery, New York, U.S.
- Education: United States Military Academy (BS); University of Southern California (MEng)
- Spouse: Brenda Holsinger (m. 1968)
- Children: 3
- Relatives: Norman Schwarzkopf Sr.
- Military career
- Allegiance: United States
- Branch: United States Army
- Service years: 1956–1991
- Rank: General
- Nicknames: "Stormin' Norman"; "The Bear"
- Commands: United States Central Command; I Corps; 24th Mechanized Infantry Division; 1st Brigade, 9th Infantry Division; 1st Battalion, 6th Infantry Regiment
- Conflicts: List of conflicts and battles: Vietnam War; Invasion of Grenada; Gulf War; Battle of Ad-Dawrah; Attack on Ras Tanura; Battle of Qurah and Umm al Maradim; Battle of Bubiyan; Battle of Khafji; Battle of Wadi al-Batin; Highway of Death; Battle of 73 Easting; Battle of Al Busayyah; Battle of Phase Line Bullet; Battle of Medina Ridge; Battle of Norfolk; Battle of Rumaila
- Awards: Defense Distinguished Service Medal; Army Distinguished Service Medal (3); Navy Distinguished Service Medal; Air Force Distinguished Service Medal; Coast Guard Distinguished Service Medal; Silver Star (3); Defense Superior Service Medal; Legion of Merit; Distinguished Flying Cross; Bronze Star Medal (3); Purple Heart (2); Presidential Medal of Freedom; Congressional Gold Medal; Knight Commander of the Order of the Bath (Honorary)

Herbert Norman Schwarzkopf Jr. KCB (/ˈʃwɔːrtskɒf/ SHWORTS-kof; 22 August 1934 – 27 December 2012) was a United States Army general. While serving as the commander of United States Central Command, he led all coalition forces in the Gulf War against Ba'athist Iraq.

Born in Trenton, New Jersey, Schwarzkopf grew up in the United States and later in Iran. He was accepted by the United States Military Academy and was commissioned as a second lieutenant in the United States Army in 1956. After a number of initial training programs, Schwarzkopf interrupted a stint as an academy teacher and served in the Vietnam War, first as an adviser to the South Vietnamese Army and then as a battalion commander. Schwarzkopf was highly decorated in Vietnam and was awarded three Silver Stars, two Purple Hearts, and the Legion of Merit. Rising through the ranks after the Vietnam war, he later commanded the 24th Mechanized Infantry Division and was one of the commanders of the invasion of Grenada.

Assuming command of United States Central Command in 1988, Schwarzkopf was called on to respond to the invasion of Kuwait in 1990 by the forces of Iraq under Saddam Hussein. Initially tasked with defending Saudi Arabia from Iraqi aggression, Schwarzkopf's command eventually grew to an international force of more than 750,000 troops. After diplomatic relations broke down, he planned and led Operation Desert Storm, an extended air campaign followed by a highly successful 100-hour ground offensive, which defeated the Iraqi Army and removed Iraqi troops from Kuwait in early 1991. Schwarzkopf was presented with military honors. He was, like his father, a freemason. He was also a Shriner and was a member of ANSAR Shrine until his death.

Schwarzkopf retired shortly after the end of the war and undertook philanthropic ventures, only occasionally stepping into the political spotlight before his death from complications of pneumonia. A hard-driving military commander, easily angered, Schwarzkopf was considered an exceptional leader by many biographers and was noted for his abilities as a military diplomat and in dealing with the press.

== Early life and education ==
Schwarzkopf was born Herbert Norman Schwarzkopf Jr. on 22 August 1934, in Trenton, New Jersey, to Herbert Norman Schwarzkopf Sr. and Ruth Alice (née Bowman). His father was a 1917 graduate of the United States Military Academy and veteran of World War I. His mother was a housewife from West Virginia who was distantly related to Thomas Jefferson. The senior Schwarzkopf later became the founding Superintendent of the New Jersey State Police, where he worked as a lead investigator on the 1932 Lindbergh baby kidnapping case. In January 1952, the younger Schwarzkopf's birth certificate was amended to make his name "H. Norman Schwarzkopf", reportedly because his father detested his first name. (Note: At the time of the change, the "H." in Schwarzkopf's did not stand for anything. The "Jr." was also deleted from his name. Then, Schwarzkopf was normally referred to as "Norman". For clarity, this article refers to Herbert Norman Schwarzkopf Sr. as "Herbert Schwarzkopf" and H. Norman Schwarzkopf as "Norman Schwarzkopf".) The younger Schwarzkopf had two elder sisters, Ruth Ann (a civil rights and antiwar activist) and Sally Joan.

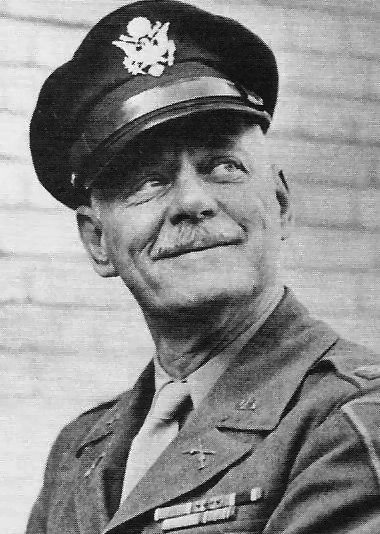
Herbert Norman Schwarzkopf Sr., father of H. Norman Schwarzkopf

Norman Schwarzkopf was described by childhood friends as active and assertive, protective of his sisters and a skilled athlete. He spent his childhood attached to his father, who subsequently became the narrator for the Gang Busters radio program. When Norman Schwarzkopf was eight years old, his father returned to the military amid World War II. His continuous absence made home life difficult, particularly for his wife. As a 10-year-old cadet at Bordentown Military Institute, near Trenton, he posed for his official photograph wearing a stern expression because, as he said afterwards, "Some day when I become a general, I want people to know that I'm serious".

In 1946, when Norman Schwarzkopf was 12, he moved with his father to Tehran, Iran. In Iran, he learned shooting, horseback riding, and hunting. Schwarzkopf developed a lifelong interest in Middle Eastern culture. The family moved to Geneva, Switzerland, in 1947, following a new military assignment for Herbert Schwarzkopf. The senior Schwarzkopf visited Italy, Heidelberg, Frankfurt, and Berlin, Germany, during his military duties, and the younger Schwarzkopf accompanied him. By 1951 he had returned to Iran briefly before returning to the United States. Herbert Schwarzkopf died in 1958. From a young age, Norman wanted to be a military officer, following his father's example.

He attended the Community High School in Tehran, later the International School of Geneva, and briefly Frankfurt American High School in Frankfurt, Germany (1948–49), and Heidelberg American High School in Heidelberg, Germany (1949–50). He eventually graduated from Valley Forge Military Academy in 1952. (Note: In May 1989, he gave the commencement address at the Valley Forge Military Academy.) He was also a member of Mensa. Schwarzkopf graduated valedictorian out of his class of 150, and his IQ was alleged to have tested at 168. Schwarzkopf then attended the United States Military Academy where he played football, wrestled, sang and conducted the West Point Chapel choir. His large frame (6 feet 3 inches (1.91 m) in height and 240 pounds (110 kg) in weight) was advantageous in athletics.

In his plebe year, he was given the nickname "Schwarzie", the same as his father, and he was often pushed by older cadets to imitate his father's radio show as a traditional act of hazing. Schwarzkopf gained great respect for certain military leaders at West Point, notably Ulysses S. Grant, William Tecumseh Sherman and Creighton Abrams, believing them to be excellent commanders who nonetheless did not glorify war. He graduated 43rd of 480 in the class of 1956 with a Bachelor of Science degree. Later, Schwarzkopf earned a Master of Engineering at the University of Southern California. (Note: Schwarzkopf's degree did not include a specific major, as was then common among West Point graduates, because he planned a career in the military and wanted a degree of freedom to choose its direction himself.)

== Career ==
=== Junior officer ===
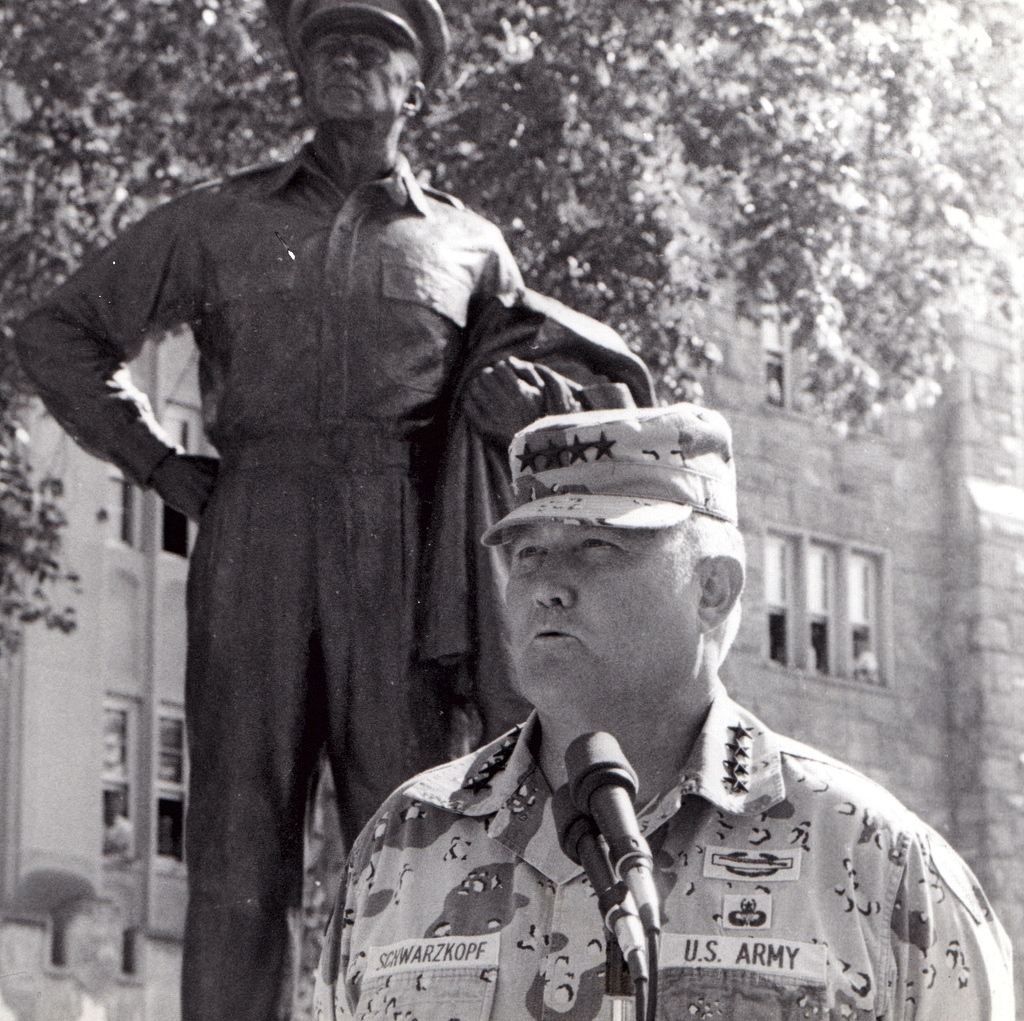
Schwarzkopf speaking at West Point in the shadow of the Douglas MacArthur statue

Commissioned into the Army as an Infantry second lieutenant, Schwarzkopf reported to the United States Army Infantry School at Fort Benning, Georgia, where he attended the Infantry Officer Basic Course and earned his Parachutist Badge from October 1956 to March 1957. His first assignment was as a platoon leader and later executive officer of E Company, 2nd Airborne Battle Group, 187th Airborne Infantry Regiment, 101st Airborne Division, at Fort Campbell, Kentucky. He later recounted that it was then that he found chronic problems in military leadership, amid what historians have called a larger doctrinal crisis. Schwarzkopf later said there were many officers and NCOs he met on that assignment who "had no sense of duty or honor, and who saw the world through an alcoholic haze".

He was promoted to first lieutenant in 1958. In July 1959, Schwarzkopf was assigned his first overseas assignment. He was a staff officer alternating with duties as a platoon leader, liaison officer, and reconnaissance platoon leader with the 6th Infantry Regiment in West Germany. In July 1960, Schwarzkopf was assigned as aide-de-camp to Brigadier General Charles Johnson who commanded the Berlin Brigade in West Berlin.

Schwarzkopf was promoted to captain in July 1961 and attended the Advanced Infantry School at Fort Benning for eight months and qualified for the Master Parachutist Badge. In June 1962, Schwarzkopf enrolled at the University of Southern California in a Master of Science in Engineering course studying missile mechanics. He graduated in June 1964 with a Master of Science in mechanical and aerospace engineering. He then returned to West Point to serve an obligatory tour as an instructor in the Department of Mechanics. He was assigned to teach at the Military Academy for three years, but after a year he volunteered for service in South Vietnam for faster career advancement with a combat tour. West Point approved his request in early 1965, stipulating that he would return and complete his remaining obligation afterwards.

=== Vietnam War ===
In the Vietnam War, Schwarzkopf served as a task force adviser to the Army of the Republic of Vietnam Airborne Division. He was promoted to major shortly after arriving in Vietnam. After an initial orientation at Military Assistance Command, Vietnam (MACV), headquartered in Saigon, Schwarzkopf was sent north to Pleiku in the central highlands, in the II Corps Tactical Zone. He got his first combat experience on 3 August, when he was the senior adviser to a force of 1,000 South Vietnamese paratroopers sent to relieve a beleaguered South Vietnamese Army force at Đức Cơ Camp. The paratroopers took heavy casualties and a second, larger force was required to relieve them. That force too came into heavy contact. Schwarzkopf and his group fought continuously for several days. At one point, he braved heavy North Vietnamese fire to recover and treat a handful of wounded South Vietnamese soldiers and escort them to safety.

By 17 August, the 173rd Airborne Brigade arrived and broke the siege, ending the Battle of Đức Cơ. General William Westmoreland later arrived to review the battle and congratulate Schwarzkopf. For his leadership in the battle, Schwarzkopf was awarded the Silver Star. On 14 February 1966, Schwarzkopf led an ARVN paratrooper assault on a Viet Cong position, during which he was wounded four times by small arms fire. However, he refused medical evacuation or to relinquish command until the objective had been captured and so he was awarded a second Silver Star and a Purple Heart.

After ten months of combat duty, Schwarzkopf was pulled from the front by MACV and reassigned as senior staff adviser for civil affairs to the ARVN Airborne Division. He returned to the United States and finished his teaching assignment at West Point where he was an associate professor in the Department of Mechanics. In 1968 he attended the Army's Command and General Staff College at Fort Leavenworth, Kansas, completing the course in June 1969. During this time he met Brenda Holsinger, a flight attendant for Trans World Airlines. They were introduced at a West Point football game in 1967 and married the next year. The couple would later have three children: Cynthia, born in 1970; Jessica, born in 1972; and Christian, born in 1977.

In 1969, Schwarzkopf was promoted to lieutenant colonel and ordered to a second tour in Vietnam, leaving in June. He was assigned as executive officer to the chief of staff at MACV headquarters based at Tan Son Nhut Air Base in Saigon. Schwarzkopf later recalled this second tour of duty was very different from his first. There were now 500,000 U.S. troops in Vietnam, the strategy of Vietnamization was in full effect, and recent events such as the Tet Offensive and My Lai massacre had put U.S. combat troops under increased political scrutiny. In December 1969, he got his first field command, taking over the 1st Battalion, 6th Infantry, 198th Infantry Brigade at Chu Lai. He later said that the troops were initially demoralized and in poor condition, racked with rampant drug use and disciplinary problems as well as a lack of support from home.

Despite the brigade's otherwise-controversial performance record, Schwarzkopf was quickly regarded as one of its best combat commanders. He aggressively stepped up patrols and operations to counter Viet Cong infiltration in the battalion's sector. He developed his leadership attitudes during this command. Fellow commander Hal Moore later wrote that during his time in Vietnam, Schwarzkopf acquired his well-known short temper, and argued via radio for passing American helicopters to land and pick up his wounded men. He also showed a preference of leading from the front and prided himself on avoiding the rear areas, which he termed a "cesspool".

During this second tour, Schwarzkopf noted two incidents that haunted him. On 17 February 1970, two men in C Company, 1st Battalion, 6th Infantry were killed by friendly fire from an American artillery shell that had been called in by Schwarzkopf but had struck a tree near their position on its way to a target. The parents of one soldier blamed him for the death of their son, a claim that Schwarzkopf strongly denied and termed an accident of war. On 28 May 1970, Schwarzkopf landed his helicopter when discovering troops of B Company who had stumbled into a minefield. Two company officers had been wounded and two soldiers were trapped, fearful of setting off more mines. Although a medevac was on its way, Schwarzkopf ordered his UH-1 Huey to remove the wounded. As he attempted to help the troops back out of the field, one soldier struck a landmine, breaking a leg, and began to panic. Fearing that he would set off another landmine, Schwarzkopf pinned the soldier to the ground while another soldier put a splint on the wounded man's leg. In doing so, another mine was set off, killing three and wounding Schwarzkopf's artillery officer.

Returning to the United States in 1970, Schwarzkopf was awarded a third Silver Star and a second Purple Heart for risking his life to protect the soldiers, as well as three Bronze Star Medals and a Legion of Merit for his command performance. Still, his experiences in Vietnam embittered him to foreign policy. Upon returning to the United States, he spoke of a wariness of future conflicts to author C. D. B. Bryan in 1971. He related those experiences under his real name, which was changed to Lieutenant Colonel Byron Schindler for the made-for-TV movie Friendly Fire in 1979.

I don't think there will ever be another major confrontation where the armies line up on both sides. If that happens, it's inevitably going to be nuclear weapons and the whole thing. So I think all wars of the future are going to be—and again, God forbid, I hope we don't have any. War is a profanity, it really is. It's terrifying. Nobody is more anti-war than an intelligent person who's been to war. Probably the most anti-war people I know are Army officers—but if we do have a war, I think it's going to be limited in nature like Vietnam and Korea. Limited in scope. And when they get ready to send me again, I'm going to have to stop and ask myself, "is it worth it?" That's a very dangerous place for the nation to be when your own army is going to stop and question.

=== Rise to General ===
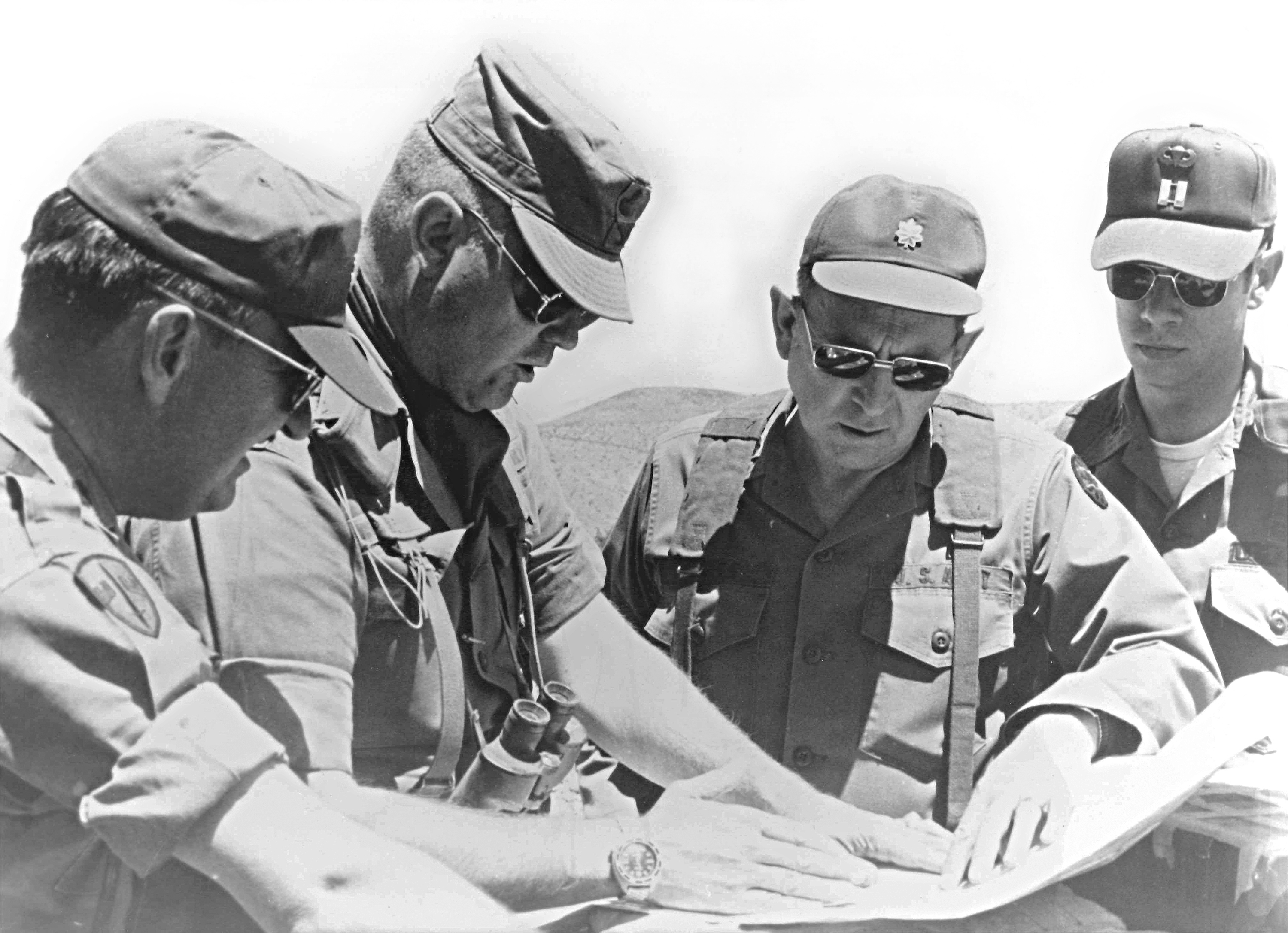
Schwarzkopf, then a colonel, consults with other officers during a training mission in California in 1977

Disgruntled by the treatment of Vietnam veterans in the United States after the war, Schwarzkopf considered leaving the military. He was especially unsettled by the Army War College investigation that had demonstrated a severe erosion of adherence to the army's officer code of "Duty, Honor, Country". The report, entitled Study on Military Professionalism, had a profound influence on Army policies. Schwarzkopf ultimately decided to stay in the hope of fixing some of the problems encountered by the military during the war. He underwent surgery at Walter Reed Army Hospital shortly after his return from Vietnam to repair longstanding back problems exacerbated by parachute jumps.

Between 1970 and 1983, Schwarzkopf took on a number of different assignments. Promoted to colonel, Schwarzkopf volunteered for an assignment in Alaska, and in late 1974 became deputy commander of the 172nd Infantry Brigade at Fort Richardson, Alaska. In 1975, Col Schwarzkopf served as Commander of Troop E, 1st Squadron, 1st Cavalry Regiment, at Fort Wainwright, AK. Subsequently, in October 1976, he moved to Fort Lewis, Washington, to command the 1st Brigade of the 9th Infantry Division, where he impressed his division commander, Major General Richard E. Cavazos. The two frequently hunted together and developed a close friendship. Having been very successful in improving the combat readiness of the 1st Brigade, he was nominated to receive his first star as a brigadier general. His promotion ceremony occurred at Fort Lewis shortly after he had relinquished command of the brigade.

In July 1978, Schwarzkopf became deputy director of plans at the U.S. Pacific Command in Hawaii. He then served a two-year stint as assistant division commander of the 8th Infantry Division (Mechanized) in Germany. He returned to Washington, DC, for an assignment as director of personnel management for the Army, subordinate to the Deputy Chief of Staff for Personnel, General Maxwell R. Thurman. Schwarzkopf was promoted to major general. In June 1983, he became commanding general of the 24th Infantry Division (Mechanized) at Fort Stewart, Georgia. He immediately established an extremely rigorous training regimen and became well known among the troops of the command for his strict training and aggressive personality.

On 25 October 1983, Schwarzkopf was appointed to the command group for the Invasion of Grenada. He was the chief army adviser to the overall operation commander, Vice Admiral Joseph Metcalf III, Commander, United States Second Fleet/Commander Joint Task Force 120. The operation was plagued by logistical difficulties, exacerbated by poor communication and lack of co-operation between the branches of the United States military. Schwarzkopf was named deputy commander of the invasion at the last minute, leaving him with little say in the planning. Schwarzkopf helped lead the initial landing operations while he was aboard USS Guam. He was involved in an incident where the colonel commanding the 22nd Marine Expeditionary Unit initially refused to fly Army troops in Marine helicopters.

He flew into St. George's on the second day of the operation. While he initially did not think the US should have been involved in the conflict, he later said he considered the mission a success because it reasserted the dominance of the US military after the Vietnam War. Following the invasion, Schwarzkopf returned to the 24th Infantry Division and completed his tour as its commander. He was then among the leaders who were criticized for the poor interservice co-operation in the operation, particularly the poor communication between forces of the different branches in combat. The operation was a learning experience for Schwarzkopf, who saw the need to develop greater co-operation between the services for future joint operations. He would later push for more policies to make joint warfare, and interservice co-operation standard practice in warfare. Specifically, the operation demonstrated a need for greater joint roles in planning, deploying troops, and communicating operations. Subsequent operations gave more authority to joint commanders in operations and doctrine and emphasized joint warfare doctrine over service-centered doctrine.

In July 1985, Schwarzkopf began an 11-month assignment as Assistant Deputy Chief of Staff for Operations and Plans at the Pentagon. On 1 July 1986, he was promoted to lieutenant general, and was reassigned to Fort Lewis as commander of I Corps. He held the post for 14 months before returning to the Pentagon as Deputy Chief of Staff for Operations and Plans in August 1987. In a second role, Schwarzkopf served as the Army's senior member on the Military Staff Committee at the United Nations Security Council, where he began to build diplomatic skills in dealings with representatives from other countries. As a part of his duties during the posting, he sat in on arms reduction talks with leaders from the Soviet Union.

==== CENTCOM commander ====
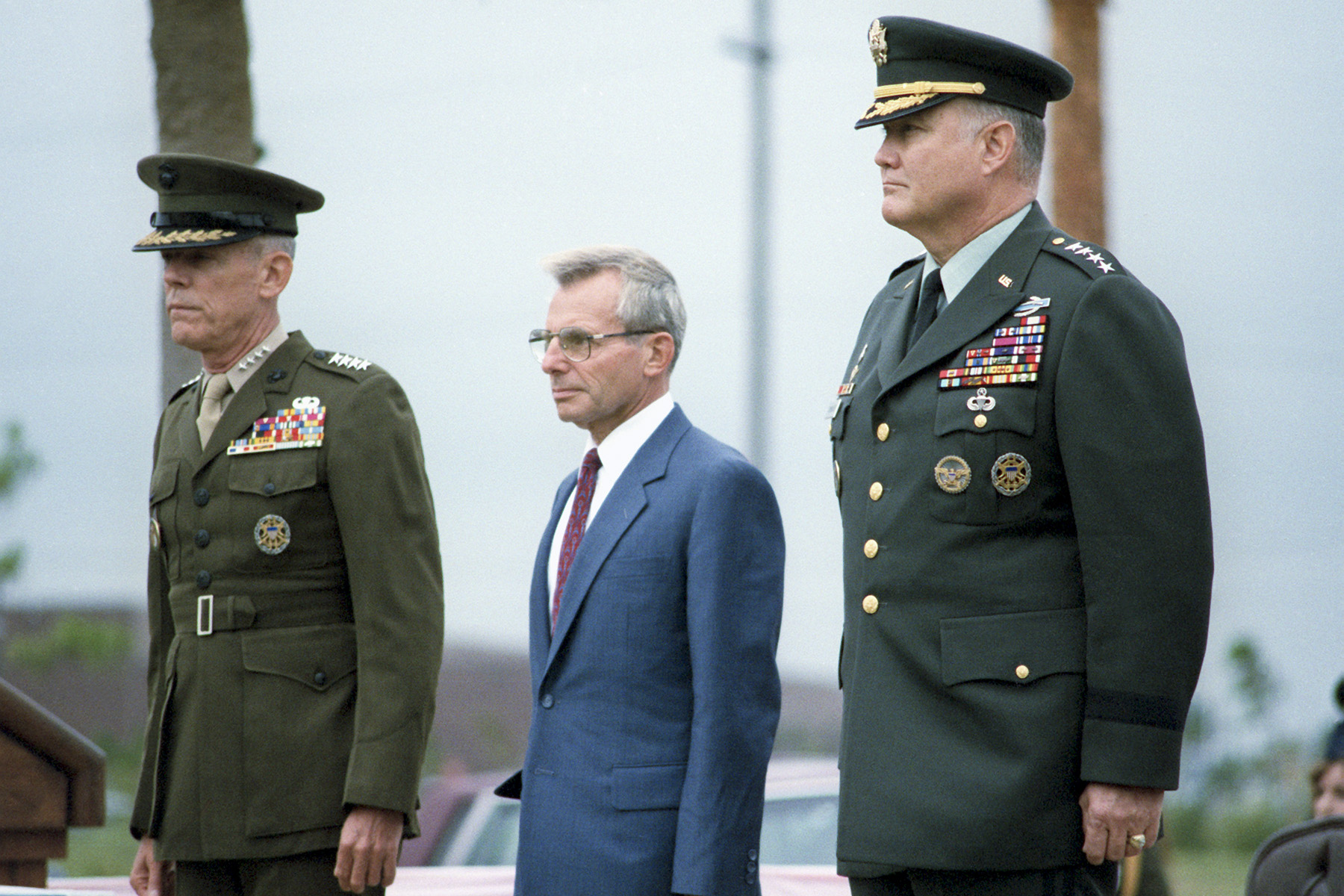
Schwarzkopf (right) takes command of United States Central Command in November 1988

In November 1988, Schwarzkopf was named commander of United States Central Command (CENTCOM), succeeding General George B. Crist. Schwarzkopf was selected over a more popular choice, Vice Admiral Henry C. Mustin, because commanders considered him an accomplished strategic thinker who had experience both in combat and with diplomacy and had great knowledge of the Middle East from his childhood experiences there. He assumed command of CENTCOM, with his headquarters at MacDill Air Force Base in Tampa, Florida, and was promoted to general. At the time of this appointment, CENTCOM had overall responsibility for U.S. military operations in 19 countries, and had 200,000 service members on call should a crisis arise. Schwarzkopf immediately took to changing the focus of the command, which had focused on a hypothetical ground invasion by the Soviet Union through the Zagros Mountains, which the US would counter in Iran. Schwarzkopf was more concerned with the effects of the Iran–Iraq War on the stability of the region than of an external threat posed by the Soviet Union.

In testimony before the Senate Armed Services Committee (SASC) in March 1989, Schwarzkopf maintained that the Soviet Union was a threat to the region, but when giving an overview of the countries in the region, he noted that Iraq posed a threat to its weaker neighbors. He implored for the US to "seek to assert a moderating influence in Iraq". With regional turmoil growing, Schwarzkopf became concerned about the threat posed by Saddam Hussein, focusing the attention of his command on preparing to respond to what he thought was a "more realistic scenario". That year, his command began planning to counter an Iraqi invasion of Kuwait, seeing it as a likely conflict that would threaten the interests of the United States.

In early 1990, he testified again before the SASC in threat-assessment hearings that the Cold War was ending and that it was less likely the Soviet Union would exert military force in the region. Though he declined to identify Iraq specifically as a threat, he noted a regional conflict was the most likely event to destabilize the region and that noted Iraq's ceasefire with Iran meant it was continuing to grow and modernize its military. In early 1990, he drafted a war plan, Operations Plan 1002-90, titled "Defense of the Arabian Peninsula", which envisioned an Iraqi invasion of Saudi Arabia through Kuwait.

During CENTCOM military exercises in July 1990, termed Internal Look '90, Schwarzkopf wrote a scenario that tested how the command would respond to a regional dictator invading a neighboring country and threatening oilfields there, which closely mirrored the rising tension between Iraq and Kuwait. One week after the end of the exercises, Iraq invaded Kuwait on 2 August 1990.

=== Gulf War ===
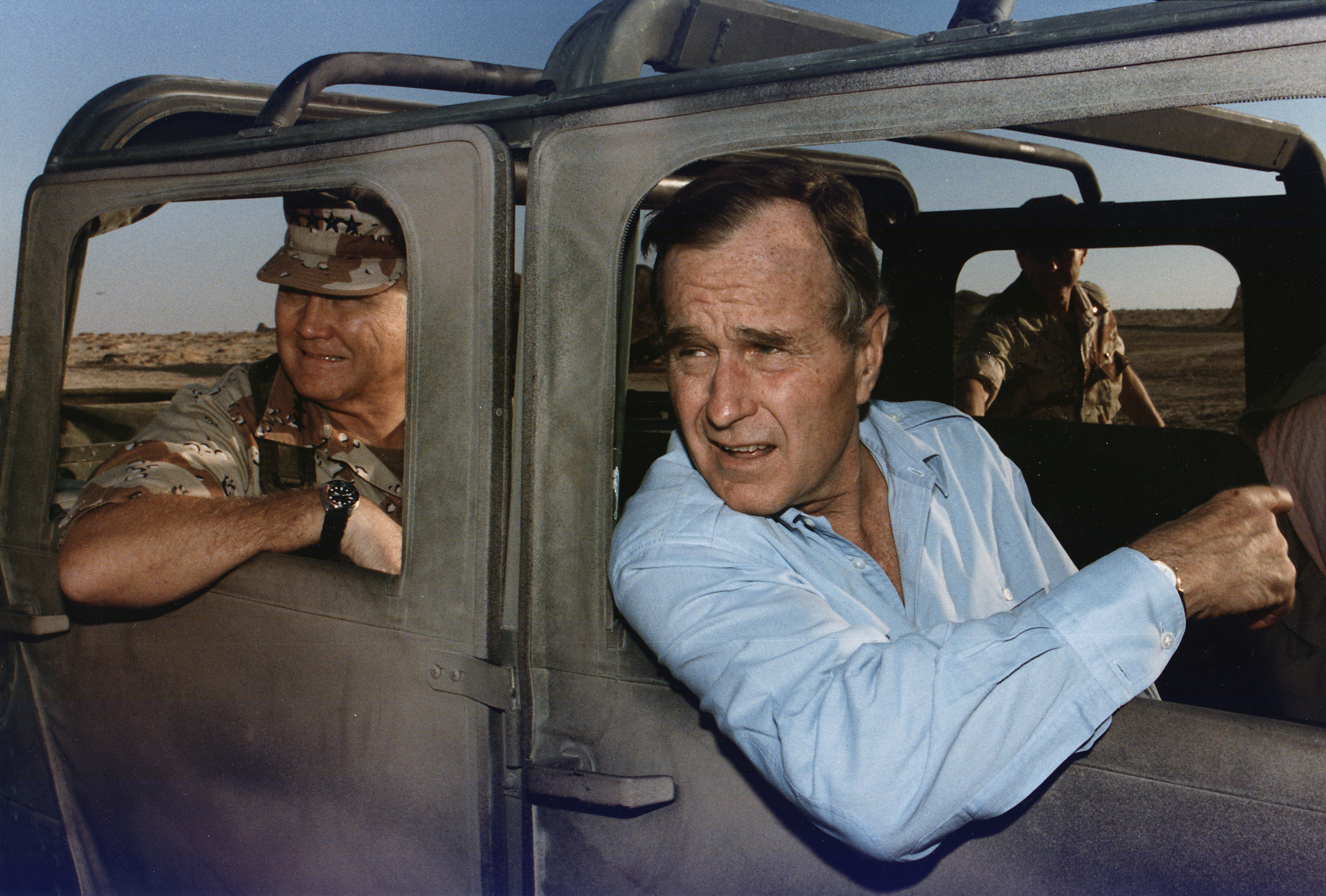
U.S. president George H. W. Bush riding in a Humvee with General Schwarzkopf in Saudi Arabia

Initially believing that the Iraqi Army would advance only to the Rumailah oil field, Schwarzkopf was surprised when the Iraqis captured Kuwait City. Fearing Iraq would next invade Saudi Arabia, Schwarzkopf ordered contingency plans put in motion, with the 82nd Airborne Division, 101st Airborne Division and 24th Infantry Division put on alert. He was then called to an emergency meeting with US President George H. W. Bush, where his Internal Look '90 command post wargame was made the basis of a potential counteroffensive plan. By 5 August, Bush opted for an aggressive response to the invasion. Schwarzkopf then accompanied Secretary of Defense Dick Cheney to meet with Saudi King Fahd to convince him to allow U.S. troops into Saudi Arabia to counter the Iraqi military.

With Fahd's consent, Bush ordered troops into Saudi Arabia on 7 August, initially tasked to defend Saudi Arabia should Iraq attack. U.S. commanders from the beginning wanted a quick conflict characterized by decisive, overwhelming force, as opposed to the gradual escalation of U.S. involvement as had been seen in Vietnam. Schwarzkopf in particular was adamant to avoid repeating many of the policies governing military operations in Vietnam, especially the slow escalation of air power and troop forces. His plan for direct and overwhelming force was initially criticized in Washington as uncreative. By 13 August, the news media began to closely cover Schwarzkopf, who had been named to lead the operation.

==== Operation Desert Shield ====
From his headquarters in Tampa, Schwarzkopf began planning the operations to defend Saudi Arabia. Lieutenant General Charles Horner, USAF, ran the headquarters in Riyadh. Schwarzkopf planned supply lines for the 50,000 troops initially sent to Saudi Arabia, tapping Major General William G. Pagonis as director of the logistical operations, with US Air Force cargo aircraft landing supplies at Dhahran and US Navy ships offloading troops and supplies at Dammam. By 20 August, 20,000 U.S. troops were in Saudi Arabia, with another 80,000 preparing to deploy, and a further 40,000 reserves tapped to augment them. Schwarzkopf arrived at the CENTCOM command in Riyadh on 25 August, and on 29 August, he conducted his first front-line tour of the potential combat zone, accompanied by reporters.

Over the next several weeks, Schwarzkopf spoke frequently with both reporters and troops under his command, conducting many high-profile press conferences and updates to the situation in Saudi Arabia. Schwarzkopf worked to help coordinate the contributions of the different nations contributing military forces to the effort. By mid-October, Schwarzkopf indicated he was confident the forces were of a sufficient level that they could defend Saudi Arabia if it was attacked. Through October, Schwarzkopf and his command were occupied with setting up facilities and supply lines for the troops streaming into Saudi Arabia. He also worked to minimize the culture clash among foreigners in sharia-dominated Saudi Arabia such as the high visibility of women in military roles. Schwarzkopf remained at his command in Riyadh until December and made frequent frontline visits to the troops. On 29 December 1990, he received a warning order from the Pentagon to be ready to attack into Iraq and Kuwait by 17 January.

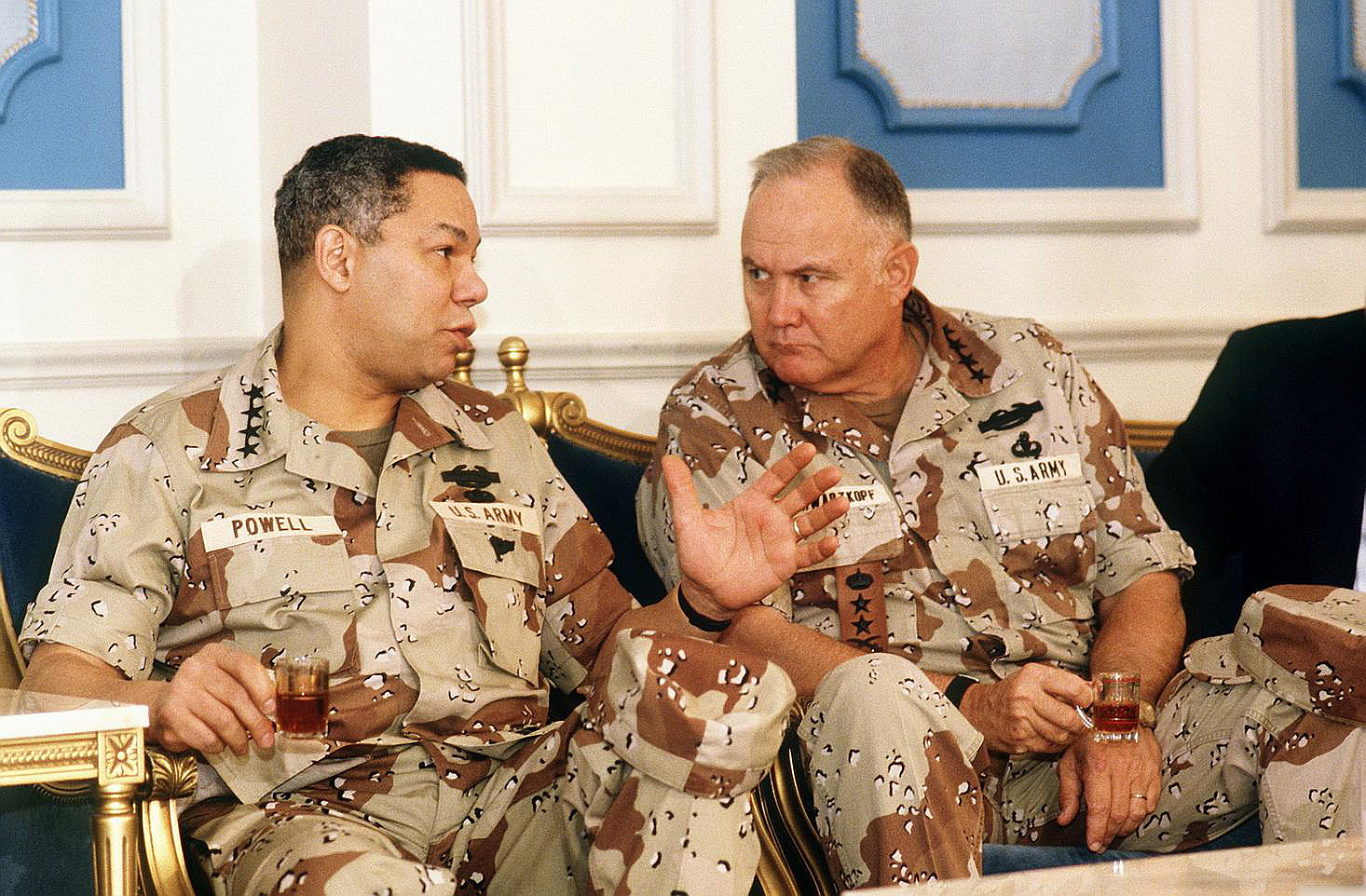
Schwarzkopf talks with General Colin Powell, Chairman of the Joint Chiefs of Staff, during a press conference regarding the Gulf War

Initially, Operation Desert Shield involved a sea interdiction campaign that saw international warships detaining and inspecting tankers from Iraq. As the buildup continued, Schwarzkopf was occupied with planning an offensive operation against the Iraqi units along the border, sometimes working 18-hour days in planning, closely assisted by a group of aides. He frequently met with subordinates and Saudi commanders. Schwarzkopf planned counters for Iraq's large armored forces, air forces, and elite Republican Guard forces. While planning, Schwarzkopf remained in frequent contact with Chairman of the Joint Chiefs of Staff, General Colin Powell concerning Schwarzkopf's plans for the offensive.

Schwarzkopf devised an operational plan, dubbed "Operation Desert Storm", to be based on overwhelming force and strong infantry attacks supported by artillery and armor. By 8 November, Bush agreed to commit 400,000 US troops to Saudi Arabia at Schwarzkopf's insistence. Schwarzkopf believed that more troops would reduce the likelihood of high casualties. He planned a strategic bombing campaign to precede an offensive into Kuwait, simultaneously striking the forward Iraqi forces and their supply lines. In the meantime, diplomatic solutions began to break down, and the deadline established by the United Nations Security Council, 15 January 1991, passed without a solution.

By then, Schwarzkopf commanded an international army of 750,000, comprising 500,000 US troops and 250,000 troops from other nations, as well as thousands of main battle tanks, combat aircraft and six carrier battle groups. Most of the US and allied forces, however, were not combat veterans, and Schwarzkopf and the other allied commanders wanted to fight cautiously to minimize casualties. Schwarzkopf's experience in the Middle East allowed him to understand the factors surrounding the conflict, including the allied commanders, with greater ease. He had a good relationship with Saudi commander Khalid bin Sultan, who, in turn, helped Schwarzkopf win over the Saudi Arabian populace. In spite of the co-operation, he later said that he considered the Arab troops to be the least effective of the war.

Schwarzkopf also had an agreeable relationship with his deputy commander, Lieutenant General Calvin Waller, who handled much of the administrative burden. Peter de la Billière, commander of the British contingent, and Michel Roquejeoffre, commander of the French contingent, also co-operated well with Schwarzkopf. The good relationship between the allied commanders allowed their forces to co-operate effectively during the operation.

==== Operation Desert Storm ====
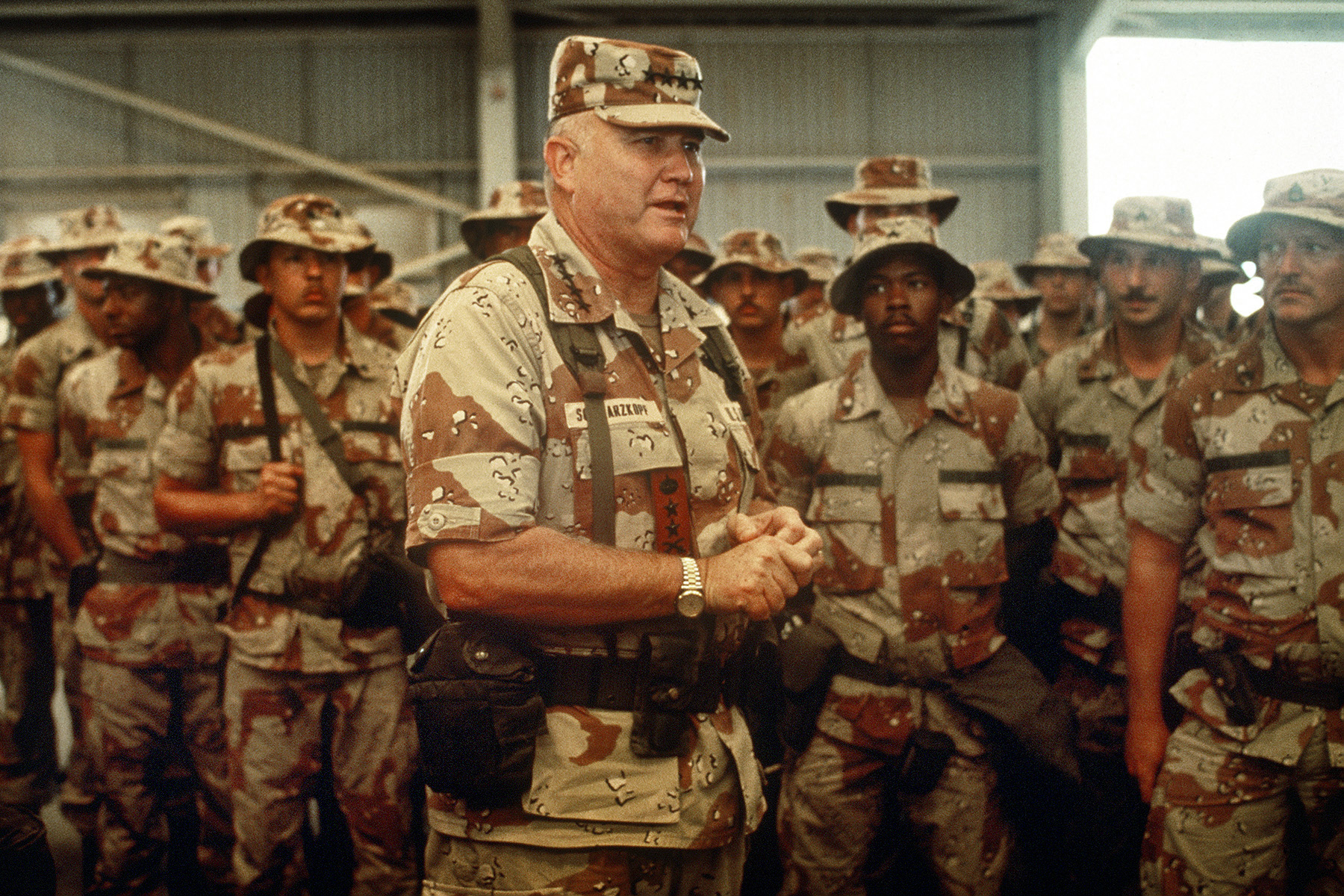
Schwarzkopf speaks with troops supporting Operation Desert Shield in 1991

The air campaign against Iraq began on 17 January 1991, after 139 days of planning and buildup. Schwarzkopf sent a prepared statement to the troops ahead of the first airstrikes, which were timed to hit their targets at 02:40. He oversaw the strikes from his war room in Riyadh, emerged from his command center late in the day on 18 January to speak to the press, and said the air war had gone "just about exactly as we had intended it to go". He then began making frequent briefings to the media. He declined to measure the success of the campaign by counting suspected Iraqi casualties, believing that would undermine his credibility.

Ground troop movements 24–28 February 1991, during Operation Desert Storm

The air campaign proved to be a success by achieving air superiority and destroying the Iraqi military's communications network, supplies, and many tanks and armored vehicles. By 20 January he announced Iraq's nuclear test reactors had been destroyed, and by 27 January he announced that the coalition had total air superiority in Iraq. Over 38 days, the Air Force destroyed 39 percent of the T-72 tanks, 32 percent of the Armored Personnel Carriers, and 47 percent of the artillery. In the aggregate, the Air Force met the goal of 50 percent attrition of the Iraqi ground force. Bush then gave Hussein an ultimatum to withdraw from Kuwait by 12:00 on 23 February or Schwarzkopf's ground forces would attack.

Schwarzkopf began his ground campaign in earnest at 04:00 on 24 February, with the Saudi-led Arab forces attacking into Kuwait City, while two US Marine Corps divisions struck at the oil fields, and the VII Corps and XVIII Airborne Corps on the left flank struck quickly to cut off the Iraqi forces from the west, which would later be known as his "Left Hook" strategy. Schwarzkopf expected the war to last several weeks and had anticipated chemical weapon attacks by the Iraqi forces, which did not occur. Resistance was lighter than Schwarzkopf expected, and Iraqi troops surrendered in large numbers.

Within 90 hours, his force had destroyed 42 of 50 Iraqi Army divisions at a cost of about 125 killed and 200 wounded among American troops, and about 482 killed, 458 wounded among all of the coalition. He ordered his forces to destroy as much Iraqi armor and equipment as possible to ensure the weakening of Iraq's offensive capability in the near term. White House chief of staff John Sununu suggested that should the cease-fire take effect at 5 a.m. on 28 February, it would be possible to name the conflict "The Hundred Hour War". Powell agreed and talked with Schwarzkopf, who pointed out that it would also make it a "Five Day War".

Schwarzkopf, who had ordered a media blackout during the ground offensive, finally appeared before journalists on 27 February to explain his strategy. On 3 March, he arrived in Kuwait City to survey the aftermath of the Iraqi occupation and negotiate a ceasefire with Iraqi military leaders and to work out the return of prisoners of war on both sides. With this in place, he then began the process of overseeing U.S. troops returning from the conflict.

For his services during the war, Schwarzkopf was welcomed back to America with a parade down Broadway in New York, along with other honors. He became the only person to receive the Distinguished Service Medal from the Army, Navy, Air Force and Coast Guard. Schwarzkopf also led a highly publicized homecoming parade in Washington, D.C., on 8 June 1991, where he was greeted by Bush amid thousands of onlookers. His reception differed markedly from that of commanders who returned from the Vietnam and Korean Wars. He became an instant national celebrity and the source of great curiosity by the general public. He was quick to award praise and medals to the troops, part of what he saw as restoring pride in the US armed forces after the Vietnam War.

== Later life ==
=== Retirement ===
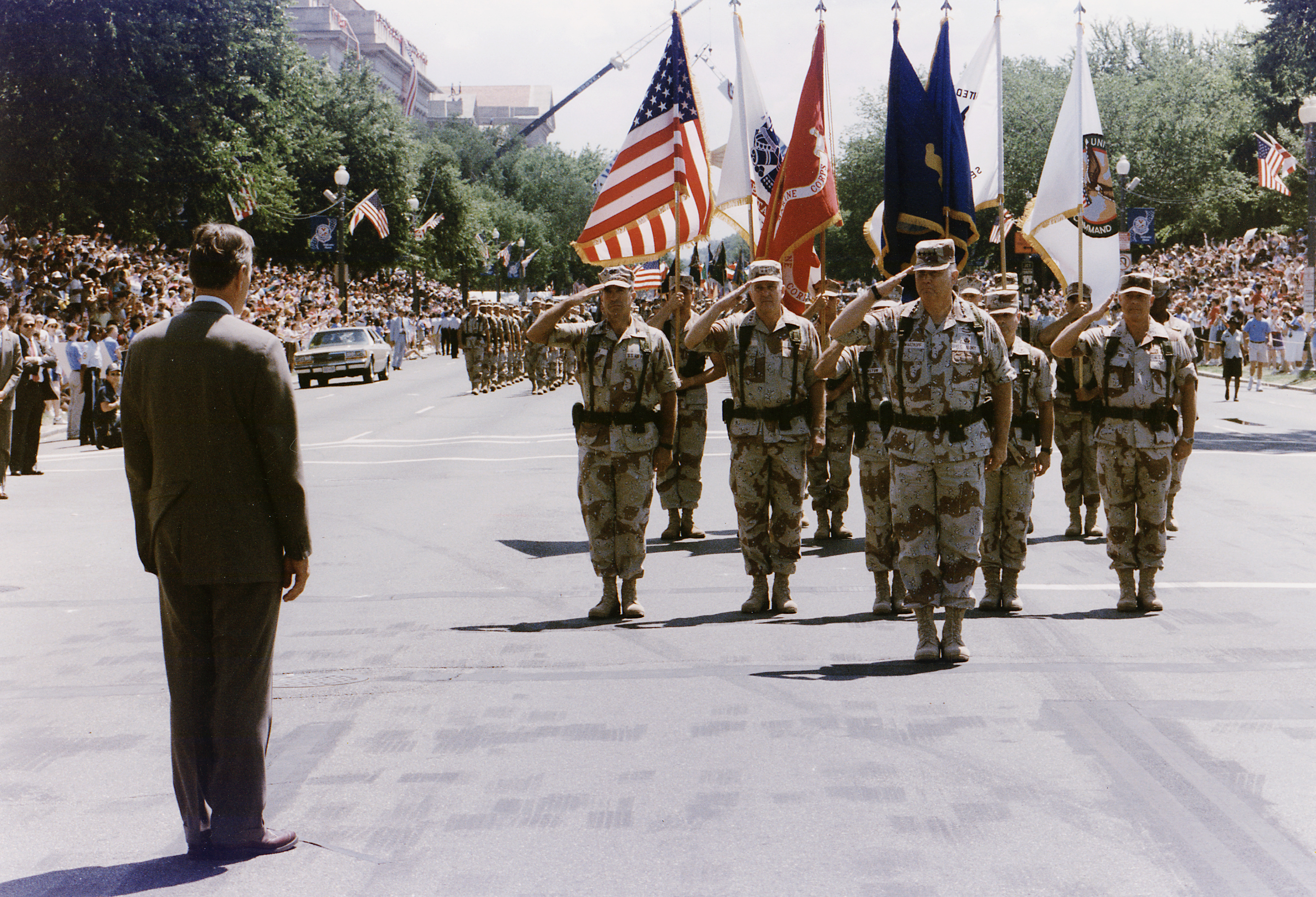
Schwarzkopf is met by President George H. W. Bush during a homecoming parade for troops returning from the Gulf War in 1991

Schwarzkopf returned to the United States after the Gulf War as a national hero, and his ability to effectively deal with the press left him a positive image. Schwarzkopf indicated a desire to retire from the military in mid-1991. He was initially considered for promotion alternatively to General of the Army or to Army Chief of Staff, and was ultimately asked to assume the latter post, but he declined. He was later questioned about running for political office, but, considering himself an independent, expressed little interest in doing so; ultimately denying speculation of possibly seeking the Senate seat in Florida. Schwarzkopf was not vocal about his political opinions during his military career. He retired from the military in August 1991, moving to Tampa, Florida.

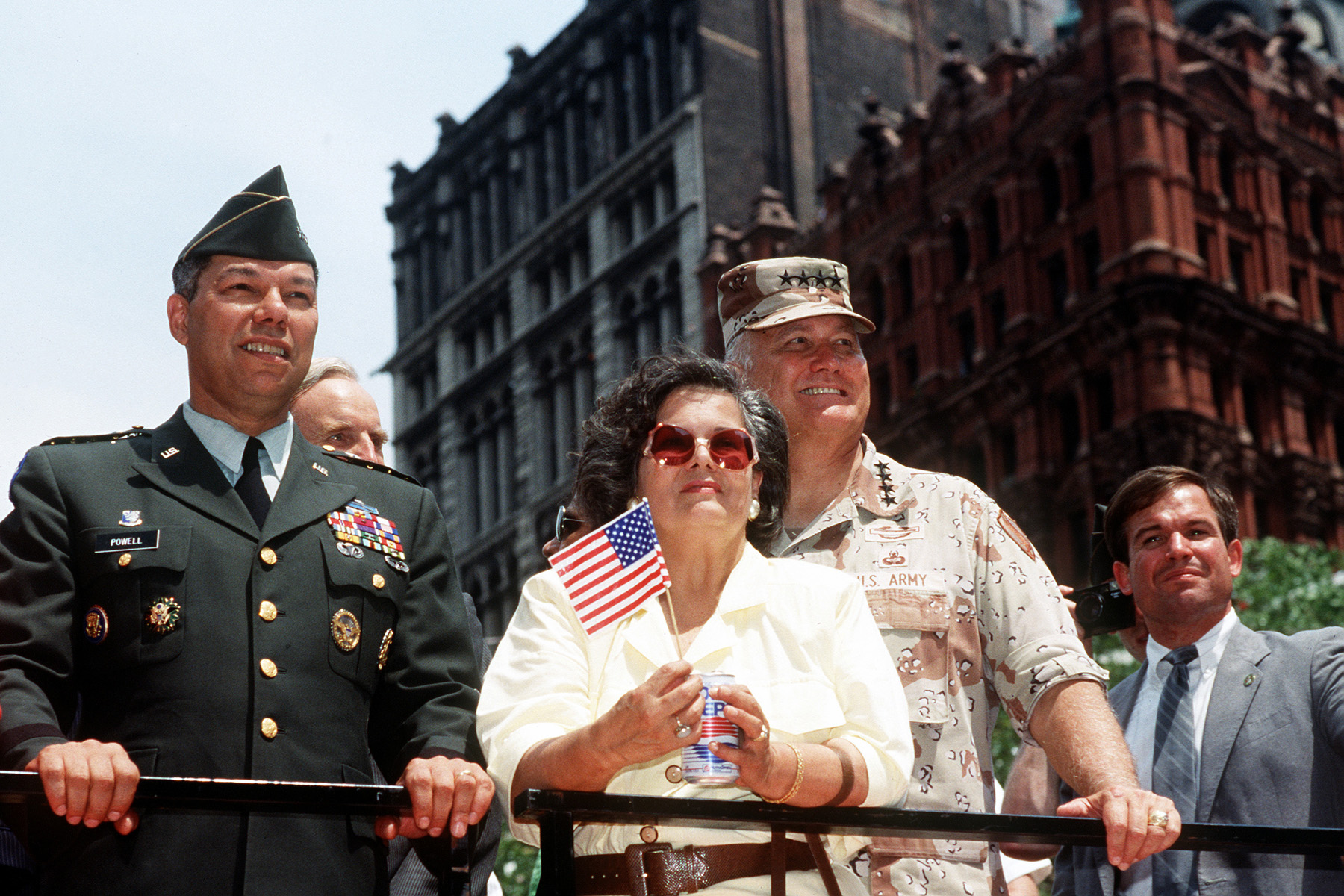
Gen. Colin Powell, Gen. Norman Schwarzkopf, and Mrs. Schwarzkopf ride in the Welcome Home parade in New York City honoring the men and women who served in Desert Storm

Following his retirement, Schwarzkopf attained a status as celebrity, and was highly praised in the news media. He was profiled by the Associated Press, the Washington Post, Newsday, and People, as well as praised in a Random House publication on the war, Triumph in the Desert. Schwarzkopf's speaking fees topped $60,000 per public appearance.

External videos
- Booknotes interview with Schwarzkopf on It Doesn't Take a Hero, 22 November 1992, C-SPAN

In 1992, Schwarzkopf published a memoir, It Doesn't Take a Hero, about his life; it became a bestseller. Schwarzkopf sold the rights to his memoirs to Bantam Books for $5,000,000. In 1993, Schwarzkopf was found to have prostate cancer, for which he was successfully treated. Among the many honors he received was the Presidential Medal of Freedom in 2002. Queen Elizabeth II honorarily knighted Schwarzkopf and he was awarded many other military accolades from foreign countries. He led the Pegasus Parade at the Kentucky Derby and was an honorary guest at the Indianapolis 500. He supported several children's charities and national philanthropic causes, and he was a spokesperson for prostate cancer awareness, recovery of the grizzly bear from endangered species status, and served on the Nature Conservancy board of governors. Schwarzkopf otherwise sought to live out a low-profile retirement in Tampa, though he briefly served as a military commentator for NBC.

On 7 November 1994, Schwarzkopf won $14,000 for the Boggy Creek Gang on Celebrity Jeopardy!

In 2002, he was involved with an educational video game about asthma, Quest for the Code, which he launched with Steven Spielberg through the Starbright Foundation. He also voiced a character in the game.

At first, Schwarzkopf was ambivalent during the run-up to the Iraq War in 2003. He initially endorsed an invasion after Colin Powell's presentation to the United Nations on 6 February 2003. When weapons of mass destruction were not located in the country after the invasion, he changed his stance. He was critical of the lack of a reconstruction plan after the fall of Baghdad, feeling the initial offensive operations plans did not take into account the cultural complexities of Iraq. In 2004, he was critical of Donald Rumsfeld and his handling of Operation Iraqi Freedom. He felt it was a mistake to send U.S. Army Reserve troops into the country without adequate training.

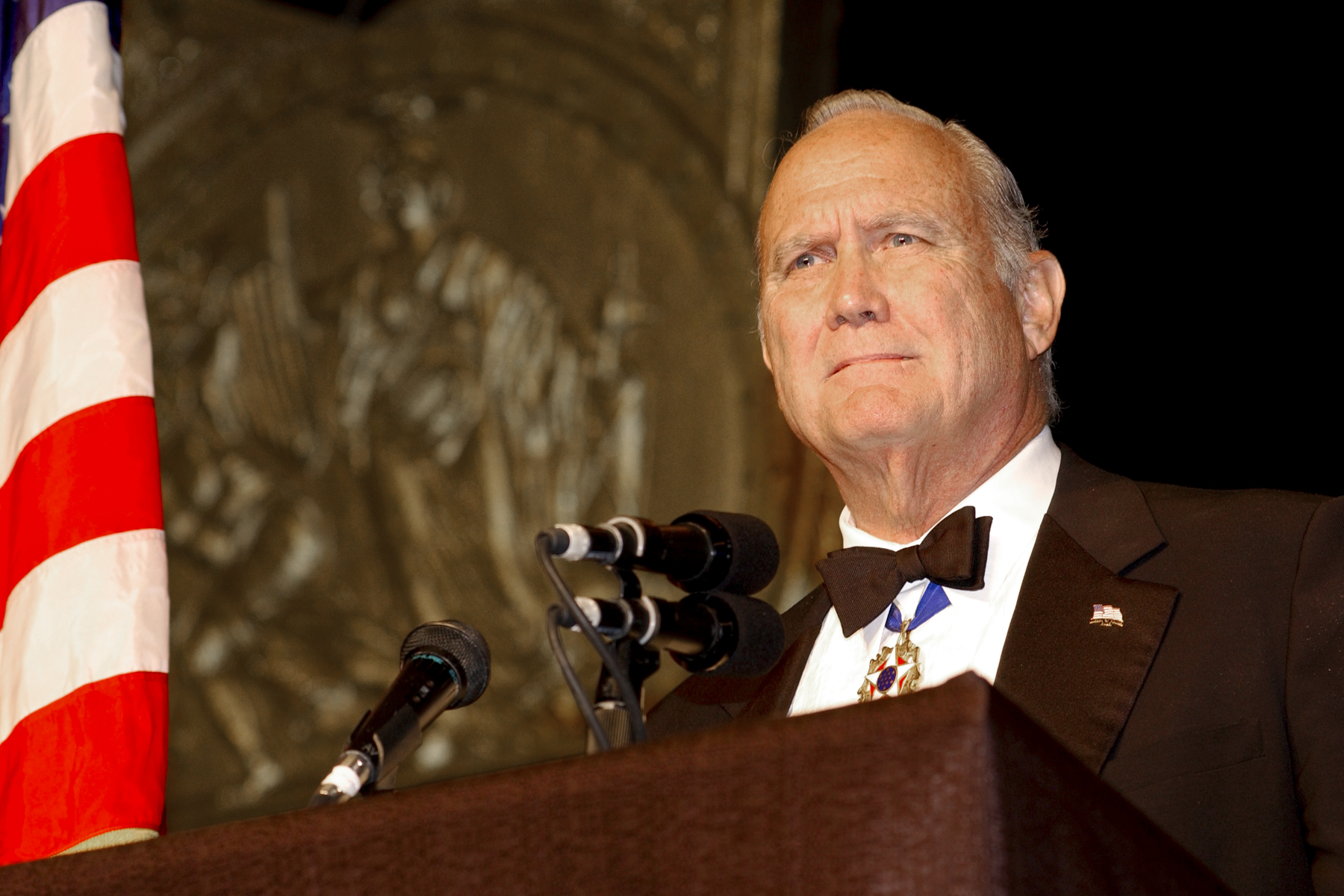
Schwarzkopf speaks after receiving the Congressional Medal of Honor Society's Patriot Award in 2002

Schwarzkopf endorsed George W. Bush in the 2000 U.S. presidential election and the 2004 U.S. presidential election. He supported John McCain in the 2008 U.S. presidential election. He was on several occasions encouraged to run for United States Senate or President of the United States as a member of the Republican Party, but showed no interest.

=== Death ===
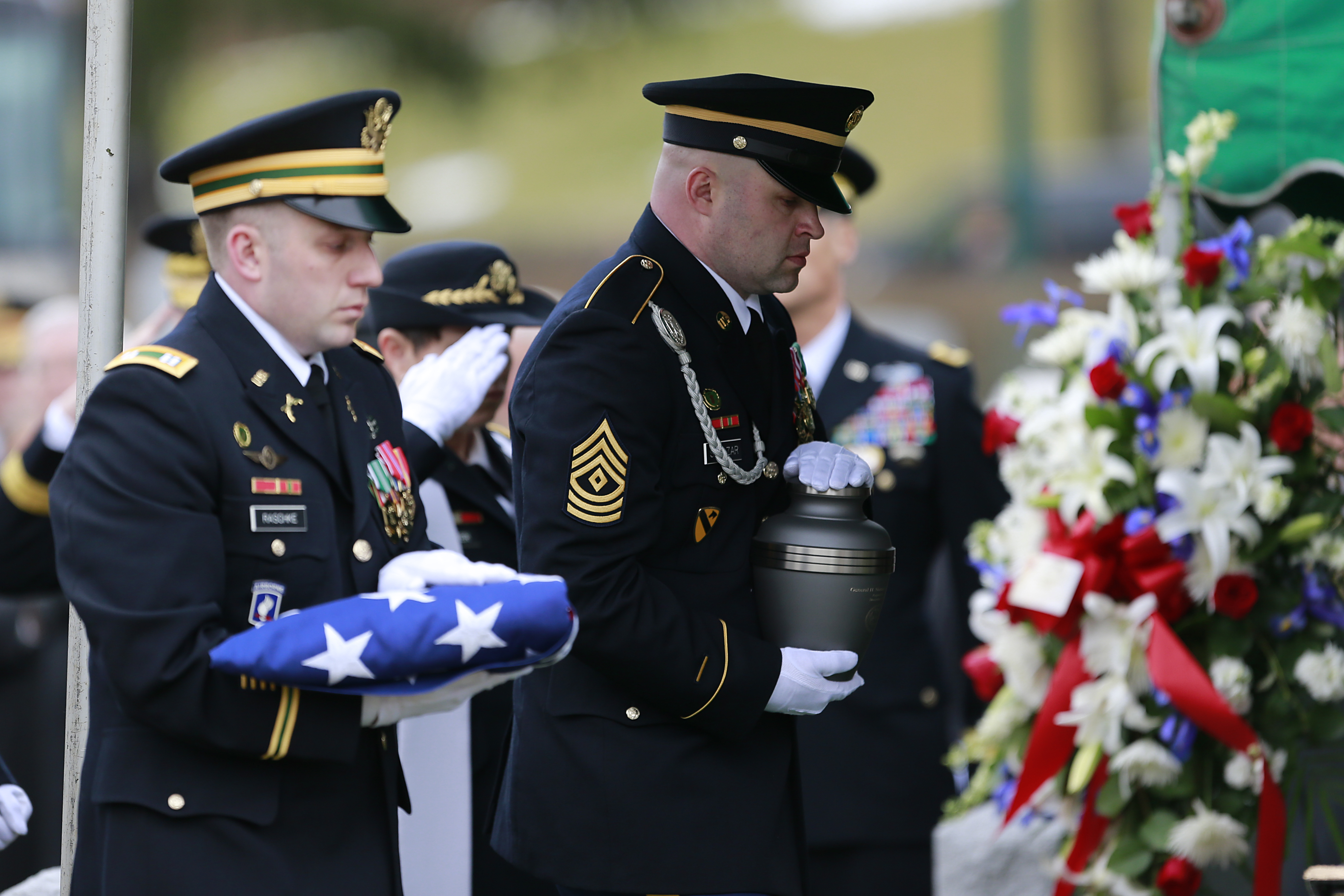
A soldier presents Schwarzkopf's cremated remains at his memorial service on 28 February 2013

Schwarzkopf died at age of 78 on 27 December 2012, of complications following a bout with pneumonia. A memorial service was conducted on 28 February 2013, at the Cadet Chapel at West Point, which was attended by Colin Powell, Schwarzkopf's family, and others. Schwarzkopf was cremated and his ashes were buried near those of his father in the West Point Cemetery in a ceremony attended by cadets, military leaders, New York and New Jersey State Police Troopers.

Among reactions to Schwarzkopf's death, George H. W. Bush said of him: "General Norm Schwarzkopf, to me, epitomized the 'duty, service, country' creed that has defended our freedom and seen this great Nation through our most trying international crises. More than that, he was a good and decent man and a dear friend". In a statement, president Barack Obama said "From his decorated service in Vietnam to the historic liberation of Kuwait and his leadership of United States Central Command, General Schwarzkopf stood tall for the country and Army he loved". In a letter, Secretary of the Army John McHugh and Army Chief of Staff General Raymond T. Odierno wrote in a joint statement, "Our nation owes a great debt of gratitude to General Schwarzkopf and our Soldiers will hold a special place in their hearts for this great leader. While much will be written in coming days of his many accomplishments, his most lasting and important legacies are the tremendous soldiers he trained and led".

== Legacy ==
=== Leadership style ===
During his tour of duty in Vietnam, Schwarzkopf developed a reputation as a commander who preferred to lead from the front, even willing to risk his own life for his subordinates. His leadership style stressed preparedness, discipline and rigorous training, but also allowed his troops to enjoy the luxuries they had. In a valedictory address to West Point cadets he stressed the need for competence and character. His rehabilitation of the 1st Battalion, 6th Infantry stressed survival as well as offense. Like German Field Marshal Erwin Rommel and General George S. Patton, Schwarzkopf highly regarded decisiveness and valued determination among his commanders. He pushed for offensive combat over defensive operations in the Gulf War.

He was known to be extremely critical of staff officers who were unprepared, but was even more contentious with other generals who he felt were not aggressive enough. His frequent short temper with subordinates was well known in his command. His leadership style was sometimes criticized by subordinates who felt it reduced their ability to solve problems creatively. Army Chief of Staff Carl E. Vuono, a lifelong friend of Schwarzkopf, described him as "competent, compassionate, egotistical, loyal, opinionated, funny, emotional, sensitive to any slight. At times he can be an overbearing bastard, but not with me". While Colin Powell would say Schwarzkopf's strengths outweighed his weaknesses, Dick Cheney personally disliked what he considered Schwarzkopf's pretentious behavior with subordinates. Cheney doubted Schwarzkopf's ability to lead the Gulf War, and so Powell dealt with Schwarzkopf instead.

=== Critiques of Gulf War leadership ===
The quick and decisive results of the Gulf War were attributed to Schwarzkopf's leadership. President Bush declared, "Lesson number one from the Gulf War is the value of air power". Secretary of Defense Cheney said, "The air campaign was decisive".

Historian Rick Atkinson considered Schwarzkopf "the most theatrical American in uniform since Douglas MacArthur". Atkinson further contended that in his leadership during the Gulf War, Schwarzkopf conducted one of the greatest military campaigns of all time, providing the United States with its "first battlefield hero in decades". The later accomplishments of General Tommy Franks during Operation Enduring Freedom were compared favorably with those of Schwarzkopf. However, in an analysis of the effects of the Gulf War, several historians, including Spencer C. Tucker, contended that Schwarzkopf's ceasefire agreement allowed Iraq to continue to fly armed helicopters, which allowed it to later conduct operations against its Shia Arab and Kurdish populations. Schwarzkopf later wrote it would have been a mistake to continue the offensive and capture all of Iraq, noting that the U.S. would likely have had to pay the entire cost of rebuilding the country.

Michael R. Gordon and Bernard E. Trainor wrote in their 1995 book The Generals' War: "Behind-the-scenes sniping continued, for the confrontation between the Army field commanders and the Air Force was not so much about the performance of airpower as the Army's inability to control it. As the Air Force saw it, the Gulf War was a model for future conflicts. But neither the Army nor the Marines wanted to go to war that way again".

In a 2012 book, historian Thomas E. Ricks wrote Schwarzkopf's lack of experience with politics was disadvantageous to his conduct of the war. Ricks said that Schwarzkopf was overly cautious in the execution of his plans because of his fear of repeating mistakes in Vietnam, which meant his troops failed to destroy the Iraqi Republican Guard. Ricks further criticized Schwarzkopf for failing to relieve General Frederick M. Franks Jr. as well as other subordinates who Schwarzkopf said, in his memoirs, were ineffective. Ricks concluded that the Gulf War was a "tactical triumph but a strategic draw at best". In his memoirs, Schwarzkopf responded to these kinds of criticisms by saying his mandate had only been to liberate and safeguard Kuwait and that an invasion of Iraq would have been highly controversial, particularly among Middle Eastern military allies.

Schwarzkopf sought to change the relationship between journalists and the military, feeling that the news media's negative portrayal of the Vietnam War had degraded troops there. When he took command during the Gulf War, he sought an entirely different strategy, which was ultimately successful by favoring greater media coverage but subject to strict controls on the battlefield. Schwarzkopf favored the intense press surrounding the Gulf War conflict, feeling that blocking the news media, as had been done in Grenada, would affect public perception of the war in the United States negatively. His dealings with the press were thus frequent and very personal, and he conducted regular briefings for journalists. He would usually not attack media coverage, even if negative, unless he felt it was blatantly incorrect. He staged visible media appearances that played to patriotism.

In fact, Schwarzkopf believed extensive press coverage would help build public support for the war and raise morale. In some press conferences, he showed and explained advanced war-fighting technology that the U.S. possessed to impress the public. These also had the side effect of distracting the public from focusing on U.S. casualty counts or the destruction wrought in the war. Schwarzkopf's strategy was to control the message being sent and so he ordered media on the battlefield to be escorted at all times. However, several high-profile reports publicized the CENTCOM strategy. After the war, Schwarzkopf was very critical of military analysts who scrutinized his operation, felt that some of them were poorly informed on the factors involved in his planning, and felt that others were violating operations security by revealing too much about how he might plan the operation.

== Awards and decorations ==
Schwarzkopf was awarded the following military decorations:

U.S. military decorations
Defense Distinguished Service Medal
Army Distinguished Service Medal (with 2 bronze Oak Leaf Clusters)
Navy Distinguished Service Medal
Air Force Distinguished Service Medal
Coast Guard Distinguished Service Medal
Silver Star (with 2 Oak Leaf Clusters)
Defense Superior Service Medal
Legion of Merit
Distinguished Flying Cross
Bronze Star Medal (with Valor Device and 2 Oak Leaf Clusters)
Purple Heart (with Oak Leaf Cluster)
Meritorious Service Medal (with 2 Oak Leaf Clusters)
Air Medal (with bronze award numeral 9)
Army Commendation Medal (with Valor Device and 3 Oak Leaf Clusters)
Unit Awards
Joint Meritorious Unit Award
Meritorious Unit Commendation
Republic of Vietnam Gallantry Cross Unit Citation
Republic of Vietnam Civil Actions Unit Citation
U.S. Service (Campaign) Medals and Service and Training Ribbons
Army of Occupation Medal
National Defense Service Medal (with one bronze service star)
Armed Forces Expeditionary Medal
Vietnam Service Medal (with four bronze campaign stars)
Army Service Ribbon
Army Overseas Service Ribbon (with award numeral 3)

U.S. badges, patches and tabs
Combat Infantryman Badge
Master Parachutist Badge
Army Staff Identification Badge
Office of the Joint Chiefs of Staff Identification Badge
Office of the Secretary of Defense Identification Badge
United States Central Command Badge
6th Infantry Regiment Distinctive Unit Insignia

U.S. non-military and foreign military personal awards and decorations
United States Presidential Medal of Freedom
French Légion d'honneur, Grand Officer
Order of King Abdulaziz, Commander
British Knight Commander in the Military Division of Most Honourable Order of the Bath (honorary)
Vietnamese Gallantry Cross (with two Palms and gold Star)
Republic of Vietnam Armed Forces Honor Medal, First Class
Vietnam Campaign Medal
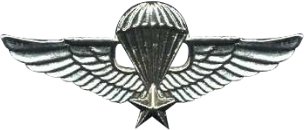
Republic of Vietnam Master Parachutist Badge

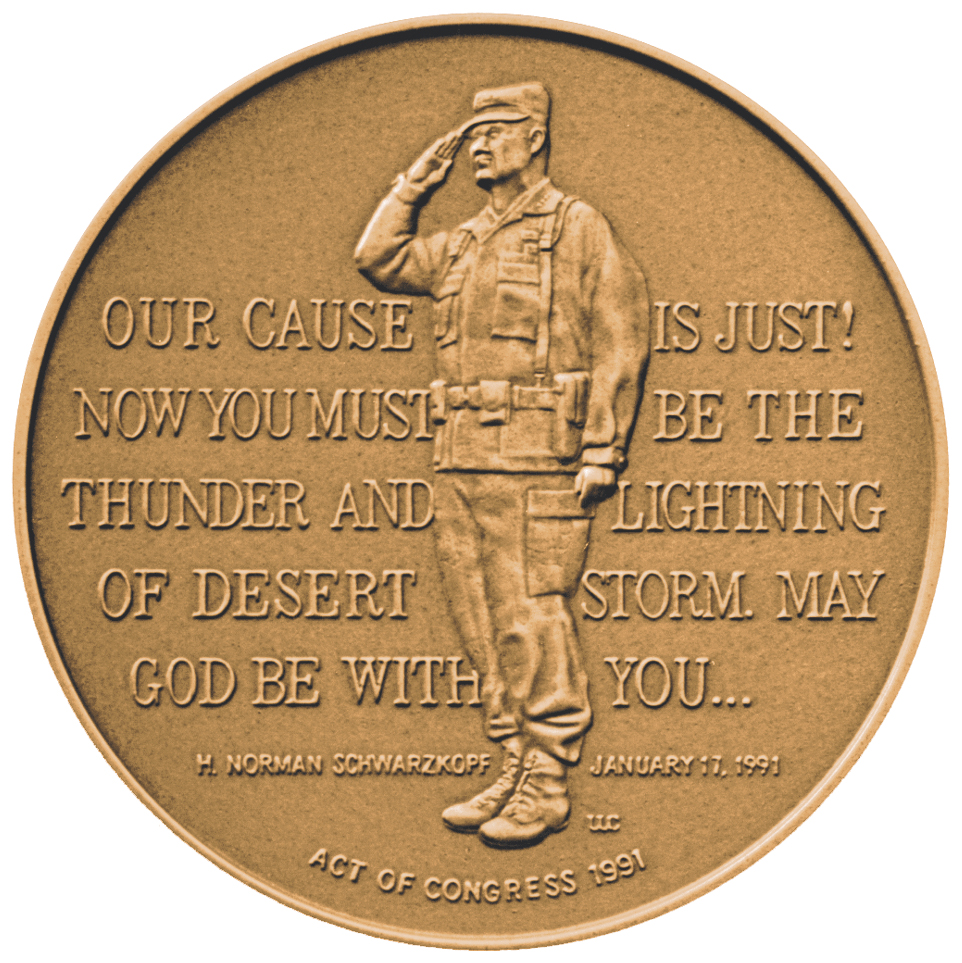
The reverse of the Congressional Gold Medal presented to General H. Norman Schwarzkopf

=== Other honors ===
- Congressional Gold Medal, 1991
- United States Republican Senatorial Medal of Freedom
- Schwarzkopf Elementary School, named after him in Lutz, Florida, 1991
- Honorary First-Class Private in the French Foreign Legion, 1991
- Golden Plate Award of the American Academy of Achievement, 1991
- Distinguished German-American of the Year, 2006
- Inducted in the New Jersey Hall of Fame, 2008
- Time cover on 4 February 1991 and 1 April 1996
- Trail at Telluride Ski Resort renamed "Stormin' Norman", 2012
- On 19 October 1993, the Native American Osage Nation in Pawhuska, Oklahoma made General Schwarzkopf an honorary Osage Chief. Upon his request from the Peace Clan of the Osage, he was made specifically a chief of peace and not war, receiving the name Tzi-Zho Ki-He-Kah ("Chief of all the Eagles"). Osage chiefs called out this name four times, then a huge herd of wild bison were ceremonially released onto the Tallgrass Prairie Preserve.

Military offices
Preceded by George B. Crist	Commander-in-Chief of United States Central Command; 1988–1991	Succeeded by Joseph P. Hoar
