= HM Prison =

Name given to prisons in the UK and parts of the commonwealth

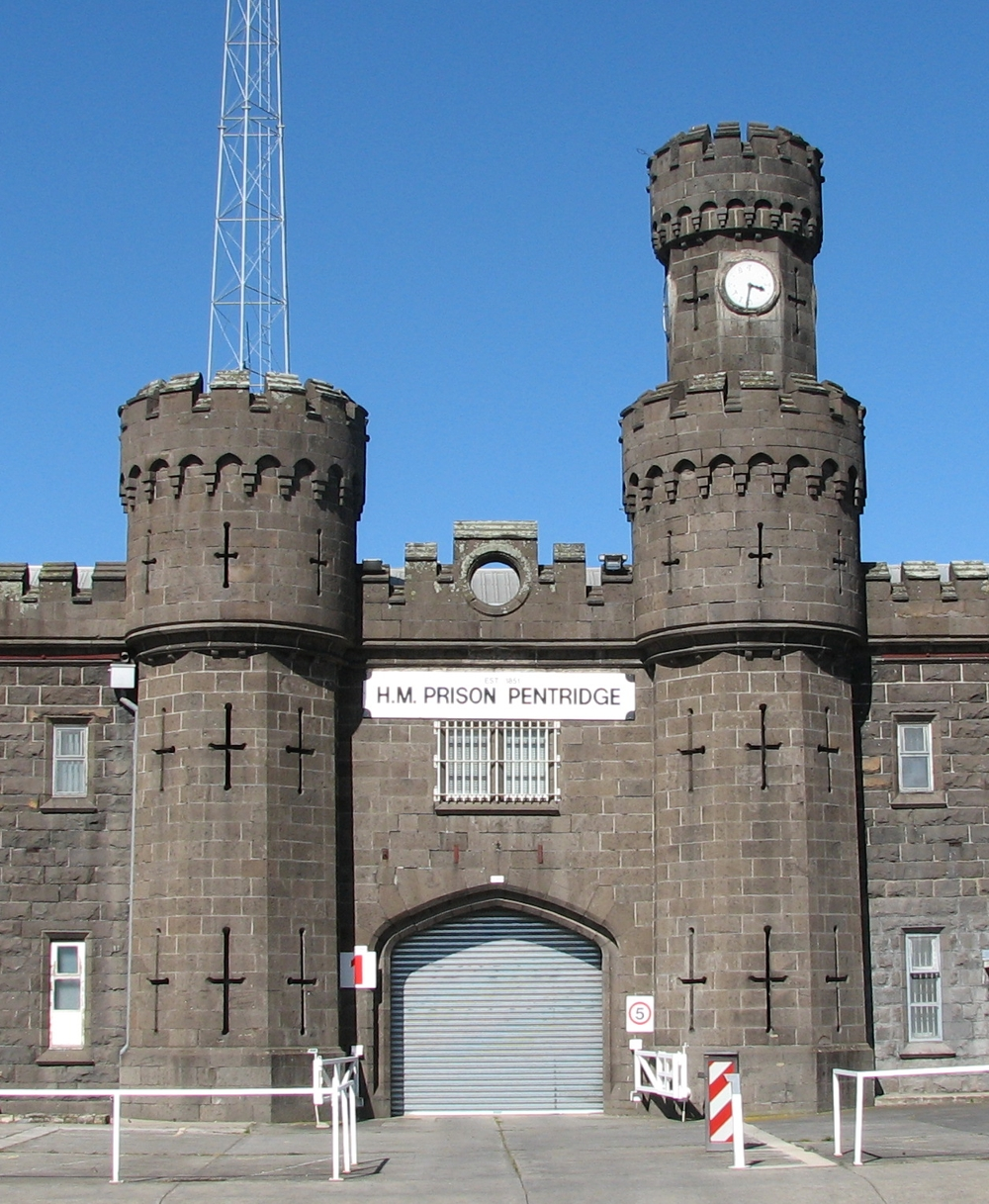
HM Prison Pentridge, Australia

His Majesty's Prisons (Her Majesty's Prisons in the case of a female monarch) is the name given to prisons in the United Kingdom, as well as some in Australia and a small number in Newfoundland and Labrador, Grenada, Jersey, The Bahamas and Barbados. The title makes up part of the name of individual prisons and is usually abbreviated to HM Prison or HMP.

== Australia ==
The title of HM Prison is given to a number of prisons in Australia, especially in the state of Victoria.

== Bahamas ==
Fox Hill Prison in Nassau was formerly known as Her Majesty's Prisons.

== Barbados ==
The title of HM Prison was given to HMP Dodds Prison in St. Philip, until the crown was dissolved, it was also the name given to the former Glendairy Prison in Station Hill, St. Michael.

== Belize ==
The Belize Museum was formerly a HM prison.

== Newfoundland and Labrador ==
Her Majesty's Penitentiary (as of September 2023 the name has not changed to reflect the accession of King Charles III) at 89 Forest Road in St. John's, Newfoundland and Labrador was built in 1859, and is still operational as a men's correctional facility of the Department of Justice and Public Safety of Newfoundland and Labrador.

In November 2021, the government of Newfoundland and Labrador issued a request for proposals to design, build and finance a new prison to replace the aging HMP facility.

== Gibraltar ==
- HM Prison Moorish Castle (defunct)
- HM Prison Windmill Hill

== Grenada ==
The title of His Majesty's Prison (Grenada) is given to the Richmond Hill Prison in Saint George's, Grenada. The prison is run by the Ministry of National Security. The prison governor is Dr John Mitchell, the Commissioner of Prisons in Grenada.

The prison accommodates both sexes, but has separate sections for male and female prisoners. As of 2019 it held 463 prisoners, more than double its official capacity of 198.

== See also ==
- Hong Kong Correctional Services - British Colonial prison system from 1879 to 1997
- ‘At His Majesty's pleasure’: a prison sentence of indefinite length
