= Regional Security System =

International agreement for the defence and security of the eastern Caribbean region

- Logo

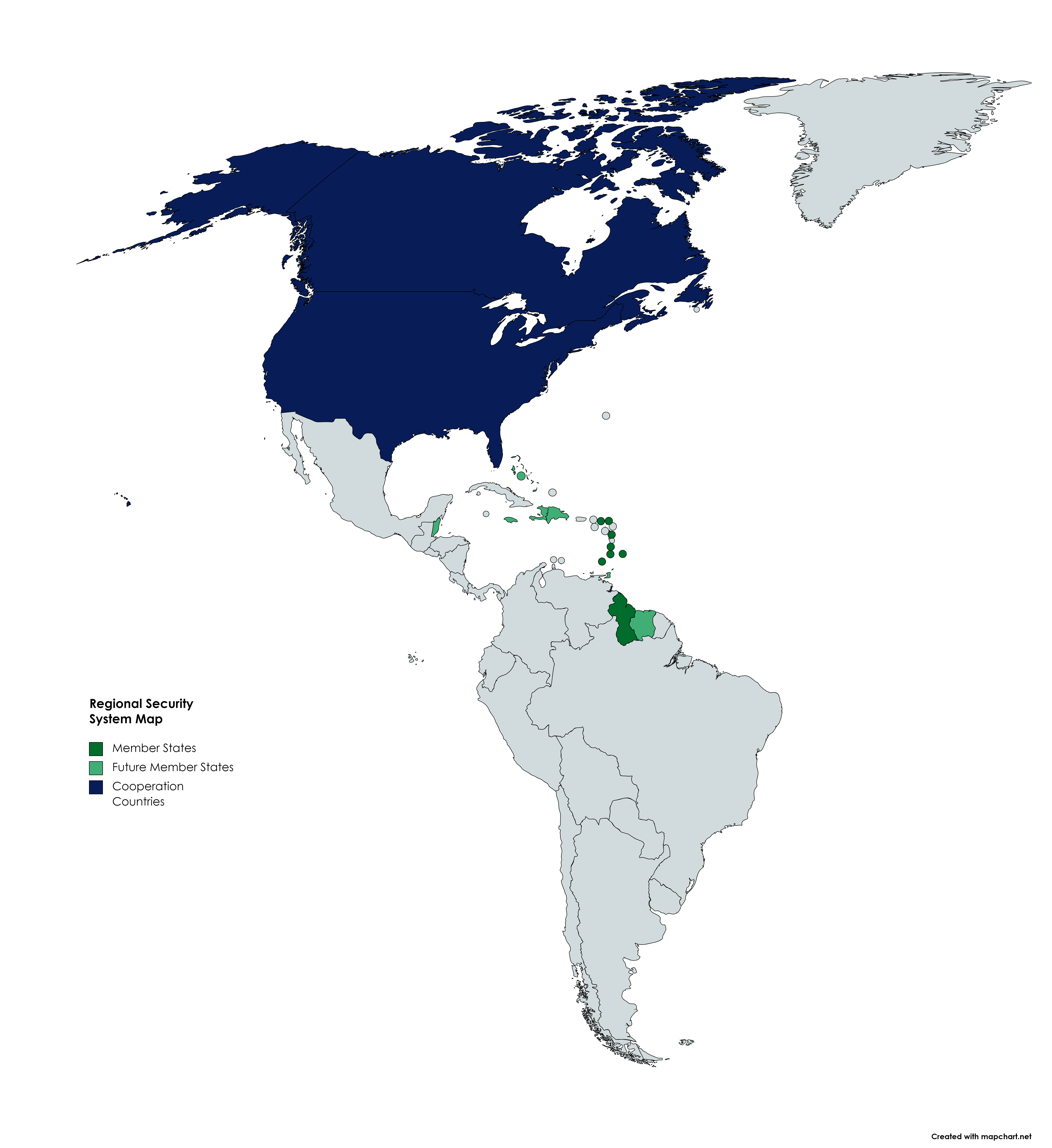
- Base: Grantley Adams International Airport
- Type: Military alliance
- Time zone: UTC-4 (AST)

The Regional Security System (RSS); Spanish: Sistema de Seguridad Regional; is an international agreement for the defence and security of the eastern Caribbean and wider Caribbean South America region.

== History ==
The Regional Security System was created in 1982 to counter threats to the stability of the region in the late 1970s and early 1980s. On 29 October, four members of the Organisation of Eastern Caribbean States (Antigua and Barbuda, Dominica, Saint Lucia, and Saint Vincent and the Grenadines) signed a memorandum of understanding (MOU) with Barbados to provide for "mutual assistance on request". The signatories agreed to prepare contingency plans and assist one another, on request, in national emergencies, prevention of smuggling, search and rescue, immigration control, fishery protection, customs and excise control, maritime policing duties, protection of off-shore installations, pollution control, national and other disasters, and threats to national security. Saint Kitts and Nevis joined following independence in 1983, and Grenada followed two years later after Operation Urgent Fury, a combined US and RSS invasion of the country. The MOU was updated in 1992 and the system acquired juridical status on 5 March 1996 under the Treaty which was signed at St. Georges, Grenada.

The RSS initially started as a US instrument to combat the spread of communism in the Caribbean region. As of 2001, the RSS further cooperates with the CARICOM Regional Task Force on Crime and Security (CRTFCS).

In June 2010, United States and Caribbean regional officials resumed a plan for close cooperation established under the former Partnership for Prosperity and Security in the Caribbean (PPS) from the Clinton administration. As part of the joint agreement the United States pledged assistance with the creation of an Eastern Caribbean Coast Guard unit among RSS countries. The United States Coast Guard unit will underpin the wider US-Caribbean Basin Security Initiative (CBSI) which has deemed the RSS as "central to the CBSI’s success, given its reach across the Eastern Caribbean."

Subsequently, Canada also pledged collaboration with the RSS bloc to combat a threat of Central American criminal gangs from expanding into the English-speaking Caribbean region.

In 2022, following the International Energy Conference and Expo Guyana 2022, it was declared that the Republic of Guyana would be signing onto the protocol as a member of the RSS. In September 2022, Guyana formally joined the RSS after the president of Guyana signed the Instrument of Accession.

== Operations ==
The RSS is based in Barbados at the Paragon Centre, headed by many regional army chiefs. It mainly serves as a defence system for the Caribbean Sea, conducting many operations by detecting and combating cross-Atlantic and intra-Caribbean drug smuggling, protection of the sovereignty of the nations of the Caribbean, providing assistance to Caribbean countries at the request of governments and are usually the first to respond after natural disasters occur, such as hurricanes, floods and earthquakes.

Date	RSS operation name where known	Country	Reason
1983	Grenada Intervention Operation	Grenada	Restore a government in Grenada. US military participation (Operation Urgent Fury).
1989		Antigua and Barbuda, Montserrat and Saint Kitts and Nevis	Assistance in aftermath of Hurricane Hugo
1990		Trinidad and Tobago	Aftermath of Jamaat al Muslimeen coup attempt in Trinidad and Tobago.
1994		Saint Kitts and Nevis	Prison riot
1995		Antigua and Barbuda and Saint Kitts and Nevis	Assistance in aftermath of Hurricane Luis and Hurricane Marilyn
1998		Saint Kitts and Nevis	Assistance in aftermath of Hurricane Georges
1998	Operation Weedeater	Saint Vincent and the Grenadines	Eradication of cannabis
2003	Operation Bordelais	Saint Lucia	Transfer prisoners to new prison facility
2004	Ivan Relief Efforts	Grenada	Assistance in aftermath of Hurricane Ivan
2006		Barbados	Prison uprising in Glendairy
2009	Operation VINCYPAC	Saint Vincent and the Grenadines	Eradication of cannabis
2010		Haiti	Assistance in aftermath of the Haiti 2010 earthquake
2017		Dominica	Assistance in aftermath of the Hurricane Maria in 2017. RSS was instrumental in the restoration of order after widespread looting and destruction of property

== Member states ==
The current member nations are:

- Antigua and Barbuda (since 1982)
- Barbados (since 1982)
- Dominica (since 1982)
- Grenada (since 1985)
- Guyana (since 2022)
- Saint Kitts and Nevis (since 1983)
- Saint Lucia (since 1982)
- Saint Vincent and the Grenadines (since 1982)

== See also ==
- Military alliance
- List of military alliances
- Ameripol
- Caribbean Peace Force
- North Atlantic Treaty Organization (NATO)
- Rio Pact
- Royal Canadian Mounted Police (RCMP)
- United States Southern Command (USSOUTHCOM)
- Caribbean Disaster Emergency Response Agency (CDERA)
- Organisation of Eastern Caribbean States (OECS)
- Pacific Islands Forum
