= Caribbean Peace Force =

Peacekeeping coalition that operated in Grenada after the 1983 American invasion

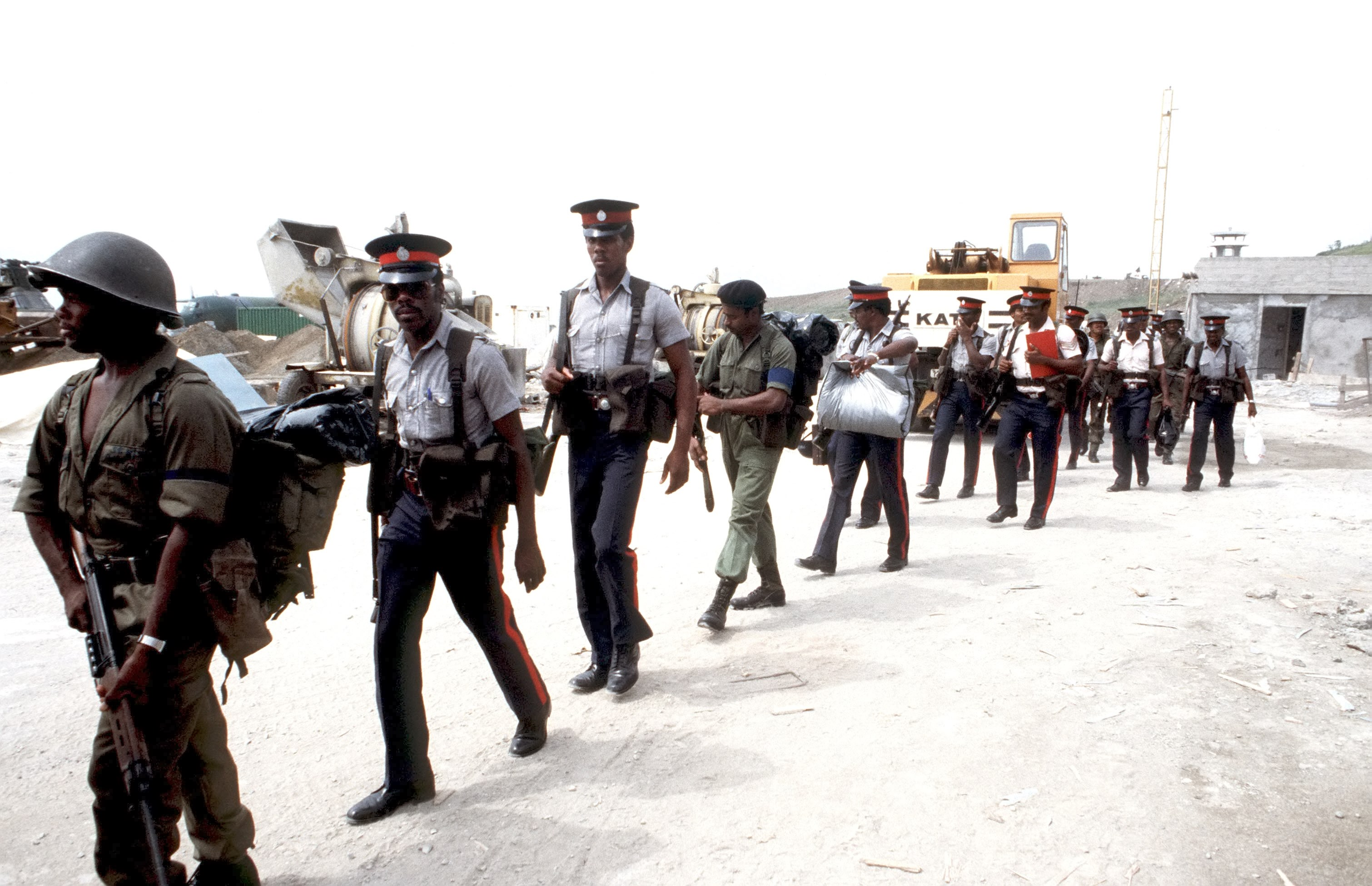
Members of the Eastern Caribbean Defence Force participate in Operation Urgent Fury. Includes Royal Barbados Police Force personnel and soldiers of unknown nationality. 3 November 1983

The Caribbean Peace Force (CPF), also known as the Caribbean Peacekeeping Force and the Eastern Caribbean Peace Force (ECPF), was a 350-member peacekeeping force operating in Grenada from October 1983 to June 1985 after the Invasion of Grenada, codenamed Operation Urgent Fury. The military intervention by the United States of America in coalition with six Caribbean nations was in response to the deposition and execution of Grenadan Prime Minister Maurice Bishop on Oct. 19, 1983. Bishop's revolutionary regime was briefly replaced by a military junta composed entirely of Grenadian military officers. On October 25, 1983, the United States, Barbados, Jamaica and members of the Organisation of Eastern Caribbean States landed on Grenada, defeated Grenadian and Cuban resistance and overthrew the military government of Hudson Austin.

The U.S-led invasion was spearheaded at dawn by Army Rangers, Navy SEALs, Marines and other elite units. The first Caribbean forces arrived on Grenada by U.S. Air Force C-130 aircraft from Barbados about five hours later. The vanguard force, led by Brigadier Rudyard Lewis of Barbados, landed on a Ranger-seized runway without any defined military role being assigned to them by the Pentagon. An ad hoc plan was developed for them to guard Cuban and Grenadian prisoners who were being captured in mounting numbers by U.S. combat troops, Later, the Caribbean troops took over police duties in St. George's, the island's capital, and guard duties at Richmond Hill Prison. The peacekeeper force was mostly composed of 150 soldiers from the Jamaica Defence Force and a 50-man rifle platoon from the Barbados Defence Force. Antigua and Barbuda also contributed an infantry squad. The remaining members were police or paramilitary constabulary from Barbados, Dominica, St. Lucia, St. Vincent and the Grenadines and St. Kitts and Nevis. These five Eastern Caribbean island nations were then participants in a Regional Security System.

The Caribbean peacekeepers were not involved in combat, which officially ended on Nov. 2, 1983. U.S. combat troops left the island on Dec. 12, 1983. The peacekeeping force remained on Grenada until the spring of 1985 to allow the reconstituted domestic police force to be fully trained and equipped.
