= United States invasion of Grenada =

1983 United States-led military invasion

- Part of the Cold War
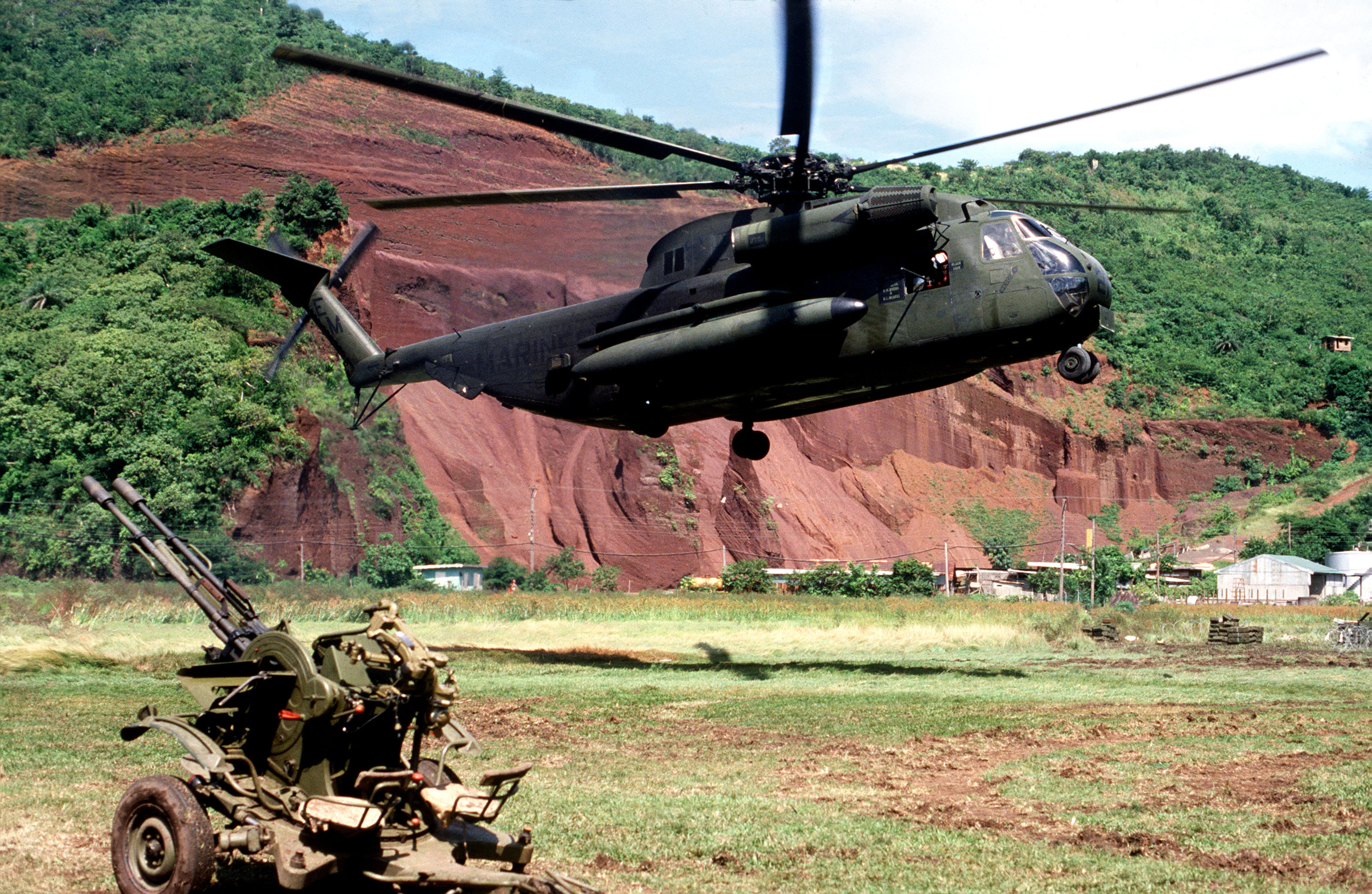
- An American Sikorsky CH-53 Sea Stallion helicopter hovers above the ground near an abandoned Soviet ZU-23-2 anti-aircraft gun during the American invasion of Grenada, 1983.
Date	25 October – 2 November 1983 (8 days)
Location	Grenada
Result	American–CPF & Grenadian Opposition victory; Grenadian People's Revolutionary Government toppled; Hudson Austin deposed; Nicholas Brathwaite sworn into office; Cuban and Soviet forces expelled

Belligerents
United States; Grenadian Opposition: Caribbean Peace Force: Barbados; Jamaica; Organisation of Eastern Caribbean States; Antigua and Barbuda; Dominica; Saint Kitts and Nevis; Saint Lucia; Saint Vincent and the Grenadines	Grenada (PRG); People's Revolutionary Army; People's Revolutionary Militia; Republic of Cuba; Cuban Revolutionary Armed Forces; Supported by: Soviet Union

Commanders and leaders
(United States) Ronald Reagan; (United States) Caspar Weinberger; (United States) Joseph Metcalf III; (United States) Norman Schwarzkopf; (United States) Edward Trobaugh; (United States) Jack B. Farris; (Grenada) Paul Scoon; (Grenada) Nicholas Brathwaite; (Barbados) Tom Adams; (Barbados) Rudyard Lewis; (Jamaica) Florizel Glasspole; (Jamaica) Edward Seaga; (Antigua and Barbuda) Wilfred Jacobs; (Antigua and Barbuda) Vere Bird; (Dominica) Aurelius Marie; (Dominica) Eugenia Charles; (Saint Kitts and Nevis) Clement Arrindell; (Saint Kitts and Nevis) Kennedy Simmonds; (Saint Lucia) Allen Montgomery Lewis; (Saint Lucia) John Compton; (Saint Vincent and the Grenadines) Sydney Gun-Munro; (Saint Vincent and the Grenadines) Milton Cato	(Grenada) Hudson Austin (surrendered); (Cuba) Fidel Castro; (Cuba) Pedro Tortoló (surrendered)

Strength
United States: 7,300 troops; 4 tanks; 1 LPH USS Guam Flagship ComPhibron; 1 LHA (USS Saipan (LHA-2)); 1 aircraft carrier (USS Independence); 3 destroyers; 2 frigates; 1 ammunition ship; 27 F-14A Tomcats; CPF: 353 peacekeepers	Grenada: 1,300 troops; 8 APCs; 2 armored cars; 12 AA guns; Cuba: 784 (including 636 armed construction workers)

Casualties and losses
United States: 19 to 24 killed; 36 to 116 wounded; 9 helicopters destroyed	Grenada: 21 to 45 killed; 358 wounded; 6 APCs destroyed; 1 armored car destroyed; Cuba: 24 killed; 59 wounded; 638 captured; 2 transport aircraft captured; Soviet Union: 2 wounded; Weapons cache seized: 12 APCs; 12 anti-aircraft guns; 291 submachine guns; 6,330 rifles; 5.6 million rounds of ammunition
- 24 civilians killed (18 of them when a mental hospital was mistakenly bombed by U.S. Navy A-7s)

The United States and a coalition of Caribbean countries (Note: Antigua and Barbuda, Barbados, Dominica, Jamaica, Saint Kitts and Nevis, Saint Lucia, and Saint Vincent and the Grenadines) invaded the island nation of Grenada at dawn on 25 October 1983. It was codenamed Operation Urgent Fury by the U.S. military, and resulted in military occupation within a few days. It was triggered by strife within the People's Revolutionary Government, which led to the house arrest and execution of the previous leader and second Prime Minister of Grenada, Maurice Bishop, and to the establishment of the Revolutionary Military Council, with Hudson Austin as chairman. Following the invasion there was an interim government appointed, and then general elections held in December 1984.

The invasion drew criticism from many countries. British Prime Minister Margaret Thatcher privately disapproved of the mission, in part because she was not consulted in advance and was given very short notice of the military operation, despite Grenada being a member of the Commonwealth, with Queen Elizabeth II as its head of state. However, she supported the invasion in public. On October 28, 1983, three days after the invasion, the U.N. Security Council cast a vote on a resolution "deeply deploring" the invasion, calling it a "flagrant violation of international law"; the vote was 11 in favor, one against, but failed to pass (the United States vetoed the resolution). The United Nations General Assembly condemned it as "a flagrant violation of international law" on 2 November 1983, by a vote of 108 to 9.

The invading force consisted of the 1st and 2nd battalions of the U.S. Army's 75th Ranger Regiment, the 82nd Airborne Division, and elements of the former Rapid Deployment Force, U.S. Marines, U.S. Army Delta Force, Navy SEALs, and a small group Air Force TACPs from the 21st TASS Shaw AFB ancillary forces, totaling 7,600 troops, together with Jamaican forces and troops of the Regional Security System (RSS). The invaders quickly defeated Grenadian resistance after a low-altitude assault by the Rangers and 82nd Airborne at Point Salines Airport on the island's south end, and a Marine helicopter and amphibious landing at Pearls Airport on the north end. Austin's military government was deposed. An advisory council was designated by Sir Paul Scoon, Governor-General of Grenada, to administer the government until the 1984 elections.

The invasion date of 25 October is now a national holiday in Grenada, called Thanksgiving Day, commemorating the freeing of several political prisoners who were subsequently elected to office. A truth and reconciliation commission was launched in 2001 to re-examine some of the controversies of that tumultuous period in the 1980s; in particular, the commission made an unsuccessful attempt to locate the remains of Maurice Bishop's body, which had been disposed of at Austin's order and never found.

The invasion exposed communication and coordination problems between the different branches of the U.S. military when operating together as a joint force. This triggered post-action investigations resulting in sweeping operational changes in the form of the Goldwater–Nichols Department of Defense Reorganization Act.

== Background ==
In 1974, Sir Eric Gairy led Grenada to independence from the United Kingdom, but his term in office was marred by civil unrest. Although his Grenada United Labour Party claimed victory in the general election of 1976, the opposition did not accept the result as legitimate. During his tenure, many Grenadians believed Gairy was personally responsible for the economic decline of the island and accused him of corruption. The civil unrest took the form of street violence between Gairy's private militia, the Mongoose Gang, and a militia organized by the communist New Jewel Movement (NJM) party.

On 13 March 1979, while Gairy was temporarily out of the country, Maurice Bishop and his NJM seized power in a nearly bloodless coup. He established the People's Revolutionary Government, suspended the constitution, and detained several political prisoners. Bishop was a forceful speaker who introduced Marxist ideology to Grenadians while also appealing to Black Americans during the 1970s heyday of the Black Panther movement. After seizing power, Bishop attempted to implement the first Marxist-Leninist nation in the British Commonwealth. To lend itself an appearance of constitutional legitimacy, the new administration continued to recognize Queen Elizabeth II as Queen of Grenada and Sir Paul Scoon as her viceregal representative.

=== Airport ===
The Bishop government began constructing the Point Salines International Airport with the help of the United Kingdom, Cuba, Libya, Algeria, and other nations. The British government proposed the airport in 1954 when Grenada was still a British colony. Canadians designed it, the British government underwrote it, and workers, including some Cubans, built it. The U.S. government accused Grenada of constructing facilities to aid a Soviet–Cuban military buildup in the Caribbean. The accusation was based on the fact that the new airport's 9,000-foot (2,700 m) runway would be able to accommodate the largest Soviet aircraft, such as the An-12, An-22, and An-124. Such a facility, according to the U.S., would enhance the Soviet and Cuban transportation of weapons to Central American insurgents and expand Soviet regional influence. Bishop's government claimed that the airport was built to handle commercial aircraft carrying tourists, pointing out that such jets could not land at Pearls Airport with its 5,200-foot (1,600 m) runway on the island's north end, and that Pearls could not be expanded because its runway abutted a mountain on one side and the ocean on the other.

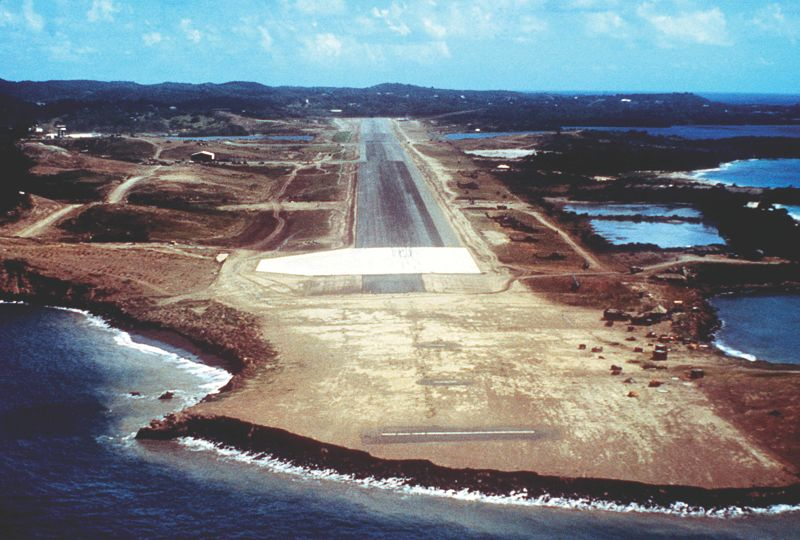
Point Salines International Airport

In 1983, Representative Ron Dellums (D-CA) traveled to Grenada on a fact-finding mission, having been invited by Prime Minister Bishop. Dellums described his findings before Congress:

Based on my personal observations, discussion, and analysis of the new international airport under construction in Grenada, it is my conclusion that this project is specifically now and has always been for the purpose of economic development and is not for military use. ... It is my thought that it is absurd, patronizing, and totally unwarranted for the United States government to charge that this airport poses a military threat to the United States' national security.

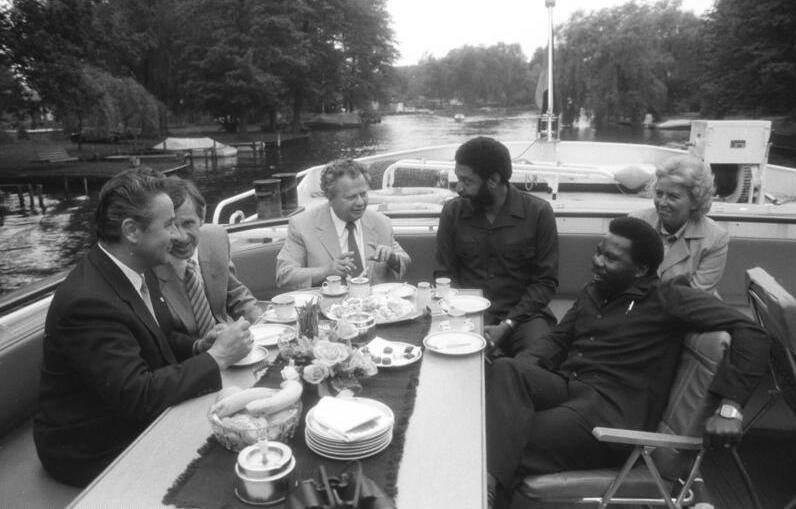
Maurice Bishop and Foreign Minister Unison Whiteman in East Germany, 1982

In March 1983, President Reagan began issuing warnings about the danger to the United States and Caribbean nations if the Soviet–Cuban militarization of that region was allowed to proceed. He pointed to the excessively long airport runway being built and referenced intelligence reports showing increased Soviet interest in the island. He said the runway, along with the airport's numerous fuel storage tanks, were unnecessary for commercial flights and that the evidence suggested the airport would become a Cuban-Soviet forward military airbase.

Meanwhile, an internal power struggle was brewing in Grenada over Bishop's leadership performance. In September 1983 at a Central Committee party meeting, he was pressured into sharing power with Deputy Prime Minister Bernard Coard. Bishop initially agreed to the joint leadership proposal, but later balked at the idea, which brought matters to a crisis.

=== Connection to Beirut barracks bombing ===
Two days prior to the United States' invasion of Grenada, U.S. Marines in Beirut suffered heavy casualties in the 1983 Beirut barracks bombings. The terrorist bombing in Beirut killed 241 American servicemen, the deadliest single attack on Americans overseas since World War II. American Experience suggested the invasion of Grenada was meant to distract the public from the 1983 Beirut barracks bombing: "By the time of the 1984 election, the Grenada success replaced the bitter memory of the massacre at Lebanon."

=== October 1983 ===
On the evening of 13 October 1983, the Coard faction of the Central Committee, in conjunction with the People's Revolutionary Army, placed Prime Minister Bishop and several of his allies under house arrest. On 19 October, after Bishop's secret detention became widely known, he was freed by a large crowd of supporters, estimated between 15,000 and 30,000. He led the crowd to a relatively unguarded Fort Rupert (later renamed Fort George) which they soon occupied. At nearby Fort Frederick, Coard had gathered nine Central Committee members and sizable factions of the military. As one journalist writes, "What happened next, and on whose orders, is still a controversy." A mass of troops in armored personnel carriers, under the supervision of Lt. Colonel Ewart Layne, departed Fort Frederick for Fort Rupert to, as Layne described it, "recapture the fort and restore order". After surrendering to the superior force, Bishop and seven leaders loyal to him were lined up against a wall in Fort Rupert's courtyard and executed by a firing squad.

The army under Hudson Austin then stepped in and formed a military council to rule the country, and placed Sir Paul Scoon under house arrest in Government House. The army instituted a strict four-day curfew during which anyone seen on the streets would be shot on sight.

Within only a few days of these events in Grenada, the Reagan administration mounted a U.S.-led military intervention following a formal appeal for help from the Organisation of Eastern Caribbean States, which had received a covert request for help from Paul Scoon (though he put off signing the official letter of invitation until 26 October). Among the key invasion planners were Secretary of Defense Caspar Weinberger and his senior military assistant Colin Powell. Regarding the speed with which the invasion commenced, it was said the U.S. had been conducting mock invasions of Grenada since 1981: "These exercises, part of Ocean Venture '81 and known as Operation Amber and the Amberdines, involved air and amphibious assaults on the Puerto Rican island of Vieques. According to the plans for these maneuvers, 'Amber' was considered a hypothetical island in the Eastern Caribbean which had engaged in anti-democratic revolutionary activities."

Reagan stated that he felt compelled to act due to "concerns over the 600 U.S. medical students on the island" and fears of a repeat of the Iran hostage crisis, which ended less than three years earlier. Future U.S. Secretary of State Lawrence Eagleburger, who was then serving as Reagan's Under Secretary of State for Political Affairs, later said that the prime motivation for the intervention was to "get rid" of the coup leader Hudson Austin, and that the students were a pretext. Although the invasion occurred after the execution of Prime Minister Bishop, the remaining Grenadian ruling party members were still committed to Bishop's Marxist ideology. Reagan said he viewed these factors, alongside the party's growing connection to Fidel Castro, as a threat to democracy.

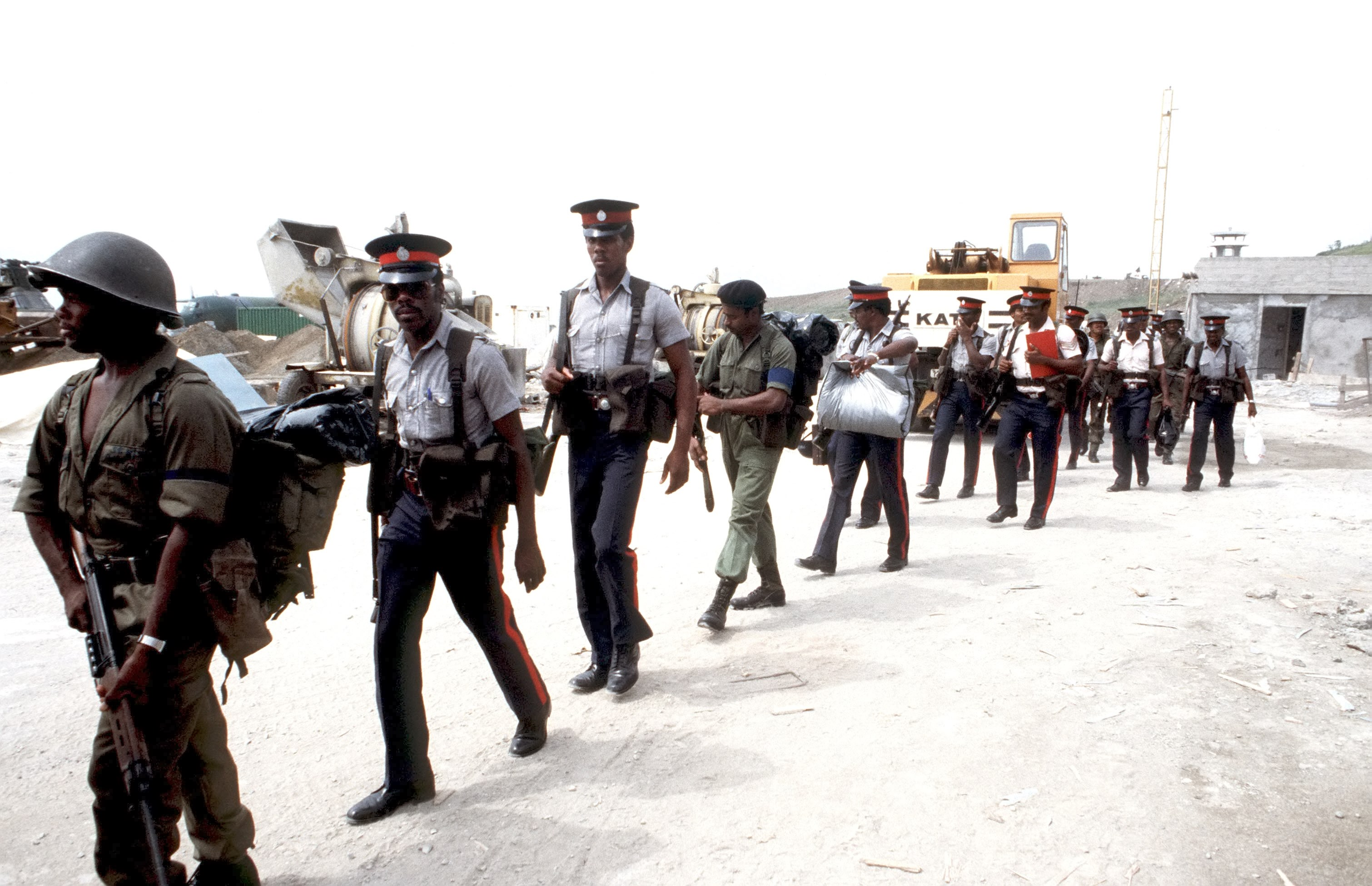
Members of the Eastern Caribbean Defense Force

The Organization of Eastern Caribbean States (OECS), Barbados, and Jamaica all appealed to the United States for assistance. For safety reasons, Paul Scoon had requested the invasion through secret diplomatic channels, using the reserve powers vested in the Crown. On 22 October 1983, the Deputy High Commissioner in Bridgetown, Barbados, visited Grenada and reported that Scoon was well and "did not request military intervention, either directly or indirectly". However, on the day after the invasion, Prime Minister of Dominica Eugenia Charles stated the request had come from Scoon, through the OECS, and, in his 2003 autobiography, Survival for Service, Scoon maintains he asked the visiting British diplomat to pass along "an oral request" for outside military intervention at this meeting.

On 25 October, the combined forces of the United States and the Regional Security System (RSS) based in Barbados invaded Grenada in an operation codenamed Operation Urgent Fury. The United States insisted this was being done at the request of Barbados' Prime Minister Tom Adams and Dominica's Prime Minister Eugenia Charles. The invasion was sharply criticized by the governments in Canada, Trinidad and Tobago, and the United Kingdom. By a vote of 108 to 9, with 27 abstentions, the United Nations General Assembly condemned it as "a flagrant violation of international law".

== First day of the invasion ==
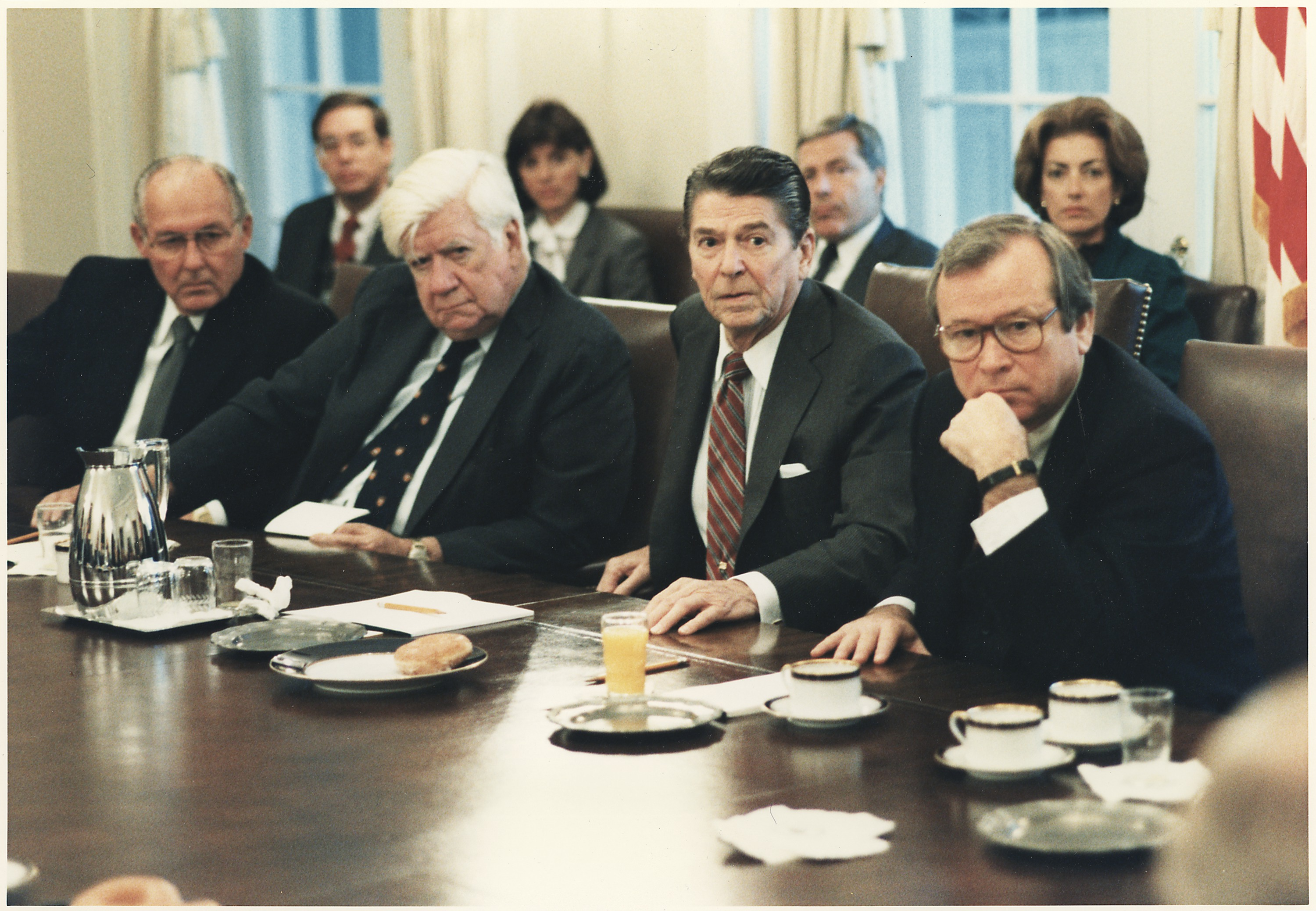
President Reagan meeting with Congress on the invasion of Grenada in the Cabinet Room, 25 October 1983

H-hour for the invasion was set for 05:00 on 25 October 1983. U.S. troops deployed for Grenada by helicopter from Grantley Adams International Airport on Barbados before daybreak. Nearly simultaneously, American paratroopers arrived directly by transport aircraft from bases in the eastern United States, and U.S. Marines were airlifted to the island from USS Guam offshore. It was the largest American military action since the Vietnam War. Vice Admiral Joseph Metcalf III, Commander of the Second Fleet, was the overall commander of American forces, designated Joint Task Force 120, which included elements of each military service and multiple special operations units. Fighting continued for several days and the total number of American troops reached some 7,000 along with 300 troops from the Organization of American States, commanded by Brigadier Rudyard Lewis of Barbados.

The main objectives on the first day were for the 75th Ranger Regiment to capture Point Salines International Airport in order for the 82nd Airborne Division to land reinforcements on the island; the 2nd Battalion, 8th Marine Regiment to capture Pearls Airport; and other forces to rescue the American students at the True Blue Campus of St. George's University. In addition, a number of special operations missions were undertaken by Army Delta Force operatives and Navy SEALs to obtain intelligence and secure key individuals and equipment. Many of these missions were plagued by inadequate intelligence and planning; the American troops used tourist maps with military grids superimposed on them.

=== Defending forces ===
==== People's Revolutionary Army ====
The invading forces encountered about 1,500 Grenadian soldiers of the People's Revolutionary Army (PRA) manning defensive positions. The PRA troops were for the most part equipped with light weapons, mostly Kalashnikov-pattern automatic rifles of Soviet bloc origin and semiautomatic Czechoslovak Vz. 52 carbines, along with smaller numbers of obsolete SKS carbines and PPSh-41 submachine guns. They had few heavy weapons and no modern air defense systems. The PRA was not regarded as a serious military threat by the U.S., which was more concerned by the possibility that Cuba would send a large expeditionary force to intervene on behalf of its erstwhile ally.

The PRA did possess eight BTR-60PB armored personnel carriers and two BRDM-2 armored cars delivered as military aid from the Soviet Union in February 1981, but no tanks.

==== Cuban forces in Grenada ====
The Cuban military presence in Grenada was more complex than initially evaluated by the U.S. Most of the Cuban civilian expatriates present were also military reservists. Fidel Castro described the Cuban construction crews in Grenada as "workers and soldiers at the same time", claiming the dual nature of their role was consistent with Cuba's "citizen soldier" tradition. At the time of the invasion, there were an estimated 784 Cuban nationals on the island. About 630 of the Cuban nationals listed their occupations as construction workers, another 64 as military personnel, and 18 as dependents. The remainder were medical staff or teachers.

Colonel Pedro Tortoló Comas who was the highest-ranking Cuban military officer in Grenada in 1983 was evacuated from the Soviet Embassy via Mérida, Mexico back to Havana by a Soviet commercial airplane. He later stated that he issued small arms and ammunition to the construction workers for the purpose of self-defense during the invasion, which may have further blurred the line between their status as civilians and combatants. They were also expressly forbidden to surrender to U.S. military forces if approached. The regular Cuban military personnel on the island were serving as advisers to the PRA at the time. Cuban advisers and instructors deployed with overseas military missions were not confined to non-combat and technical support roles; if the units to which they were attached participated in an engagement, they were expected to fight alongside their foreign counterparts.

Bob Woodward wrote in Veil that captured "military advisors" from socialist countries, including Cuba, were actually accredited diplomats and their dependents. He claimed that none of them took any actual part in the fighting. The U.S. government asserted that most of the supposed Cuban civilian technicians on Grenada were in fact military personnel, including special forces and combat engineers. A summary of the Cuban presence in The Engineer, the official periodical of the U.S. Army Engineer School, noted that "resistance from these well-armed military and paramilitary forces belied claims that they were simply construction crews."

=== Navy SEAL reconnaissance missions ===
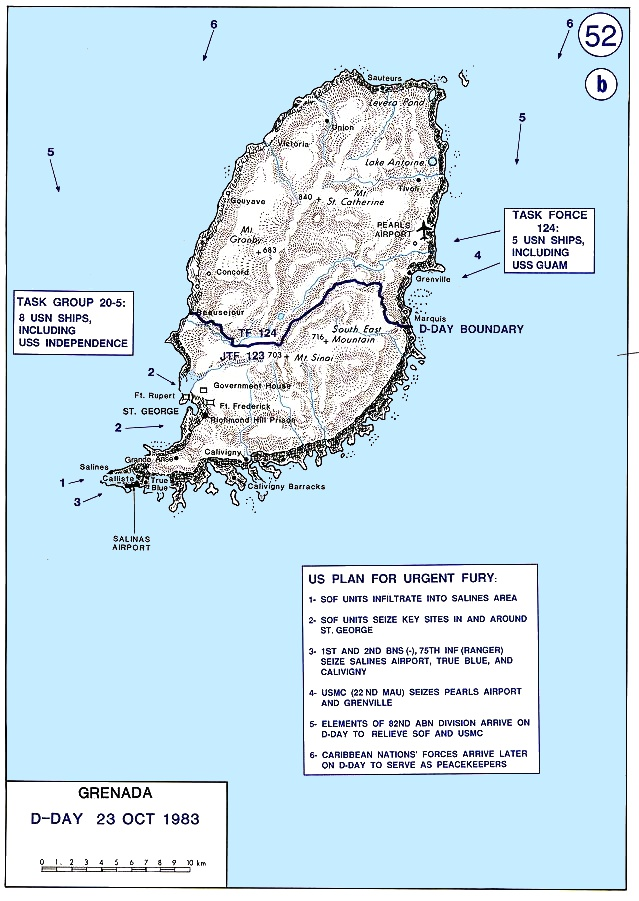
Map of invasion plan

U.S. Special Operations Forces were deployed to Grenada beginning on 23 October, before the 25 October invasion. Navy SEALs from SEAL Team 6 and Air Force combat controllers were air-dropped at sea to perform a reconnaissance mission on Point Salines. The helicopter drop went wrong; four SEALs were lost at sea and their bodies never recovered, causing most people to suspect they had drowned. The four SEALs were Machinist Mate 1st Class Kenneth J. Butcher, Quartermaster 1st Class Kevin E. Lundberg, Hull Technician 1st Class Stephen L. Morris, and Senior Chief Engineman Robert R. Schamberger. In an interview conducted by Bill Salisbury and published on 4 October 1990, Kenneth Butcher's widow said that she had gone to Grenada hoping that her husband had survived. She said, "There was this fisherman who said he saw four guys in wetsuits come out of the water, and then two days later he saw four bodies being thrown into the water. So we would like to think they made it, 'cause there was a boat smashed up on the beach. We would like to think the four of them got in that boat, made it to shore, got someplace, and were captured. And they're, you know, gonna come back." The SEAL and Air Force survivors continued their mission, but their boats flooded while evading a patrol boat, causing the mission to be aborted. Another SEAL mission on 24 October was also unsuccessful, due to harsh weather, resulting in little intelligence being gathered in advance of the impending intervention.

=== Air assault on Point Salines ===
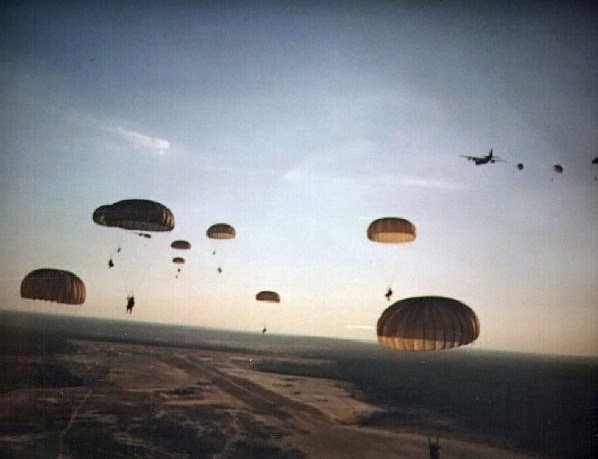
Rangers conducting the air assault on Point Salines

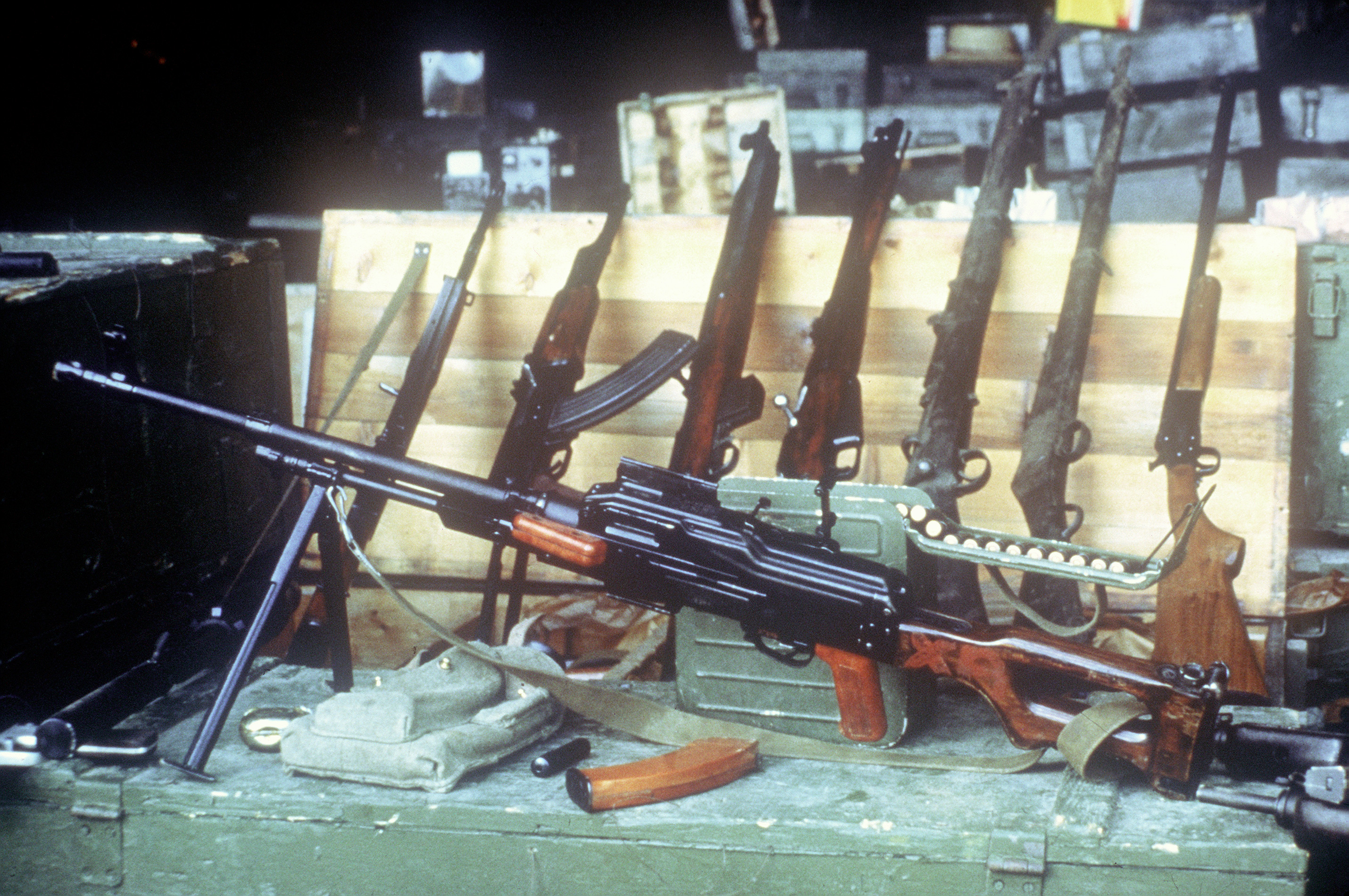
A Soviet-made 7.62mm PKM light machine gun and other weapons seized during Operation Urgent Fury, c. 25 October 1983

Alpha and Bravo companies of the 1st Battalion of the 75th Ranger Regiment embarked on C-130s at Hunter Army Airfield at midnight on 25 October to perform an air assault landing on Point Salines Airport, intending to land at the airport and then disembark. The Rangers had to switch abruptly to a parachute landing when they learned mid-flight that the runway was obstructed. The air drop began at 05:30 on 25 October in the face of moderate resistance from ZU-23 anti-aircraft guns and several BTR-60 armored personnel carriers (APCs), which were knocked out by M67 recoilless rifle fire. AC-130 gunships provided support for the landing. Cuban construction vehicles were commandeered to help clear the airfield, and one even used to provide mobile cover for the Rangers as they moved to seize the heights surrounding the airfield.

The Rangers cleared the airstrip of obstructions by 10:00, and transport planes were able to land and unload additional reinforcements, including M151 Jeeps and members of the Caribbean Peace Force assigned to guard the perimeter and detainees. Starting at 14:00, units began landing at Point Salines from the 82nd Airborne Division under Edward Trobaugh, including battalions of the 325th Infantry Regiment. At 15:30, three BTR-60s of the Grenadian Army Motorized Company counter-attacked, but the Americans repelled them with recoilless rifles and an AC-130.

The Rangers fanned out and secured the surrounding area, negotiating the surrender of over 100 Cubans in an aviation hangar. However, a Jeep-mounted Ranger patrol became lost searching for True Blue Campus and was ambushed, with four killed. The Rangers eventually secured True Blue campus and its students, where they found only 140 students and were told that more were at another campus in Grand Anse, northeast of True Blue. In all, the Rangers lost five men on the first day, but succeeded in securing Point Salines and the surrounding area.

=== Capture of Pearls Airport ===
A platoon of Navy SEALs from SEAL Team 4 under Lieutenant Mike Walsh approached the beach near Pearls Airport around midnight on 25 October after evading patrol boats and overcoming stormy weather. They found that the beach was lightly defended but unsuitable for an amphibious landing. The 2nd Battalion of the 8th Marine Regiment then landed south of Pearls Airport using CH-46 Sea Knight and CH-53 Sea Stallion helicopters at 05:30 on 25 October; they captured Pearls Airport, encountering only light resistance, including a DShK machine gun which a Marine AH-1 Cobra destroyed.

=== Raid on Radio Free Grenada ===
UH-60 Blackhawk helicopters delivered SEAL Team 6 operators in the early morning of 25 October to Radio Free Grenada with the purpose of using the radio station for psychological operations. They captured the station unopposed and destroyed the radio transmitter. However, they were attacked by Grenadian forces in cars and an armored personnel carrier (APC), which forced the lightly armed SEALs to cut open a fence and retreat into the ocean while receiving fire from the APC. The SEALs then reportedly swam to USS Caron. They swam toward the open sea, and were picked up several hours later after being spotted by a reconnaissance plane.

=== Raids on Fort Rupert and Richmond Hill Prison ===
On 25 October, Delta Force's A and B squadrons, and C Company, 1st Ranger Battalion embarked in UH-60 and MH-6 Little Bird helicopters of Task Force 160 to capture Fort Rupert (now known as Fort George), where they believed the Revolutionary Council leaders lived, and Richmond Hill Prison, where political prisoners were being held. The raid on Richmond Hill Prison lacked vital intelligence, leaving the attackers unaware of the presence of several anti-aircraft guns and steep hilly terrain that left no room for helicopter landings. Anti-aircraft fire wounded passengers and crew and forced one UH-60 helicopter to crash land, causing another helicopter to land next to it to protect the survivors. One pilot was killed, and the Delta Force operators had to be relieved by a Navy Sea King helicopter. The raid on Fort Rupert, however, was successful in capturing several leaders of the People's Revolutionary Government.

=== Mission to rescue Governor-General Scoon ===
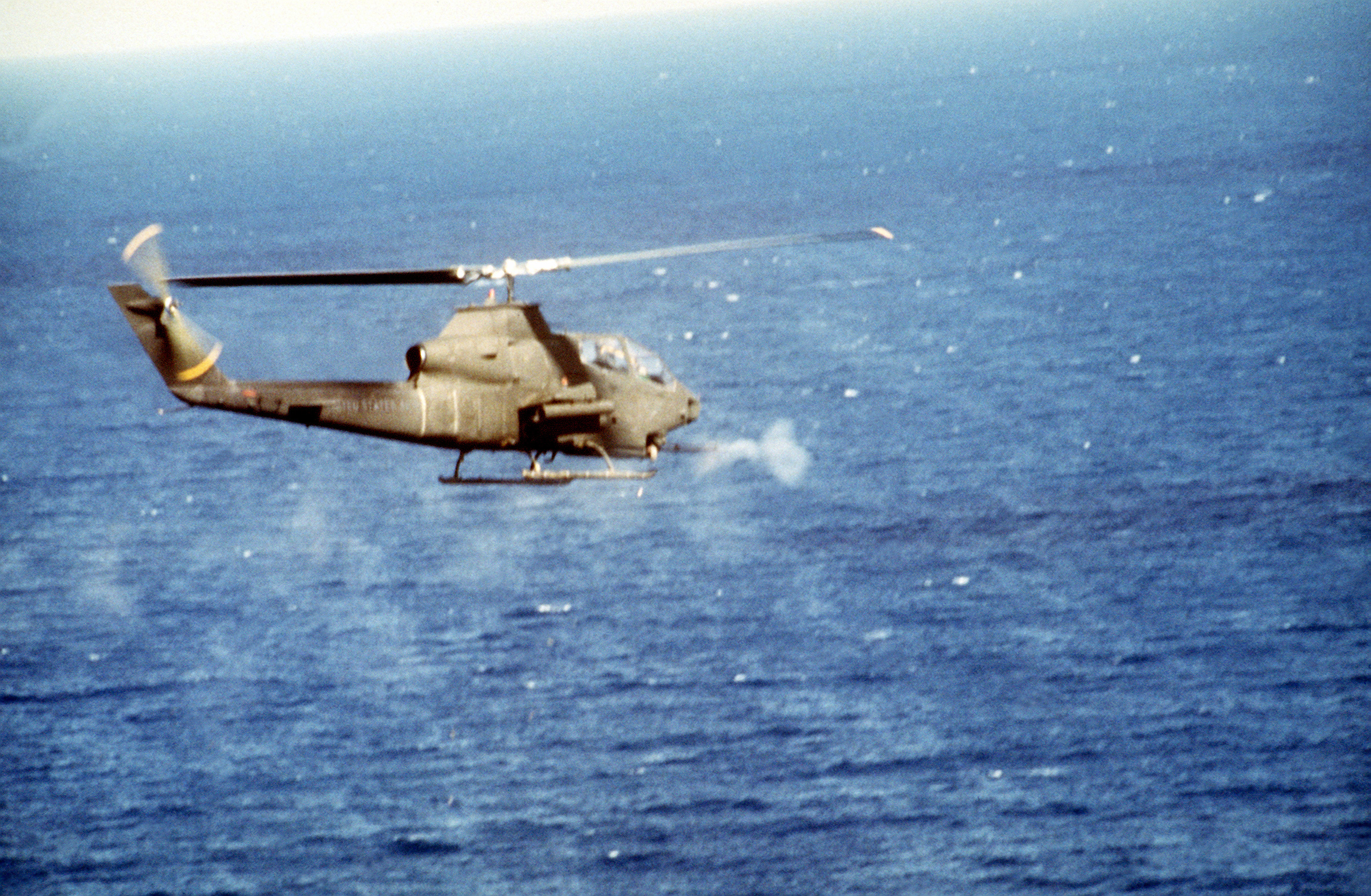
A U.S. Army AH-1S Cobra attack helicopter opens fire on an enemy position.

The last major special operation was a mission to rescue Governor-General Scoon from his mansion in Saint George, Grenada. The mission departed late at 05:30 on 25 October from Barbados, resulting in the Grenadian forces being already aware of the invasion and they guarded Scoon closely. The SEAL team entered the mansion without opposition, but BTR-60 armored personnel carriers counter-attacked and trapped the SEALs and governor inside. AC-130 gunships, A-7 Corsair strike planes, and AH-1 Cobra attack helicopters were called in to support the besieged SEALs, but they remained trapped for the next 24 hours.

At 19:00 on 25 October, 250 Marines from G Company of the 2nd Battalion, 8th Marine Regiment landed at Grand Mal Bay equipped with amphibious assault vehicles and four M60 Patton tanks; they relieved the Navy SEALs the following morning, allowing Governor Scoon, his wife, and nine aides to be safely evacuated at 10:00 that day. The Marine tank crews continued advancing in the face of sporadic resistance, knocking out a BRDM-2 armored car. G Company subsequently defeated and overwhelmed the Grenadian defenders at Fort Frederick.

=== Airstrikes ===
Navy A-7 Corsairs and Marine AH-1 Cobra attack helicopters made airstrikes against Fort Rupert and Fort Frederick. An A-7 raid on Fort Frederick targeting anti-aircraft guns hit a nearby mental hospital, killing 18 civilians. Two Marine AH-1T Cobras and a UH-60 Blackhawk were shot down in a raid against Fort Frederick, resulting in five casualties.

== Second day of the invasion ==
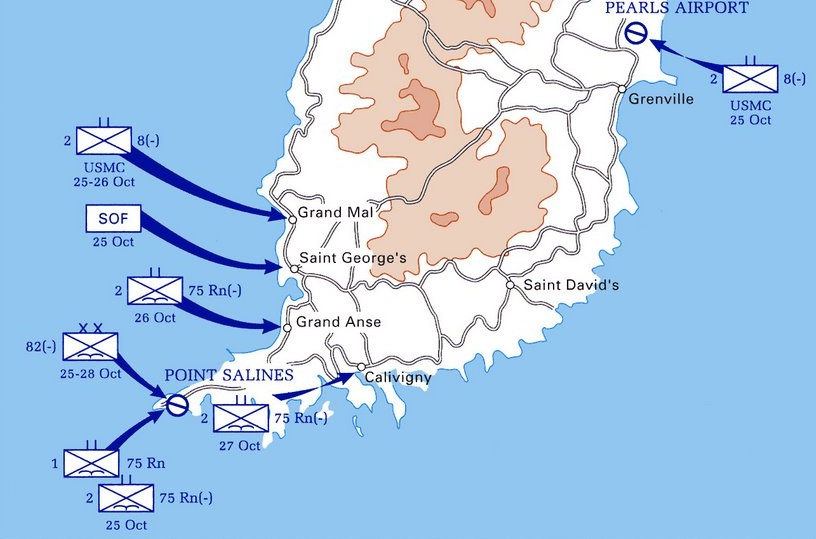
Troop invasion areas

General Trobaugh of the 82nd Airborne Division had two goals on the second day: securing the perimeter around Point Salines Airport, and rescuing American students held in Grand Anse. The Army lacked undamaged helicopters after the losses on the first day and consequently had to delay the student rescue until they made contact with Marine forces.

=== Morning ambushes ===
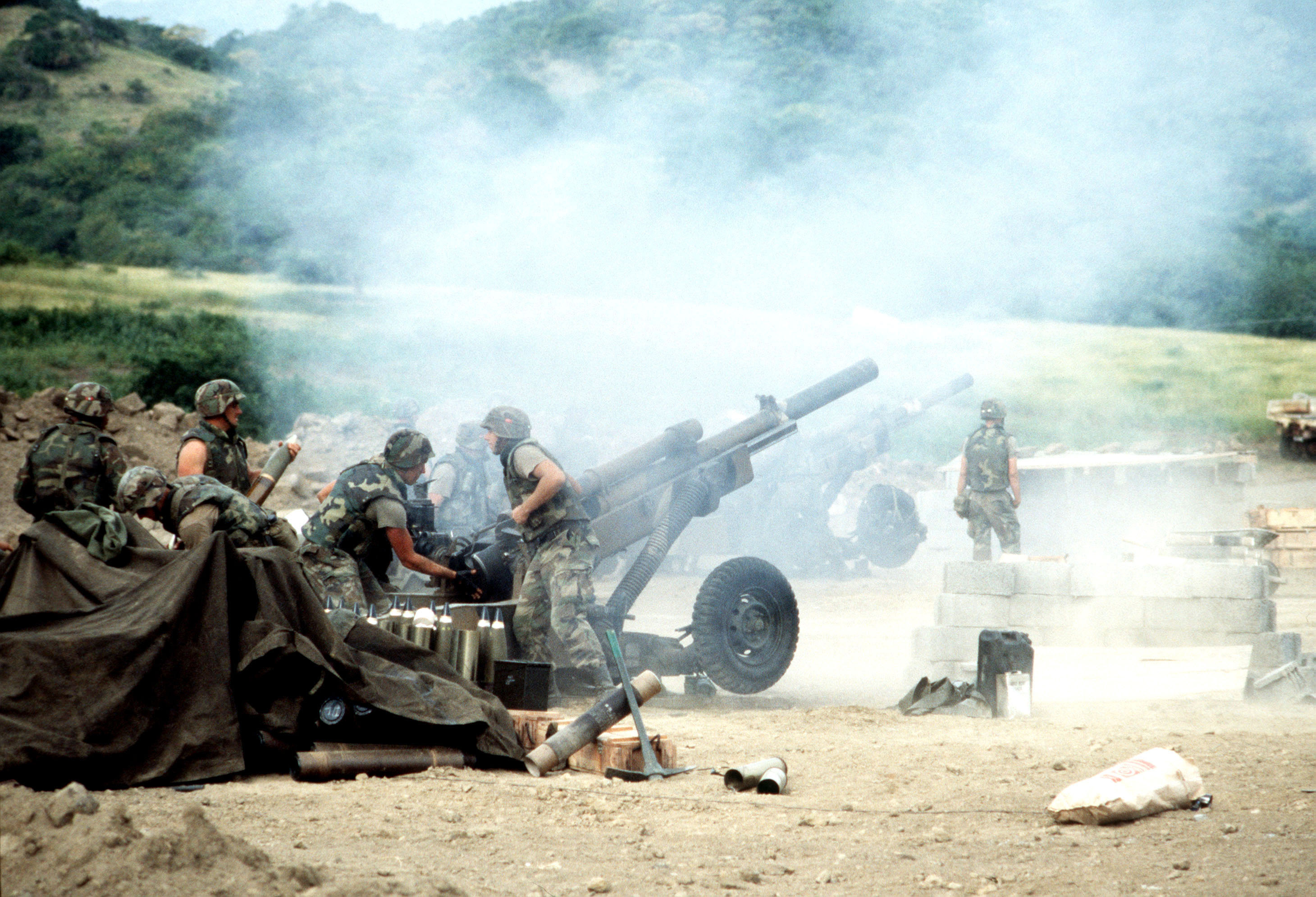
105mm howitzers of 1st Bn 320th FA, 82D Abn Div firing during battle

Early on the morning of 26 October, Cuban forces ambushed a patrol from the 2nd Battalion of the 325th Infantry Regiment near the village of Calliste. The American patrol suffered six wounded and two killed, including the commander of Company B, CPT Michael F. Ritz and squad leader SSG Gary L. Epps. Navy airstrikes and an artillery bombardment by 105mm howitzers targeting the main Cuban encampment eventually led to their surrender at 08:30. American forces pushed on to the village of Frequente, where they discovered a Cuban weapons cache reportedly sufficient to equip six battalions. Cuban forces ambushed a reconnaissance platoon mounted on gun-jeeps, but the jeeps returned fire, and a nearby infantry unit added mortar fire; the Cubans suffered four casualties with no American losses. Cuban resistance largely ended after these engagements.

=== Rescue at Grand Anse ===
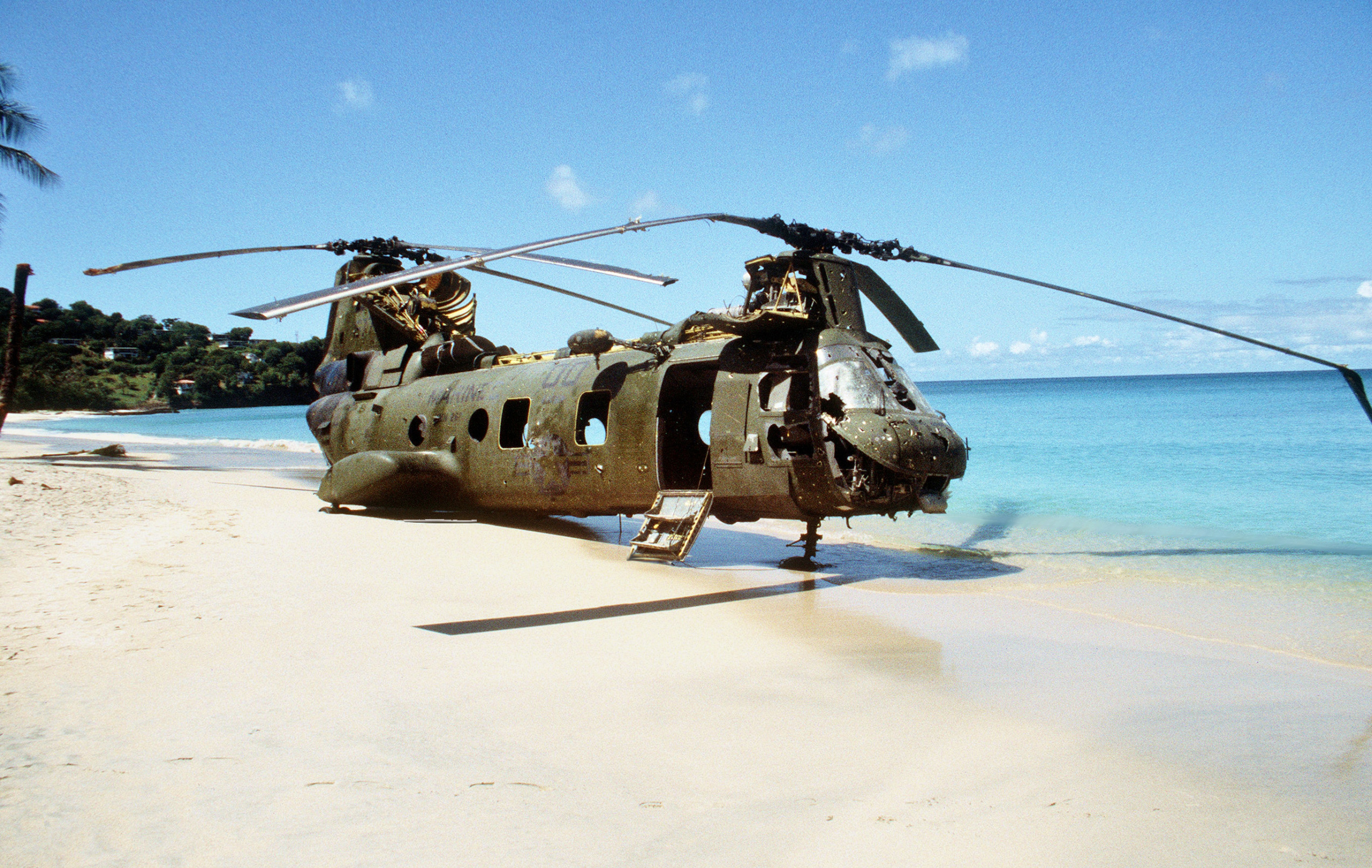
A Marine Corps Sea Knight helicopter sits on the beach after being disabled during the Grand Anse rescue on 26 October 1983.

On the afternoon of 26 October, Rangers of the 2nd Battalion of the 75th Ranger Regiment mounted Marine CH-46 Sea Knight helicopters to launch an air assault on the Grand Anse campus. The campus police offered light resistance before fleeing, wounding one Ranger, and one of the helicopters crashed on approach after its blade hit a palm tree. The Rangers evacuated the 233 American students by CH-53 Sea Stallion helicopters, but the students informed them that there was a third campus with Americans at Prickly Bay. A squad of 11 Rangers were accidentally left behind; they departed on a rubber raft which was picked up by USS Caron at 23:00.

== Third day of the invasion and after ==
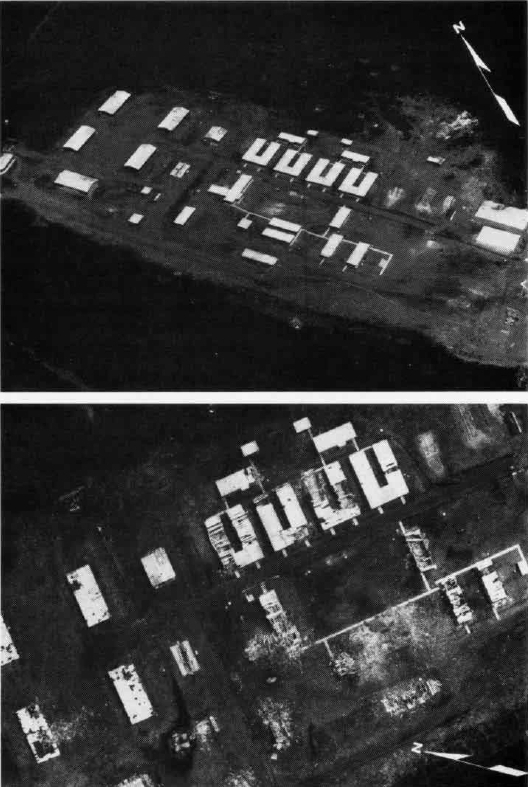
Calivigny barracks before and after being bombed

By 27 October, organized resistance was rapidly diminishing, but the American forces did not yet realize this. The 2nd Battalion, 8th Marines continued advancing along the coast and capturing additional towns, meeting little resistance, although one patrol did encounter a single BTR-60 during the night, dispatching it with a M72 LAW. The 325th Infantry Regiment advanced toward the capital of Saint George, capturing Grand Anse and discovering 200 American students whom they had missed the first day. They continued to the town of Ruth Howard and Saint George, meeting only scattered resistance. An ANGLICO unit called in an A-7 airstrike and accidentally hit the command post of the 2nd Brigade, wounding 17 troops, one of whom died.

The Army had reports that PRA forces were amassing at the Calivigny Barracks, only five kilometers from the Point Salines airfield. They organized an air assault by the 2nd Battalion of the 75th Ranger Regiment preceded by a preparatory bombardment by field howitzers (which mostly missed, their shells falling into the ocean), A-7s, AC-130s, and USS Caron. However, the Blackhawk helicopters began dropping off troops near the barracks but their approach was too fast. One of them crash landed and the two behind it collided with it, killing three and wounding four. The barracks were deserted.

In the following days, resistance ended entirely and the Army and Marines spread across the island, arresting PRA officials, seizing caches of weapons, and seeing to the repatriation of Cuban engineers. On 1 November, two companies from the 2/8 Marines made a combined sea and helicopter landing on the island of Carriacou 17 miles (27 km) northeast of Grenada. The 19 Grenadian soldiers defending the island surrendered without a fight. This was the last military action of the campaign. On 3 November, Reagan announced the ten-day American mission had been "successfully completed" and that many of the troops in the invasion force would be withdrawn in the following days.

== Outcome ==
It was stated Scoon had been in contact with Queen Elizabeth II ahead of the invasion; however, Queen Elizabeth's office denied knowledge of any request for military action and the Queen was "extremely upset" by the invasion of one of her realms. The only document signed by the Governor-General and asking for military assistance was dated after the invasion, which fueled speculation that the United States had used Scoon as an excuse for its incursion into Grenada.

Official U.S. sources state that some of the opponents were well-prepared and well-positioned and put up stubborn resistance, to the extent that the Americans called in two battalions of reinforcements on the evening of 26 October. The total naval and air superiority of the American forces had overwhelmed the defenders. Nearly 8,000 soldiers, sailors, airmen, and Marines had participated in Operation Urgent Fury, along with 353 Caribbean allies from the Caribbean Peace Forces. The final U.S. report claims 19 killed and 116 wounded; the Cubans to have had 25 killed, 59 wounded and 638 "combatants" captured; the Grenadians to have suffered 45 killed and 358 wounded. At least 24 civilians were also killed, 18 of whom died in the accidental bombing of a Grenadian mental hospital. The U.S. troops also destroyed a significant amount of Grenada's military hardware, including six BTR-60 APCs and a BRDM-2 armored car. A second BRDM-2 armored car was impounded and shipped back to Marine Corps Base Quantico for inspection.

== Legality of the invasion ==
The American government defended its invasion of Grenada as an action to protect American citizens living on the island, including medical students, and asserted it had been carried out at the request of the Governor-General. Deputy Secretary of State Kenneth W. Dam said that action was necessary to "resolve" what Article 28 of the charter of the Organization of American States (O.A.S.) refers to as "a situation that might endanger the peace". He added that the OAS charter and the UN charter both "recognize the competence of regional security bodies in ensuring regional peace and stability", referring to the decision by the Organisation of Eastern Caribbean States to approve the invasion.

The UN Charter prohibits the use of force by member states except in cases of self-defense or when specifically authorized by the UN Security Council. The UN Security Council had not authorized this invasion. Similarly, the United Nations General Assembly adopted General Assembly Resolution 38/7 by a vote of 108 to 9 with 27 abstentions, which "deeply deplores the armed intervention in Grenada, which constitutes a flagrant violation of international law". A similar resolution in the United Nations Security Council received widespread support but was vetoed by the United States.

== Reaction in the United States ==
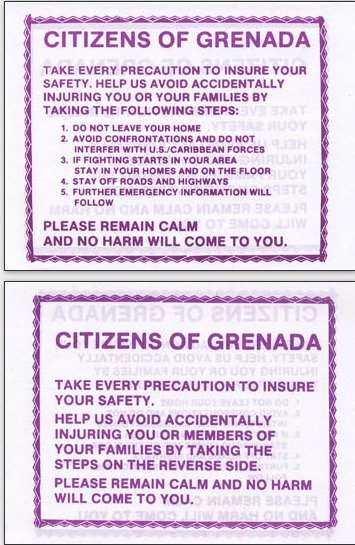
Leaflet distributed during the invasion by 9th PSYOP Battalion

Time magazine described the invasion as having "broad popular support". A congressional study group concluded that the invasion had been justified, as most members felt that American students at the university near a contested runway could have been taken hostage as American diplomats in Iran had been four years previously. The group's report caused House Speaker Tip O'Neill to change his position on the issue from opposition to support.

However, some members of the study group dissented from its findings. Congressman Louis Stokes (D-OH) stated: "Not a single American child nor single American national was in any way placed in danger or placed in a hostage situation prior to the invasion". The Congressional Black Caucus denounced the invasion, and seven Democratic congressmen introduced an unsuccessful resolution to impeach President Reagan, led by Ted Weiss (D-NY).

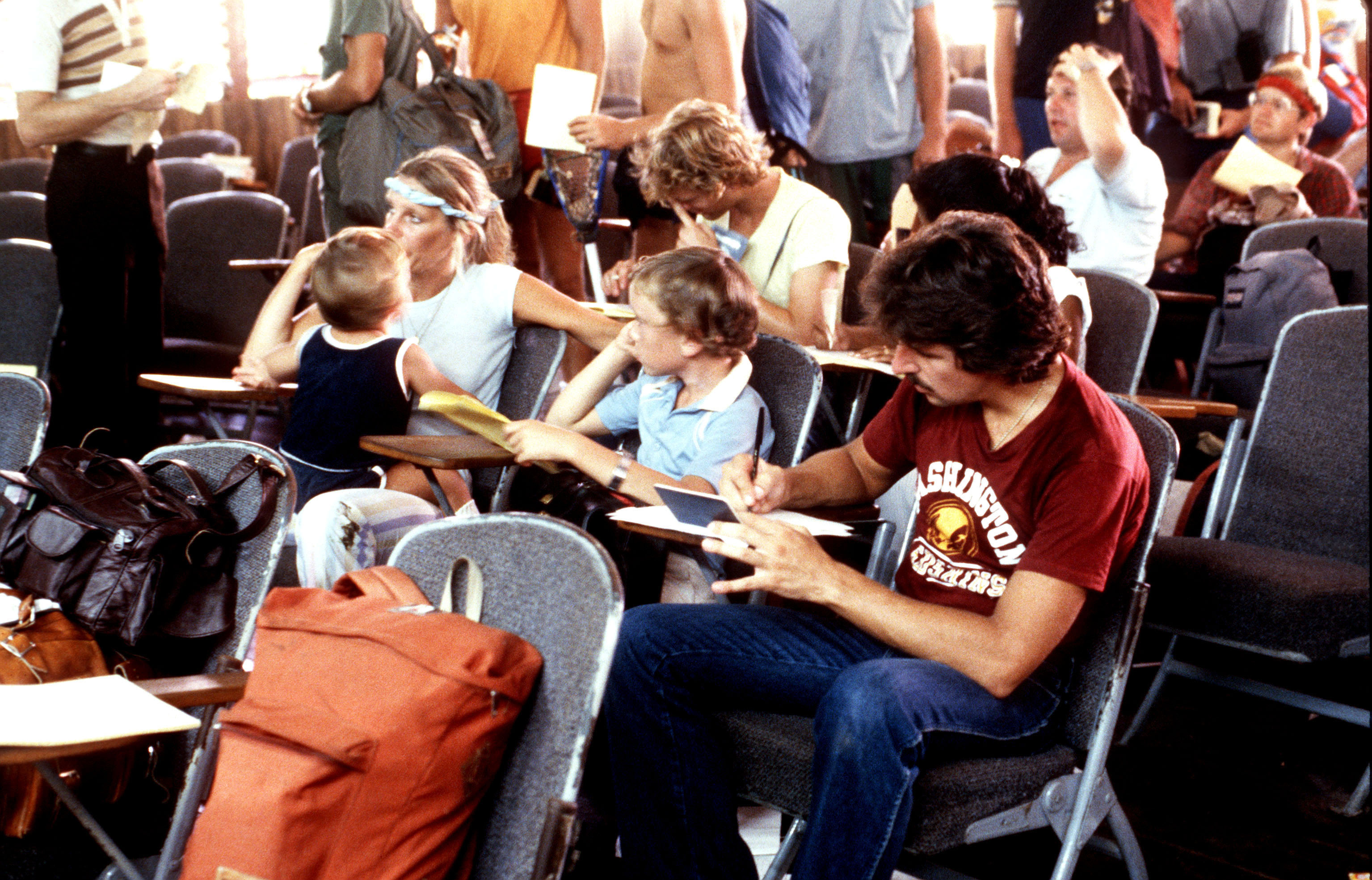
American students waiting to be evacuated from Grenada

Medical students in Grenada, speaking to Ted Koppel on the 25 October 1983 edition of his newscast Nightline, stated that they were safe and did not feel their lives were in peril. The next evening, medical students told Koppel how grateful they were for the Army Rangers and the invasion which probably saved their lives. State Department officials had assured the students they would be able to complete their medical school education in the United States.

An anti-war march attended by over 50,000 people, including Burlington, Vermont Mayor Bernie Sanders, was held in Washington, D.C. The march received support from presidential candidate Jesse Jackson.

== International reaction ==
The United Nations General Assembly adopted General Assembly Resolution 38/7 on 2 November 1983 by a vote of 108 to 9 which "deeply deplores the armed intervention in Grenada, which constitutes a flagrant violation of international law and of the independence, sovereignty and territorial integrity of that State". It went on to deplore "the death of innocent civilians" and the "killing of the Prime Minister and other prominent Grenadians", and it called for an "immediate cessation of the armed intervention" and demanded, "that free elections be organized".

This was the first overthrow of a Communist government by armed means since the end of World War II. The Soviet Union said that Grenada had been the object of United States threats, that the invasion violated international law, and that no small nation would find itself safe if the aggression were not rebuffed. The governments of some countries stated that the United States intervention was a return to the era of barbarism. The governments of other countries said the United States had violated several treaties and conventions to which it was a party. A similar resolution was discussed in the United Nations Security Council but it was ultimately vetoed by the United States.

President Ronald Reagan was asked if he was concerned by the lopsided 108–9 vote in the UN General Assembly. He said, "it didn't upset my breakfast at all". He called the operation a "rescue mission" and the troops involved "liberators"

Grenada is part of the Commonwealth of Nations and the intervention was opposed by several Commonwealth members including the United Kingdom, Trinidad and Tobago, and Canada. British Prime Minister Margaret Thatcher, a close ally of Reagan on other matters, personally opposed it. Reagan had forewarned her it might happen; she did not know for sure that it was coming until three hours before. Although she publicly supported the action, she sent the following message to Reagan at 12:30 on the morning of the invasion:

This action will be seen as intervention by a Western country in the internal affairs of a small independent nation, however unattractive its regime. I ask you to consider this in the context of our wider East/West relations and of the fact that we will be having in the next few days to present to our Parliament and people the siting of Cruise missiles in this country. I must ask you to think most carefully about these points. I cannot conceal that I am deeply disturbed by your latest communication. You asked for my advice. I have set it out and hope that even at this late stage you will take it into account before events are irrevocable. (the full text remains classified).

Her complaints were not heeded, and the invasion continued as planned. While the fighting was still going on, Reagan phoned Thatcher to apologize for any miscommunication between them, and their long-term friendly relationship endured.

== Aftermath and legacy ==
The American and Caribbean governments quickly reaffirmed Governor-General Sir Paul Scoon as Queen Elizabeth II's sole legitimate representative in Grenada, and hence the only lawful authority on the island. In accordance with Commonwealth constitutional practice, Scoon assumed power as interim head of government and formed an advisory council which named Nicholas Brathwaite as chairman, pending new elections. The New National Party won the elections in December 1984 and formed a government led by Prime Minister Herbert Blaize.

American forces remained in Grenada after combat operations finished in December as part of Operation Island Breeze. The remaining forces performed security missions and assisted members of the Caribbean Peacekeeping Force and the Royal Grenadian Police Force, including military police, special forces, and a specialized intelligence detachment.

In 1985, Queen Elizabeth II visited Grenada and personally presided over the State Opening of the Parliament of Grenada.

In 1986, seventeen political, military and civilian figures were convicted of crimes associated with the 19 October 1983 executions of Prime Minister Bishop and his supporters. The convicted group became known as the Grenada 17. In light of their lengthy imprisonment, Amnesty International referred to them as "the last of the Cold War prisoners".

=== United States ===
The invasion showed misalignment within the American "information apparatus", which Time magazine described as still being in "some disarray" three weeks after the invasion. For example, the State Department falsely claimed that a mass grave had been discovered which held 100 bodies of islanders who had been killed by communist forces. Major General Norman Schwarzkopf, deputy commander of the invasion force, said that 160 Grenadian soldiers and 71 Cubans had been killed during the invasion; the Pentagon had given a count of 59 Cuban and Grenadian deaths. Ronald H. Cole's report for the Joint Chiefs of Staff showed an even lower count.

Also of concern were the problems that the invasion exposed in military planning and operations. There was a lack of intelligence about Grenada which exacerbated the difficulties faced by the quickly assembled invasion force. For example, they did not know that the students were actually at two different campuses, and there was a 30-hour delay in reaching students at the second campus. Maps provided to soldiers on the ground (to report locations of units and request artillery and aircraft fire support) were tourist maps on which military grid reference lines were drawn by hand. These maps did not show topography and were not marked with crucial positions. Communications between services were not compatible and hindered the coordination of operations. Maps given to some members of the invasion force had their landing strips drawn by hand.

Reagan attempted to use the invasion of Grenada to end Vietnam Syndrome, a term used in reference to the American public's aversion to overseas conflicts that resulted from the Vietnam War. After the invasion, on 13 December 1983, Reagan asserted that "our days of weakness are over. Our military forces are back on their feet and standing tall."

=== Goldwater–Nichols Act ===
The Department of Defense recognized a need for improved communications and coordination among the branches of the U.S. military. Congress investigated many of the problems and passed the Goldwater–Nichols Act of 1986 (Pub. L.99–433). This act reworked the command structure of the military, making the most sweeping changes to the Department of Defense since the department was established in the National Security Act of 1947. It increased the power of the Chairman of the Joint Chiefs of Staff and advanced the concept of unified joint forces organized under one command.

=== Other ===
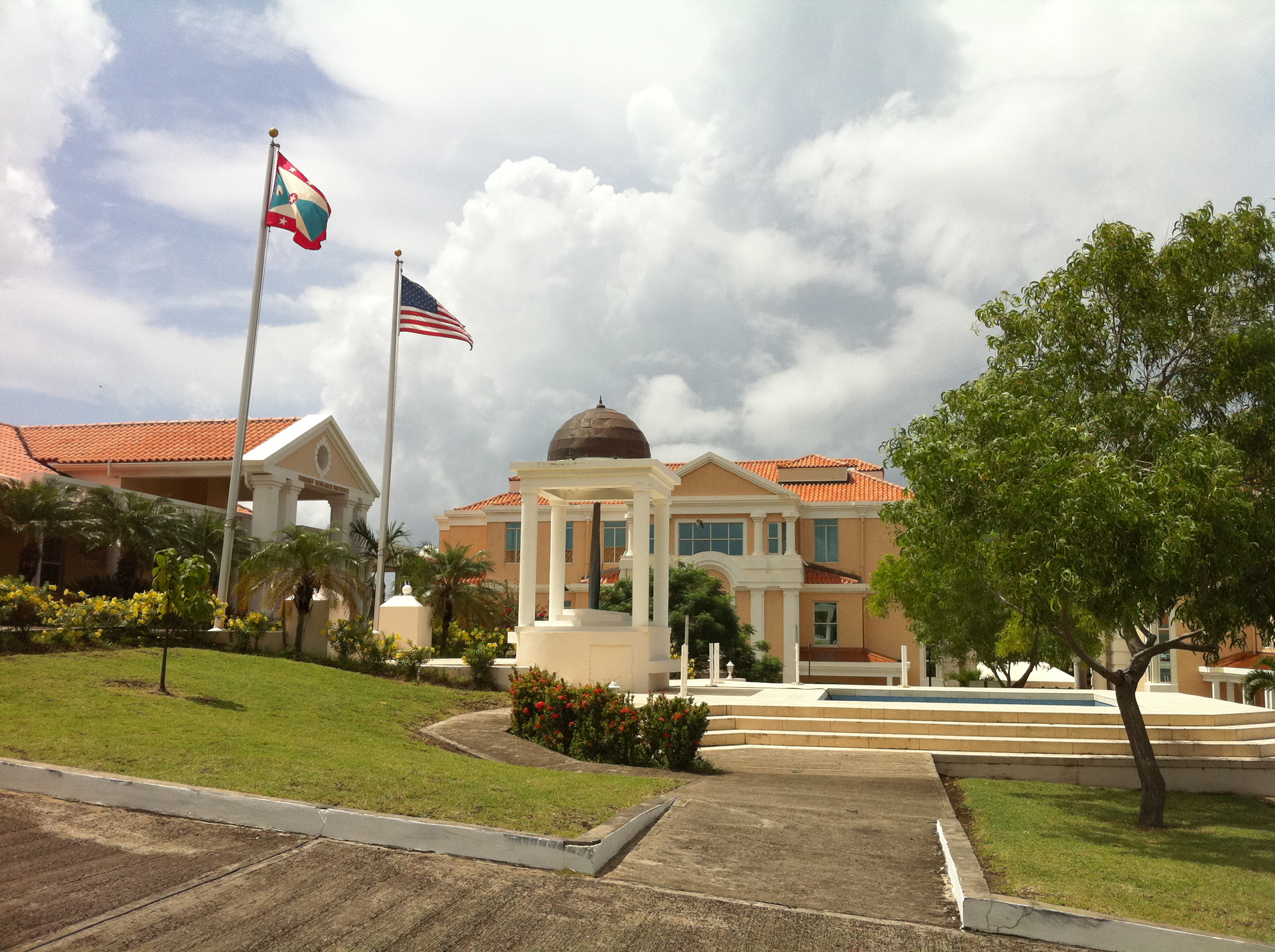
SGU Campus Memorial

A CBS News poll that surveyed 304 people showed that 91% of Grenadians welcomed the invasion, and that 85% of Grenadians felt that their lives were in danger while Hudson Austin was in power.

25 October is a national holiday in Grenada, called Thanksgiving Day, to commemorate the invasion. St. George's University (SGU) built a monument on its True Blue campus to honor the American servicemen killed during the invasion, and marks the day with an annual memorial ceremony.

After the Grenada invasion, Cuba became increasingly concerned the U.S. might also invade socialist Nicaragua where Cuba had supplied primary school teachers to help the country establish rural schools. As a consequence of the invasion, Cuba removed its female primary school teachers from Nicaragua.

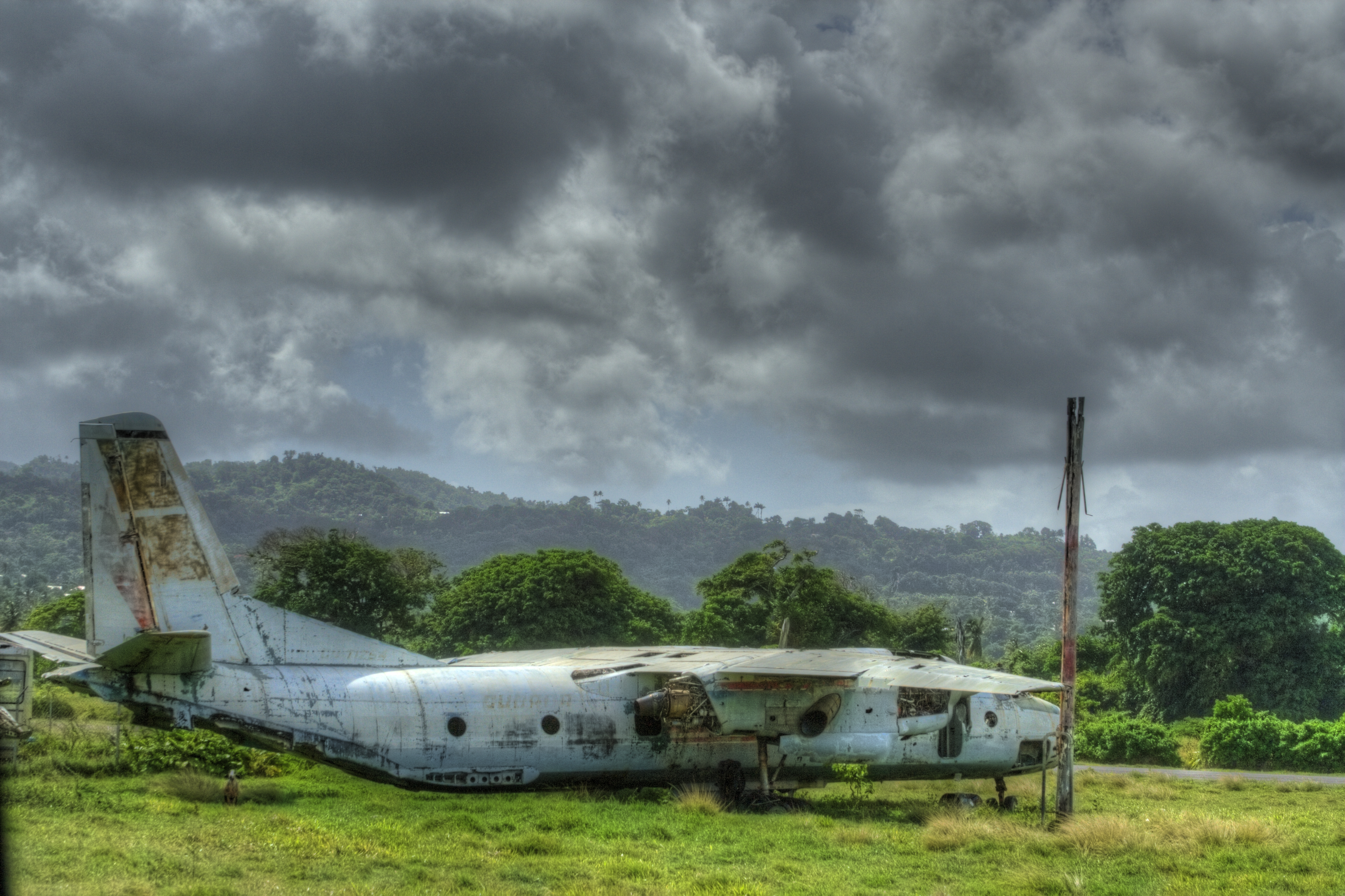
Derelict Cuban Antonov An-26 airliner at Pearls Airport in 2007

On 29 May 2009, the Grenadian government changed the name of Point Salines International Airport to Maurice Bishop International Airport. Hundreds of Grenadians turned out for the occasion to honor Bishop's memory. Prime Minister Tillman Thomas gave the keynote speech and referred to the airport renaming as an act of the Grenadian people coming home to themselves. He also hoped it would bring closure to a chapter of denial in Grenada's history.

== Order of battle ==
Operation Urgent Fury

Vice Admiral Joseph Metcalf, III, COMSECONDFLT, became Commander of Joint Task Force 120 (CJTF 120) and commanded units from the Air Force, Army, Navy, Marine Corps, and Coast Guard from the MARG flagship USS Guam. Rear Admiral Richard C. Berry (COMCRUDESGRU Eight) (Commander Task Group 20) supported the task force on the aircraft carrier USS Independence. Commanding Officer USS Guam (Task Force 124) was assigned the mission of seizing Pearls Airport and the port of Grenville, and of neutralizing any opposing forces in the area. Simultaneously, Army Rangers in Task Force 123 would secure points at the southern end of the island, including the airfield under construction near Point Salines. The 82d Airborne Division (Task Force 121) were designated to follow and assume the security at Point Salines once it was seized by Task Force 123. Task Group 20.5, a carrier battle group built around USS Independence, and Air Force elements would support the ground forces.

=== Ground forces ===
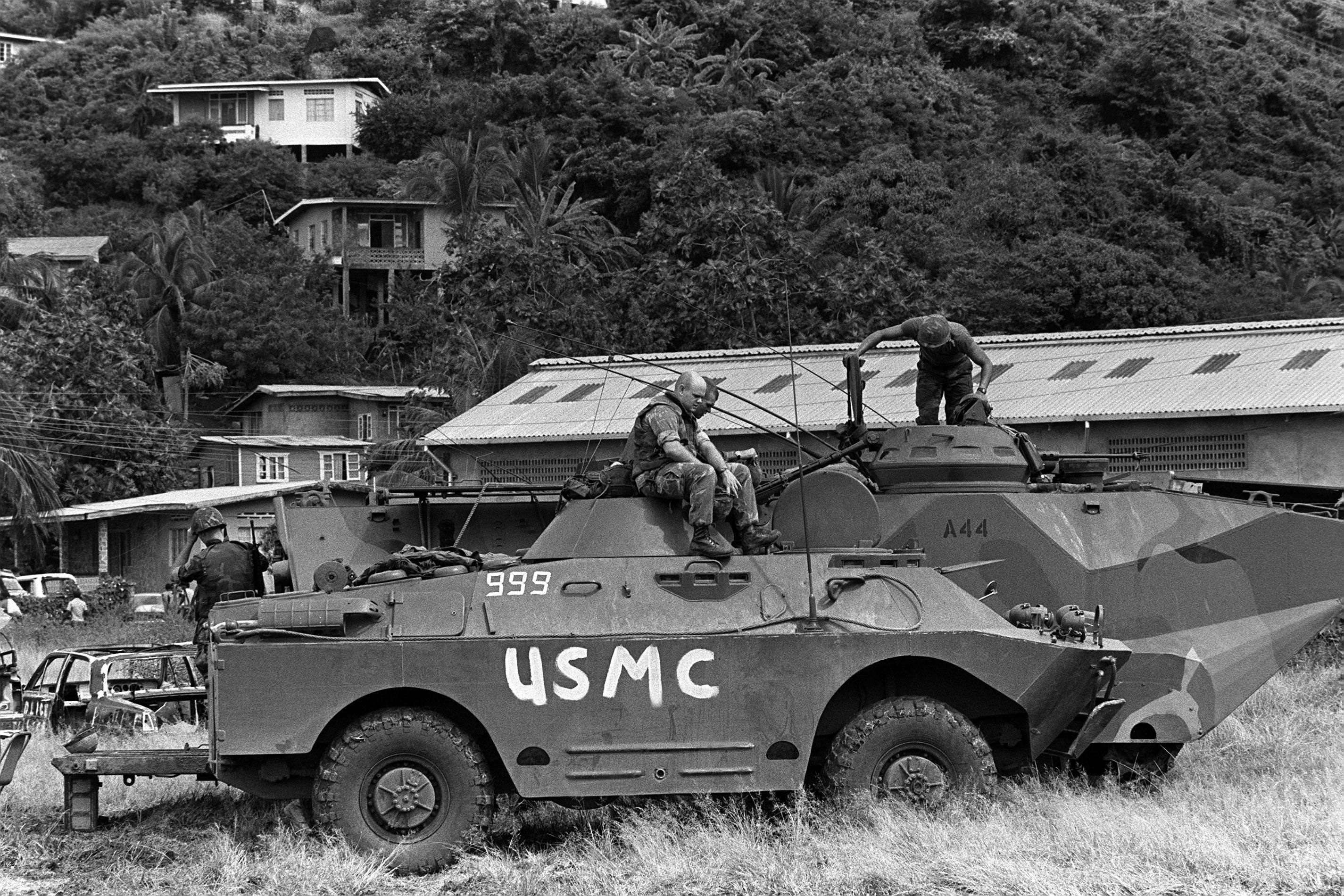
U.S. Marines sit atop a captured Grenadian BRDM-2 during the invasion.

- 1st and 2nd Ranger Battalions 75th Ranger Regiment conducted a low-level parachute assault to secure Point Salines Airport. Hunter Army Airfield, Georgia and Ft. Lewis, Washington.
- 82nd Airborne Division – 2nd Brigade Task Force (325th Airborne Infantry Regiment 2nd and 3rd Battalions plus supporting units) and 3rd Brigade Task Force (1st and 2nd Battalions of the 505th Parachute Infantry Regiment, 1st and 2nd Battalions of the 508th Parachute Infantry Regiment, plus supporting units), A Company, 2nd Battalion 504th Parachute Infantry Regiment, 82nd MP General Support Platoon HHC, 313th Military Intelligence Battalion (CEWI). Fort Bragg, North Carolina, 1st Battalion of the 319th Field Artillery. 1st Battalion of the 320th Field Artillery.
- 22nd Marine Amphibious Unit Camp Lejeune, North Carolina
- 27th Engineer Battalion of the 20th Engineer Brigade (Airborne), Fort Bragg, North Carolina
- 548th Engineer Battalion, Ft Bragg, North Carolina
- 160th Aviation Battalion, Ft. Campbell, Kentucky
- 18th Aviation Company, 269th Aviation Battalion Ft. Bragg, North Carolina
- 1st and 2nd 82nd Combat Aviation Battalion, Fort Bragg, North Carolina
- 1 SQN 17 Air Cavalry Airborne, Fort Bragg, North Carolina
- 65th MP Company (Airborne), 118th MP Company (Airborne), and HHD, 503rd MP Battalion (Airborne) of the 16th Military Police Brigade (Airborne), XVIII Airborne Corps, Fort Bragg, North Carolina
- 411th MP Company of the 89th Military Police Brigade, III Corps, Ft. Hood, Texas
- 35th Signal Brigade, Ft. Bragg, North Carolina
- 50th Signal Battalion, 35th Signal Brigade, Ft. Bragg, North Carolina
- 203rd Military Intelligence Battalion, Aberdeen Proving Ground, Maryland
- 319th Military Intelligence Battalion and 519th Military Intelligence Battalion, 525th Military Intelligence Brigade, Fort Bragg, North Carolina
- 1st Psychological Operations Battalion (Airborne) of the 4th Psychological Operations Group (Airborne) – provided tactical loudspeaker support, radio station broadcasts, and dissemination of informational pamphlets. Fort Bragg, North Carolina.
- 1st Corps Support Command COSCOM, 7th Trans Battalion, 546th LMT Fort Bragg, North Carolina
- 44th Medical Brigade – Personnel from the 44th Medical Brigade and operational units including the 5th MASH were deployed. Fort Bragg, North Carolina.
- 82nd Finance Company MPT
- US Navy SEAL Team 4 Little Creek, Virginia and US Navy SEAL Team 6 Virginia Beach, Virginia
- Air Force Detachment 1, 507th Tactical Air Control Wing (Fort Bragg, North Carolina) – jump qualified TACPs who were attached to and deployed with the 82d Airborne, Fort Bragg, North Carolina (now the 14th ASOS, part of the 18th Air Support Operations Group)
- 21st Tactical Air Support Squadron (Shaw AFB, SC). Jump qualified FACs who were attached to and deployed with Detachment 1, 507th Tactical Air Control Wing and the 82d Airborne, Fort Bragg, North Carolina.
- 5th Weather Squadron, 5th Weather Wing (MAC) Fort Bragg, North Carolina. Jump qualified combat weathermen who are attached and deployed with the 82nd, now in AFSOC.
- Det 1 MACOS Combat Controllers
- 1st Special Forces Operational Detachment–Delta

=== Air Force ===
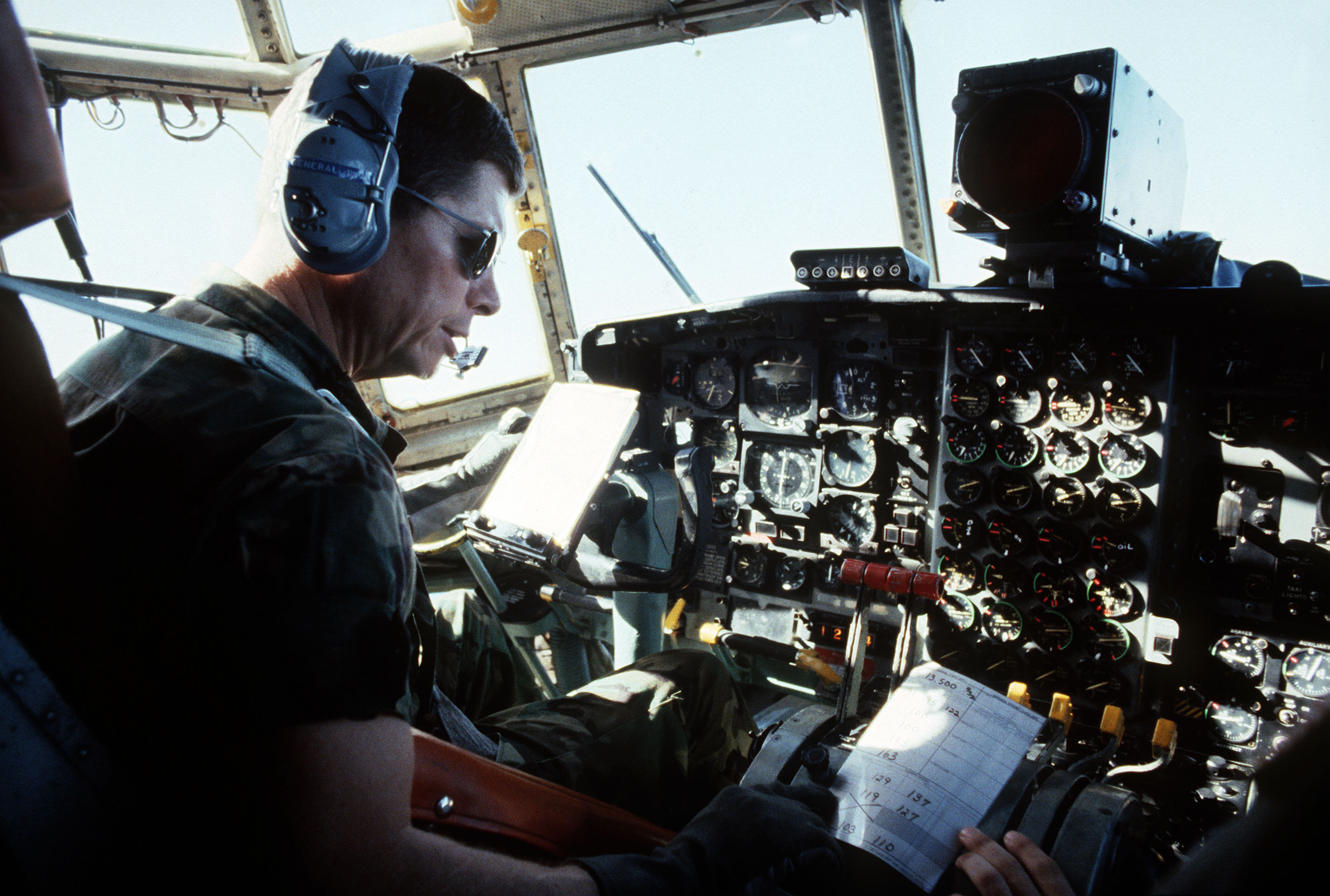
Commander-in-Chief of The Military Airlift Command General Thomas M. Ryan Jr., piloting a U.S. Air Force Lockheed C-130 Hercules aircraft en route from Barbados to Grenada, November 1983

- 136th Tactical Airlift Wing, Texas Air National Guard – provided C-130 Hercules combat airlift support, cargo, and supplies
- Various Air National Guard tactical fighter wings and squadrons – provided A-7D Corsair II ground-attack aircraft for close air support
- 23rd Tactical Fighter Wing – provided close air support for allied forces with A-10 Warthogs. This group was later reassigned as 21st Tactical Air Wing, and officially then recognized support from the Pararescue personnel in their ranks, present also; but not officially recognized in their contributions in this theatre. They too, were subsequently redesignated as "Para-Jumpers" or PJs in later years and remain so to this day.
- 26th Air Defense Squadron NORAD – provided air support for allied forces with F-15 Eagles
- 33rd Tactical Fighter Wing – provided air superiority cover for allied forces with F-15 Eagles
- 437th Military Airlift Wing – provided airlift support with C-141 Starlifters
- 1st Special Operations Wing – flew AC-130H Spectre gunships and MC-130E Combat Talons
- 317th Military Airlift Wing – provided airlift support with C-130 Hercules from Pope AFB/Fort Bragg, North Carolina complex to Grenada
- 63d Military Airlift Wing – provided airlift support with C-141 Starlifter aircraft in the air landing of Airborne troops, 63rd Security Police Squadron provided airfield security support – (Norton AFB, California)
- 443rd Military Airlift Wing, 443rd Security Police Squadron (Altus AFB, Oklahoma) – provided a 44-man Airbase Ground Defense flight (October–November 1983)
- 19th Air Refueling Wing – provided aerial refueling support for all other aircraft
- 507th Tactical Air Control Wing (elements of the 21st TASS at Shaw AFB, SC and Detachment 1, Fort Bragg, North Carolina) – provided Tactical Air Control Parties (TACPs) in support of the 82nd Airborne Division
- 552nd Air Control Wing – providing air control support with E-3 Sentry AWACS aircraft
- 62nd Security Police Group (Provisional) Multi Squadron Law Enforcement & Security Forces – prisoner detaining and transport attached to 82nd Airborne
- 60th Military Airlift Wing's 60th Security Police Squadron (Travis AFB, California) – provided airfield security in Grenada as well as Barbados. 602nd OMS provided aircraft recovery teams for cargo operations.

=== Navy ===
Two formations of U.S. warships took part in the invasion. USS Independence carrier battle group; and Marine Amphibious Readiness Group, flagship USS Guam, USS Barnstable County, USS Manitowoc, USS Fort Snelling, and USS Trenton. Carrier Group Four was allocated the designation Task Group 20.5 for the operation.

Independence carrier battle group
Surface warships	Carrier Air Wing Six (CVW-6) squadrons embarked aboard flagship Independence	
USS Independence	Fighter Squadron 14 (VF-14): 13 F-14A	Carrier Airborne Early Warning Squadron 122 (VAW-122): 4 E-2C
USS Coontz	Fighter Squadron 32 (VF-32): 14 F-14A	Electronic Attack Squadron 131 (VAQ-131): 4 EA-6B
USS Moosbrugger	Attack Squadron 176 (VA-176): 16 A-6E/KA-6D	Helicopter Antisubmarine Squadron (15 HS-15): 6 SH-3H
USS Caron	Attack Squadron 87 (VA-87): 12 A-7E	Sea Control Squadron 28 (VS-28): 10 S-3A
USS Clifton Sprague	Attack Squadron 15 (VA-15): 12 A-7E	COD: 1 C-1A
USS Suribachi	----	----

In addition, the following ships supported naval operations: USS Kidd, USS Aquila, USS Aubrey Fitch, USS Briscoe, USS Nicholson, USS Portsmouth, USS Recovery, USS Saipan, USS Sampson, USS Samuel Eliot Morison, USS John L. Hall, USS Silversides, USS Taurus, USNS Neosho, USS Caloosahatchee, USS Richmond K. Turner, USS Trenton, and USS Edson.

=== Coast Guard ===
- USCGC Chase
- Law Enforcement Detachments
- HC-130 aircraft

== See also ==
- United States involvement in regime change
- Foreign interventions by the United States
- Heartbreak Ridge, a 1986 film which depicts the invasion
- List of United States invasions of Latin American countries
- 1979 Union Island Uprising, a small revolt partially inspired by the Grenadian Revolution

== Primary sources ==
- Grenada Documents, an Overview & Selection, DOD & State Dept, Sept 1984, 813 pages.
- Grenada, A Preliminary Report, DOD & State
- Joint Overview, Operation Urgent Fury, 1 May 1985, 87 pages
