= 1983 Grenada mental hospital bombing =

Bombing during US invasion of Grenada

- Part of the United States invasion of Grenada
- A nurse stands in front of the ruins of the hospital after the bombing
- Location: Richmond Hill Mental Hospital, St. George's, Grenada
- Date: 25 October 1983
- Deaths: 18
- Injuries: 30
- Perpetrator: United States Navy

On 25 October 1983, during the invasion of Grenada, the Richmond Hill Mental Hospital was bombed by U.S. Navy A-7 Corsairs, killing 18 people and hospitalizing 30 more.

== Background ==
Grenada gained independence from the United Kingdom in 1974 under Sir Eric Gairy. He claimed victory in the general election of 1976, but the opposition did not accept the claim. On 13 March 1979, the New Jewel Movement led an armed revolution and overthrew Gairy's government while he was out of the country, establishing the People's Revolutionary Government under Maurice Bishop.

On 25 October 1983, under codename Operation Urgent Fury, the United States and the Regional Security System invaded Grenada at the request of Tom Adams, the Prime Minister of Barbados and the Prime Minister of Dominica, Eugenia Charles.

== Bombing ==
On the first day of Operation Urgent Fury, A-7 Corsairs from the USS Independence (CV-62) attacked enemy command posts at the Fort Frederick and Fort Rupert areas. The Corsairs lacked any maps or ground indication of their target, which caused them to mistakenly bomb the Richmond Hill Mental Hospital, a 183-patient mental hospital near the forts. The bombing killed 18 people, 17 of them being patients and 1 being a hospital staff member. 30 more people were hospitalized and another 68 patients were unaccounted for, but later returned to the hospital or remained at their homes. The hospital was destroyed by the explosions. Early reports of the attack stated that as many as 50 people were killed.

The bombing was the subject of a 1984 painting by the British artist Sue Coe, titled "U.S. Military Successfully Bombs A Mental Hospital in Grenada".
