= Joseph Metcalf III =

United States admiral

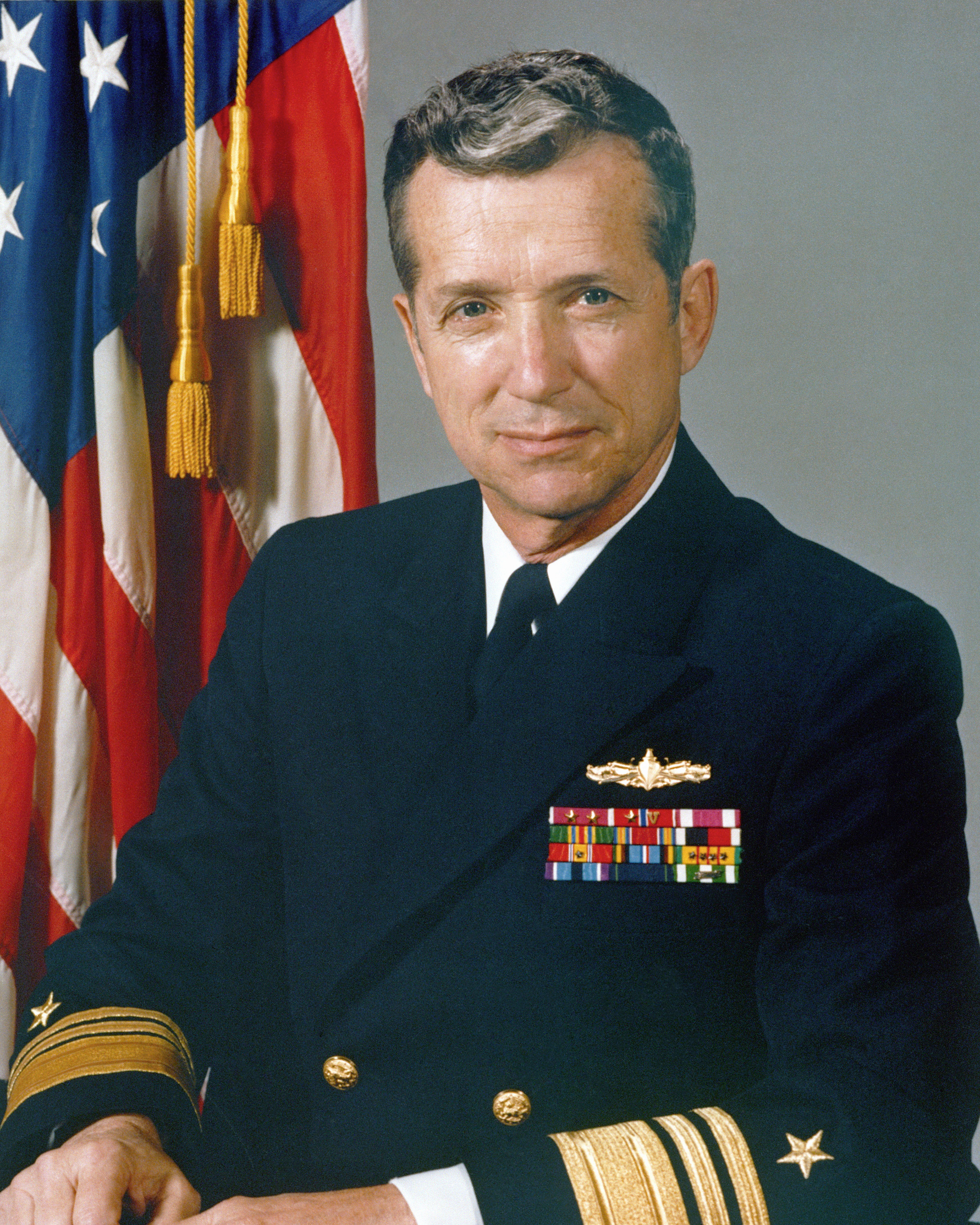
- Vice Admiral Metcalf in 1986
- Born: December 20, 1927; Holyoke, Massachusetts, U.S.
- Died: March 2, 2007 (aged 79); Washington, D.C., U.S.
- Military career
- Allegiance: United States
- Branch: United States Navy
- Service years: 1946–1987
- Rank: Vice admiral
- Conflicts: Vietnam War; Invasion of Grenada
- Awards: Legion of Merit; Bronze Star Medal; Meritorious Service Medal

Joseph Metcalf III (December 20, 1927 – March 2, 2007) was a United States Navy vice admiral. He graduated from Vermont Academy in 1946 and then from the Naval Academy in 1951 and retired from active duty in 1987.

== Experience ==
Vice Admiral Metcalf had extensive leadership and operational experience in both sea and shore assignments. He held sea commands in each grade, lieutenant through vice admiral. Among his early commands was the USS King County, which fired the Regulus II, the forerunner of the present-day cruise missiles. He commanded the USS Westchester County, which made the first combat landing in Vietnam. He was in command of all the surface ships during the final evacuation of U.S. forces from Vietnam. Other sea commands were commanding officer of the USS Bradley, commander of Destroyer Squadron 33, commander of Naval Surface Group Mid – Pacific, commander of Destroyer Group Eight and Battle Group Two and commander of Second Fleet / commander of NATO Strike Fleet Atlantic / Commander Joint Task Force 120.

He was the operational commander of all U.S. Forces during the successful campaign to rescue U.S. citizens in the invasion of Grenada.

Metcalf's last active duty assignment was the deputy chief of staff of naval operations for surface warfare. During this assignment he developed the concept of "revolution at sea" and the triad "up out and down" for missile deterrence.

Other assignments ashore included instructor at the U.S. Naval Academy and the Office of the Secretary of Defense at the Advanced Research and Development Center in Bangkok, Thailand. In the office of the Chief of Naval Operations, he served in a number of positions: head of the planning branch of the Programming Division, deputy assistant chief of naval personnel for personnel planning and programming and as director of the General Planning and Programming Division.

== Memberships ==
Metcalf was a member of numerous boards: The Navy Federal Credit Union, the United States Naval Academy Foundation, and the board of directors of the Navy Mutual Aid Association. He was also a member of the board of directors of the USS Constitution Museum. He was the district chairman of the Potomac Division of National Academy of Sciences Board. He was also a member of vestry of St. Patrick's Episcopal Church in NW Washington, D.C.

== Awards ==
Metcalf wore the Distinguished Service Medal with two gold stars, Bronze Star Medal with Combat V and gold star, the Combat Action Ribbon, the Meritorious Service Medal and Meritorious Unit Commendation. Metcalf is a graduate of the U.S. Naval Postgraduate School, Operations Analysis Curriculum and the U.S. Army War College.

== War souvenir controversy ==
At the conclusion of active combat operations following the Invasion of Grenada, Metcalf and several of his senior aides were caught attempting to bring captured Soviet-made AK-47s back to the US as war souvenirs, in violation of both military regulations and US customs law. Twenty-four AK-47s, along with 24 magazines, were seized by customs agents from the Vice Admiral's plane at Norfolk Naval Air Station, VA when Metcalf and his officers were returning from the Grenada theater.

As a direct result of intervention by President Ronald Reagan, Metcalf received only a caution from the Navy regarding the incident, and it did not prevent him from later being assigned as deputy chief of staff of naval operations for surface warfare. Press accounts at the time noted that in the same conflict, six enlisted personnel and one junior officer, of which two were Marines and five were Soldiers from the 82nd Airborne Division, all received reduction in rank, dishonorable discharges and at least one year of prison time for the same offense.
