= Ameripol =

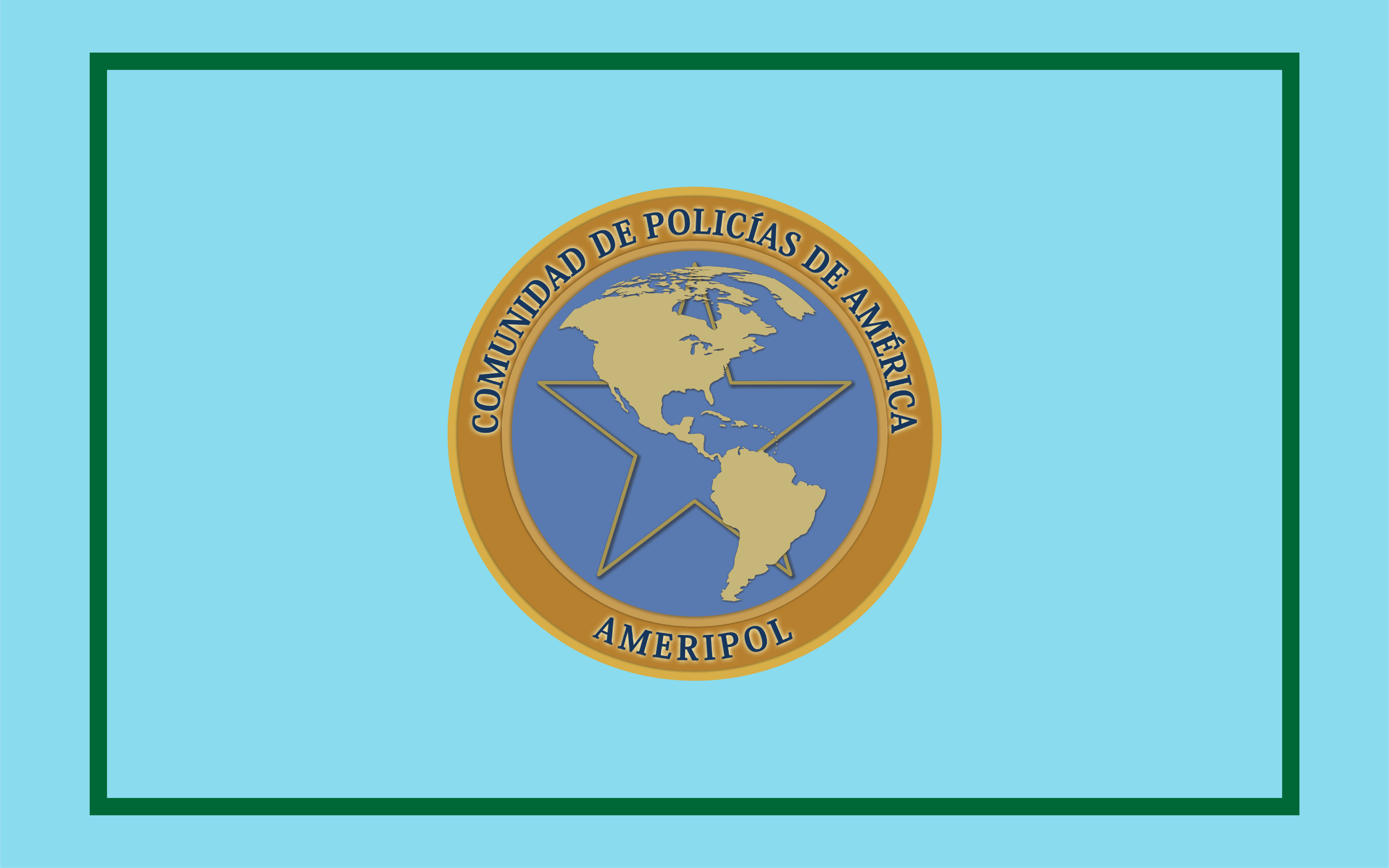

The Police Community of the Americas or Ameripol (Spanish: Comunidad de Policías de América) is a hemispheric mechanism of cooperation police organization created in 2007.

Representatives of 18 countries formalized the creation of Ameripol on 14 November 2007 in Bogotá, Colombia.

== Member police forces ==
- Fuerza de Policía Real de Antigua y Barbuda
- Argentine National Gendarmerie
- Departamento de Policía de Belice
- Policía Boliviana
- Departamento de Polícia Federal
- Carabineros de Chile
- National Police of Colombia
- Fuerza Pública de Costa Rica
- Organismo de Investigación Judicial
- Policía Nacional Revolucionaria de Cuba
- Policía Nacional de Ecuador
- National Civil Police of El Salvador
- Drug Enforcement Administration
- Policía de Puerto Rico
- Policía Nacional Civil de Guatemala
- Fuerza de Policía de Guiana
- Haitian National Police
- Policía Nacional de Honduras
- Fuerza Constabularia de Jamaica
- Federal Police (Mexico)
- National Police of Nicaragua
- Policía Nacional de Panamá
- Panamanian Public Forces
- Policía Nacional del Paraguay
- National Police of Peru
- Policía Nacional de República Dominicana
- Fuerza de Policía Real de San Cristóbal y Nieves
- Fuerza de Policía Real de Santa Lucia
- Policía Nacional de Uruguay
- Servicio de Policía de Trinidad y Tobago

== Observer agencies ==
- BKA (Oficina Federal de Investigación Criminal de Alemania)
- Royal Canadian Mounted Police
- CLACIP (Comunidad Latinoamérica y del Caribe de Inteligencia Policial
- (Comisión de Jefes/as, Directores/as de Policía de Centroamérica, México, el Caribe y Colombia)
- National Police Corps of Spain
- Civil Guard (Spain)
- Europol (Oficina de Policía de Europa)
- Guardia di Finanza
- International Association of Chiefs of Police
- Carabinieri
- Dirección Central del Servicio Antidrogas de Italia
- Organization of American States
- Interpol
- RSS
- Ministry of the Interior of France
- Cuerpo de Servicios Policiales de Holanda
- Policía Nacional de Suecia
- Polícia de Segurança Pública
- Center for Research and National Security
- Policía Principat d'Andorra

== Executive Secretaries and presidents ==
Executive Secretaries:

- Delegate Andrei Passos Rodrigues

President:

- General William René Salamanca Ramírez

== See also ==
- Europol, a similar Europe-wide organization.
- Afripol, a similar African-wide organization.
- Interpol
- United Nations Office on Drugs and Crime
- United Nations Commission on Narcotic Drugs
