= Pearls Airport =

- IATA: none; ICAO: TGPG

Summary
- Airport type: Public
- Operator: Grenada Airports Authority
- Location: Grenville, Grenada
- Coordinates: 12°08′37″N 061°37′00″W

Map
- Location in Grenada

Runways
Direction	Length		Surface
Direction	m	ft	Surface
n/a	1,570	5,151	n/a

Pearls Airport (ICAO: TGPG) was an airport in Grenada in the Caribbean, located at the northeastern corner of the island, 31 kilometres (19 mi) northeast of the main town and capital St George's (12 degrees 09 minutes North, 61 degrees 37 minutes West) with a runway set at a direction 082 degrees/262 degrees and 1,570 metres (5,151 ft) long.

It was the country's first airport, opened in 1943 and was under the management of the Grenada Airports Authority. Pan American Airways did not operate in the Windward Islands, because of an excluding agreement made by the British Government to protect British West Indian Airways. This meant the airport was not in daily operation.

Pearls was used by the Allies for military aircraft during World War II. After the war, the airport reverted to civilian operation and the runway was extended and paved to its final length. The airport's principal commercial carrier was Leeward Islands Air Transport (LIAT), which linked Grenada to nearby islands with its 48-passenger turboprop aircraft. The airport's surrounding hills and its distance from the capital city of St George's made it unsuitable for further improvements.

On 25 October 1983, Marines from the 8th Marine Regiment landed nearby by helicopter and "captured" Pearls Airport during the United States invasion of Grenada, meeting only light resistance. The airport then consisted of a cinder block terminal/operations building and a fuel storage facility. The Marines seized two parked aircraft. One was an AN-26 (CU-T1254) Cubana Airlines turboprop which had arrived the day before from Havana with two high-level Cuban officials. The other was an AN-2R (CCCP-71189) biplane, a gift to Grenada from the Soviet Union, ostensibly for agricultural spray. During the ensuing period of hostilities, the Marines used the airfield as a base for offensive operations to complete subjugation of the eastern side of the island. The principal American base was at Point Salines, where a 2,700-metre (9,000 ft) runway and new terminal was nearing completion.

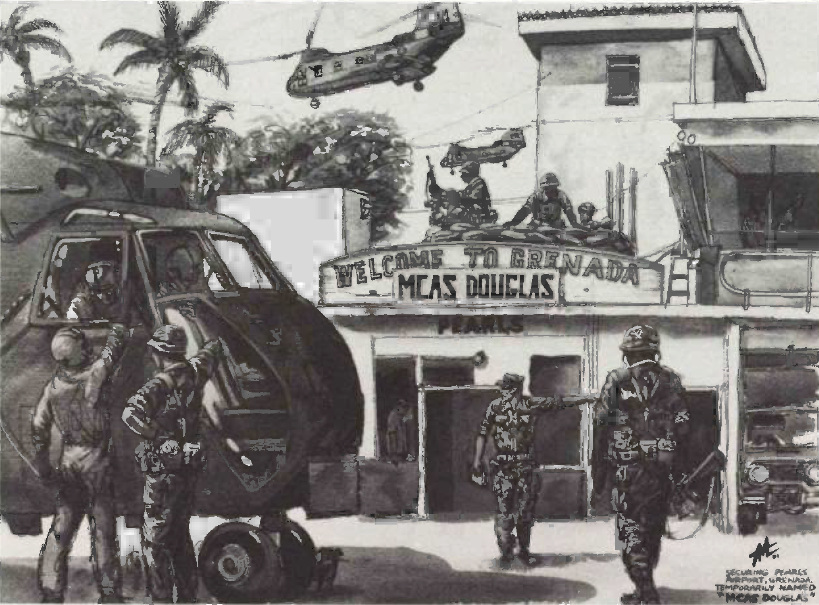
Pearls Airport, captured by Marines during the invasion of Grenada and temporarily renamed Marine Corps Air Station (MCAS) Douglas

In 1984, Pearls was replaced as Grenada's main airport by the Point Salines International Airport, now called Maurice Bishop International Airport. Pearls is now a construction site and used as a drag racing strip. Both wrecks of the AN-26 and AN-2R sit by the former terminal as of 2006.
