= Dodds Prison =

Prison in Saint Philip, Barbados

- Interactive map of Dodds Prison
- Location: Dodds, St. Philip, Barbados; 13.1420°N 59.4813°W
- Capacity: 1150
- Population: 874
- Opened: 15 October 2007
- Warden: Lt. Col. John A. Nurse, Superintendent
- Website: https://www.gov.bb/government-main/departments/prison-department/

Dodds Prison, previously called Her Majesty's Prison Dodds until the dissolution of the Barbadian Crown, is a prison in Barbados at Dodds, St. Philip. It was built as a replacement for HM Glendairy Prison, which has been permanently decommissioned.

In 2015 it was reported that the prison's medical unit did not have its own ambulance or full-time medical staff.
