= HM Glendairy Prison =

Prison of Barbados

Coordinates: 13.1100°N 59.6027°W

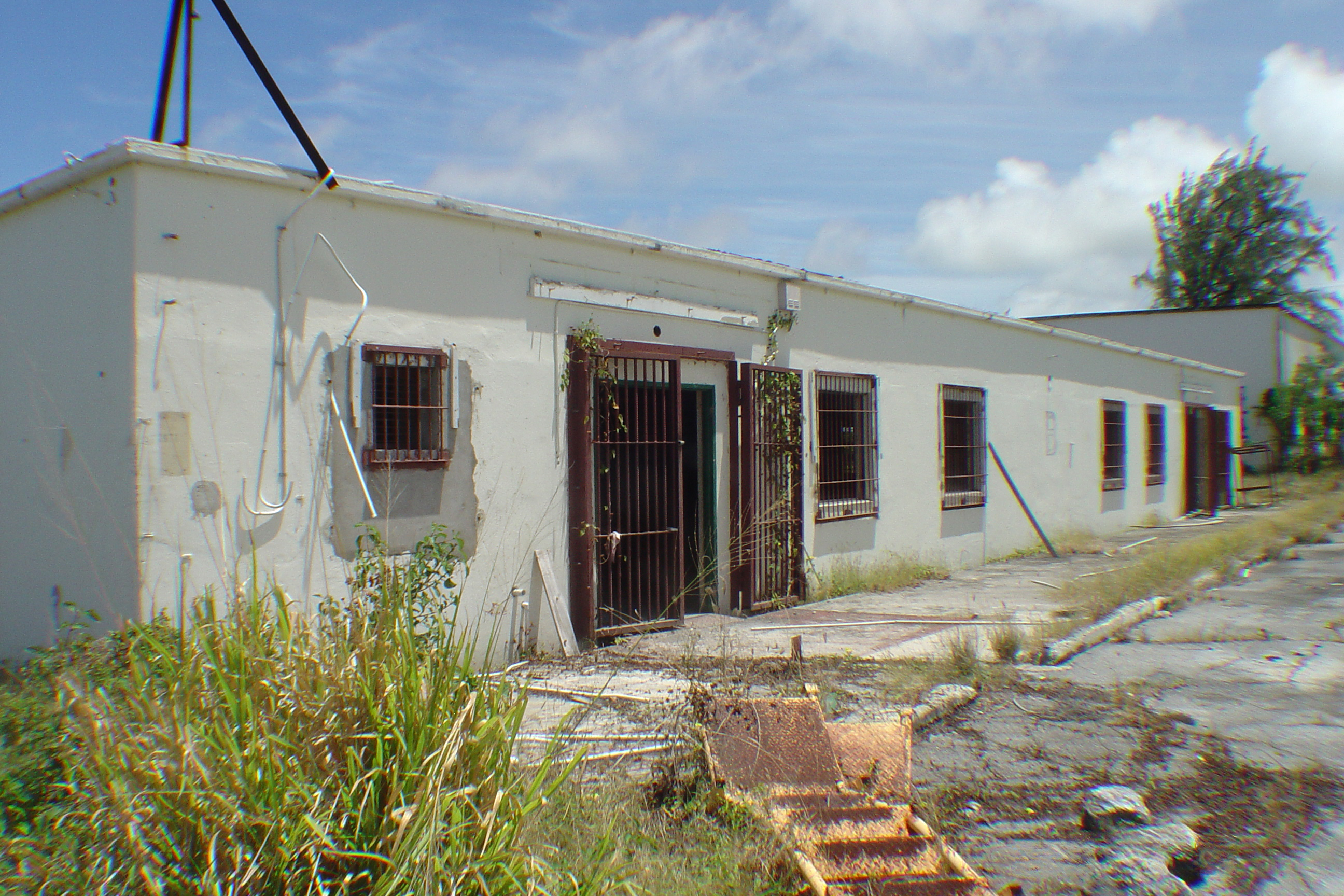
Formerly US Naval Base. Cell Block "B" Harrison's Point Prisons-Barbados.

Glendairy Prison, also called Her Majesty's Prison, was the correctional facility located in the country of Barbados. The prison, which housed up to 1,000 male and female inmates, was located in Station Hill, St. Michael.

== History ==
The prison was built in 1853-1855 before being 10% destroyed by fire, in a prison uprising on 29–30 March 2005. The replacement for Glendairy, known as HMP Dodds was opened on 15 October 2007 at Dodds, St. Philip.

A Commission of Inquiry has been set up to aid in an investigation of events which led to the riot and resulting fire.

Proposed alternate uses for the property have included: a rehabilitation centre for ex-offenders, halfway housing for persons addicted to drugs, or housing of individuals with a known mental illness.

== Controversies involving the prison ==
- Conprison art

Prison art Barbados

== In popular culture ==
Scenes of Glendairy Prison were featured in season six of the television show Locked Up Abroad. Documentaries and books have also been written by British prisoners at the new prison including Will Mellor and Terence Donaldson, who wrote Hell in Barbados.

== See also ==
- Barbados Police Service (BPS)
