= Richmond Hill Prison =

Prison in Saint George's, the capital of Grenada

His Majesty's Prison
- Emblem of His Majesty's Prison Service

- Location within Grenada
- Location: Saint George's, Grenada; 12.0488°N 61.7403°W
- Capacity: 198
- Population: 440 (2026)
- Opened: 1880
- Governor: Mr. Anthony Rogers

Richmond Hill Prison is a prison in Saint George's, the capital of Grenada. Known officially as His Majesty's Prison, it is run by the Ministry of National Security. The prison governor is Mr. Anthony Rogers, the Commissioner of Prisons in Grenada.

The prison has separate sections for male and female prisoners. As of 2019 it held 463 prisoners, more than double its official capacity of 198.

== History ==
The prison is on land that was used to house a military hospital since the late 18th century and the current building was converted into a prison in 1880. The wing for female prisoners was added in 1904.

The Grenadian politician Bernard Coard and other members of the Grenada 17 were imprisoned in Richmond Hill Prison. In a report in 2003, Amnesty International described the conditions they were kept in as inhumane. The last of the Grenada 17 prisoners were released in 2009.

On 25 October 1983, as part of the U.S. invasion of Grenada, the U.S. armed forces' Delta Force attempted to capture Richmond Hill Prison to retrieve political prisoners, flying in on helicopters operated by the 160th Aviation Battalion. The raid on the prison lacked vital intelligence, including the fact that several anti-aircraft guns defended it, and that the prison was on a steep hill without room for a helicopter to land. Anti-aircraft fire wounded passengers and crew and forced one MH-60 helicopter to crash land. The Black Hawk pilot was killed, but a Navy SH-3H helicopter rescued 11 crash survivors.
