= Georgian era =

Historical period in Britain from 1714 to c. 1830–37

- 1714 – 1830 (1837)
| Stuart period | Victorian era |
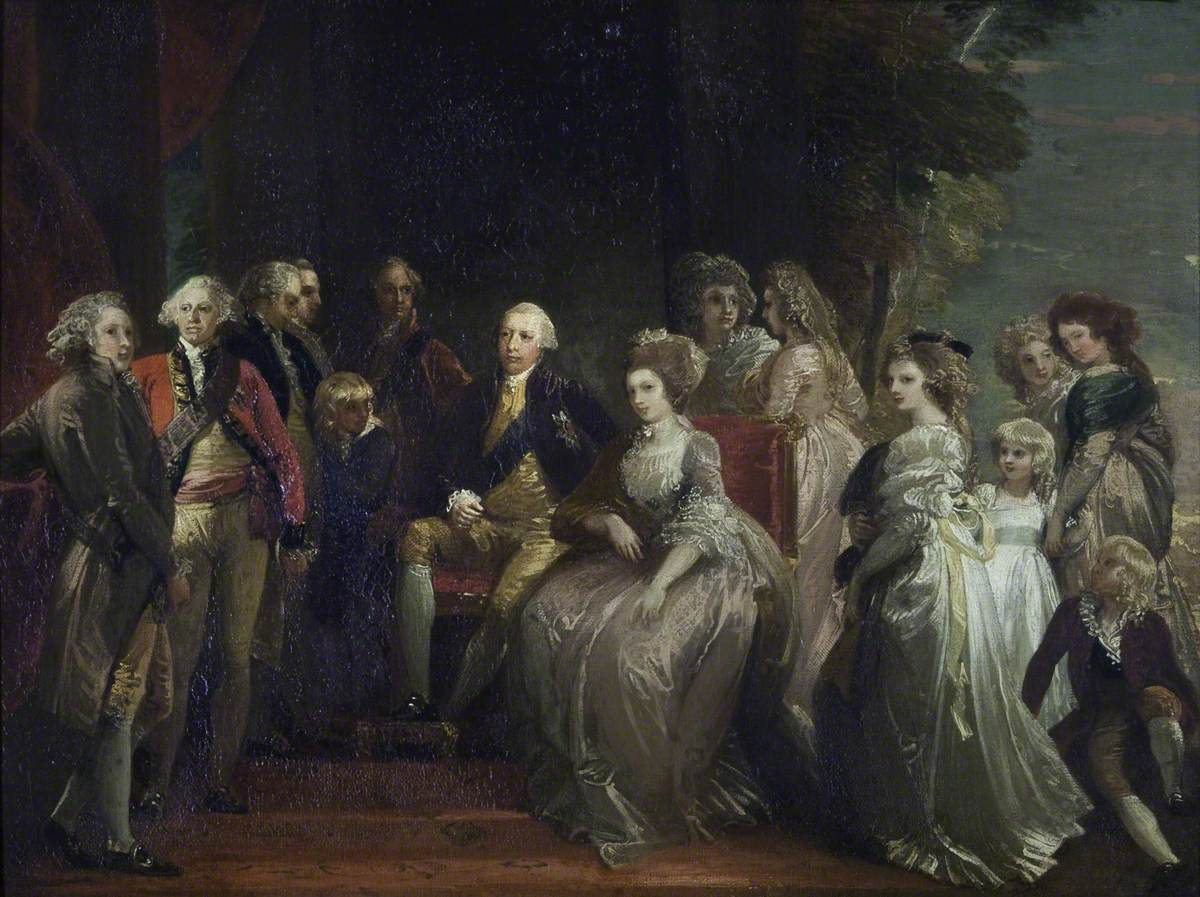
- Painting of King George III and his family by Thomas Stothard (1787)
- Including: Regency era
- Monarchs: George I; George II; George III; George IV; William IV
- Leaders: George, Prince of Wales; Queen Caroline; George, Prince Regent; Sir Robert Walpole; Lord Wilmington; Henry Pelham; Duke of Newcastle; Duke of Devonshire; Lord Bute; George Grenville; Lord Rockingham; Lord Chatham; Duke of Grafton; Lord North; Lord Shelburne; Duke of Portland; William Pitt the Younger; Henry Addington; Lord Grenville; Spencer Perceval; Lord Liverpool; George Canning; Lord Goderich; Duke of Wellington; Lord Grey; Lord Melbourne; Sir Robert Peel

The Georgian era was a period in British history from 1714 to 1830, named after the Hanoverian kings George I, George II, George III and George IV. The definition of the Georgian era is also often extended to include the relatively short reign of William IV, which ended with his death in 1837. The subperiod that is the Regency era is defined by the regency of George IV as Prince of Wales during the illness of his father George III. The term Georgian is typically used in the contexts of social and political history and architecture. The term Augustan literature is often used for Augustan drama, Augustan poetry and Augustan prose in the period 1700–1740s. The term Augustan refers to the acknowledgement of the influence of Latin literature from the ancient Roman Republic. The term Georgian era is not applied to the time of the two 20th-century British kings of this name, George V and George VI. Those periods are simply referred to as Georgian.

When Victoria became Queen in 1837 the Georgian era was followed by the Victorian era. The Victorians emphasized moral earnestness and propriety, as well as industrial and scientific progress and scientific advancement. There was a growing tension between faith and doubt and more Realism in literature and art (moving away from Romantic idealism).

== Politics ==
Historians have largely focused on politics, the first British Empire, and warfare during the Georgian era.

=== The King ===
On the positive side, George I's accession secured the Protestant succession and prevented a Catholic restoration under the "Old Pretender" James Stuart. The result was constitutional continuity after the turbulent Stuart period. The king's limited English and disinterest in day-to-day British affairs left a vacuum that was filled by the rise of modern parliamentary democracy. This enabled Robert Walpole to seize the initiative and emerge as Britain's first de facto Prime Minister; his new style of cabinet governance filled the royal vacuum. The British economy tripled in size in the 18th century but growth was only 12% during 1720 to 1740. There was some expansion of trade and commerce, building on the financial innovations of the previous decades. The South Sea Bubble of 1720 was a brief setback but it also led to improved financial regulation. The consolidation of Whig party dominance brought political stability and supported policies favoring commercial interests and religious toleration for Protestant dissenters.

On the negative side, the king was widely disliked as a foreigner who was far more interested in Hanover than in Britain. This fueled dissent and strengthened the Jacobite plans to overthrow the Hanoverians. Corruption was widespread, as exemplified by the South Sea Bubble scandal that financially ruined many investors, the king himself lost heavily in it. The king's bitter relationship with his son (the future George II) created political factions and instability at court, weakening the monarchy's prestige. George was ridiculed by many of his British subjects as unintelligent and wooden. His mistreatment of his wife, Sophia Dorothea, became something of a scandal. His Lutheran faith, his overseeing both the Lutheran churches in Hanover and the Church of England, and the presence of Lutheran preachers in his court caused some consternation among his Anglican subjects.

=== Politics to 1815 ===
The political history of the 18th century has been covered in numerous scholarly studies, mostly focused on the struggle between the Crown and Parliament.

=== Politics 1815 to 1830: Whigs and Tories ===
When the wars with France ended in 1815, political parties were not yet sharply defined nor well organized. In Parliament, and to a lesser extent around the country, there were loose political coalitions that people at the time, and historians today, call "Whigs" and "Tories."

== Social change ==
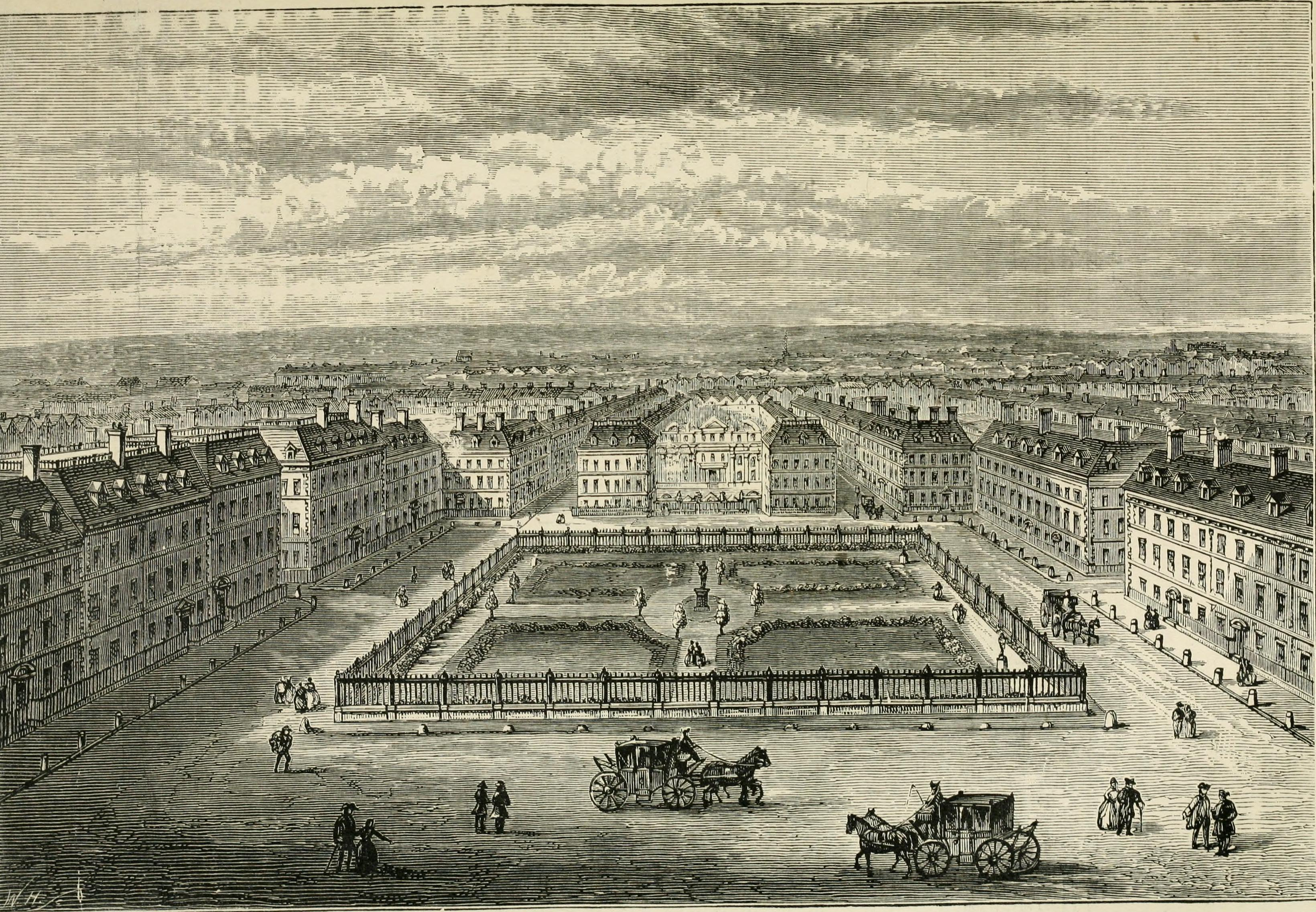
18th-century London (Soho Square)

The era marked immense social change in Britain, with the Industrial Revolution intensifying class divisions, increasing urbanization and prompting the emergence of rival political parties like the Whigs and Tories.

In rural areas, the Agricultural Revolution saw huge changes in the movement of people and the decline of small communities, as well as the growth of the cities and the beginnings of an integrated transportation system. Nevertheless, as rural towns and villages declined and work became scarce there was a large increase in emigration to Canada, the North American colonies, and other parts of the British Empire.

=== Evangelical religion and social reform ===
In England, the evangelical movement inside and outside the Church of England gained strength in the late 18th and early 19th century. The movement challenged the traditional religious sensibility that emphasised a code of honour for the upper class, and suitable behaviour for everyone else, together with faithful observances of rituals. John Wesley (1703–1791) and his followers preached revivalist religion, trying to convert individuals to a personal relationship with Christ through Bible reading, regular prayer, and especially the revival experience. Wesley himself preached 52,000 times, calling on men and women to "redeem the time" and save their souls. Wesley always operated inside the Church of England, but at his death, his followers set up outside institutions that became the Methodist Church. It stood alongside the traditional Nonconformist churches, Presbyterians, Congregationalist, Baptists, Unitarians, and Quakers. The Nonconformist churches, however, were less influenced by revivalism.

The Church of England remained dominant in England but it had a growing evangelical, revivalist faction, the "Low Church". Its leaders included William Wilberforce and Hannah More. It reached the upper class through the Clapham Sect. It did not seek political reform, but rather the opportunity to save souls through political action by freeing slaves, abolishing the duel, prohibiting cruelty to children and animals, stopping gambling, and avoiding frivolity on the Sabbath; they read the Bible every day. All souls were equal in God's view, but not all bodies, so evangelicals did not challenge the hierarchical structure of English society. As R. J. Morris noted in his 1983 article "Voluntary Societies and British Urban Elites, 1780-1850," "[m]id-eighteenth-century Britain was a stable society in the sense that those with material and ideological power were able to defend this power in an effective and dynamic manner," but "in the twenty years after 1780, this consensus structure was broken." Anglican Evangelicalism thus, as historian Lisa Wood has argued in her book Modes of Discipline: Women, Conservatism, and the Novel After the French Revolution, functioned as a tool of ruling-class social control, buffering the discontent that in France had inaugurated a revolution; yet it contained within itself the seeds for challenge to gender and class hierarchies.

=== Catholic emancipation in 1829 ===
Catholic emancipation was a series of Parliamentary actions that reduced and finally removed almost all of the restrictions on Roman Catholics in Britain and Ireland, culminating in the Roman Catholic Relief Act 1829. Many restrictions had been imposed by the Act of Uniformity, the Test Acts and the penal laws. Requirements to abjure (renounce) the temporal and spiritual authority of the pope and transubstantiation placed major burdens on Roman Catholics. Emancipation would allow them to vote and hold office.

According to Norman Lowe, The crisis stemmed from the grievances of Catholics in Ireland. They comprised about 90% of the population, were barred from sitting in Parliament and holding important government offices. Protestant not only held the power, they owned most of the land in Ireland, which they leased out to Catholic farmers. The Irish Catholics felt betrayed, as the Act of Union 1800 had been agreed upon with the promise of granting Catholics full political rights—Catholic Emancipation. George III (and later his son George IV) refused to assent, citing his Coronation Oath to uphold the Protestant religion. The new campaign for emancipation was led by Daniel O'Connell, an Irish Catholic landowner and barrister. He founded the Catholic Association in 1823, which quickly became powerful, funded by a "Catholic rent" of a penny a month from members, including poor peasants, and supported by Catholic priests. The Association focused on electing pro-emancipation Protestant candidates in by-elections. In the 1828 County Clare by-election, the crisis came as O’Connell stood against the pro-emancipation Protestant MP, Vesey Fitzgerald, in a by-election. Although as a Catholic he could not legally take his seat, O'Connell won a triumphant victory, demonstrating the immense Catholic support and the potential for scores of Catholics to win seats at the next general election. This electoral victory created a severe political crisis. There was a fear of widespread violence or even civil war if O'Connell and the potential Catholic MPs were prevented from taking their seats. It also raised the possibility that Catholic MPs might establish a separate parliament in Dublin, leading to the break-up of the Union between Britain and Ireland.

Horrified by the prospect of civil war, the Duke of Wellington –Britain's leading general and now prime minister, and Robert Peel his Home Secretary reversed their longstanding opposition to emancipation. They decided to concede because they were convinced that only this could avert major conflict. Peel skillfully had the bill for Catholic emancipation passed in the Commons, and Wellington forced its way through the House of Lords. King George IV reluctantly agreed, so in April 1829 emancipation became official. Catholics were now permitted to sit in both Houses of Parliament and hold all important nationwide offices of state, with a handful of exceptions (they could not be king or queen or top official in Ireland). However, as a measure to limit O'Connell's influence, the government simultaneously raised the property qualification for voting. This disenfranchised over 100,000 Catholic voters in Ireland. Even so, O'Connell still won re-election. Wellington and Peel gave the Catholics their main goal and prevented a civil war, but their treatment of O’Connell and the disenfranchisement of many Catholic tenant farmers angered the Irish Catholics. Likewise the Protestants were angry. Peel and Wellington's "betrayal" of their traditional anti-Catholic principles led to a deep split within the Tory coalition. alienating the right-wing 'Ultras' and much of the Tory press. In the next decade Catholic Emancipation was a model for reformers that showed the unwritten British constitution could be changed peacefully by a powerful pressure group from outside Parliament (the Catholic Association). This weakened the Tories and paved the way for the Whigs to come to power in 1830 with their own plans for major parliamentary reform.

== An old empire lost, a new one expanded ==
The Georgian period saw continual warfare, with France the primary enemy. Major episodes included the Seven Years' War, known in America as the French and Indian War (1754–1763), the American Revolutionary War (1775–1783), the French Revolutionary Wars (1792–1802), the Irish Rebellion of 1798, and the Napoleonic Wars (1803–1815). The British won most of the wars except for the American Revolution, where the combined weight of the United States, France, Spain and the Netherlands overwhelmed Britain, which stood alone without allies.

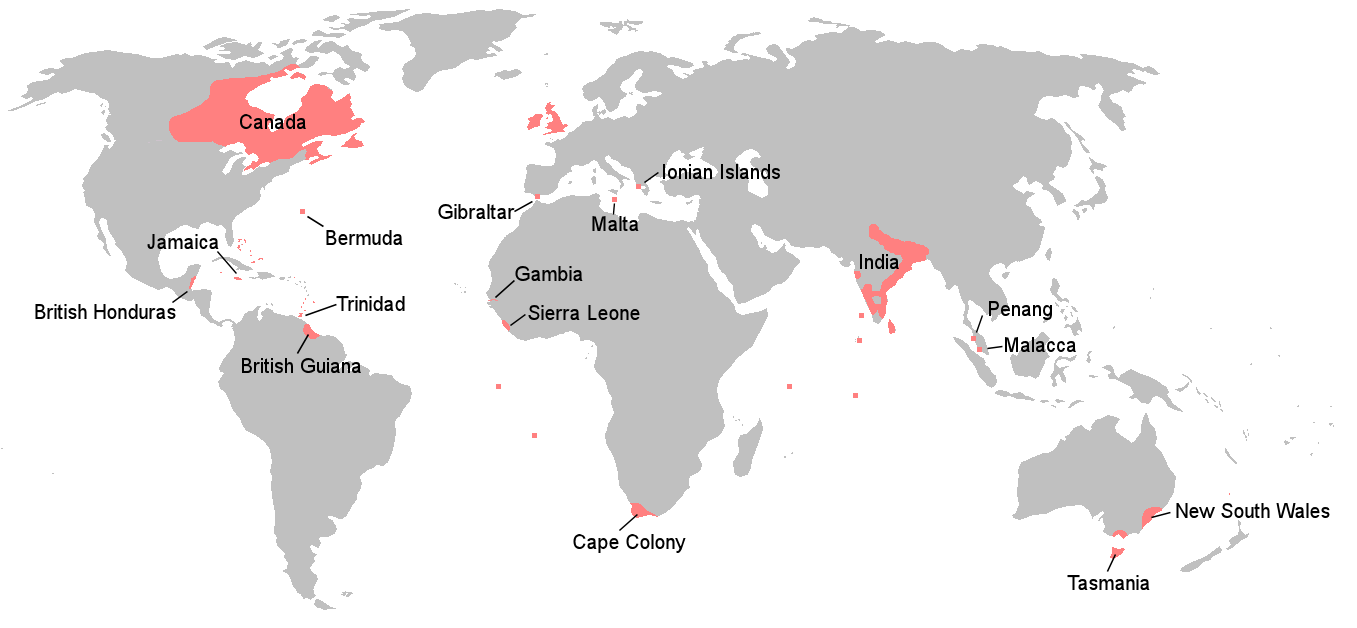
The British Empire at the end of the Napoleonic Wars in 1815

The loss of the 13 American Colonies was a national disaster. Commentators at home and abroad speculated on the end of Britain as a great power. In Europe, the wars with France dragged on for nearly a quarter of a century, 1793–1815. Britain organised coalition after coalition, using its superb financial system to subsidise infantry forces, and built up its Navy to maintain control of the seas. Victory over Napoleon at the Battle of Trafalgar (1805) and the Battle of Waterloo (1815) under Admiral Lord Nelson and the Duke of Wellington brought a sense of triumphalism and political reaction.

The expansion of empire in Asia was primarily the work of the British East India Company, especially under the leadership of Robert Clive. Captain James Cook was perhaps the most prominent of the many explorers and geographers using the resources of the Royal Navy to develop the Empire and make many scientific discoveries, especially in Australia and the Pacific. Instead of trying to recover the lost colonies in North America, the British built up in Asia a largely new Second British Empire. That new empire flourished during the Victorian and Edwardian eras which were to follow.

=== The trading nation ===
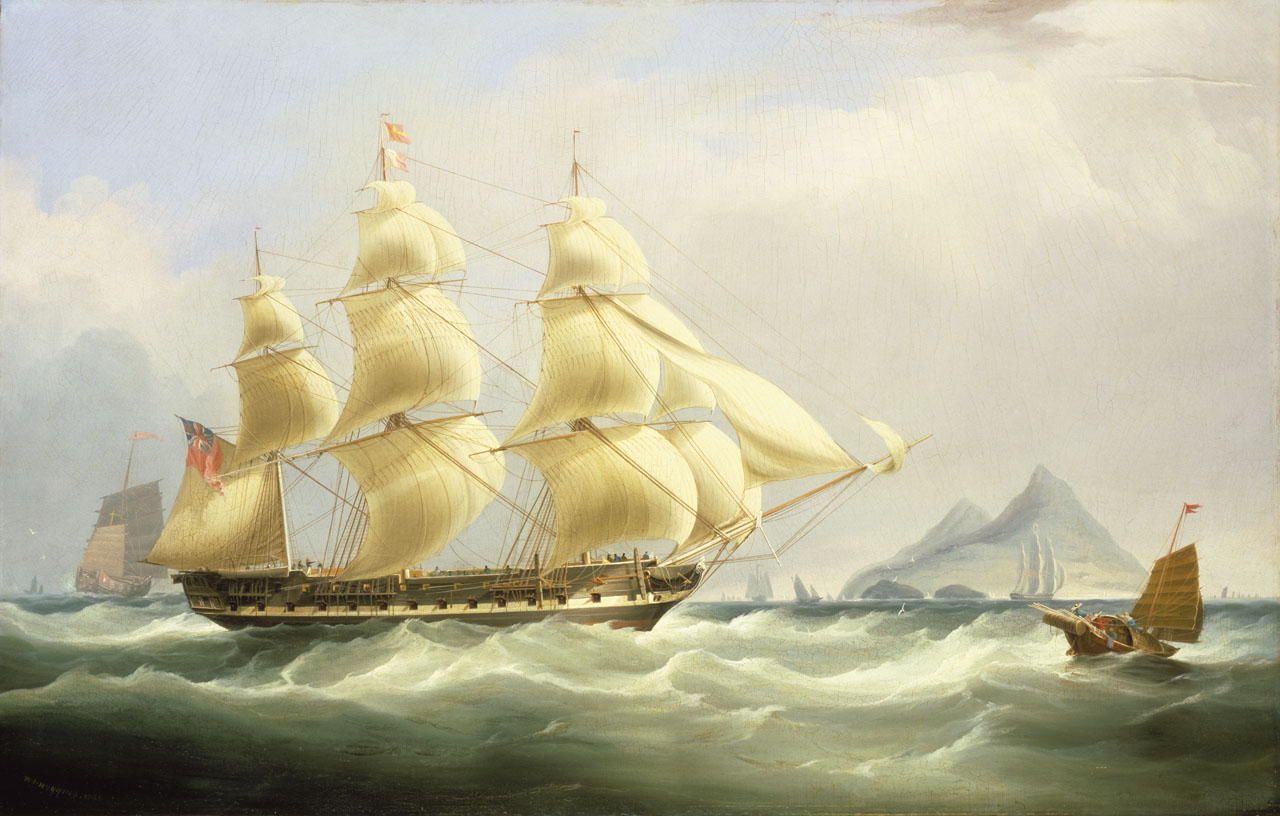
East Indiaman in the China Seas

The era was prosperous as entrepreneurs extended the range of their business around the globe. By the 1720s Britain was one of the most prosperous countries in the world, and Daniel Defoe boasted:

we are the most "diligent nation in the world. Vast trade, rich manufactures, mighty wealth, universal correspondence, and happy success have been constant companions of England, and given us the title of an industrious people."

While the other major powers were primarily motivated towards territorial gains, and protection of their dynasties (such as the Habsburg and Bourbon dynasties, and the House of Hohenzollern), Britain had a different set of primary interests. Its main diplomatic goal (besides protecting the homeland from invasion) was building a worldwide trading network for its merchants, manufacturers, shippers and financiers. This required a hegemonic Royal Navy so powerful that no rival could sweep its ships from the world's trading routes, or invade the British Isles. The London government enhanced the private sector by incorporating numerous privately financed London-based companies for establishing trading posts and opening import-export businesses across the world. Each was given a monopoly of trade to the specified geographical region. The first enterprise was the Muscovy Company set up in 1555 to trade with Russia. Other prominent enterprises included the East India Company, and the Hudson's Bay Company in Canada. The Company of Royal Adventurers Trading to Africa had been set up in 1662 to trade in gold, ivory and slaves in Africa; it was re-established as the Royal African Company in 1672 and focused on the slave trade. British involvement in each of the four major wars, 1740 to 1783, paid off handsomely in terms of trade. Even the loss of the 13 colonies was made up by a very favourable trading relationship with the new United States of America. British gained dominance in the trade with India, and largely dominated the highly lucrative slave, sugar, and commercial trades originating in West Africa and the West Indies. China would be next on the agenda. Other powers set up similar monopolies on a much smaller scale; only the Netherlands emphasized trade as much as England.

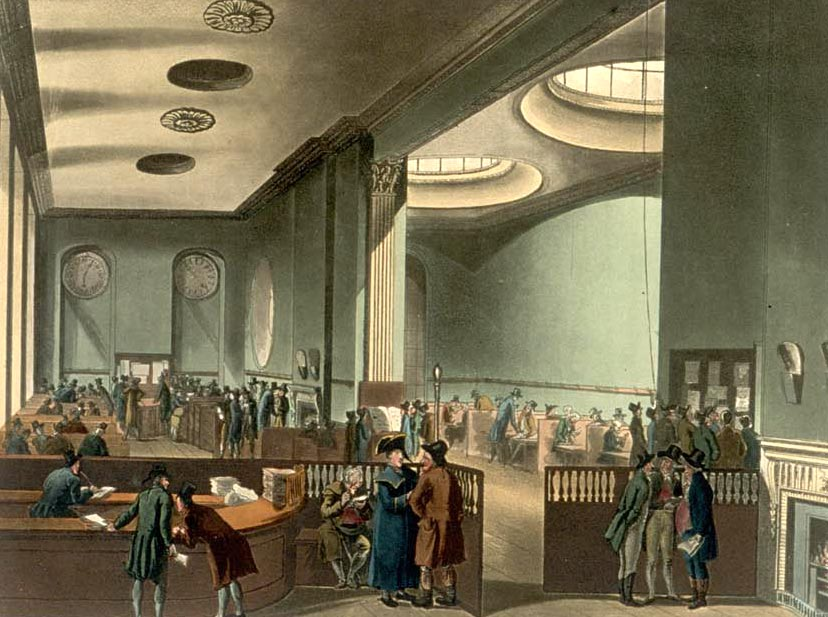
The subscription room at Lloyd's of London in the early 19th century

Mercantilism was the basic policy imposed by Britain on its colonies. Mercantilism meant that the government and the merchants became partners with the goal of increasing political power and private wealth, to the exclusion of other empires. The government protected its merchants—and kept others out—by trade barriers, regulations, and subsidies to domestic industries in order to maximise exports from and minimise imports to the realm. The government had to fight smuggling, which became a favourite American technique in the 18th century to circumvent the restrictions on trading with the French, Spanish or Dutch. The goal of mercantilism was to run trade surpluses, so that gold and silver would pour into London. The government took its share through duties and taxes, with the remainder going to merchants in Britain. The government spent much of its revenue on a large and powerful Royal Navy, which not only protected the British colonies but threatened the colonies of the other empires, and sometimes seized them. The colonies were captive markets for British industry, and the goal was to enrich the mother country.

Most of the companies earned good profits, and enormous personal fortunes were created in India, but there was one major fiasco that caused heavy losses. The South Sea Bubble was a business enterprise that exploded in scandal. The South Sea Company was a private business corporation supposedly set up much like the other trading companies, with a focus on South America. Its actual purpose was to renegotiate previous high-interest government loans amounting to £31 million through market manipulation and speculation. It issued stock four times in 1720 that reached about 8,000 investors. Prices kept soaring every day, from £130 a share to £1,000, with insiders making huge paper profits. The Bubble collapsed overnight, ruining many speculators. Investigations showed bribes had reached into high places—even to the king. The future prime minister Robert Walpole managed to wind it down with minimal political and economic damage, although some suffering extreme loss fled to exile or committed suicide.

== Political and social revolt ==
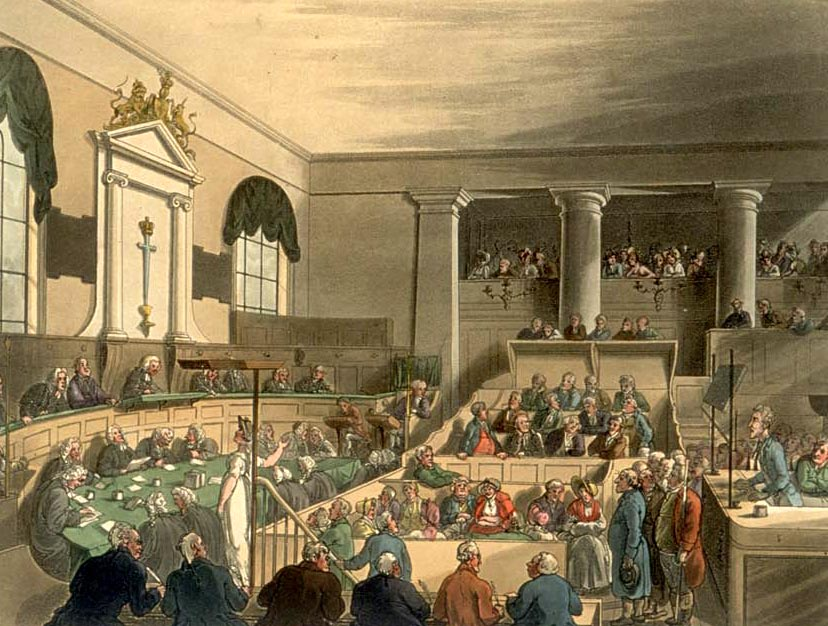
An Old Bailey trial, c. 1808

The beginning of the Georgian era witnessed rioting by Jacobite and High Church mobs in protest against the Hanoverian succession and which included attacks on the Dissenters' places of worship. These included the 1714 coronation riots, which occurred on the day of George I's coronation, and the riots of 1715. In response, Parliament passed the Riot Act, which granted the authorities greater powers to put down rioting.

Although religious toleration was extensive by the standards of continental Europe, hostility to religious minorities was widespread in Britain during the eighteenth century and sometimes expressed itself in rioting. The Jewish Naturalisation Act 1753 was repealed a year after it had been passed because of widespread opposition and the 1780 Gordon Riots in London were directed against Catholics after the Papists Act 1778 removed some of their legal disabilities. During the 1791 Priestley Riots in Birmingham, the mob targeted Dissenters, including the prominent Radical Joseph Priestley.

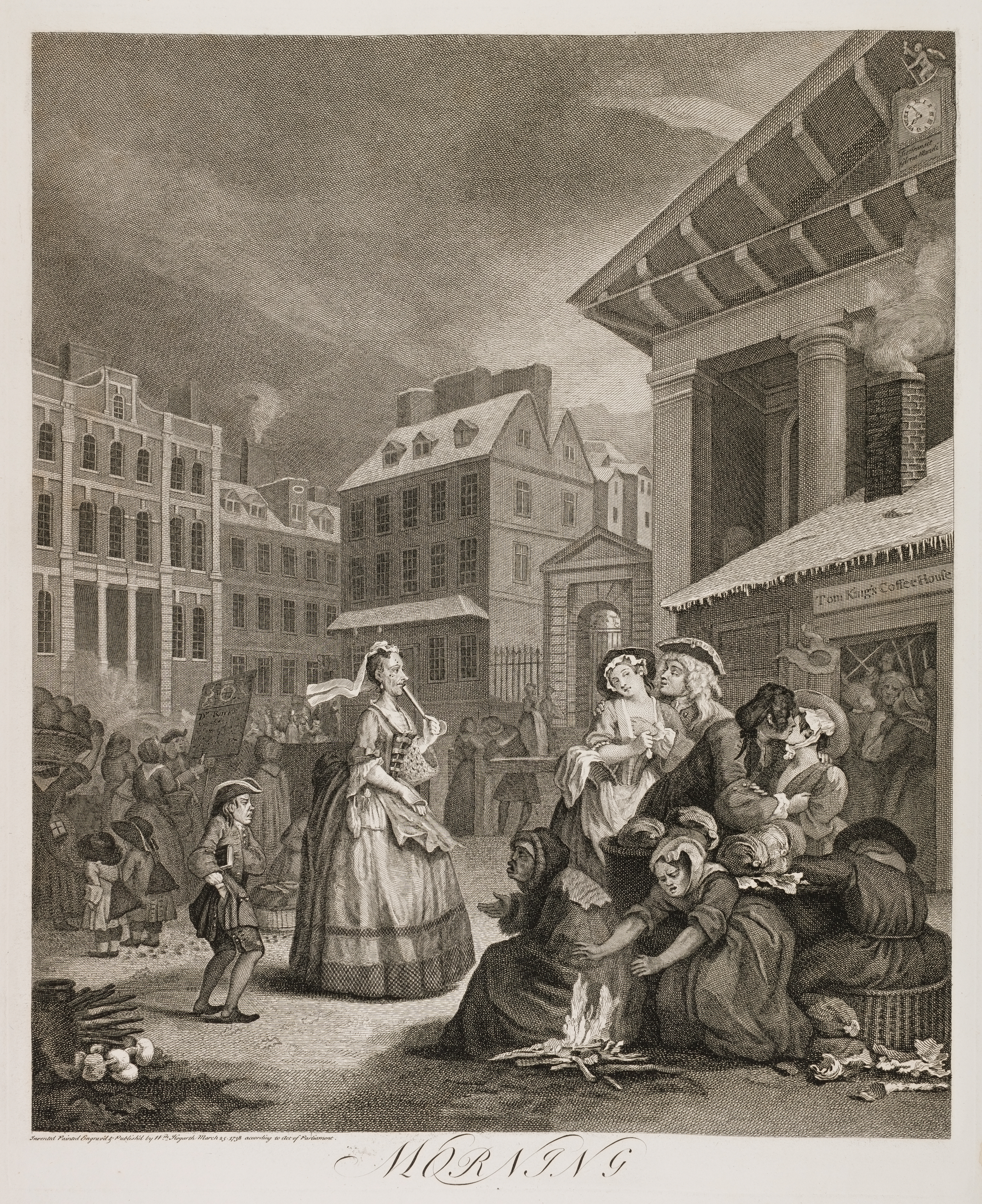
Life in the streets of London, by William Hogarth

The Black Act 1723, sponsored by Robert Walpole, strengthened the criminal code for the benefit of the upper class. It specified over 200 capital crimes, many with intensified punishment. The crime of arson, for example, was expanded to include of burning or the threat of burning haystacks. The legal rights of defendants were something different from today. For example, suspects who refused to surrender within 40 days could be summarily judged guilty and sentenced to execution if apprehended. Local villages were punished if they failed to find, prosecute and convict alleged criminals, due to the increase in crime at the time.

=== Social unrest 1815-1820 ===
With the ending of the Napoleonic Wars in 1815, Great Britain entered a period of greater economic depression and political uncertainty, characterised by social discontent and unrest. The Radical political party published a leaflet called The Political Register, also known as "The Two Penny Trash" to its rivals. The so-called March of the Blanketeers saw 400 spinners and weavers march from Manchester to London in March 1817 to hand the Government a petition. The Luddites destroyed and damaged machinery in the industrial north-west of England. The Peterloo Massacre in 1819 began as a protest rally which saw 60,000 people gathering to protest about their living standards. It was quelled by military action and saw eleven people killed and 400 wounded. The Cato Street Conspiracy of 1820 sought to blow up the Cabinet and then move on to storm the Tower of London and overthrow the government. This too was thwarted, with the conspirators executed or transported to Australia.

== Enlightenment ==
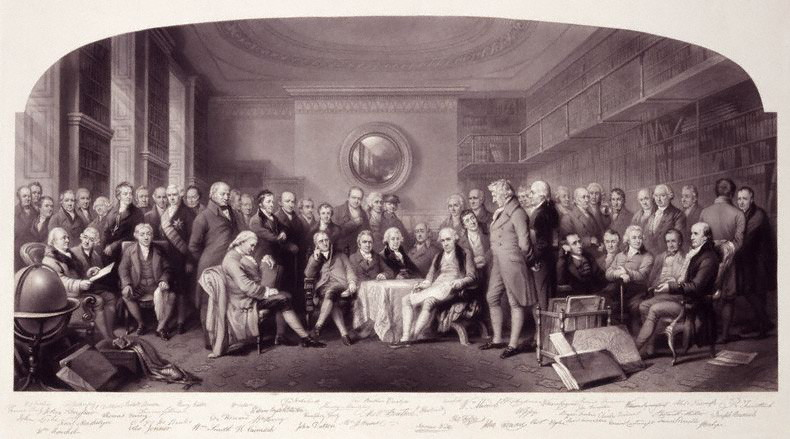
Distinguished Men of Science. Use the cursor to see who is who.

Historians have long explored the importance of the Scottish Enlightenment, as well as the American Enlightenment, while debating the very existence of the English Enlightenment.

=== Scottish Enlightenment ===
English historian Peter Gay argues that the Scottish Enlightenment "was a small and cohesive group of friends – David Hume, Adam Smith, Adam Ferguson, and others – who knew one another intimately and talked to one another incessantly". Education was a priority in Scotland, both at the local level and especially in four universities. The Enlightenment culture was based on close readings of new books, and intense discussions that took place daily at such intellectual gathering places in Edinburgh as The Select Society and, later, The Poker Club as well as within Scotland's ancient universities (St Andrews, Glasgow, Edinburgh and Aberdeen). Sharing the humanist and rationalist outlook of the European Enlightenment of the same time period, the thinkers of the Scottish Enlightenment asserted the importance of human reason combined with a rejection of any authority that could not be justified by reason. In Scotland, the Enlightenment was characterised by a thoroughgoing empiricism and practicality where the chief values were improvement, virtue, and practical benefit for the individual and society as a whole. Among the fields that rapidly advanced were philosophy, economics, history, architecture, and medicine. Leaders included Francis Hutcheson, David Hume, Adam Smith, Dugald Stewart, Thomas Reid, William Robertson, Henry Home, Lord Kames, Adam Ferguson, John Playfair, Joseph Black and James Hutton.

=== English Enlightenment ===
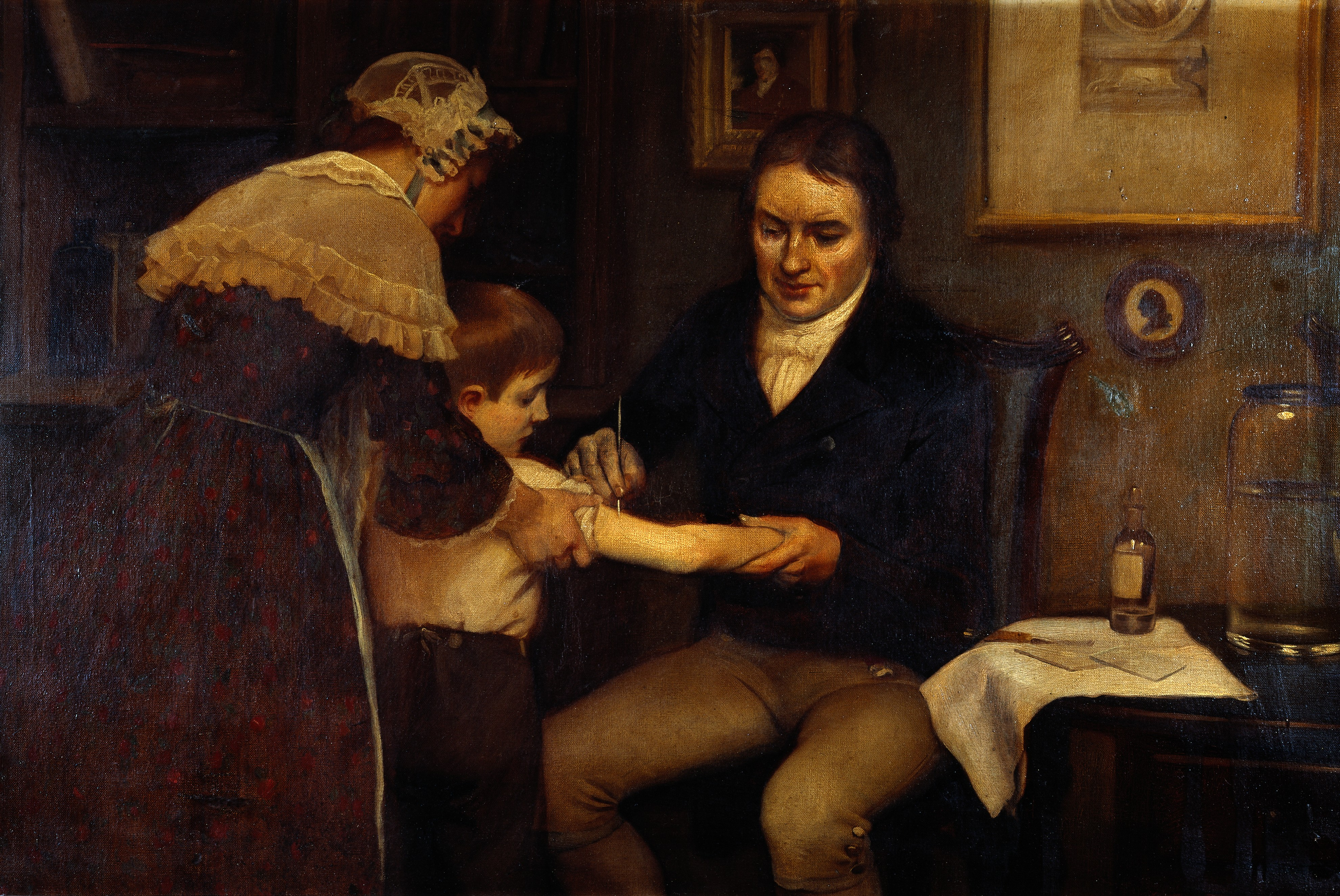
Edward Jenner performing his first vaccination in 1796

The very existence of an English Enlightenment has been debated by scholars. The majority of textbooks and standard surveys make no room for an English Enlightenment. Some European surveys include England, others ignore it but do include coverage of such major intellectuals as Joseph Addison, Edward Gibbon, John Locke, Isaac Newton, Alexander Pope and Joshua Reynolds.

According to Derek Hirst, the 1640s and 1650s saw a revived economy characterised by growth in manufacturing, the elaboration of financial and credit instruments, and the commercialisation of communication. The gentry found time for leisure activities, such as horse racing and bowling. In the high culture important innovations included the development of a mass market for music, increased scientific research, and an expansion of publishing. All the trends were discussed in depth at the newly established coffee houses. Education was also a priority in England. English institutions expanded rapidly, including the formation of the Royal Society, which is the oldest national scientific institution in the world.

Roy Porter argues that the reason for the neglect was the assumption that the movement was primarily French-inspired, that it was largely a-religious or anti-clerical, and it stood in outspoken defiance to the established order. Porter admits that after the 1720s, England could claim thinkers to equal Diderot, Voltaire or Rousseau. Indeed, its leading intellectuals, such as Edward Gibbon, Edmund Burke and Samuel Johnson were all quite conservative and supported the standing order. Porter says the reason was that Enlightenment had come early to England, and had succeeded so that the culture had accepted political liberalism, philosophical empiricism and religious toleration of the sort that intellectuals on the continent had to fight for against powerful odds. The coffee-house culture provided an ideal venue for enlightened conversation. Furthermore, England rejected the collectivism of the continent, and emphasized the improvement of individuals as the main goal of enlightenment.

=== Science and medicine ===
The British sponsored numerous scientists who made major discoveries in the small laboratories. Joseph Priestley investigated electricity. Chemist Henry Cavendish identified hydrogen in 1772. Daniel Rutherford isolated nitrogen in 1774, while Priestley discovered oxygen and ammonia. Antiquarians and archaeologists mapped the past. In medicine, in 1717 Lady Mary Wortley Montagu introduced inoculation against smallpox to Britain, and by 1740 it was in wide usage. Guy's Hospital was founded in 1721; the Royal Infirmary of Edinburgh in 1729; Queen Charlotte's maternity hospital in 1739 and the Middlesex Hospital in 1745. Asylums for the mentally ill were established, notably Bethel Hospital in Norwich (1713); a ward for incurable lunatics at Guy's Hospital (1728); and lunatic hospitals in Manchester (1766) and York in (1777)—York was the first to be called an asylum.

== Arts and culture ==
High culture flourished during the Georgian era. Georgian society and its preoccupations were well portrayed in the novels of writers such as Daniel Defoe, Jonathan Swift, Samuel Richardson, Henry Fielding, Laurence Sterne, Mary Shelley and Jane Austen, characterised by the architecture of Robert Adam, John Nash and James Wyatt and the emergence of the Gothic Revival style, which hearkened back to a supposed golden age of building design.

The flowering of the arts was most vividly shown in the emergence of the Romantic poets, principally through Samuel Taylor Coleridge, William Wordsworth, Percy Bysshe Shelley, William Blake, John Keats, Lord Byron and Robert Burns. Their work ushered in a new era of poetry, characterised by vivid and colourful language, evocative of elevating ideas and themes.

The paintings of Thomas Gainsborough, Sir Joshua Reynolds and the young J. M. W. Turner and John Constable illustrated the changing world of the Georgian period – as did the work of designers like Capability Brown, the landscape designer.

Fine examples of distinctive Georgian architecture are Edinburgh's New Town, Georgian Dublin, Grainger Town in Newcastle upon Tyne, the Georgian Quarter of Liverpool and much of Bristol and Bath.

The music of John Field, Handel, Haydn, Clementi, Johann Christian Bach, William Boyce, Mozart, Beethoven and Mendelssohn was some of the most popular in England at that time.

=== Grand Tour ===
The height of the Grand Tour coincided with the 18th century and is associated with Georgian high society. This custom saw young upper-class Englishmen travelling to Italy by way of France and the Netherlands for intellectual and cultural purposes. Notable historian Edward Gibbon remarked of the Grand Tour as useful for intellectual self-improvement. The journey and stay abroad would usually take a year or more. This eventually led to the basis for the acquisition and spread of art collections back to England as well as fashions and paintings from Italy. The custom also helped popularise the macaroni style that was soon to become fashionable at the time.

== Ending ==
Historians debate the exact ending, with the deaths of George IV in 1830 or William IV in 1837 as the usual marker. In most social and cultural trends, the timing varied. The emergence of Romanticism and literature began as early as the 1780s, but religious changes took much longer and were incomplete until around a century later. The 1830s saw important developments such as the emergence of the Oxford Movement in religion and the demise of classical architecture. Victorians typically were disapproving of the times of the previous era. By the late 19th century, the "Georgian era" was a byword for a degenerate culture. Charles Abbey in 1878 argued that the Church of England:

partook of the general sordidness of the age; it was an age of great material prosperity, but of moral and spiritual poverty, such as hardly finds a parallel in our history. Mercenary motives were to predominate everywhere, in the Church as well as in the state.

== Timeline ==
1714
Upon the death of his second cousin Queen Anne, George Louis, Elector of Hanover, succeeds as the new King, George I, of Great Britain and Ireland, the former of which had itself been established in 1707. This is the beginning of the House of Hanover's reign over the British Crown.

1715
The Whig Party wins the British parliamentary election for the House of Commons. This party is dominant until 1760.

1727
George I dies on 11 June. His son George, Prince of Wales, ascends to the throne as George II.

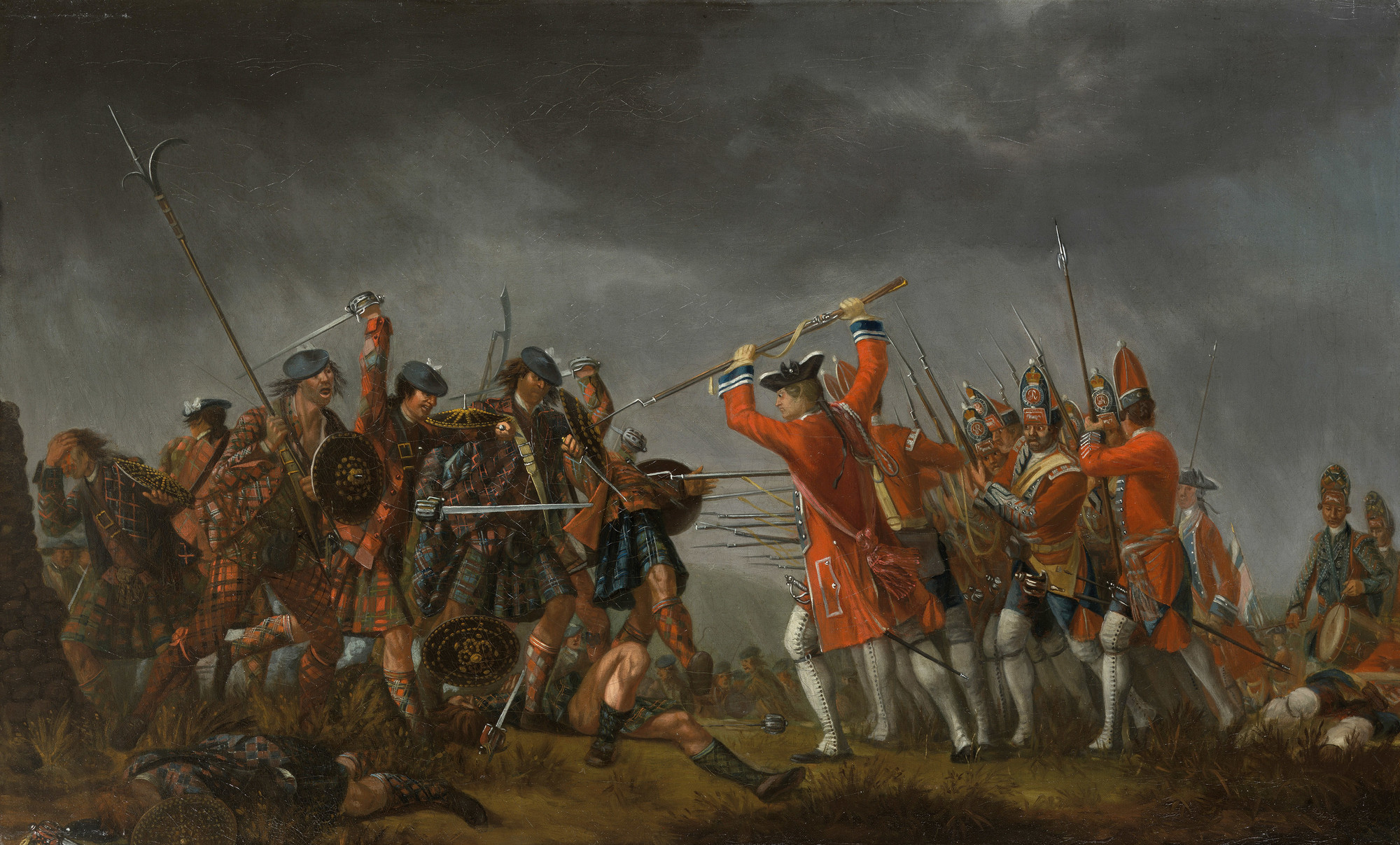
An Incident in the Rebellion of 1745, depicting the Battle of Culloden of 1746, where British troops defeated the Jacobite Army

1745
The final Jacobite rising is crushed at the Battle of Culloden in April 1746.

1760
George II dies on 25 October, and his grandson George, Prince of Wales, ascends to the throne as George III.

1763
Britain is victorious in the Seven Years' War. The Treaty of Paris of 1763 grants Britain domain over vast new territories around the world.

1765
The Stamp Act is passed by the Parliament of Great Britain, causing much unrest in the Thirteen Colonies in North America.

1769–1770
Australia and New Zealand are claimed as British colonies.

1773
The Inclosure Act 1773 is put into place by the British Parliament. This act brought about the enclosure of land and removing the right of common land access. This began an internal mass movement of rural poor from the countryside into the cities.

1775
The American Revolutionary War begins in the Thirteen Colonies, specifically in Massachusetts; all royal officials are expelled.

1776
The Thirteen Colonies in North America declare their independence. King George III is determined to recover them.

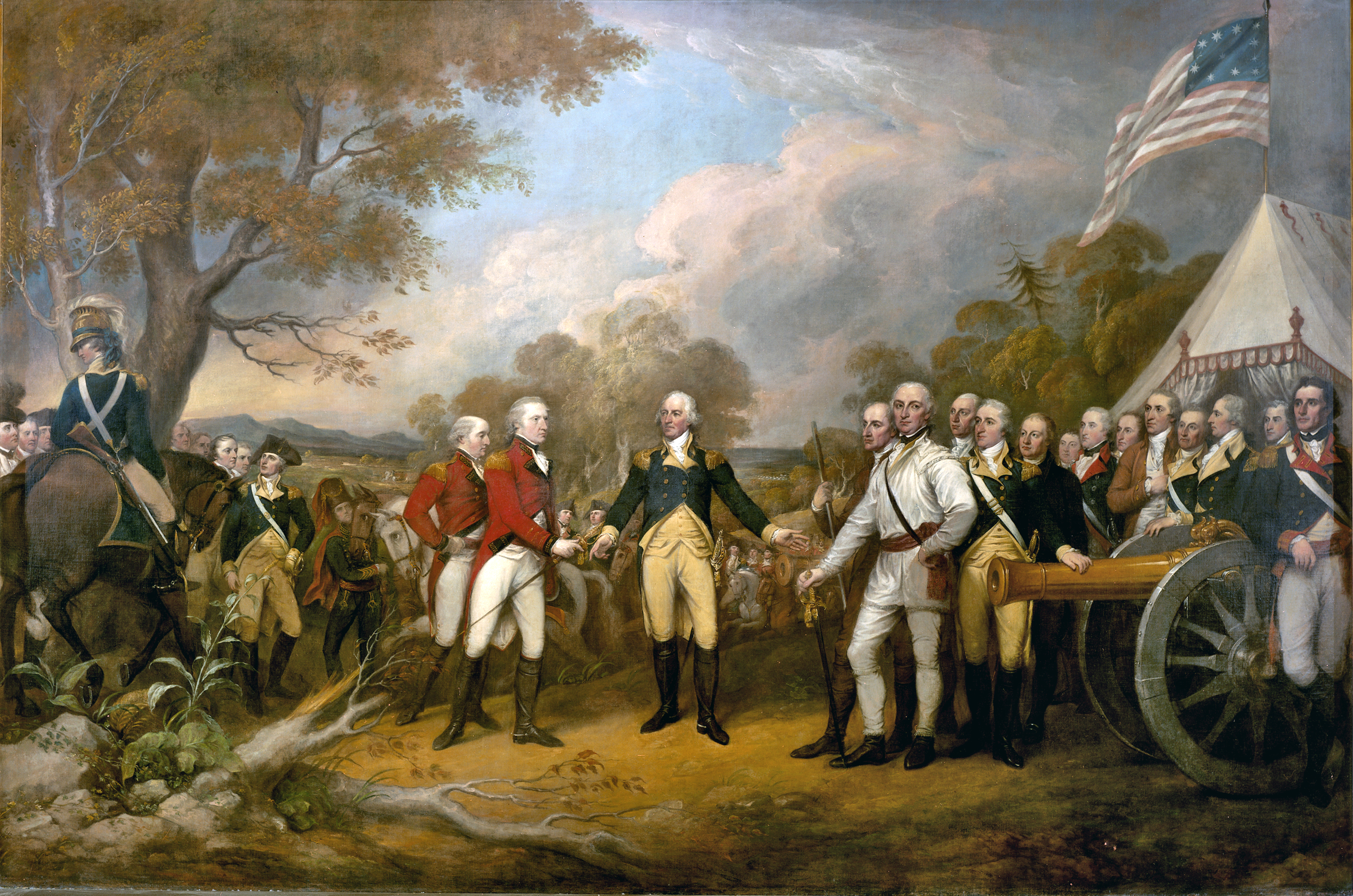
British general John Burgoyne shown surrendering at Saratoga in 1777

1777
The main British invasion army under Gen. Burgoyne surrenders at Saratoga; the French increase their aid to the Americans.

1778
France forms in a military alliance with the United States and declares war on Britain. The Netherlands and Spain support France; Britain has no major allies.

1781
The British Army in America under Lord Cornwallis surrenders to George Washington after its defeat in Yorktown, Virginia, in October 1781. The French Navy controls the seas.

1782
Battle of the Saintes: Admiral Sir George Rodney defeated a French fleet under the Comte de Grasse, enabling the Royal Navy to control the West Indies.

1783
Great Britain formally recognises the independence of the original 13 American States in the Treaty of Paris of 1783. The geographical terms are very generous to the Americans, and the expectation that Anglo-American trade will become of major importance.

1788
Australia is settled through penal transportation to the colony of New South Wales from 26 January.

1789
Thomas Robert Malthus, an Anglican cleric, authors An Essay on the Principle of Population. This work, the origin of Malthusianism, posited a need for population control to avoid poverty and famine or conflict over scarce resources.

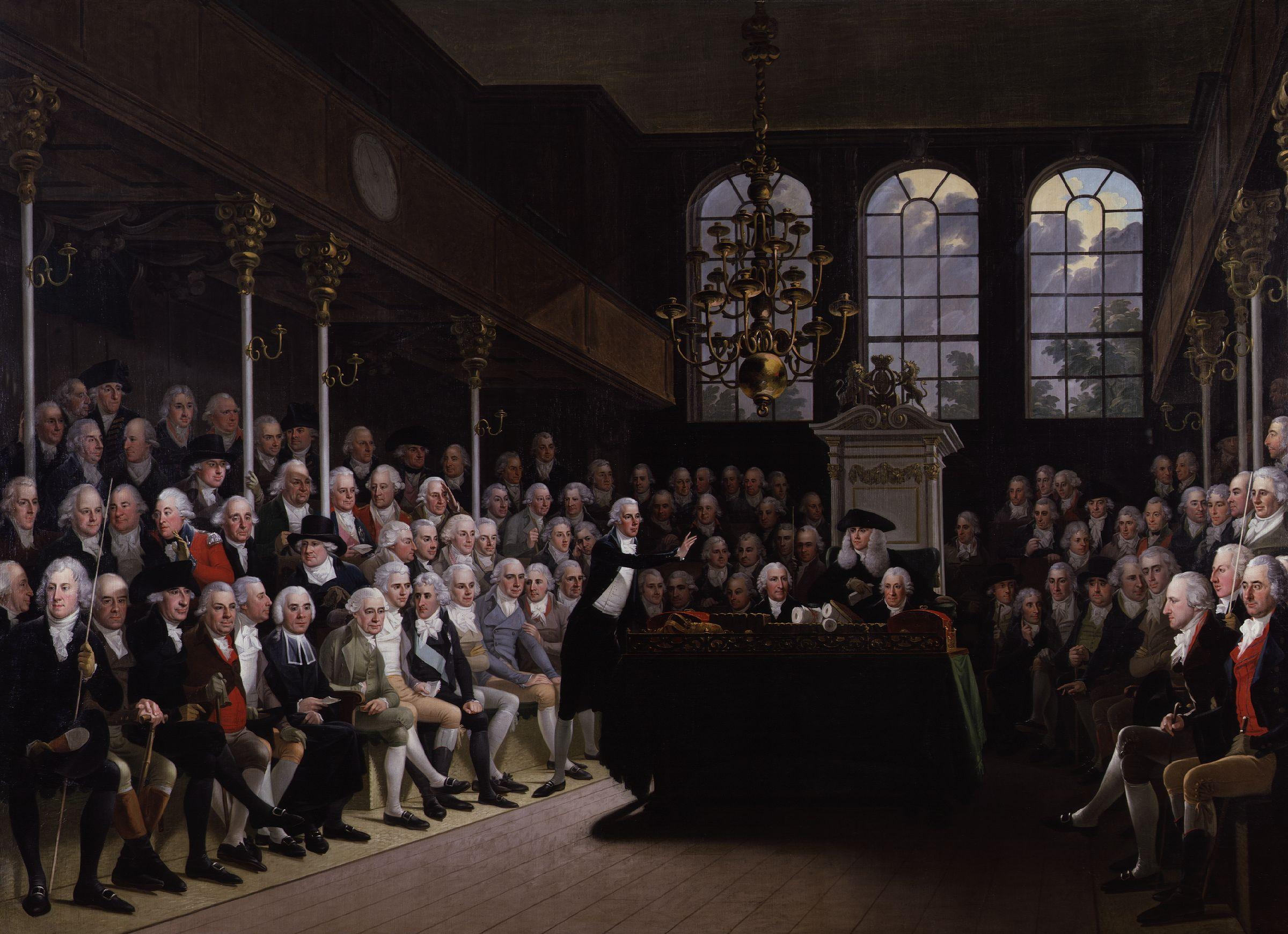
William Pitt the Younger addressing the House of Commons on the outbreak of war with France in 1793

1801
The Act of Union 1800 comes into effect on 1 January, uniting the Kingdoms of Great Britain and of Ireland into the United Kingdom of Great Britain and Ireland.

1807
The Abolition of the Slave Trade Act became law, making it illegal to engage in the slave trade throughout the British Empire, partly as a result of a twenty-year parliamentary campaign by William Wilberforce.

1811
George, Prince of Wales, begins his nine-year period as the regent (he became known as George, Prince Regent) for George III, who had become delusional. This sub-period of the Georgian era is known as the Regency era.

1815
Napoleon I of France is defeated by the Seventh Coalition under The Duke of Wellington at the Battle of Waterloo.

1819
The Peterloo Massacre occurs.

1820
George III dies on 29 January, and his son George, Prince Regent, ascends to the throne of the United Kingdom of Great Britain and Ireland as George IV. He had been the effective ruler since 1811 as regent for his seriously ill father.

1830
George IV dies on 26 June. Some historians date this as the end of the Georgian era of the House of Hanover. However, many other authorities continue this era during the relatively short reign of his younger brother, who became King William IV.

1833
Slavery Abolition Act passed by Parliament through the influence of William Wilberforce and the Evangelical movement. The slaveowners are generously paid off.

1837
Transition to the Victorian era. King William IV dies on 20 June, ending the Georgian era. He was succeeded by his niece, Queen Victoria.

== Monarchs ==
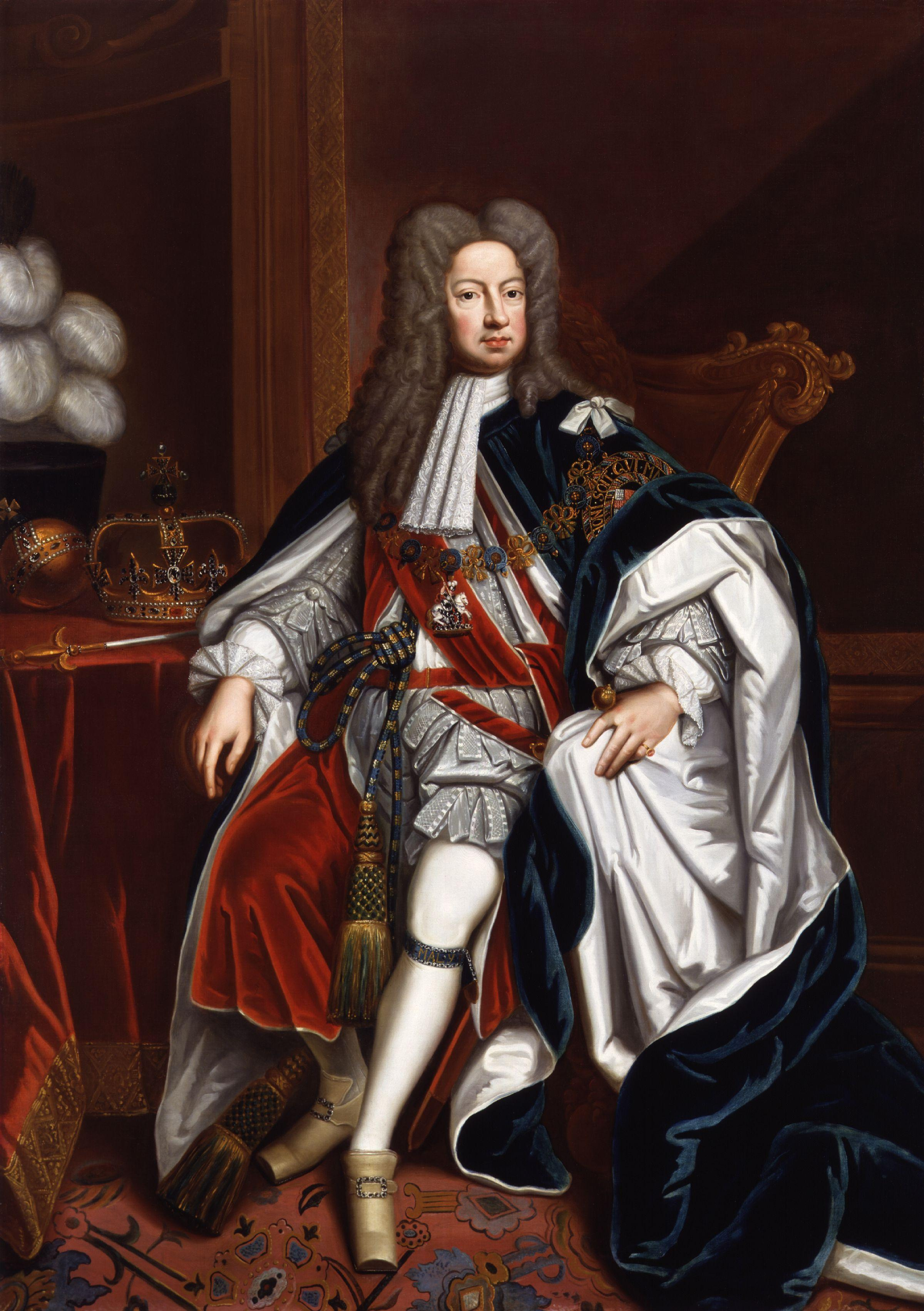
George I

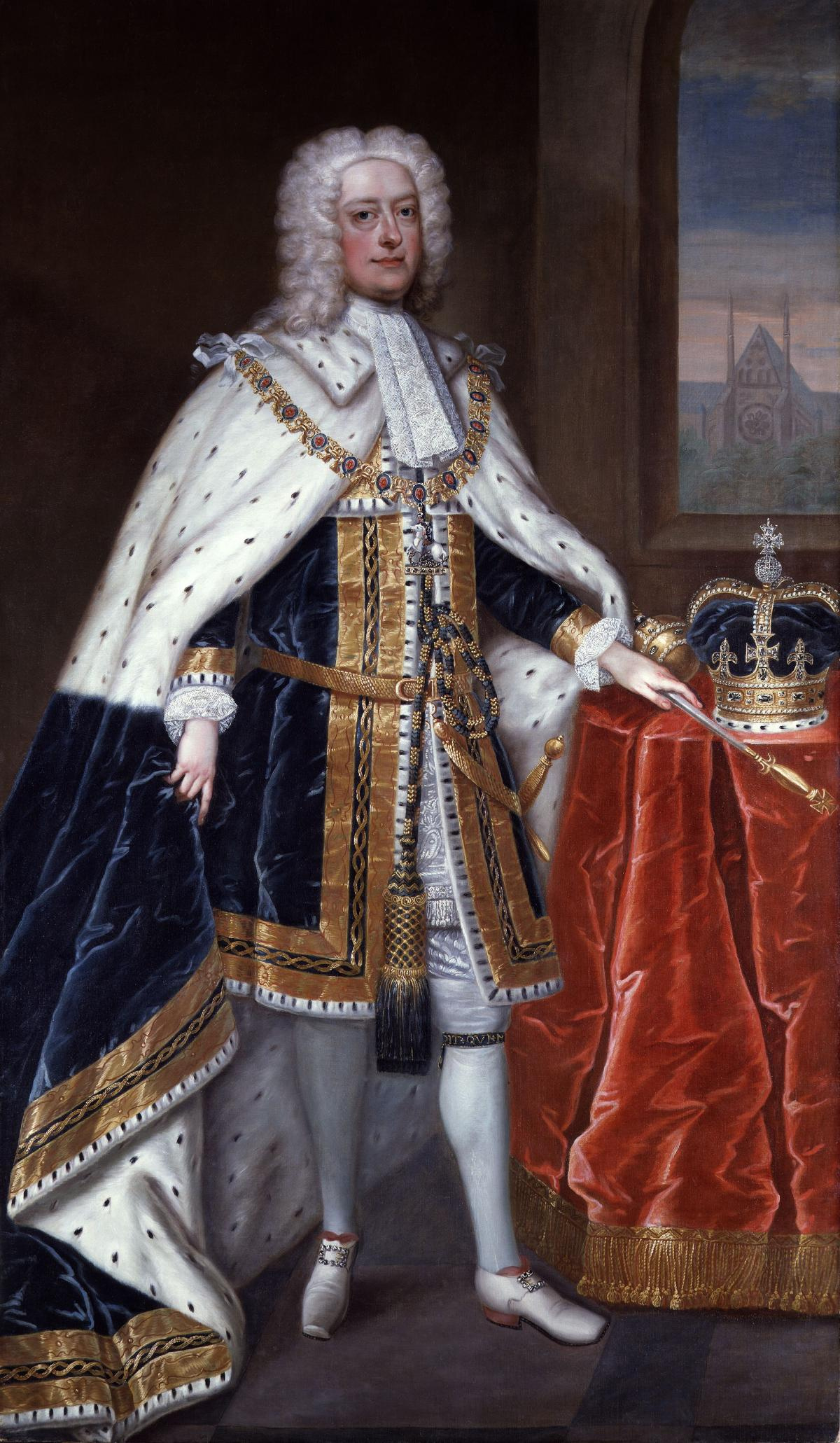
George II

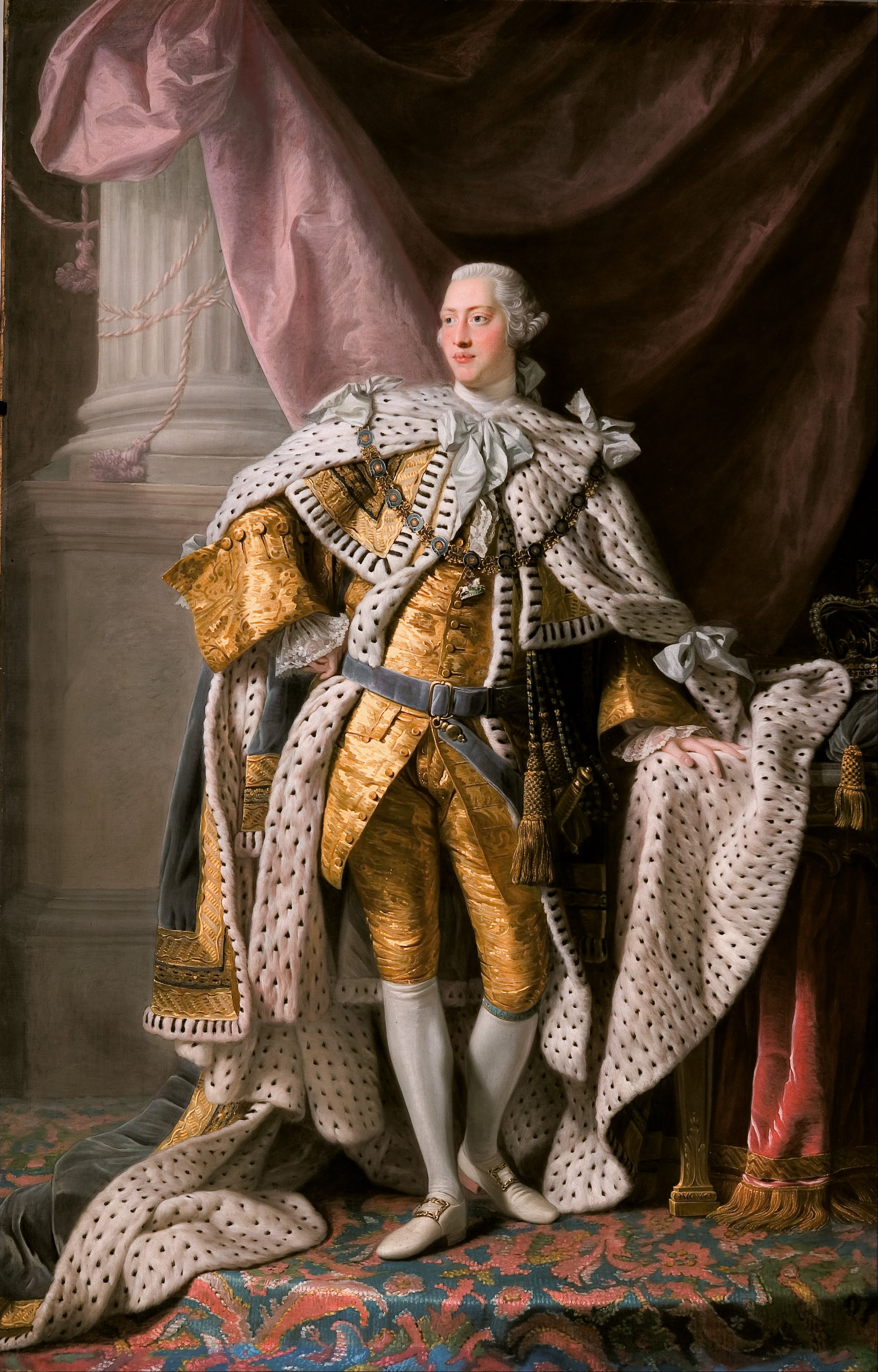
George III

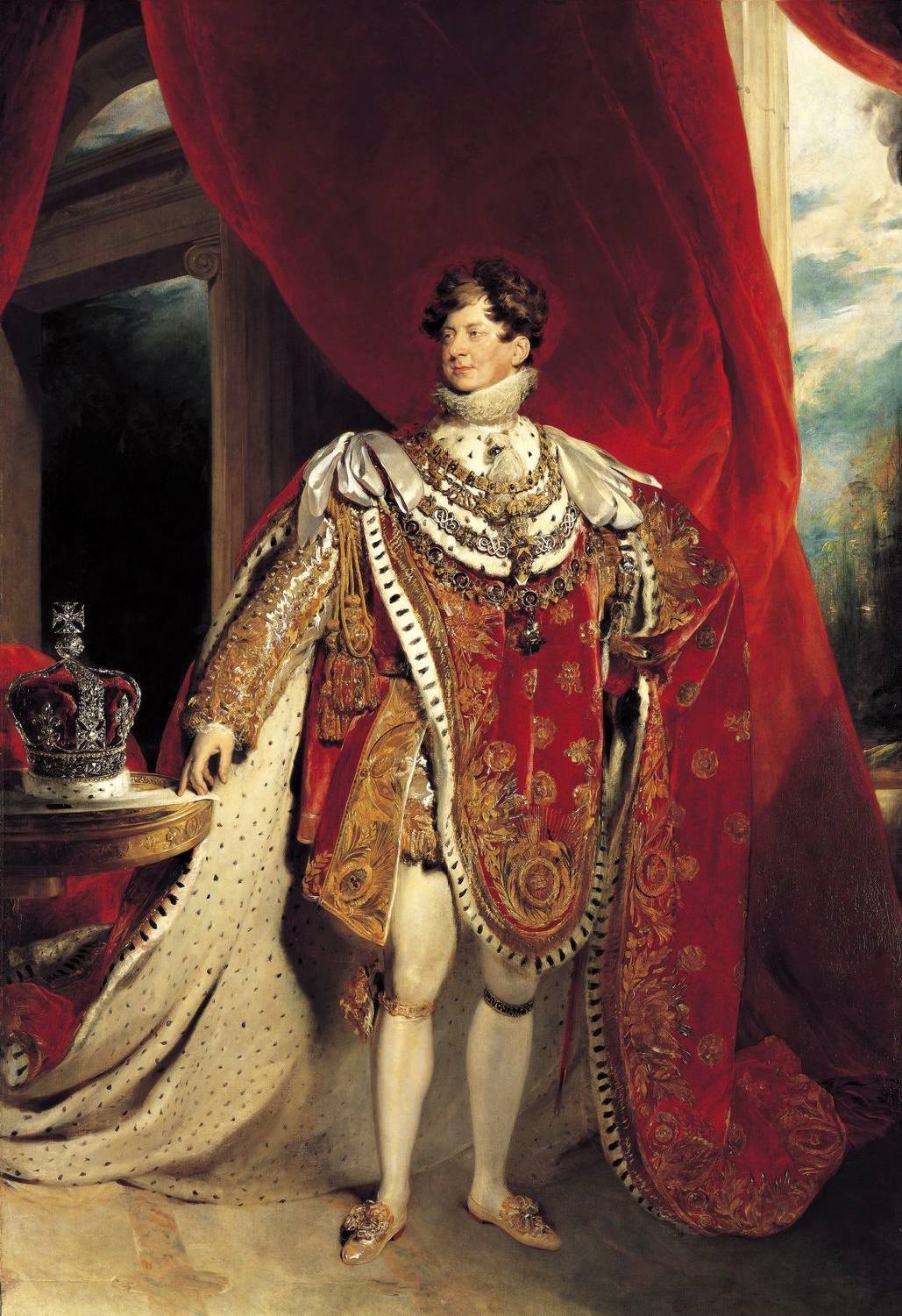
George IV

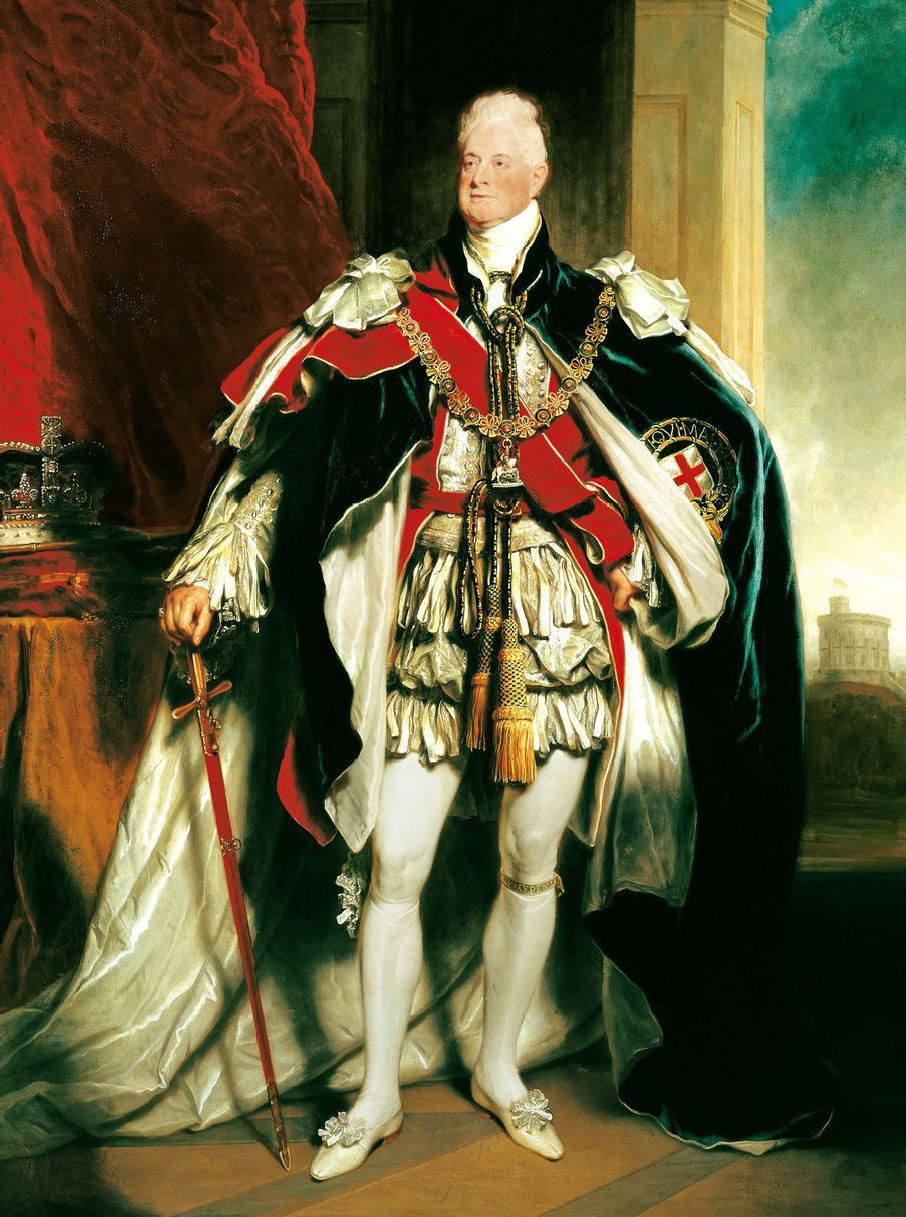
William IV

== See also ==
- Bloody Code
- Early modern Britain
- Historiography of the British Empire
- Historiography of the United Kingdom
- International relations 1648–1814
- The Georgian Group

== Bibliography ==
- Andress, David (2012). The savage storm: Britain on the brink in the age of Napoleon. London: Little Brown. ISBN 9781405513210.
- Armstrong, Anthony (1973). The Church of England: the Methodists and society, 1700–1850. London: University of London Press. ISBN 9780340170564.
- Bannister, Jerry, Liam Riordan (2012). The Loyal Atlantic: Remaking the British Atlantic in the Revolutionary Era. Toronto: University of Toronto Press. ISBN 9781442661134.
- Bates, Stephen (2015). Year of Waterloo: Britain in 1815. London: Head of Zeus. ISBN 9781781858233.
- Begiato, Joanne (2016). Between poise and power: embodied manliness in eighteenth-and nineteenth-century British culture. Transactions of the Royal Historical Society. Vol. 26.
- Black, Jeremy. (2003) (2003). "Georges I & II: Limited monarchs". History Today. 53 (2).
- Black Jeremy, ed. (1984) Britain in the Age of Walpole. Nine specialized essays by experts In politics economics, foreign policy & poetry
- Black, Jeremy (2004). The Hanoverians: The History of a Dynasty. London: Hambledon Continuum. p. 288. ISBN 9781474210287. online
- Black, Jeremy (1984). Britain in the Age of Walpole. London: Macmillan. ISBN 978-0-333-36863-3.
- Briggs, Asa (1959). The making of modern England, 1783–1867: The age of improvement. London: Longman. OCLC 9106361. online; a major scholarly survey.
- Bultmann, William A. (1963). "Early Hanoverian England (1714–60): Some Recent Writings". Journal of Modern History. 35 (1): 46–61. doi:10.1086/243597. JSTOR 1899144.
- Colley, Linda, (1992) Britons: forging the nation, 1707-1837 (Yale UP) online; a major scholarly survey.
- Curl, James Stevens (2011). Georgian Architecture. London: English Heritage. ISBN 9781848020863.
- Dixon, Nicholas (2010). "From Georgian to Victorian". History Review (68).; Historyography.
- Ellis, Joyce (2001). The Georgian Town, 1680–1840. Basingstoke: Palgrave. ISBN 9780333711347.
- Evans, E. J. (1989). Britain before the Reform Act: politics and society 1815–1832. London: Routledge. ISBN 9781315841304.
- Fry, Roger, and James Bolivar Manson, eds. (1929) Georgian Art (1760-1820): An Introductory Review of English Painting, Architecture, Sculpture, Ceramics, Glass, Metalwork, Furniture, Textiles and Other Arts During the Reign of George III. online
- Gould, Eliga H. (1997). "American independence and Britain's counter-revolution". Past & Present (154): 107–141. doi:10.1093/past/154.1.107.
- Gregg, Pauline (1967). A Social and Economic History of Britain: 1760–1950. New York: Pegasus. OCLC 1976542.
- Graham Cummings, A. J., and Jack Fruchtman, eds. (1997). Britain in the Hanoverian Age, 1714–1837: An Encyclopedia (Taylor & Francis)
- Hill, B.W. (1985) British parliamentary parties 1742–1832.
- Hilton, Boyd. (2006) A Mad, Bad, and Dangerous People? England, 1783 –1846. (Oxford UP); a major scholarly survey.
- Hochschild, Adam (2005). Bury the Chains, The British Struggle to Abolish Slavery. Basingstoke: Pan Macmillan. ISBN 9780330485814.
- Holmes, Richard (2009). The Age of Wonder: How the Romantic Generation Discovered the Beauty and Terror of Science. London: HarperPress. ISBN 9780007441358.
- Hunt, Tamara L. (2017). Defining John Bull: political caricature and national identity in late Georgian England. London: Taylor & Francis. ISBN 9781840142686.
- Marshall, Dorothy. (1962) Eighteenth Century England
- Mokyr, Joel (2010). The Enlightened Economy: An Economic History of Britain 1700–1850. New Haven: Yale University Press. ISBN 9780300189513.
- Mori, Jennifer (2014). Britain in the Age of the French Revolution: 1785–1820. Routledge.
- Newman, Gerald, ed. (1997). Britain in the Hanoverian Age, 1714–1837: An Encyclopedia. London: Taylor & Francis. ISBN 978-0-8153-0396-1.
- O'Brien, Patrick K. (1988). "The political economy of British taxation, 1660-1815". Economic History Review. 41 (1): 1–32. doi:10.2307/2597330. JSTOR 2597330.
- O'Gorman, Frank (1986). "The Recent Historiography of the Hanoverian Regime". Historical Journal. 29 (4): 1005–1020. doi:10.1017/S0018246X00019178. JSTOR 2639368.
- Owen, John B. (1974) The eighteenth century, 1714-1815 online
- Parsons, Timothy H. (2019). The British imperial century, 1815–1914: A world history perspective. Rowman & Littlefield.
- Plumb, John H. (1956). The First Four Georges online
- Plumb, J. H. (1974). The First Four Georges.
- Porter, Roy (1991). English Society in the Eighteenth Century. [English Society in the Eighteenth Century. online]
- Priestley, J.B. (1969) The Prince of Pleasure and his Regency. 1811–20, heavily illustrated coverage of the 1810s; online
- Pryde, E. B., ed. (1996). Handbook of British Chronology. Cambridge University Press. pp. 46–47. ISBN 978-0-521-56350-5.
- Reed, Michael. (1983) The Georgian Triumph, 1700–1830; emphasis on the environment; online
- Reitan E. A., ed. (1964). 'George III, Tyrant Or Constitutional Monarch?.
- Rendell, Mike (2018). Trailblazing Women of the Georgian Era: The Eighteenth-Century Struggle for Female Success in a Man's World. Pen and Sword.
- Royle, Edward, and James Walvin (1982). English radicals and reformers, 1760–1848. University Press of Kentucky.
- Rule. John (1992). Albion's People: English Society 1714–1815.
- Schweizer, Karl, Jeremy Black (1989). Politics and the Press in Hanoverian Britain. E. Mellon Press.
- Simms, Brendan (2007). Three Victories and a Defeat: The Rise and Fall of the First British Empire, 1714-1783. London: Allen Lane. ISBN 978-0-713-99426-1.
- Simms, Brendan, Torsten Riotte (2009). The Hanoverian Dimension in British History, 1714–1837. Cambridge University Press. ISBN 978-0-521-84222-8.
- Snyder, Henry L. (1984). Richard Schlatter (ed.). Early Georgian England. Recent Views on British History: Essays on Historical Writing since 1966.; Historiography.
- Thomas, Peter D. G. (1985). "George III and the American Revolution". History. 70 (228): 16–31. doi:10.1111/j.1468-229X.1985.tb02477.x.
- Trevelyan, G.M. (1901). British History in the Nineteenth Century (1782–1901).; online
- Turner, M. J. (2000). The Age of Unease: government and reform in Britain, 1782–1832.
- Watson J. Steven (1960). The Reign of George III: 1760–1815.; A major scholarly survey. online
- Williams, Basil (1939). The Whig Supremacy 1714–1760.; A major scholarly survey. online
- Wilson, Charles (1967). England's apprenticeship, 1603–1763.
- Woodward; E. L. (1938). The Age of Reform, 1815–1870.; A major scholarly survey. online
