= Sacheverell riots =

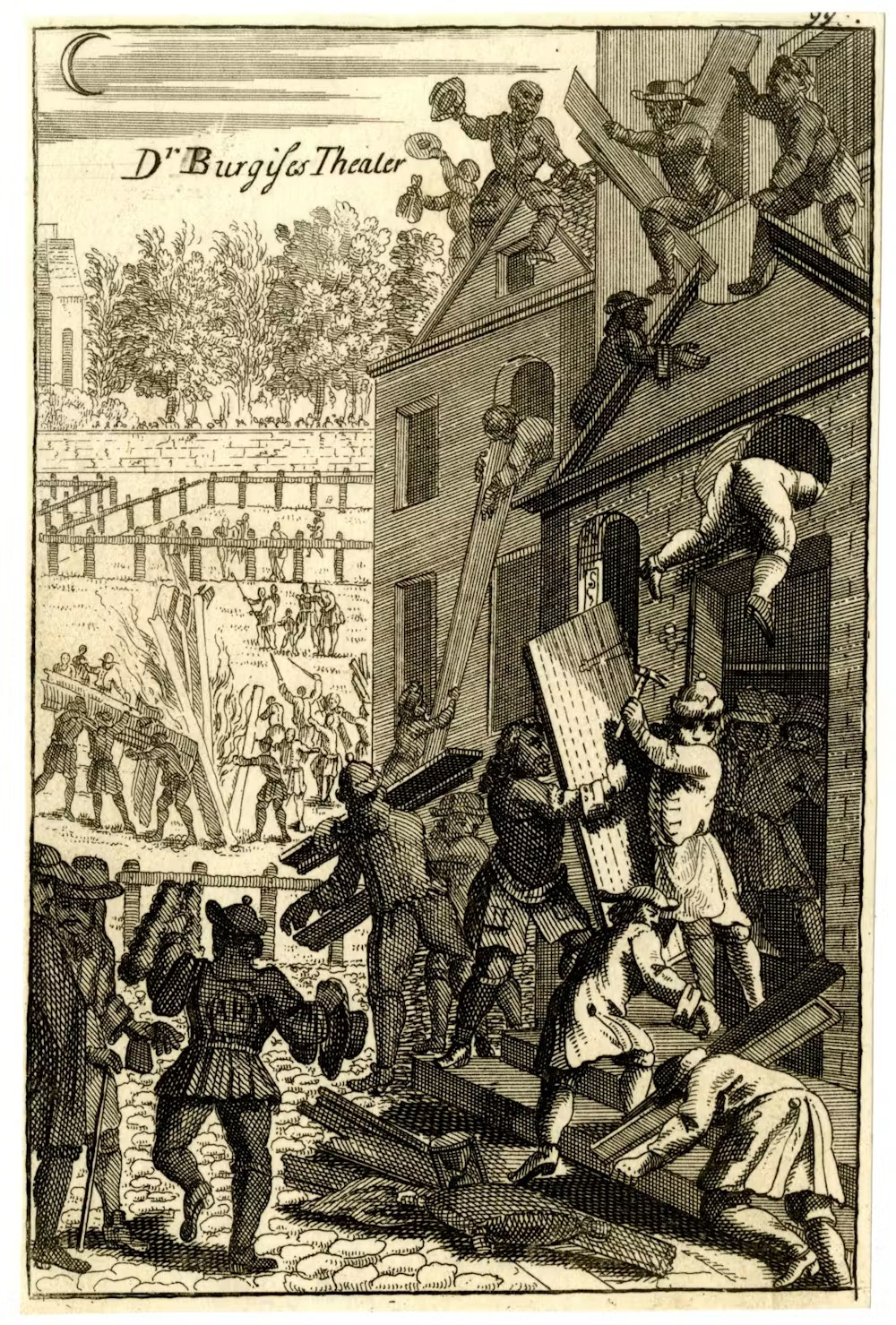
Daniel Burgess' Presbyterian meeting house on Carey Street being wrecked by a mob on 1 March 1710

The Sacheverell riots were a series of outbreaks of public disorder, which spread across England during the spring, summer and autumn of 1710 in which supporters of the Tories attacked the homes and meeting-houses of Dissenters, particularly those of Presbyterians, whose congregations tended to support the Whigs. (Further violence, again targeting Presbyterian chapels, occurred in the Coronation riots of 1714 and the Rebellion riots of 1715.) The Sacheverell and Rebellion riots are regarded as the most serious instances of public disorder of the eighteenth century, until, perhaps, the anti-Catholic protests of 1780.

The riots reflected the dissatisfaction of many Anglicans with the toleration of an increasing number of Independent, Baptist, and Presbyterian chapels, which diminished the apparent authority of the Church of England; and were a reaction to perceived grievances against the Whig government, in regard to high taxation resulting from the War of the Spanish Succession, the recent sudden influx of some 10,000 Calvinist refugees from Germany, and the growth of the merchant classes, the so-called "monied interest".

== Causes ==
The riots were a response to the prosecution of Henry Sacheverell. Sacheverell was a high church Tory Anglican who had preached two sermons that described what he saw as threats to the Church of England. The threat from Catholics was dealt with in three minutes; but the rest of the one-and-a-half-hour sermon was an attack on Nonconformists and the "false brethren" who aided them in menacing Church and State. His target was the Whig party. His sermons brought to the fore the tensions that existed between Whig and Tory across the country at that time.

Sacheverell was tried by the House of Lords at Whig instigation, accused of preaching against the Glorious Revolution of 1688. The House found that his sermons should be publicly burned and he should be banned from preaching for three years. This made him a martyr in the eyes of many Tory supporters, and triggered the riots.

== Riots ==
Rioting broke out in London. On the evening of 1 March, protestors attacked an elegant Presbyterian meeting-house in Lincoln's Inn Fields, built only five years earlier. They smashed the windows, stripped the tiles from the roof and ripped out its interior wooden fittings, which they made into a bonfire. The crowd then marauded through much of the West End of London chanting "High Church and Sacheverell" .

It spread across the country, notably in Wrexham, Barnstaple and Gainsborough, Lincolnshire, where Presbyterian meeting-houses were attacked, with many being burnt to the ground. The Sacheverell riots, and further disturbances in 1714 and 1715, led to the passing of the Riot Act.

== Bibliography ==
- Hughson, David (1805). London: being an accurate history and description of the British metropolis. Printed by W. Stratford ..., for J. Stratford. pp. 320–321. "Daniel Burgess's Presbyterian meeting-house in Carey Street, London."
