= Daniel Burgess (minister) =

English Presbyterian minister

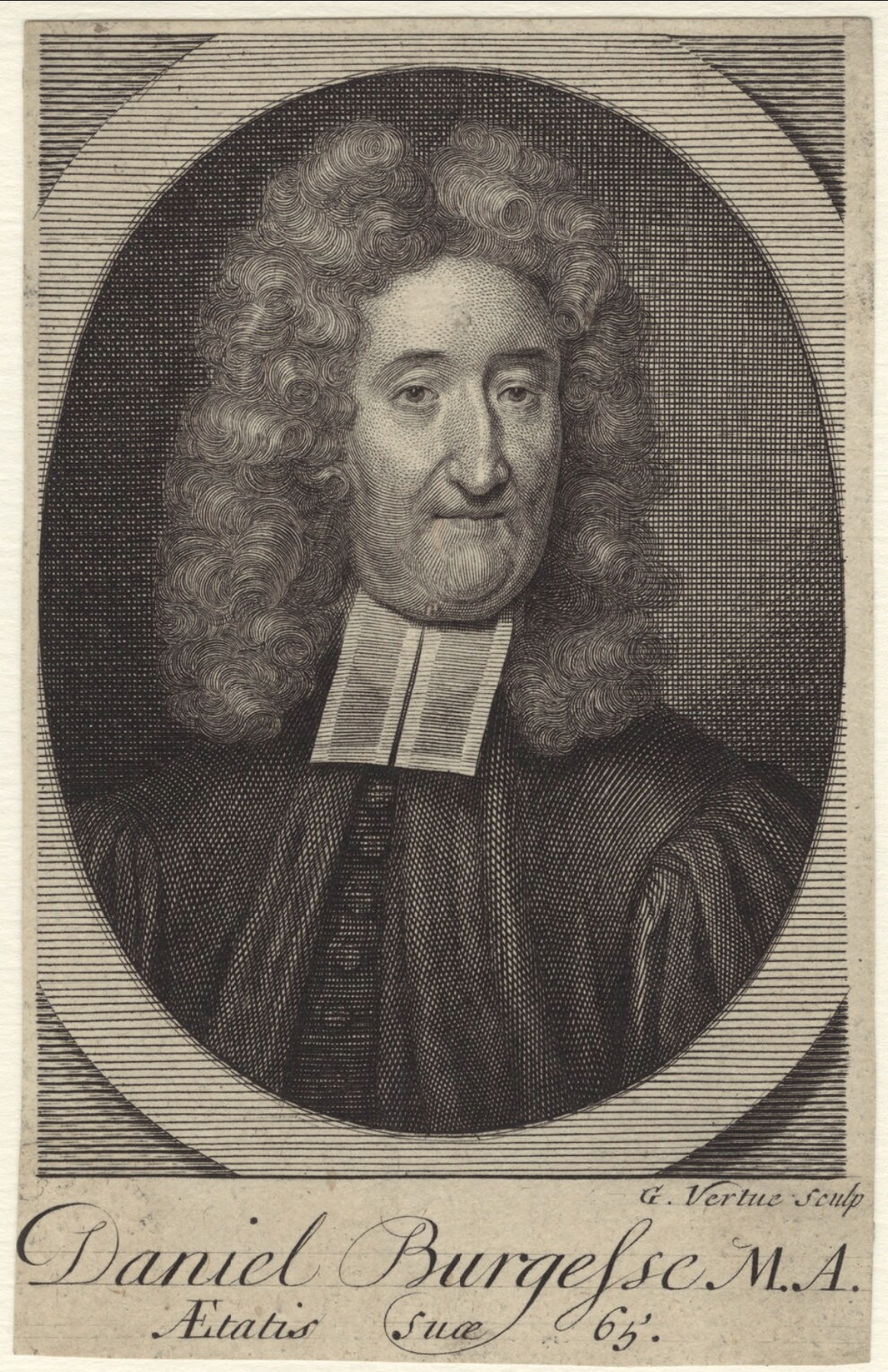
- Portrait by George Vertue, 1714
- Born: 1645
- Died: 1713 (aged 67–68)
- Occupation: Presbyterian minister

Daniel Burgess (1645–1713) was an English Presbyterian minister.

== Life ==
Daniel Burgess was born at Staines, Middlesex, in 1645.

His father was Daniel Burgess, who, after holding the livings of Staines and of Sutton Magna, Wiltshire, was appointed rector of Collingbourn Ducis, Wiltshire, through the influence of his brother Isaac Burgess, High Sheriff of the county. He was ejected from the rectory in 1662, and was probably the author of the sermon on Eccl. xii. 1, mentioned by Watts and Allibone.

Burgess was placed under Richard Busby at Westminster School in 1654, and entered commoner of Magdalen Hall, Oxford, in 1660. He studied hard, but did not graduate, declining to conform. The statement that he took orders at Oxford needs confirmation; deacon's orders he may have had, but more probably only the license of a presbytery.

Leaving the university, he acted as domestic chaplain to Foyl of Chute, Wiltshire, and afterwards to Smith of Tedworth.

In 1667, Roger Boyle, 1st Earl of Orrery, lord president of Munster, took him to Ireland. He remained there for seven years. He was headmaster of the school founded by Lord Orrery at Charleville, co. Cork, and had pupils from the Irish nobility and gentry. He afterwards acted as chaplain to Lady Mervin, near Dublin. He was ordained by the Dublin presbytery. At Dublin he married.

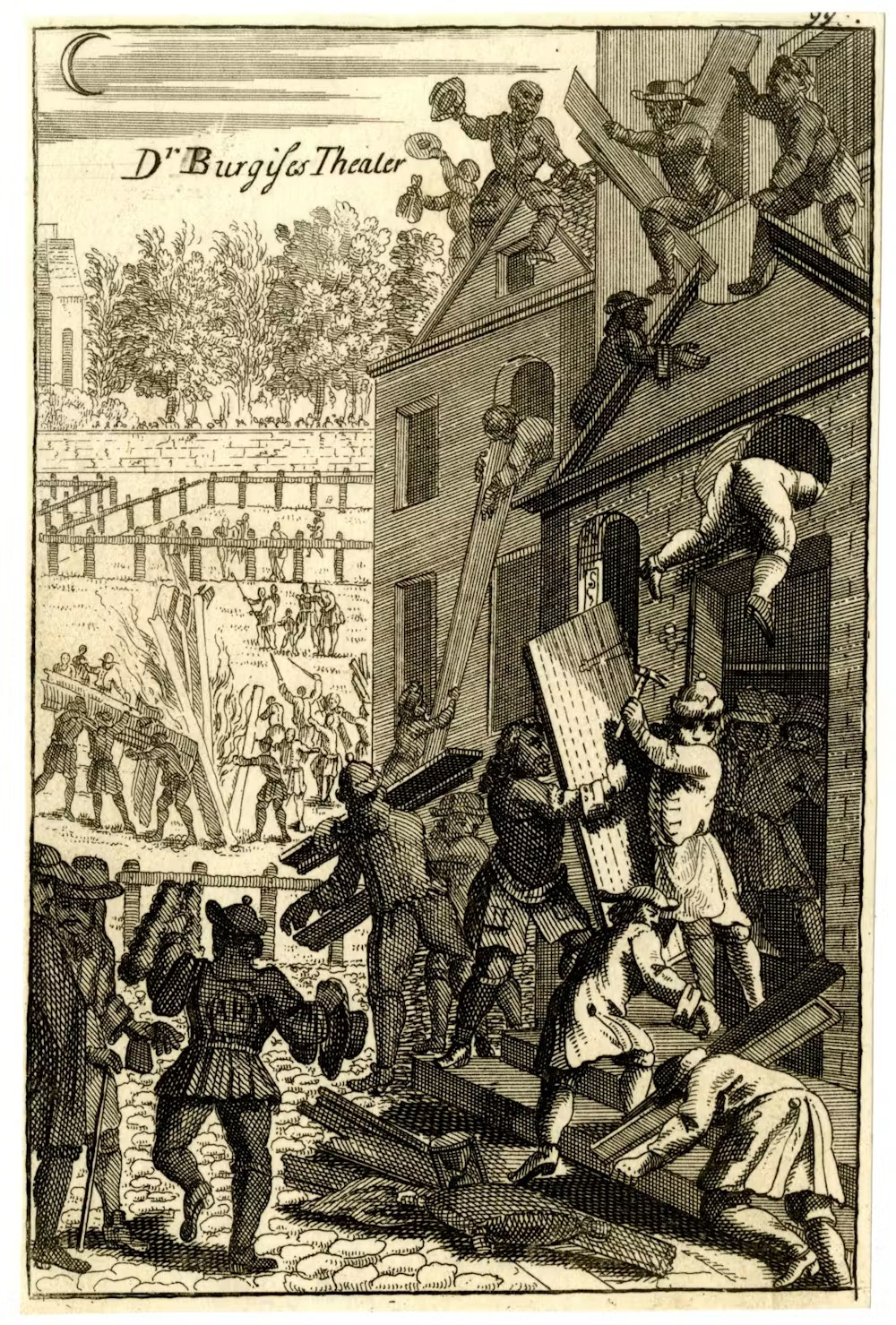
Burgess's Presbyterian meeting house on Carey Street being wrecked by a mob on 1 March 1710

In 1674, his father's state of health took him to Marlborough; he preached there and in the neighbourhood, and was sent to Marlborough jail.

He came to London in his fortieth year (1685), and ministered to a large congregation at a hired meeting-place in Brydges Street, Covent Garden. He had influential friends; the Countess of Warwick chose him as tutor for her grandson, the future Lord Bolingbroke; in July 1688 Rotheram, one of the new barons of exchequer, took him as his chaplain on the Oxford circuit, and in 1695 he preached the funeral sermon for the Countess of Ranelagh.

His congregation moved in 1695 to a meeting-house in Russell Court, Drury Lane, and in 1705 a meeting-house was built for him in New Court, Carey Street, Lincoln's Inn Fields. Before it was paid for, differences arose in his congregation, ending in a large secession from his ministry. On 1 March 1710 the Henry Sacheverell mob gutted Burgess's meeting-house, and made a bonfire of its pulpit and other fittings. The government offered a reward of £100 for the apprehension of the rioters, and repaired the building.

Burgess's fame as a preacher was great, and his exuberant animation was something new in the London pulpit. He was a conspicuous example of pith and vivacity at a time when a dry dignity was beginning to be exacted of preachers as a virtue. Jonathan Swift, who admits his ability, unjustly taxes him with mixing unction with "incoherence and ribaldry". Tom Brown, who takes his Indian to Russell Court, deals chiefly with the congregation, but his hint of Burgess's "pop-gun way of delivery" is in harmony with his style of composition. It is full of epigram, terse, quaint, clear, and never meaningless or dull. Caulfield reproduces a curious contemporary print of Burgess and his congregation. Among current stories of his pulpit wit, the best is that which makes him say that the Jews were called Israelites because God did not choose that his people should be called Jacobites.

His discourse on Foolish Talking and Jesting described and condemned, is of moment in view of his own practice and repute. Briefly, he contends that "no jesting is lawful but what is medicinal, and restorative of spirits for nobler thoughts". In theology, he was Calvinistical.

Burgess's last years were damped by the defection from his flock and by sickness. "If I must be idle", he said, "I had rather be idle under ground than idle above ground." He died on 26 January 1713, and was buried on 31 January, in the church of St Clement Danes. Matthew Henry preached his funeral sermon.

== Works ==
Of Burgess's publications Bogue and Bennett give, after Henry, an imperfect list of 32 without dates, beginning with Soliloquies, which he printed in Ireland, and ending with a Latin defence of nonconformity, Appellatio ad Fratres exteros. Among his works are:

- A Call to Sinners, 1689, written at the request of Baron Rotheram, for the use of condemned criminals.
- Seasonable Words for English Protestants, 1690.
- Advice to parents and children, 1690
- The Characters of a Godly Man, 1691
- Eighteen Directions for Saving Conversion to God, 1691
- The Death and Rest, Resurrection and blessed Portion of the Saints (Dan. xii. 13), 1692
- A Discourse of the Death and Resurrection of good Men's Bodies, 1692
- The Confirming Work of Religion, 1693
- The Sure Way to Wealth ... evenwhile Taxes rise and Trades sink, 1693.
- Rules for hearing the Word of God, 2nd ed. 1693.
- The church’s triumph over death, 1694
- Holy Union and Holy Contention, 1695
- Rules and Motives to Holy Prayer, 1696
- Causa Dei; or Counsel to the Rich, 1697
- The Golden Snuffers [Ex. xxxvii. 23], 1697
- Directions for Daily Holy Living
- The Blessed God

== Family ==
His son, Daniel Burgess (died 1747), was secretary to Caroline of Ansbach, Princess of Wales, and in 1723 obtained a regium donum or government grant of 500 half-yearly for dissenting ministers.
