= 1715 England riots =

1715 series of riots in England

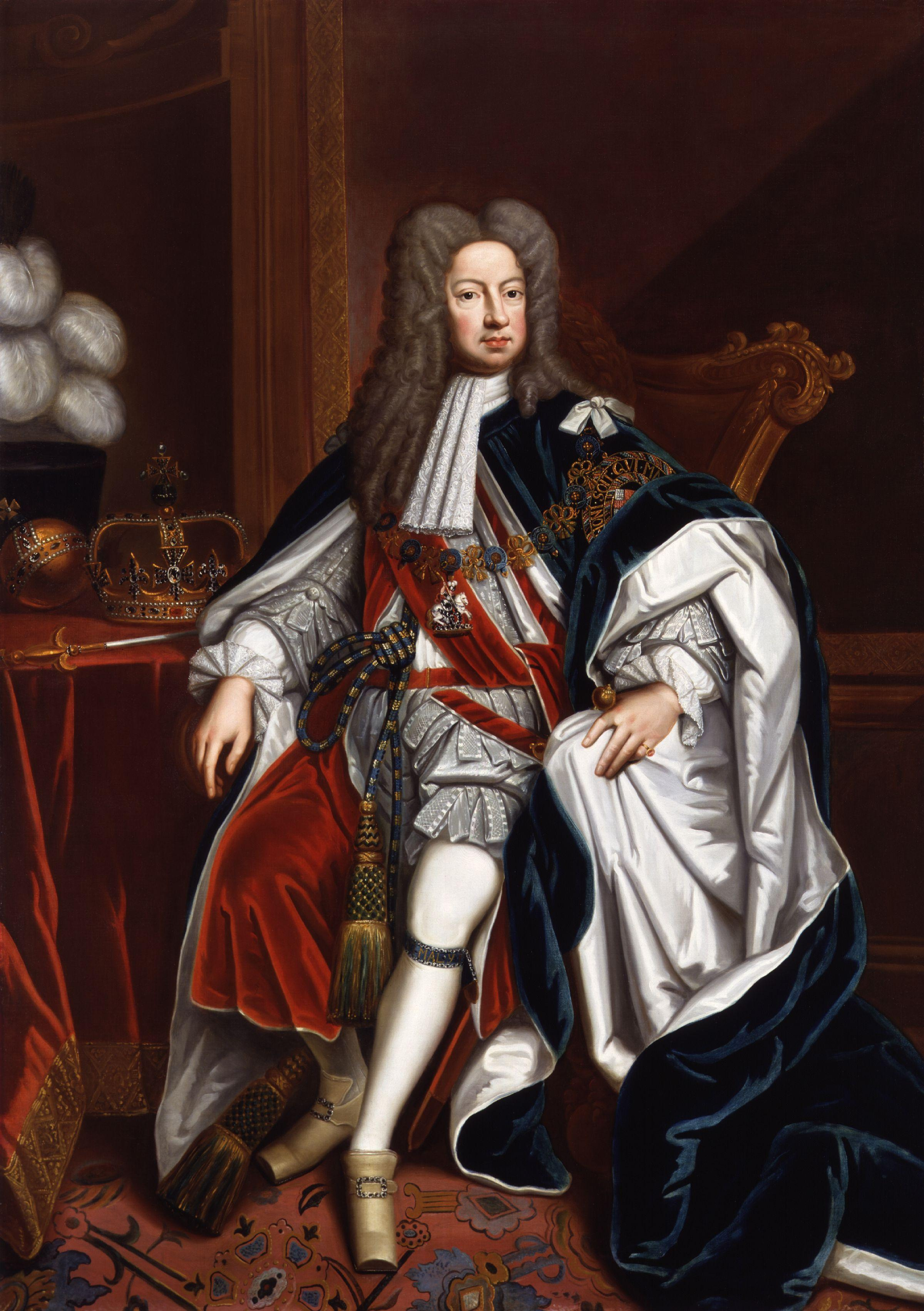
King George I by Sir Godfrey Kneller, c. 1714.

In the spring and summer of 1715 a series of riots occurred in England in which High Church mobs attacked over forty Dissenting meeting-houses. The rioters also protested against the first Hanoverian king of Britain, George I and his new Whig government (the Whigs were associated with the Dissenters). The riots occurred on symbolic days: 28 May was George I's birthday, 29 May was the anniversary of Charles II's Restoration and 10 June was the birthday of the Jacobite Pretender, James Francis Edward Stuart.

== Background ==
Upon the death in August 1714 of the last Stuart monarch, Queen Anne, Georg Ludwig, Elector of Hanover, ascended the throne in accordance with the terms of the Act of Settlement 1701 that excluded Anne's half-brother James Francis Edward Stuart. After his arrival in Britain in September, George promptly dismissed the Tories from office and appointed a Whig-dominated government. His coronation in October led to rioting in over twenty towns in England. The 1715 general election was also accompanied by riots and resulted in a Whig majority in the House of Commons and the proscription of the Tories from office, with some former Tory ministers being impeached by the new government.

According to Nicholas Rogers, the High Church clergy of the Church of England played a role in fomenting discontent: they were "by reputation the progenitors of mob violence" and after George's accession the "high-flying clergy strove desperately to revive the flagging fortunes of their party, mobilising their congregations in defence of the Anglican inheritance and warning them of the dangers of Whig rule". The Whig writer Daniel Defoe complained that the pulpit had become "a Trumpet of Sedition".

== Riots ==
The anniversary of Queen Anne's accession day and William III's death, 8 March, was met in London with bell-ringing, flag-waving and closed shops. On 23 April, the anniversary of Anne's coronation, a mob met at Snow Hill and made a bonfire under a banner depicting Anne and emblazoned with the words: “Imitate her who was so Just and Good, / Both in her Actions and her Royal Word” (the latter may have hinted at her supposed promise to restore James Stuart to the throne). Near St Andrew's, Holborn, the mob burned a picture of William III and broke windows which were not illuminated in celebration. Referring to the 1710 Sacheverell riots, they also proposed "to sing the Second Part of the Sacheverell-Tune by pulling down [Dissenting] Meeting Houses" but they were persuaded not to do so.

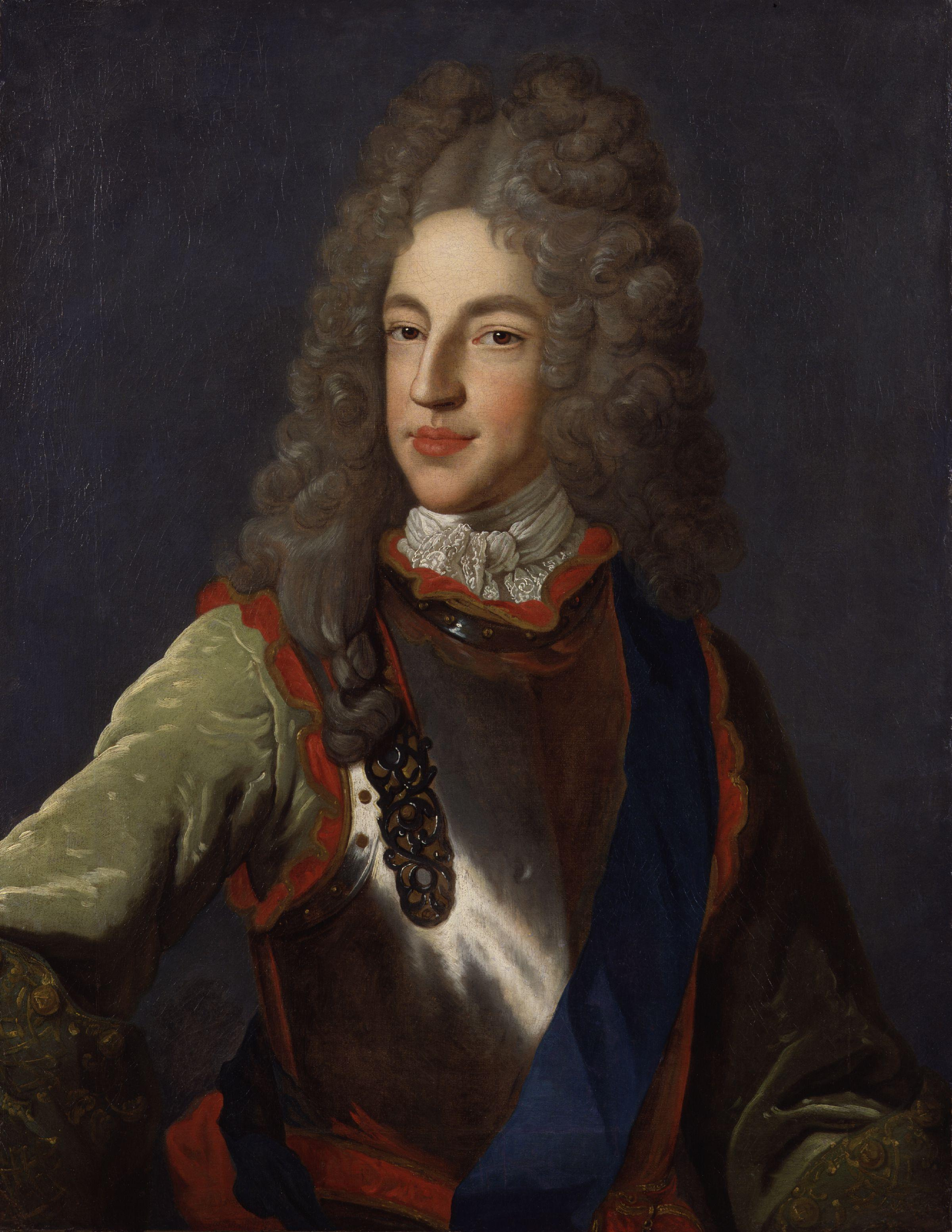
James Francis Edward Stuart by Alexis Simon Belle.

The first riots happened in London during the impeachment trials of Tory politicians. On 29 April the birthday of the Tory peer the Duke of Ormonde was riotously celebrated in Drury Lane and west London.

On George I's birthday, 28 May, there occurred large demonstrations in Smithfield, Cheapside and Highgate, where the Dissenting chapel was attacked. In Smithfield, according to Abel Boyer, "a large mob burnt Cromwell (some say Hoadly) in effigy". In Cheapside the rioters shouted “No Hanoverian, No Presbiterian government”. The next day was Restoration Day and the mob shouted: “A Restoration, a Stewart, High Church and Ormonde”, “A Stewart, a second Restoration” and “No King George, King James the third”. When a coachman called for King James he "was hollowed through the Mob" and supporters of the Whigs had their windows broken. In Queen Street a battle occurred between the rioters and the trained bands. At the London Stock Exchange the crowd shouted “High Church and the Duke of Ormonde”. Stock jobbing was seen as the parasitical and immoral growth from Whig principles. When one passer-by shouted “Long live King George” he was beaten up by the mob.

In Oxford on 28 May a rumour spread that Queen Anne, Lord Bolingbroke, Ormonde and Henry Sacheverell were to be burned in effigy. In response, undergraduates and townsfolk attacked those celebrating George's birthday and broke into the Presbyterian meeting-house and made a bonfire of its pulpit, pews and window, with an effigy of its minister. The mob chanted “An Ormond, an Ormond, a Bolingbroke, down with the Roundheads, no Constitutioners [members of the Whig Constitutional Club], no Hanover; a new Restoration”. The next day a Quaker and Baptist meeting place was also attacked.

On 10 June Anglican churches in Clerkenwell and St Dunstan-in-the-West rang their bells to celebrate James Stuart's birthday, a Dissenting meeting place in Blackfriars was gutted by the mob, and James's declaration was nailed to the door of the former Dissenting chapel in Lincoln's Inn Fields (which had been destroyed five years previously during the Sacheverell riots). Similar disturbances on James's birthday occurred at Cambridge, Leeds and several Somersetshire villages; in Norton St Philip near Bath James was proclaimed king. At Frome the mob was reluctantly persuaded not to destroy the local Dissenting chapel. At Marlborough, Wiltshire the mob broke into the church and rang the bells, despite objections from the parson.

In the Midlands in late June and early August, similar riots against Dissenters took place, starting in Wolverhampton during St. Peter's fair and ending at Kingswinford in Worcestershire on 1 August. In Wolverhampton a buckle maker was heard shouting “God damn King George, and the Duke of Marlborough” and a suspected spy was forced by the mob to get on his knees and bless King James III. Robert Holland of Bilston urged the mob: “Now boys goe on we will have no King but James the third & he will be here in a month and wee will drive the old Rogue into his Country again to sow Turnipps”. Similar expressions of loyalty to James were heard in Walsall and Leek.

In July, two meeting-houses were attacked in Birmingham. On Sunday 17 July 1715, a mob attacked a Presbyterian meeting-house in Dark lane, Hollywood in Wythall Parish, setting fire to the building. Three men were arrested and tried at Worcester. Two were convicted of damage to property and sentenced to public whipping. The third, Francis Daulkes, was found guilty of arson, and hanged at Red Hill, Worcester; his tar-painted body was hung in a cage opposite the chapel he had torched. When the Presbyterian chapel was rebuilt, it became known locally as Daulkes’s chapel.

In Warrington on 10 June bells were rung and the mob shouted “Down with the Rump”. However they were prevented from attacking a Dissenting meeting house. In Leeds a bonfire was made and a man was later indicted for threatening a Dissenting meeting place.

In Manchester in early May James Stuart had been proclaimed James III. Between 28 May and 23 June there was a spate of rioting, with the Dissenting chapel in Cross Street ransacked and destroyed between 1 June and 30 July. The historian Paul Monod said "[t]his methodical destruction must have passed on to Dissenters the chilling message that the Manchester Jacobite crowd wanted their presence totally extinguished. ... It was a violent call for a return to the [religious] uniformity of Charles II's reign". Lord Cobham's dragoons eventually restored order but the rioting had by then spread to Monton and Houghton, where Dissenting chapels were attacked on 13 June. A week later the Dissenting chapels in Blackley, Greenacres, Failsworth and Standing were attacked and by 25 June the Dissenting chapels in Pilkington and Wigan had been attacked.

In the West Midlands and Lancashire over thirty Dissenting chapels were attacked. In Shrewsbury during the riots a paper was posted:

We Gentlemen of the Loyal Mob of Shrewsbury, do issue out this Proclamation to all Dissenters from the Church of England, of what Kind or Denomination soever, whether Independent, Baptists or Quakers: If you, or any of you, do encourage or suffer any of that damnable Faction called Presbyterians, to assemble themselves amongst you, in any of your Conventicles, at the time of Divine Worship, you may expect to meet with the same that they have been treated with. Given under our Hands and Seals the 11th Day of July 1715. God save the King.

Paul Monod has said that the hostility shown towards the Dissenters, especially Presbyterians, was astonishing and that "[p]opular Tory rage...centred on religious rather than secular objects – in particular, on the hated meeting-houses". He argues that plebeian English people were attached to the Church of England because it embodied a myth of unity and they feared Hanoverian–Whig rule would return England to the rule of Puritans between 1649–1660, when the Church of England had been abolished.

== Aftermath ==
Around 500 people were arrested for rioting in Shropshire, Staffordshire and Worcestershire with around 2,000 people taking part in the riots in these counties with several hundred more in Birmingham.

In response to these riots, the new Whig majority passed the Riot Act to put down disturbances. This law strengthened magistrates powers and allowed Justices of the Peace to disperse demonstrations without fear of prosecution.

In September and early October the government arrested the leading Tories in fear of a Jacobite rising. The Jacobite rising of 1715 resulted in failure.

== See also ==
- Coronation riots
