= Elding =

Elding is a surname. Notable people with the surname include:

- Anthony Elding (born 1982), English footballer and coach
- Owen Elding (born 2006), Irish footballer
- Read Elding, British governor of Bahamas

== See also ==
- Elling (name)
