= Elling (disambiguation) =

Elling is a 2001 Norwegian film directed by Petter Næss.

Elling may also refer to:

- Elling, Denmark
- Elling (play), a 2007 British play based on the film
- Elling (name)

== See also ==
- Elling Woman, a naturally mummified Danish bog body discovered in 1938
