= George Sandford =

George Sandford may refer to:

- George Sandford (British politician) (1821–1879)
- George Sandford, 3rd Baron Mount Sandford (1756–1846), Irish politician
- George Sandford (footballer) (1872–1940), Australian rules footballer
- Sir George Sandford (colonial administrator) (1892–1950), British colonial administrator
