= Gertrude Carter =

American-born artist and architect

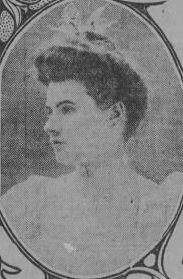
- 1905
- Born: Gertrude Codman Parker; February 6, 1875; Boston, Massachusetts
- Died: November 12, 1953 (aged 78); Boston, Massachusetts
- Other names: Gertrude Codman Carter, Lady Gertrude Codman Gilbert-Carter
- Occupation: artist
- Known for: First Lady of Barbados 1904–1910
- Notable work: Queen's Park and Ilaro Court, Bridgetown, Barbados

Gertrude Carter, who was also known as Lady Gilbert-Carter (February 6, 1875 – November 12, 1953) was an American-born artist and architect who signed her works as either Gertrude Codman Parker, Gertrude Carter, or Gertrude Codman Carter. Upon her 1903 marriage, she became a British citizen and wife of the Governor of the Bahamas. Within a year, her husband was appointed as Governor of Barbados, and she moved with him to Bridgetown. Immediately becoming involved in the local community, she designed a stamp for the 300th anniversary of the annexation of Barbados by Great Britain.

Though Carter continued to produce art, she became more known for her designs of gardens and homes. Carter designed the garden at Queen's Park, as well as several other landmarks. The couple's home, Ilaro Court was designed and built upon her plans and later became the official residence of the Prime Minister of Barbados. A feminist, she established the Women's Self Help Association to assist women in earning their own income and fought for their right to vote. Traveling world-wide frequently, she maintained her home in Barbados until her death.

== Early life ==
Gertrude Codman Parker was born on February 6, 1875, in Boston, Massachusetts as the only child of Mary (née Codman) and Francis Vose Parker. On her father's side, she descended from Abraham Parker, who settled in America in 1644 and Richard Russell, treasurer of the Massachusetts Bay Colony. She also had roots in Barbados through Nathaniel Kingsland. Her father was the president of the Flint and Pere Marquette Railroad and a well-known financier. Her mother was related to the Codman family, who settled the Dorchester neighborhood in Boston, including her parents Anna Gertrude (née Dey) and John Codman, a merchant and art collector; a grandfather John Codman; and a relative, John Amory Codman, the noted artist.

Parker grew up in a prominent Bostonian family which had long supported the development of the arts and was educated in private schools. She had her social debut in Boston in the 1893–1894 season and then enrolled in the School of the Museum of Fine Arts, Boston in 1895, studying under the tutelage of Philip Leslie Hale. Influenced by the Arts and Crafts movement, she studied wood engraving and was commissioned in 1900 to prepare the cover plate for The History and Development of the American Cabinet Organ, shortly before her graduation. The following year, she begin studying in Italy, reportedly studying at the Villa Medici. As women were not allowed to attend courses at the Villa Medici, it is probable that she studied at the Ecole de Nu, informally studying with others who were allowed to enroll at the Villa Medici, before returning to Boston in 1902.

In the winter of 1902, while on vacation with her parents in Nassau, Parker met the father of one of her Bostonian friends, Sir Gilbert Thomas Carter, who was the Governor of the Bahamas. After a whirlwind courtship, twenty-eight-year-old Parker, married the widowed fifty-five-year-old governor on 25 August 1903, at a ceremony held at the Church of the Advent in Boston. At the time Parker married Gilbert T. Carter, U.S. law held that she lost her American citizenship and acquired her husband's. Until the Cable Act was passed in 1922, she would not have been able to reacquire American citizenship.

== Career ==
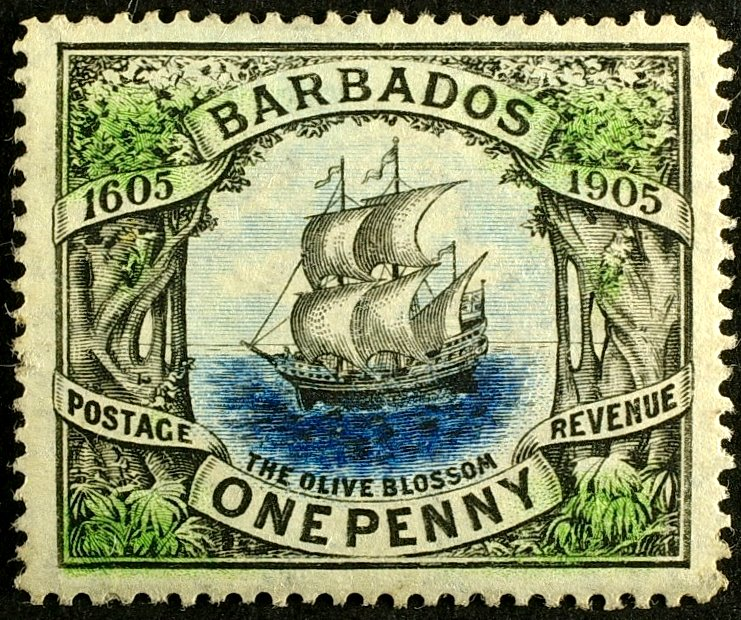
Olive Blossom 1905 issue

Immediately after their two-month honeymoon, the couple returned to Nassau, where Carter served as hostess for her husband. In 1904, Sir Gilbert-Carter was posted as the Governor and Commander-in-Chief of the Island of Barbados and its Dependencies. When the couple arrived in Bridgetown, preparations were underway for the Tercentenary of Annexation of Barbados by the British Empire and Nelson Centenary celebrations. Carter immediately submitted two stamp designs for the competition, including a bust of Nelson for the Trafalgar contest and a design of the ship Olive Blossom, which had purportedly landed in Barbados, annexing the island to Britain in 1605. While Carter's design was not selected for the Nelson bust, her design for the tercentenary stamp won and was issued in 1906.

That same year, Carter submitted designs for the garden at the Queen's Park, which were accepted and completed in 1909. She also designed the gardens for the lazaretto, the leper quarantine asylum; the Empire Theatre; and the couple's residence, Ilaro Court, now the official residence of the Prime Minister of Barbados. Finding inspiration in the tropical setting, Carter produced drawings, gouaches and watercolours, in an impressionist style, balancing light and movement with strong design elements. Her subjects depicted images of life in the busy port of Bridgetown, which she observed in her every day dealings, including scenes of the yacht club, the Chamberlain Bridge, and the Colonial Secretary's Office.

Interested in improving the lives of women, Carter was one of the founders of the Women's Self Help Association. She proposed creation of the association in 1907 to allow women to sell handicrafts and homemade foods to tourists, enabling women to have their own income. She also served as the patron of the Civic Circle, a group aimed at public beautification. Governor Gilbert Carter served as acting governor of Trinidad and Tobago as well from 1907 and then he retired in 1910. The following year, in Boston, Carter gave birth to a son, John Codman Carter, (who later went by Gilbert-Carter). Her son inspired Carter to write a book A Tropical Alphabet (ca. 1915), which was illustrated with images of things found commonly in the tropics. Carter explained in the preface that the book was written for English children living in the West Indies because most of the illustrated alphabet books used images of things like apples or foxes which were alien to them. Instead, she pictured grapefruit and other tropical items.

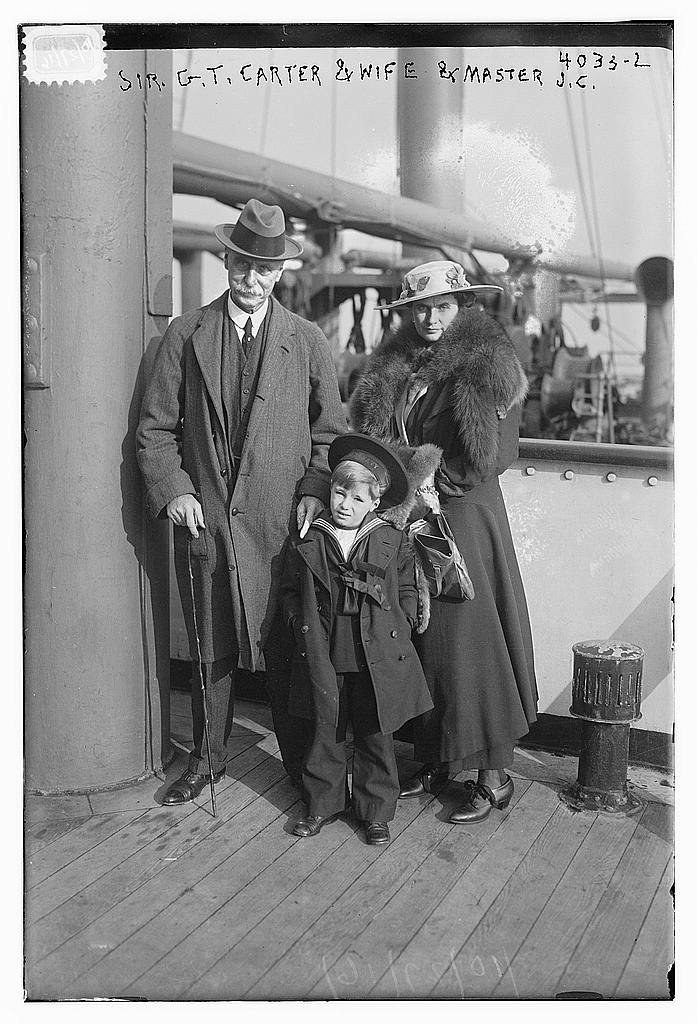
Gilbert Thomas Carter, Gertrude Carter and John Codman Carter, 1916

Between 1915 and 1920, the family made their home in Torquay, taking frequent trips back to Barbados, as well as touring Europe and visiting friends and family in Boston and New York City. During this time, Carter kept diaries recounting their daily business and extensive travel, as well as concerns over World War I. Her husband legally changed the family surname to Gilbert-Carter in 1919 and they returned to live in Ilaro and Barbados the following year. In 1924, Carter designed the Barbados exhibition hall for the British Empire Exhibition, held in Wembley. Basing her pavilion design on the historical dependence on cotton, sugar and rum and the modern development of tourism, she reproduced the Barbadian landscape in alcoves flanked with tropical orchids, palm trees, coral, conch shells, and images of blow fish and turtles. On display were pottery and other handcrafted items from the Women's Self Help Association, as well as products like cane sugar, syrup, baskets and woven rush furniture.

Sir Gilbert Carter died in Bridgetown on 18 January 1927. Carter continued to live in Barbados, traveling frequently to Boston and Palm Beach, and summering in Bar Harbor, Maine. A supporter of suffrage, she served as a representative for Barbados in London in 1929 during the National Council of Women of Great Britain’s discussion on international voting rights for women who had property and were taxpayers. Carter donated some of her artworks and other memorabilia to the Barbados Museum and Historical Society in 1952 and a special exhibition of her work was held.

== Death and legacy ==
Carter died on November 12, 1953, in Boston, Massachusetts and was buried alongside her husband at St. Michael's Cathedral in Bridgetown, Barbados. Her diaries from 1915 to 1920 are in the archives of the Massachusetts Historical Society and were serialized in 2017 in the society's blog, The Beehive.
