= Scouting and Guiding in the Bahamas =

Scouting and Guiding movement in the Bahamas

Scouting in The Bahamas began with independent local patrols and troops of Boy Scouts with the oldest of which records still exist being formed in 1912. There is also a record of Boys Brigade Scouts in the Bahamas.

In 1912, Evelyn Lobb, a Government House staff member, was instrumental in forming The 1st Bahamas Troop which was attached to the Nassau Grammar School; the 2nd Bahamas Troop (an Open Group) was attached to Queen's College; the 3rd Bahamas Troop was sponsored by St. Mathew's Church, and two Out Island Troops were also formed; the 4th Bahamas Troop on Inagua Island and the 5th Bahamas Troop on Exuma Island.

In 1913, The Boy Scouts Association of the United Kingdom formed its Bahamas Local Association which became The Boy Scouts Association Bahamas Branch which changed its name to The Scout Association Bahamas Branch.

In the 1950s, a troop of Boy Scouts affiliated with the Boy Scouts of America was formed in Freeport.

Following The Bahamas becoming an independent nation in 1973, The Scout Association of the Bahamas was constituted on 1 August 1974.

The Scout Movement and Girl Guides in the Bahamas is now mainly served by

- The Bahamas Girl Guides Association, member of the World Association of Girl Guides and Girl Scouts
- The Scout Association of the Bahamas, member of the World Organization of the Scout Movement
