= Queen's Park, Bridgetown (Barbados) =

Coordinates: 13.0983°N 59.6091°W

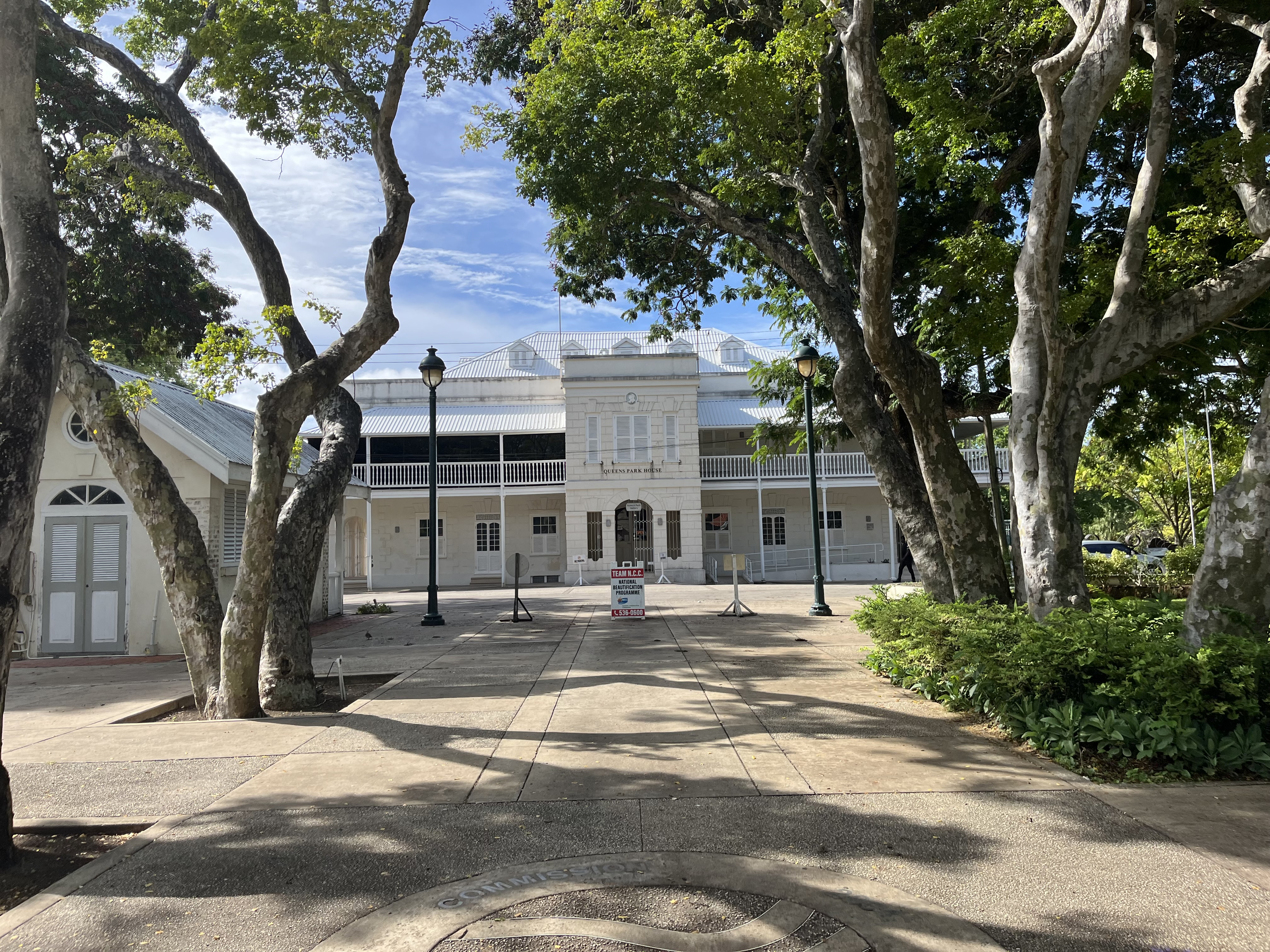
Queen's Park, Bridgetown (Barbados)

Queen's Park is a national park in Barbados. The park was the former home of the Commander of the British Troops stationed in Barbados for the West Indies. Situated in the northeastern segment of the capital city Bridgetown, the park's borders are roughly Roebuck and Crumpton Streets to the north and west, and Halls and Constitution Roads located east and south. It shares parts of its grounds with Harrison College and the Headquarters of the Barbados Transport Board. Like some of the island's other national parks, Queen's Park remains a site of historic interest.

== History ==
Queen's Park House, is a two-storey structure, built in 1786 located inside the park. The house was initially used as the residence of the Commander in Chief of the British Garrison when they were permanently stationed in Barbados at St Anne's Fort from 1780 to 1905. In the first year that the house was rented for this purpose it was destroyed by the great hurricane of 1780.

Nevertheless, on December 27, 1782 the Crown bought the property from Edward Falkinham and the house was rebuilt two years later.

At one time there was a sizable barracks of soldiers in the southern part of the property. When the British Garrison presence's at St. Ann's Fort was phased out in 1905, the Barbados Government then purchased the property and the Adjutant-General's Quarters and leased to the Vestry of St Michael. It was opened as a national park on June 10, 1909.

The park was designed by Lady Gilbert Carter, (the same person who designed the gardens at Ilaro Court, the now the official residence of the Prime Minister of Barbados.)

== Queen's Park Today ==
Today the National Conservation Commission (NCC) is responsible for the maintenance of the park. Queen's Park not only boasts of a playground for children but also a gazebo, a Steel Shed, a pool & fountain, beautiful gardens and a sports ground where sports like cricket could be played.

It is also the home of one of the only two existing baobab trees on the island. The other is located in St Thomas. This massive tree, which is almost 1000 years old, is about 18m in circumference.

Additionally, Queen's Park House today is still well preserved and now houses the Daphne Joseph Hackett theatre and the Queen's Park Gallery.

Throughout the years Queen's Park has doubled as a park and the site of numerous cultural events, CARIFESTA 1981, the annual Healthy Lifestyle Extravaganza and the traditional Christmas Morning Service.
