= Governor Murphy =

Governor Murphy may refer to:

- Francis P. Murphy (1877–1958), 64th Governor of New Hampshire
- Frank Murphy (1890–1949), 35th Governor of Michigan
- Franklin Murphy (governor) (1846–1920), 31st Governor of New Jersey
- Isaac Murphy (died 1882), 8th Governor of Arkansas
- John Murphy (Alabama politician) (1786–1841), 4th Governor of Alabama
- Oakes Murphy (1849–1908), 10th and 14th Governor of Arizona Territory
- Phil Murphy (born 1957), 56th Governor of New Jersey
- William Lindsay Murphy (1888–1965), Governor of the Bahamas from 1945 to 1950
- Dennis Murphree (1886–1949), 42nd and 47th Governor of Mississippi
