= The Bahamas Girl Guides Association =

- Country: The Bahamas
- Founded: 1915
- Membership: 1773
- Affiliation: World Association of Girl Guides and Girl Scouts
- Website https://www.bgga.org

The Bahamas Girl Guides Association is the national Guiding organization of the Bahamas. It serves 1773 members (as of 2018). Founded in 1915, the girls-only organization became a full member of the World Association of Girl Guides and Girl Scouts in 1978.

== History ==
Girl Guides were introduced to the Bahamas in 1915, during the British colonial era, by Constance Greene, the wife of the Governor of the Bahama Islands at that time. Guiding activities were suspended after 1935 due to a lack of leaders, then restarted in Nassau in 1946. In the years after, trainers from Girlguiding UK came to assist the leaders in the Bahamas with increasing their membership, and groups were established in the outer islands.

The Association gained a headquarters in 1952. In 1975, it became an associate member of the World Association of Girl Guides and Girl Scouts, and in 1978, it was incorporated in the Bahamas and became a full member. An international camp was first held in 1987 and saw participation of Guides and Scouts from 38 countries. Membership was 2744 members in 1992. In 1994, it was reported that community service for the disabled, needy, and elderly, as well as camping, were popular activities for Guides; caring for the environment is another major aspect of the Association's programming. Membership in 2018 was reported as being 1773.

In the late 1990s, the Association began seeking land for a new headquarters. Reaching a lease agreement with the Bahamas government took around two decades; an agreement was not made and signed until 2017. The Association installed solar panels at their new headquarters to model and created natural trains and environmental education modules. The headquarters were expanded in 2025 to add a dormitory to the second floor for short-term stays.

== Program and ideals ==
The association is divided into four sections according to age:

- Sunflowers – ages 5 and 6
- Brownies – ages 7 to 9
- Guides – ages 10 to 14
- Rangers – ages 15 to 18

=== Guide Promise ===
I promise that I will do my best,
To do my duty to God,
To serve the Queen and my country,
To help other people
and to keep the Guide Law.

=== Guide Law ===
1. A Guide is loyal and can be trusted
2. A Guide is helpful
3. A Guide is polite and considerate
4. A Guide is friendly and a sister to all Guides
5. A Guide is kind to animals and respects all living things
6. A Guide is obedient
7. A Guide is cheerful and has courage in all difficulties
8. A Guide makes good use of her time
9. A Guide takes care of her own possessions and those of other people
10. A Guide is self-controlled in all she thinks, says and does

== See also ==
- The Scout Association of the Bahamas
