= William Grey-Wilson =

British Colonial governor (1852–1926)

Sir William Grey-Wilson KCMG KBE
- Portrait by Walter Stoneman, 1925

Governor of the Falkland Islands
- In office 1897–1904
- Monarchs: Queen Victoria; Edward VII
- Preceded by: Sir Roger Tuckfield Goldsworthy
- Succeeded by: Sir William Lamond Allardyce

Governor of the Bahamas
- In office 1904–1912
- Monarchs: Edward VII; George V
- Preceded by: Sir Gilbert Thomas Carter
- Succeeded by: Sir George Basil Haddon-Smith

Personal details
- Born: 7 April 1852
- Died: 14 February 1926 (aged 73)
- Spouse: Margaret G. Brown (m. 1884)

Sir William Grey-Wilson KCMG, KBE (7 April 1852 – 14 February 1926) was a British colonial administrator. He served as Governor of St Helena from 1887 to 1897, Governor of the Falkland Islands from 1897 to 1904 and Governor of the Bahamas from 1904 to 1912. He was made a Knight of the Order of St Michael and St George in 1904 and a Knight Commander of the Order of the British Empire in 1918.

== Early life and education ==
He was born William Wilson, the son of Andrew Wilson, Inspector-General of Hospitals, Honorable East India Company and his wife Catherine Grey. Through his mother, Wilson was the grandson of Edward Grey, Bishop of Hereford and the great-grandson of Charles Grey, 1st Earl Grey. Wilson was educated at Cheltenham College.

== Career ==
In 1874, Wilson became private secretary to his maternal uncle, Sir William Grey, the Governor of Jamaica. In 1877, he became the private secretary to Sir Frederick Palgrave Barlee, Lieutenant Governor of British Honduras. In 1878 Grey-Wilson was appointed Clerk of the Executive and Legislative Councils of British Honduras, and in 1884 Assistant Colonial Secretary of the Gold Coast.

In 1886, he served as Colonial Secretary of St Helena and, from 1887 to 1897, as Governor of St Helena. In 1891, he was made a companion of the Order of St Michael and St George. From 1897 to 1904, he served as Governor of the Falkland Islands.

Grey-Wilson was appointed Governor of the Bahamas on 7 May 1904. He served in the role until 1912. He was knighted KCMG in 1904 and KBE in 1918. At the time of the latter appointment, he was serving as the Chairman of the Central Committee for Patriotic Organisations. In 1922, he was the chair of the executive committee of the Institute of Patentees.

== Awards and honours ==
In 1891, Grey-Wilson was made a companion of the Order of St Michael and St George.

He was knighted KCMG in 1904 and also made a Knight Commander of the Order of the British Empire in 1918.

He was made a commander of the Order of the Star of Romania by the King of Romania in honour of his war service and, in 1922, the King of England gave permission for him to wear the corresponding decoration.

In late 1926, a prize for inventors was named in his honour and awarded to the best inventor at the International Exhibition of Inventors at the Westminster.

== Personal life and death ==
Grey-Wilson was known for his home inventions, including a contraption to allow chickens to let themselves into a coop and an automatic door system to remotely admit guests to his house.

Grey-Wilson died on 14 February 1926 in Ospedaletti, Italy while on a trip to San Remo with Sir John Bromhead Matthews. He was 73. A funeral was held in San Remo with a memorial service in London.

Grey-Wilson was survived by his wife, Margaret, the only daughter of Robert Glasgow Brown, whom he had married in 1884 and the couple's two sons and a daughter. One of his granddaughters was crowned Miss British Honduras.

Government offices
Preceded by Hudson Janisch	Governor of St. Helena; 1887–1897	Succeeded by Robert Sterndale
Government offices
Preceded by Sir Roger Goldsworthy, KCMG	Governor of the Falkland Islands; 1897–1904	Succeeded by William Allardyce
Government offices
Preceded by Sir Gilbert Carter, KCMG	Governor of the Bahamas; 1904–1912	Succeeded by Sir George Haddon-Smith
