= William Allardyce =

British Colonial Governor

Sir William Allardyce GCMG
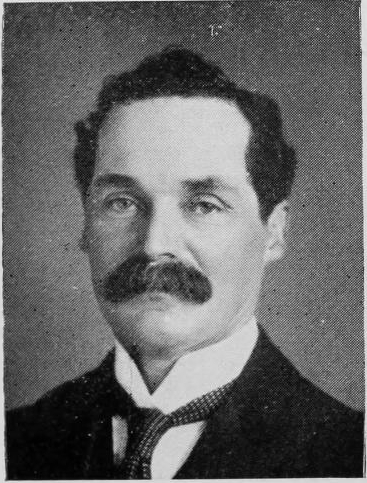

Acting High Commissioner for the Western Pacific
- In office 1901 – 10 September 1902
- Monarch: Edward VII
- Preceded by: Sir George O'Brien
- Succeeded by: Sir Henry Jackson

Acting Governor of Fiji
- In office 1901 – 10 September 1902
- Monarch: Edward VII
- Preceded by: Sir George O'Brien
- Succeeded by: Sir Henry Jackson

13th Governor of the Falkland Islands
- In office March 1904 – February 1914
- Monarchs: Edward VII; George V
- Preceded by: Sir William Grey-Wilson
- Succeeded by: Sir William Young

48th Governor of the Bahamas
- In office 15 June 1914 – 8 December 1920
- Monarch: George V
- Preceded by: Sir George Haddon-Smith
- Succeeded by: Sir Harry Cordeaux

13th Governor of Tasmania
- In office 16 April 1920 – 27 January 1922
- Preceded by: Sir Francis Newdegate
- Succeeded by: Sir James O'Grady

5th Governor of Newfoundland
- In office 1 September 1922 – 1 October 1928
- Monarch: George V
- Prime Minister: Richard Squires; William Warren; Albert Hickman; Walter Stanley Monroe; Frederick C. Alderdice
- Preceded by: Sir Charles Harris
- Succeeded by: Sir John Middleton

Personal details
- Born: 14 November 1861 Bombay, Bombay Presidency, India
- Died: 9 June 1930 (aged 68) Wokingham, Berkshire, England
- Spouse(s): Constance Angel Greene (m.1895, d.1919); Elsie Elizabeth Goodfellow, (nee Stewart, m.1920)

Viceregal styles of Sir William Allardyce
- Reference style: His Excellency
- Spoken style: Your Excellency

Sir William Lamond Allardyce, GCMG (14 November 1861 – 9 June 1930) was a career British civil servant in the Colonial Office who served as governor of Fiji (1901–1902), the Falkland Islands (1904–1914), Bahamas (1914–1920), Tasmania (1920–1922), and Newfoundland (1922–1928).

== Biography ==
Allardyce was born near Bombay, India, the son of Georgina Dickson Abbott and Colonel James Allardyce. Educated in Aberdeen, Scotland and at Oxford Military College, at the age of 18, he joined the British Civil Service in the Colonial Office. His brother Kenneth was also a colonial administrator, serving as Secretary for Native Affairs in Fiji.

Allardyce first posting was Fiji, where, just two years after his arrival, he was named acting Resident Commissioner for the island of Rotuma. The following year as magistrate and seven years later he was appointed to the Native Regulation Board and made the commissioner of the Supreme Court. In 1894, he was made Commissioner for Native Lands and given a seat in the Legislative Council. In 1895, he was appointed Native Commissioner, the chief liaison between the Fijian natives and the British. The following year he was appointed Receiver-General. He subsequently became Colonial Secretary and a member of the Executive Council in 1898.

In 1904, Allardyce was appointed as Governor of the Falkland Islands. After ten years at the Falklands, he was then transferred to the Bahamas to become its governor, a position he held for six years. Allardyce then became governor of Tasmania but retired after only two years—taking the last three months as leave—as a result of his failure to obtain an increase in his salary of £2750. In fact, a statement made to the Parliament of Tasmania on his salary and allowances was followed by a vote by the Legislative Assembly to abolish his office, although the same motion was defeated in the Legislative Council. Nevertheless, when he left office he was widely praised for his performance of the office.

Allardyce was subsequently ordered to Newfoundland where he was to succeed Sir Charles Alexander Harris as Governor of Newfoundland, where he was invited to become patron of the Great War Veterans Association. He was the official Crown representative of the unveiling of the National War Memorial by Field Marshal the Earl Haig on 1 July 1924. He officiated at the opening of the other national war memorial, Memorial University College, on 15 September 1925. Allardyce as governor was a key promoter in the decision awarding jurisdiction over most of the Labrador Peninsula to Newfoundland by the Privy Council.

Allardyce was appointed a Companion of the Order of St Michael and St George (CMG) in the 1902 Coronation Honours. In the 1916 New Year Honours, Allardyce was promoted to Knight Commander of the Order (KCMG) by King George V. He was further advanced to Knight Grand Cross of the Order (GCMG) in the 1927 Birthday Honours.

Allardyce was noted as one of the most competent administrators ever appointed by the Colonial Office to serve as the official representative of the British Crown in Newfoundland and Labrador.

Allardyce died of cancer on 9 June 1930 at Wokingham, Berkshire, England. The Allardyce Range on the island of South Georgia is named for him.

== Family ==
Allardyce married twice. First, in 1895, to Constance Angel Greene of Melbourne, Australia, daughter of Molesworth Richard Greene. She died in 1919; then, in 1920, he married Elsie Elizabeth Stewart, widow of A.C. Goodfellow. In 1923, Lady Allardyce helped start the Girl Guide movement in Newfoundland, and then in 1924, she established the Newfoundland Outport Nursing and Industrial Association (NONIA).

== See also ==
- List of people from Newfoundland and Labrador

Government offices
Preceded by Sir George O'Brien	High Commissioner for the Western Pacific, acting 1901–1902	Succeeded by Sir Henry Jackson
Preceded by Sir George O'Brien	Governor of Fiji, acting 1901–1902	Succeeded by Sir Henry Jackson
Preceded by Sir William Grey-Wilson	Governor of the Falkland Islands; 1904–1914	Succeeded by Sir William Young
Preceded by Sir George Haddon-Smith	Governor of the Bahamas; 1914–1920	Succeeded by Sir Harry Cordeaux
Preceded by Sir Francis Newdegate	Governor of Tasmania; 1920–1922	Succeeded by Sir James O'Grady
Preceded by Sir Charles Alexander	Dominion Governor of Newfoundland; 1922–1928	Succeeded by Sir John Middleton
