= Read Elding =

Acting governor of The Bahamas (fl. 1660's–1730s)

Read Elding (fl. 1665–1700s) was a mixed British and African Barbadian who served as acting Governor of The Bahamas from 1699 to 1701.

== Biography ==
Born near Speightstown, Barbados, Elding traveled or moved to Boston in 1695 and married Hannah Pemberton. Hannah was the granddaughter of James Pemberton, a founder of South Church in Boston. The couple had children, among them a daughter named Hannah, born in The Bahamas and sent to Boston, and three sons: Edward, Read (b. 1697) and John. Hannah married Samuel Miller, who was in his life elected constable like his father Alexander. The Millers were related to Benning Wentworth. From Elding's sons, his lineage is traced to families in the area of Buxton, Maine.

In 1699, Elding was appointed by Governor Nicholas Webb to lead a fleet of five ships against pirate Kelly. He did not capture the pirate, but returned to Nassau with the Bahama Merchant from Boston. The ship's captain claimed Elding and his associates stole it and abandoned the crew. Elding left for New Castle, Delaware and returned when Webb made him deputy governor before his death on New Providence. He replaced the vice admiral judge with a man named Dalton and appointed his brother-in-law Parker who was one of Henry Avery's men marshals. Elding was popular and fought piracy, notably having Hendrick van Hoven hanged in October 1699. He also banned correspondence with the Scots at Darién and complained of Danish activity. In 1701, Elias Haskett, who was dissatisfied with the state of affairs, became governor. In reaction to Haskett and newly appointed vice admiral judge Thomas Walker's corruption, Elding, customs officer John Graves, Ellis Lightfoot, and attorney general John Warren led a revolt. In October 1701, Haskett imprisoned Elding on grounds of piracy, seeking a bribe. Warren led a mob that freed Elding and imprisoned Haskett and Walker, with Lightwood being made governor. Haskett was stripped of his allegedly ill-gotten possessions and sent to New York City. In London he attempted to indict the men of piracy, but the cases fell through. During the Raid on Nassau, Lightwood was taken to Saint-Domingue, Walker fled to the Abaco Islands near Walker's Cay, and Elding to the Out Islands; he was known to have still been in The Bahamas during the 1730s.

== Sources ==
Bibliography

- Barber, Sarah (2014). The disputatious Caribbean : the West Indies in the seventeenth century. [Basingstoke]: Palgrave Macmillan New York. ISBN 978-1-137-48001-9 – via SpringerLink.
- Craton, Michael (1992–1998). Islanders in the stream: A History of the Bahamian People. Athens: University of Georgia Press. ISBN 9780820342733.
- Hanna, Mark G. (2015). Pirate nests and the rise of the British Empire, 1570-1740. Chapel Hill: University of North Carolina Press. ISBN 9781469617961.
- Zuidhoek, Arne (2022). The Pirate Encyclopedia The Pirate's Way. Piraí: Brill. ISBN 9789004515673.
