= William Lindsay Murphy =

British colonial administrator (1888–1965)

Sir William Lindsay Murphy, KCMG KStJ (1888–1965) was the British Governor of the Bahamas from 28 July 1945 to 1950. Prior to his appointment as governor, he was the Colonial Secretary of Bermuda from 1942 to 1945, before which he was the Mayor of Colombo and first Municipal Commissioner from 1937 to 1941 in Ceylon. The Irish poet Richard Murphy is his son. Sir William was educated at The Abbey Grammar School in Tipperary, County Tipperary. While governor of The Bahamas he officially opened the famous Lerner Marine Laboratory on the island of Bimini, a field station of the American Museum of Natural History. He was acting Governor-General of the Federation of Rhodesia and Nyasaland from February to October 1957.

His family's life in Ireland was documented in the film The Other Irish Travellers by his granddaughter, Fiona Murphy.

He is buried in Christ Church graveyard, Clifden, County Galway.

Government offices
Preceded by The Duke of Windsor	Governor of the Bahamas; 1945–1950	Succeeded by Sir George Ritchie Sandford
