= Robert Armitage Sterndale =

British naturalist, artist, writer and statesman

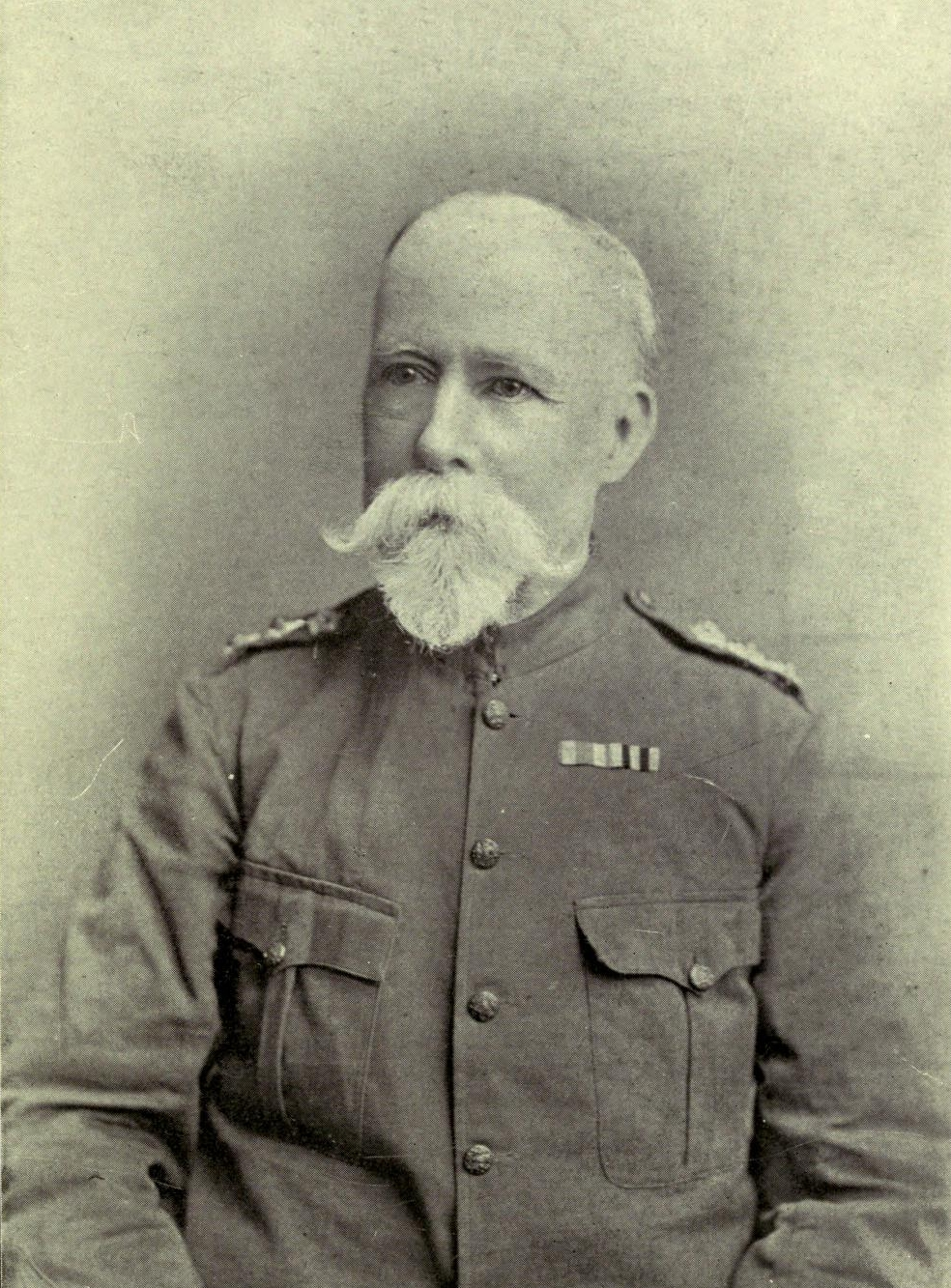
- Sterndale in his latter days

Crown Governor of St. Helena
- In office 1897–1902
- Monarch: Queen Victoria
- Preceded by: William Grey-Wilson
- Succeeded by: Henry Galway

Personal details
- Born: 30 June 1839
- Died: 3 October 1902 (aged 63)
- Spouse: Mary Catherine née Spitta
- Children: 2 daughters

Robert Armitage Sterndale CMG FZS (30 June 1839 – 3 October 1902) was a British naturalist, artist, writer and statesman who worked in British India before becoming governor general of St. Helena. His books on animals inspired Rudyard Kipling.

== Early life ==
Robert was born on 30 June 1839, the fourth son of Margaret Craufuird (1806–1866) and William Handley Sterndale (1791–1866) from Ashford-in-the-Water in Derbyshire, who went to India to become an indigo planter in Tirhoot, Bihar. Robert studied privately before qualifying for the Indian Civil Service (ICS) and going to India in 1856 to work in the finance department.

One of his brothers Handley Bathurst Sterndale (1829–1878) was an archaeologist who suggested connections between the monuments made by vanished Polynesian civilizations and relics in India, Britain and Central America. His sister Agnes married Sir Cecil Beadon in 1860.

== British India ==
Sterndale volunteered with local regiments during the Indian Rebellion of 1857 and became a deputy collector in August 1859. He later became an assistant settlement officer and then in the finance departments at Nagpur, Calcutta and Punjab. He became Accountant General for Bombay in January 1884 and then at Madras in 1887.

== Naturalist ==
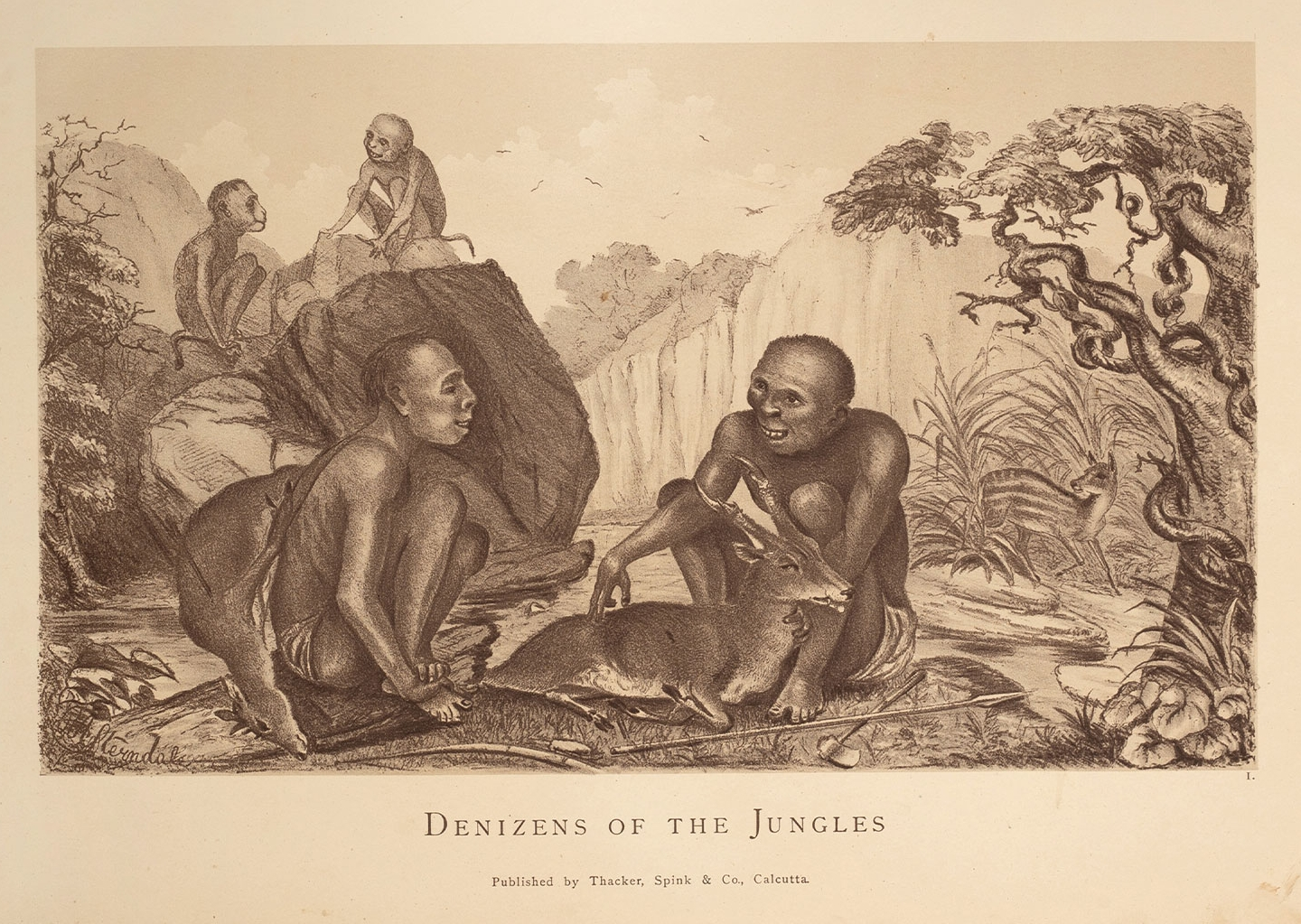
A plate from Denizens of the Jungle (1886)

A keen sportsman and big-game hunter, he wrote several books on natural history including on the mammals of India, republished in a new and abridged edition by Frank Finn. He was one of the first editors of the Journal of the Bombay Natural History Society. His work Seonee, or Camp Life on the Satpura Range published in 1877 influenced the work of Rudyard Kipling and inspired many scenes in the Jungle Book. He also wrote for newspapers contributing to The Asian. An accomplished artist, he made pen sketches, water colours and oil paintings of natural history subjects and was a friend of the artist John Trivett Nettleship. He illustrated two books of E. H. Aitken and contributed a few illustrations to the Lays of Hind by "Aliph Cheem" apart from his own books.

Sterndale worked in the Currency Department (starting as an assistant to the deputy commissioner of paper currency in 1868) at Calcutta and retired in 1890. In 1891, the congress of orientalists awarded him a medal of merit.

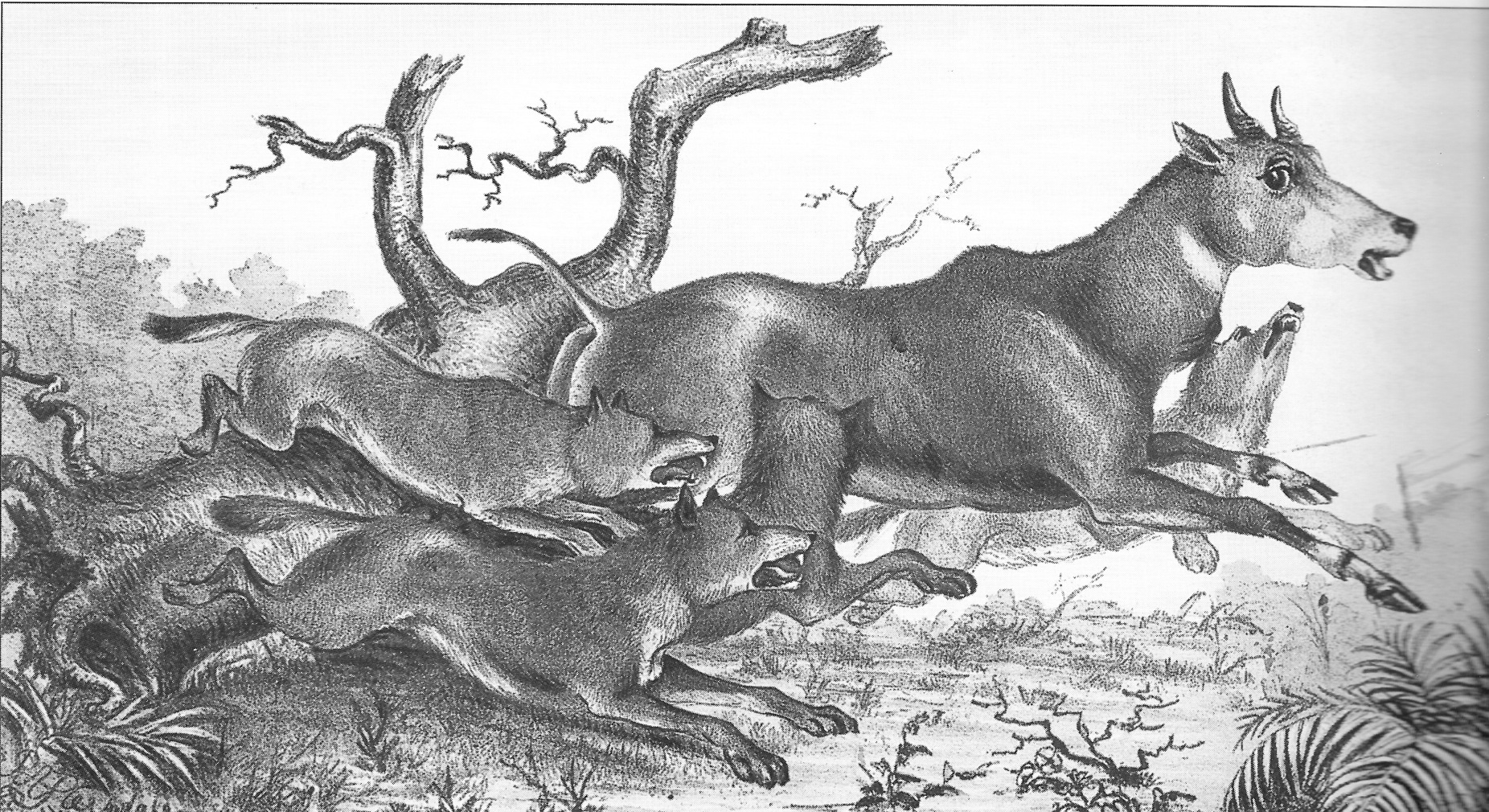
A Race for Life. Illustration by R.A. Sterndale

== Later days ==
In 1894 he helped in setting up of a committee (other members included Robert Herbert, James Mackenzie, E. Field, Grant Blunt, J. C. Mellis) in London to save St. Helena and set up a fish curing industry. In 1895 he was temporarily assigned to govern St. Helena during the absence of William Grey-Wilson and was posted as a Governor in 1897, a position that was succeeded by Henry Lionel Galway in 1902.

== Death ==
Sterndale died of a heart attack at the St. Ermin's Hotel in Westminster while home on sick leave from St. Helena on 2 October 1902. His wife Mary Catherine née Spitta (1845–1927) died at Southsea. They had two daughters: Harriet Mary Sterndale (b. 1873) who married Col Cecil Charles Palmer RA (b. 1872); and Annette Mary Elinor Sterndale (b. 1875) who married Major David Birdwood Thomson (1863–1930) a brother of Christopher Thomson, 1st Baron Thomson.

== Publications ==
- [1884] Natural History of the Mammalia of India and Ceylon. Thacker, Spink, and Co., London and Calcutta.
- [1887] Seonee, or Camp Life on the Satpura Range. Thacker, Spink and Co., Calcutta and Simla.
- [1886] Denizens of the Jungle. Thacker, Spink and Co., Calcutta and Simla.
- [1879] The Afghan Knife: A Novel. Volume 1 Volume 2 Volume 3
