= Constance Greene =

Australian palaeontologist (1861–1919)

Constance Angel Greene, Lady Allardyce OBE
- Born: 23 December 1861; Victoria, Australia
- Died: 23 November 1919 (aged 57); Nassau, Bahamas
- Known for: Devonian fossils of the Falkland Islands
- Spouse: William Allardyce
- Awards: OBE

Constance Angel Greene, Lady Allardyce OBE (23 December 1861 – 23 November 1919) was a natural historian, who became known for her collection of fossils from the Devonian of the Falkland Islands. These played an important role in attempts by geologists to reconstruct the ancient continent of Gondwana. She also created a museum in Port Stanley to illustrate the geology, fauna and flora of the Falkland islands. A trilobite, Metacryphaeus allardyceae, was named in her honour.

== Biography ==
Greene was born in Rowsley, Victoria, Australia, on 23 December 1861, the second daughter of Molesworth Greene (1827–1916), a pastoralist. She grew up in Victoria, and won singles tennis championships in Victoria, New South Wales and South Australia. In 1895, she married William Lamond Allardyce, and moved to Fiji, where Allardyce was a commissioner. In 1904, they moved to the Falkland islands when Allardyce took up the post of Governor. On the Falkland islands, Greene took a keen interest in natural history and, after the discovery of some fossils on Pebble Island, Greene gathered a comprehensive collection of fossils of Devonian age. She shared these, and held extensive correspondence with, academic geologists John Clarke in the United States, and Ernest Schwarz in South Africa.

In 1915, Allardyce was appointed Governor of the Bahamas, and they moved to Nassau. Greene played an active role in the Red Cross during the First World War and was honorary president of the charitable organisation, Daughters of the Empire in the Bahamas. In 1916, she was made a Dame of Grace of the Order of St John (DStJ), and was appointed OBE in the 1919 Birthday Honours for services to War Charities. She became known as Lady Allardyce in 1916, after her husband was appointed KCMG.

== Fossils of Pebble island ==
In 1833, Charles Darwin discovered some fossil-bearing rocks on the Falkland Islands while on the voyage with HMS Beagle. The main fossils the Darwin recovered were brachiopods, and Darwin recognised that they were similar to some very old fossils from Britain; now considered to be of Devonian age. Several other small collections of fossils were made from the same unit through the nineteenth century. In the early 1900s, Greene was involved setting up a museum in Port Stanley, which included some rock and fossil samples. Greene provided assistance to a Swedish geologist, Thore Halle, who was involved in fieldwork from 1907 to 1908, helping him to locate fossil localities. Shortly after, Greene visited a new locality on Pebble island, that had been found by some local children. These fossils showed excellent preservation, and Greene was able to respond to a later request from American paleontologist John Clarke by sending him a large set of fossil materials. Clarke was so impressed, he wrote to Greene saying "I salute you ... as the most successful of Falkland Islands geologists, not excepting Charles Darwin himself".

Clarke later published a monograph describing the fossil assemblage in detail. He used some samples that Greene had partly prepared and identified, and used her descriptions and illustrations in the publication. The 22 species in the collection, including trilobites, brachiopods, bivalves, gastropods, crinoids and orthocones. Clarke named the trilobite Metacryphaeus allardyceae in her honour.
