= The Scout Association of the Bahamas =

- Location: 19 Dolphin Drive P.O. Box N-4272 Nassau
- Country: Bahamas
- Founded: 1 August 1974 Incorporated 19 November 1975
- Founder: The Boy Scouts Association of the United Kingdom
- Membership: 644
- Affiliation: World Organization of the Scout Movement
- Website scoutbahamas.org

Scouting in The Bahamas began in 1912. For the history of Scouting in the Bahamas generally see Scouting in the Bahamas.

The Boy Scouts Association of the United Kingdom first registered a Bahamas troop of Boy Scouts on 19 March 1913 and formed its Bahamas Local Association. The Boy Scouts Association Bahamas Local Association became The Boy Scouts Association Bahamas Branch which changed its name to The Scout Association Bahamas Branch. Following The Bahamas becoming an independent nation in 1973, The Scout Association of the Bahamas was constituted on 1 August 1974 and succeeded The Scout Association Bahamas Branch. The Association became a member of the World Organization of the Scout Movement in the same year. The Scout Association of the Bahamas was incorporated on 19 November 1975.

The coeducational Scout Association of the Bahamas had 1,060 members in 2010 and has 644 members as of 2021.

The Scouts own a 30-acre (120,000 m^{2}) recreational site in Adelaide Village, New Providence. The site was donated to the Scouts by the Bahamian government in 1926. It is used for activities such as camping and hiking.

The emblem of The Scout Association of the Bahamas features a very stylized marlin and flamingo head, topped by a rounded black arrowhead, in the colors of the flag of the Bahamas. Until 2015, the Association's emblem included a marlin and flamingo, the heraldic supporters of the coat of arms of the Bahamas, as well as the flag of the Bahamas.

== See also ==
- The Bahamas Girl Guides Association
