= State House, Barbados =

State House
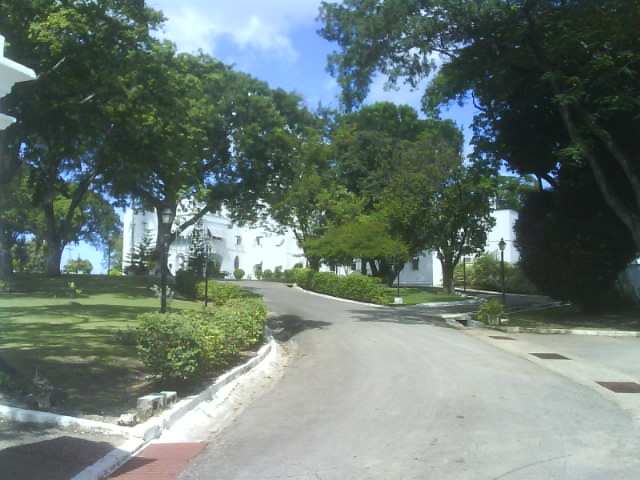
- Former names: Government House

General information
- Type: Official residence
- Location: Government Hill, St. Michael, Barbados
- Coordinates: 13.10120°N 59.59960°W
- Current tenants: Jeffrey Bostic, President of Barbados
- Client: Government of Barbados

The State House (formerly Government House) is the official residence and office of the president of Barbados. It was built in 1702 during the colonial days and served as a Quaker Plantation, until it was purchased by the imperial government, to act as a replacement to the Bagatelle Great House in the Parish of St Thomas.

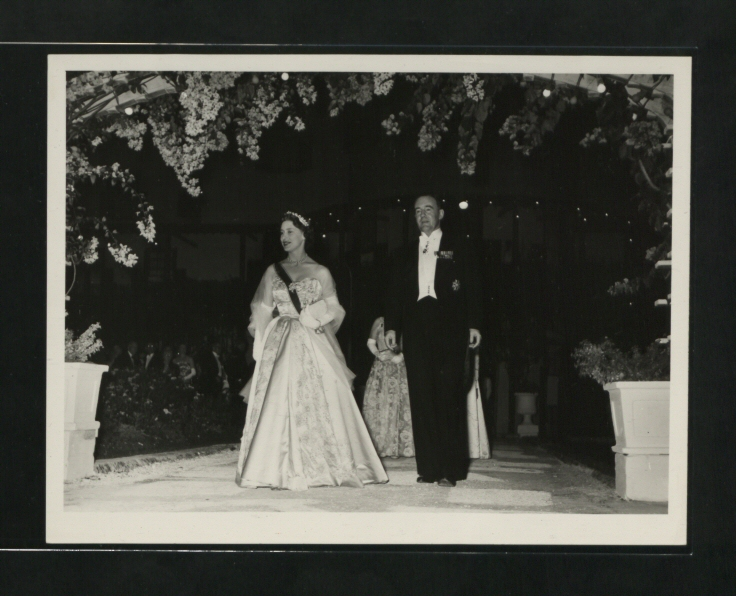
Princess Margaret at Government House

From then, it served as the residence of the governor of Barbados. It later continued in the role of official residence and office of the governor-general of Barbados following independence from the United Kingdom in 1966. Upon the abolition of the monarchy on 30 November 2021, Government House was renamed State House and has effectively become the official residence of the president of Barbados.

== See also ==
- Ilaro Court, the official residence of the prime minister
- Government Houses of the British Empire
- Governor-General of Barbados
- List of governors of Barbados
- President of Barbados
- Monarchy of Barbados
