= George Basil Haddon-Smith =

British colonial administrator

Sir George Basil Haddon-Smith KCMG

Governor of the Bahamas
- In office 29 October 1912 – 1914
- Monarch: George V
- Preceded by: Sir William Grey-Wilson
- Succeeded by: Sir William Lamond Allardyce

Governor of the Windward Islands
- In office 1914–1923
- Preceded by: Sir James Hayes Sadler
- Succeeded by: Sir Frederick Seton James

Personal details
- Born: 25 November 1861 United Kingdom
- Died: 13 June 1931 (aged 69) London, United Kingdom
- Spouse: Eliza Constance Hodson

Sir George Basil Haddon-Smith KCMG (25 November 1861 –13 June 1931) was a British colonial administrator who was Governor of the Bahamas and Governor of the Windward Islands.

He was born the son of Henry Haddon-Smith and educated at the Victoria College, Jersey. He joined the colonial service and was posted to West Africa where he was the political officer of the Ashanti Field Force and served with the Hausa force against the Jebu tribe in 1892. He was Assistant Colonial Secretary in Lagos before being appointed Chief Assistant Colonial Secretary of the Gold Coast (now Ghana) in 1896. He was also political officer on the Ashanti expedition of 1900. He was acting Governor of The Gambia in 1901 and then served as Colonial Secretary of Sierra Leone for 11 years. He was made CMG in 1901.

In 1912 he moved to the Americas to be Governor of the Bahamas, transferring in 1914 to become Governor of the Windward Islands, a position he held until his retirement in 1923. He was made KCMG in 1915.

On his retirement he settled in Exmouth, Devon, dying of a spinal tumour in 1931. He had married Eliza Constance Hodson, with whom he had two sons. Their first son, Walter Basil, was killed as a captain in the First World War.
