= Gilbert Thomas Carter =

British naval officer and colonial administrator (1848–1927)

Sir Gilbert Thomas Carter KCMG
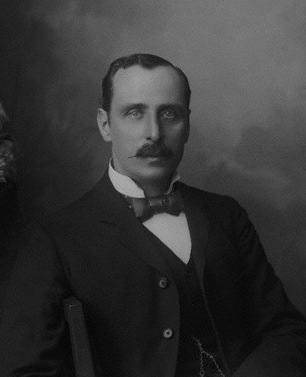
- Portrait of Sir Gilbert by Alexander Bassano, 1893

Personal details
- Born: 14 January 1848 Topsham, Devon
- Died: 18 January 1927 (aged 79) Barbados
- Spouses: Susan Laura Hocker 1874–1895; Gertrude Codman Parker 1903–1927
- Awards: Knight Commander of the Order of St Michael and St George; Companion of the Order of St Michael and St George

Military service
- Allegiance: United Kingdom
- Branch/service: Royal Navy
- Years of service: 1864–1875
- Rank: Assistant Paymaster
- Battles/wars: Third Anglo-Ashanto War
- Joined Navy (Assistant Clerk): 14 December 1864
- Promoted to Clerk: 4 July 1866
- Placed on Navy List (Promoted to Assistant Paymaster): 1 December 1869
- Placed on Retired List: 16 August 1875

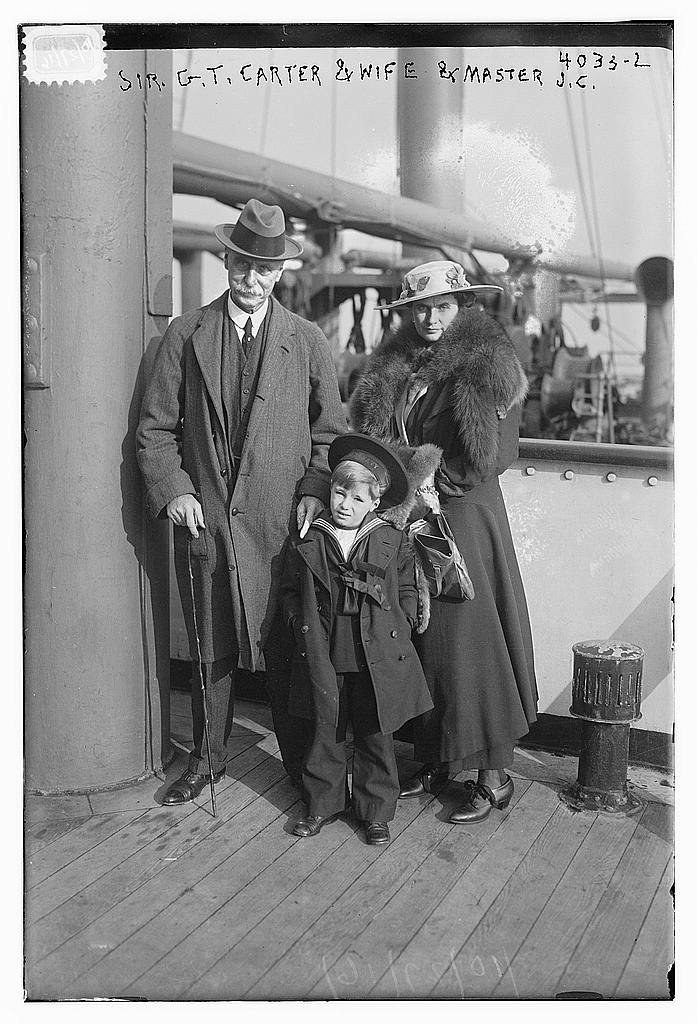
Gilbert Thomas Carter, Gertrude Codman Parker and John Codman Carter, 1916

Sir Gilbert Thomas Carter (also Gilbert-Carter) KCMG (14 January 1848 – 18 January 1927) was an administrative officer in the Royal Navy and a colonial official for the British Empire.

Starting as a Collector of Customs for the Gold Coast, he then became a Treasurer of the Gold Coast and the Gambia. Moving on to colonial administration, he started as the Administrator for the Gambia, where he dealt with the aggression of the native king of Gambia.

His next post was as Governor for the Lagos Colony where he negotiated treaties with the local chiefs which protected Christian missionaries and ending human sacrifies. He later served as the Governor for The Bahamas and Barbados and finally as the Governor for Trinidad and Tobago.

== Early life and Naval career ==
Carter was born in Topsham, Devon in 1848. He was the only son of Commander Thomas Gilbert Carter (R.N.). He was educated at the Royal Hospital School in Greenwich. Carter joined the Royal Navy in 1864, serving as an Assistant Clerk on HMS Frederick William, being transferred in 1866 to HMS Malacca. On 5 July 1866, Carter was promoted to Clerk, while still serving on HMS Malacca. Between 1867 and 1869, he served on a variety of ships as a clerk, until 1 December 1869 (while serving on HMS Pembroke), when he was promoted to Assistant Paymaster (being added to the Navy Directory).

Following a posting to HMS Royal Adelaide for the first nine months of 1870, Carter's final posting was to the Colonial steamer Sherbro from August 1870. During his time on Sherbro, he was involved with the Third Anglo–Ashanto War on the Gold Coast. When Elmina was sold to the British by the Dutch Government, he was a commissioner, responsible for valuing the stores and ordnance left behind by the Dutch. He married Susan Laura Hocker, daughter of Lieutenant-Colonel Edward Hocker, in 1874 (later having 3 sons and 2 daughters — his second son Humphrey 1884–1969 was the first Director of the Cambridge University Botanic Garden). Lady Carter died in 1895. He retired from the Navy on 21 July 1875.

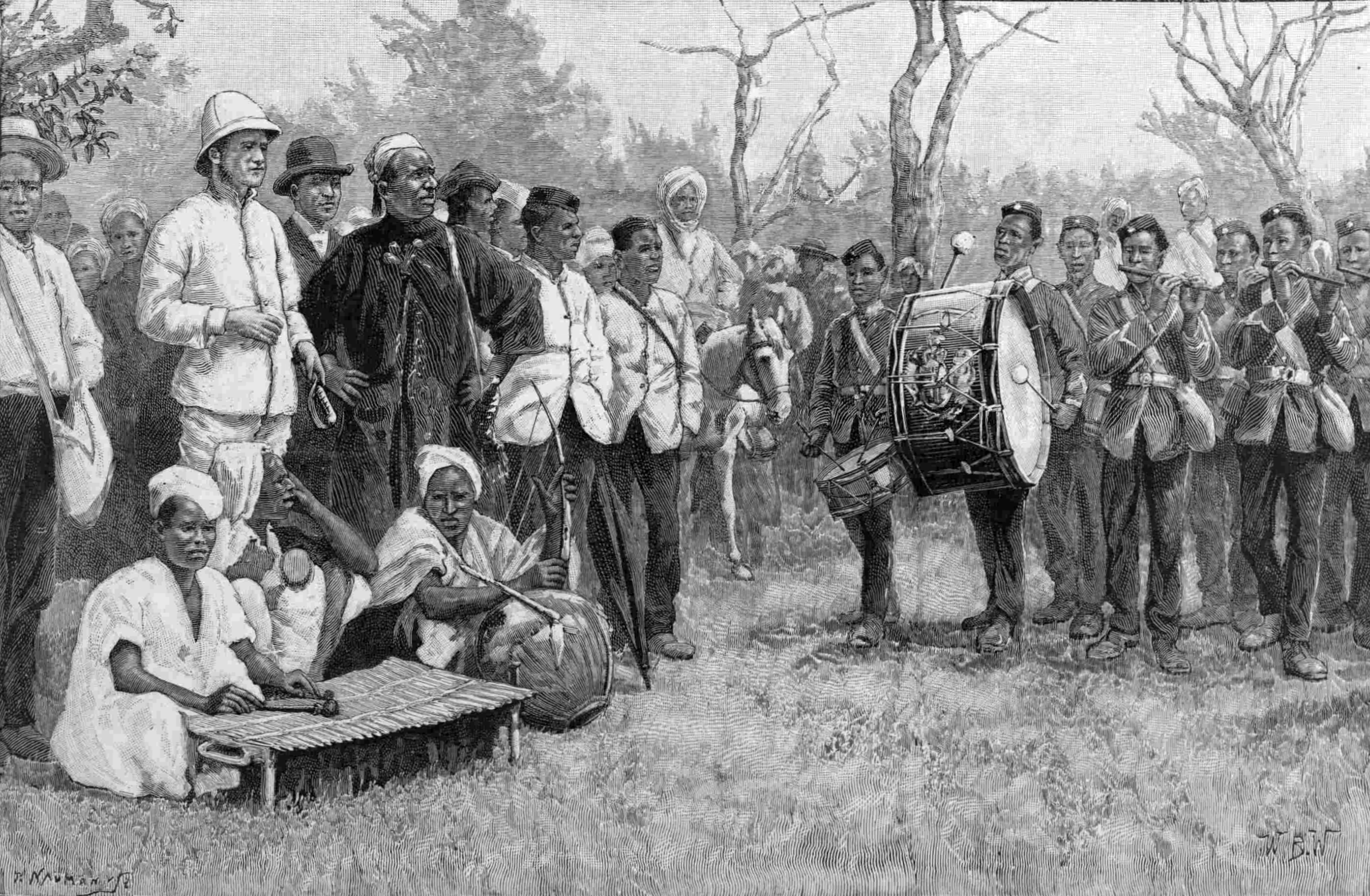
Illustration of Carter meeting with Musa Molo, Prince of Fuladu, in 1889.

== Initial Postings ==
Carter became the private secretary to Sir George Berkeley, Governor of the Leeward Islands, in 1875. In August 1879, he was appointed Collector of Customs and Treasurer of the Gold Coast, an appointment he kept until 1882.

== The Gambia ==
From 1882 until December 1888, Carter administered the Settlement on the Gambia as a Treasurer and Postmaster. From 1886, he was acting Administrator of the Colony of the Gambia, and on 1 December 1888 he was appointed Administrator on that colony's separation from Sierra Leone.

His term saw the signing of the Anglo-French Convention of 1889, which formalized the boundary between Gambia and Senegal. Carter was therefore tasked with establishing a boundary commission and imposing British power and law on the Protectorate and its various local rulers. This was a reversal from the decades-old policy against colonial expansion. In particular, he attempted to protect British-aligned towns from raiding by Fode Kaba and Musa Molo, who were often at odds with each other. While working in the Gambia, he was appointed Companion of the Order of St Michael and St George (CMG) on 1 January 1890.

== Lagos (Nigeria) ==
Carter was appointed Governor and Commander-in-Chief of the Colony of Lagos on 3 February 1891. Carter ordered an attack on the Ijebu "in the interest of civilization" in 1892. Afterwards, he continued to justify this attack as a war to end slavery and promote civilization.

Carter travelled to various parts of Yorubaland, accompanied by soldiers, in an attempt to demonstrate the might of the British. Carter was not well received at Oyo, and the Egba chiefs advised him not to interfere with slavery, while the Ibadan chiefs said they were afraid that their slaves would "assert their freedom by running to the Resident" – and they refused to sign a treaty with Carter that would impose a Resident on the city.

However, in January 1893 the Egba chiefs signed a Treaty of Independence with the British Government. It was agreed that freedom of trade between the Egba Nation and Lagos was to be guaranteed by the British Government, in return for which no road would be closed without the approval of the Governor. They further agreed that complete protection and "every assistance and encouragement" would be afforded to all Christian ministers. The Crown agreed that "no annexation on any portion of Egba Nation shall be made by her Majesty's Government without the consent of the lawful authorities of the nation, no aggressive action shall be taken against the said nation and its independence shall be fully recognized." The Egba chiefs further promised to abolish human sacrifices.

He was promoted Knight Commander of the Order of St Michael and St George (KCMG) on 3 June 1893, "in recognition of his services in conducting a mission to the Yoruba country which resulted in the negotiation of important treaties and brought to an end a long-standing war."

Carter was given Ife works of art in 1896 by the recently crowned King of Ife, Adelekan, in the hopes that a decision in his favour would be made about the resettlement of Modakeke residents outside the city. These works (including three known as the Ife marbles), were sent by Carter to Europe.

While serving in Lagos, Lady Carter, his first wife, died on 13 January 1895, shortly after arriving in Lagos.

The Carter Bridge, first built in 1901 and linking Lagos Island with Iddo Island, was named after him.

== Later life, retirement and death ==
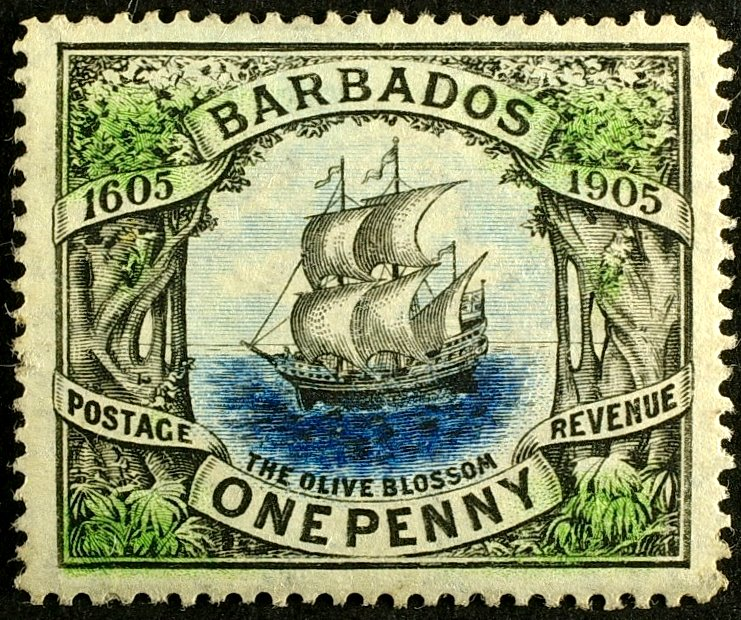
The 1905 "Olive Blossom" stamp of Barbados, designed by Gilbert's second wife, Gertrude.

Carter was transferred to Bahamas as Governor and Commander-in-Chief in 1898, and after a temporary transfer to Trinidad, in July 1904 he was transferred to the Barbados as Governor and Commander-in-Chief.

Carter met an American artist (see Stamp) from Boston, Gertrude Codman Parker (6 February 1875 – 12 November 1953, Boston), in the spring of 1903 when she was travelling in the Bahamas with her parents, Francis Vose Parker and his wife. She became his second wife on 25 August 1903, when they were married in the Church of the Advent in Boston and had a son, John Codman Carter.

Carter continued working in senior colonial positions — being appointed the Governor and Commander-in-Chief of the Island of Barbados and its Dependencies in 1904, and as Administrator of the Government of the Colony of Trinidad and Tobago, and its Dependencies in the absence of the Governor from 1907 until 1910, whereupon he retired.

In 1919, he changed his surname to Gilbert-Carter. In the early 1920s, he moved back to Barbados, and lived at Ilaro Court, which had been designed and built by Lady Gilbert Carter. He died there on 18 January 1927. When his will was probated on 22 March of that year, the total value of his effects was £6859 9s 11d.

== Bibliography ==
- Carter, Gilbert Thomas (1987). The Colony of Lagos. London, England: Royal Colonial Institute.
- Hughes, Arnold; Perfect, David (2008). Historical dictionary of the Gambia. African historical dictionaries. Vol. 79 (4 ed.). Lanham, Maryland, USA: Scarecrow Press. ISBN 978-0-8108-3660-0.
- ILN (19 January 1895). "The Arrival And Subsequent Death of Lady Carter at Lagos". Illustrated London News.
- "Lady Carter". Stamp Art. 16 November 2014.

Government offices
Preceded by Sir James Shaw Hay (1886–1888)	Administrator of the Gambia; 1888–1891	Succeeded by Sir Robert Baxter Llewelyn (1891–1900)
Preceded by Cornelius Alfred Moloney (1886–1891)	Governor and Commander-in-Chief of the Colony of Lagos (Nigeria); 1891–1897	Succeeded by Henry Edward McCallum (1897–1899)
Preceded by Sir William Frederick Haynes Smith (1895–1898)	Governor and Commander-in-Chief of the Bahama Islands; 1898–1904	Succeeded by Sir William Grey-Wilson (1904–1912)
Preceded by Sir Frederick Mitchell Hodgson (1900–1904)	Governor and Commander-in-Chief of the Island of Barbados and its Dependencies; 1904–1911	Succeeded by Sir Leslie Probyn (1911–1918)
