= 1942 Burma Road riot =

Labour riot in the Bahamas

- Part of Second World War
- Date: 1 June 1942
- Location: Nassau, Colony of the Bahamas
- Caused by: Low pay for Bahamian workers
- Result: Truce negotiated for better pay

Parties
Bahamian workers	(United States) American contractors	British Empire (The Bahamas) Colony of the Bahamas

Lead figures
		(British Empire) Edward, Duke of Windsor

Casualties
- Deaths: 5
- Injuries: 30
- Arrested: 114

The 1942 Burma Road riot was a riot in the colony of the Bahamas on 1 June 1942 between local Bahamian workers and American contractors working on constructing military airfields over pay and conditions. Five Bahamians were killed and 114 were arrested. The riot was calmed by the Governor of the Bahamas, The Duke of Windsor negotiating a truce.

== Background ==
During the Second World War, the British authorities authorised the construction of two new military airfields in the Bahamas. One in Nassau and one in New Providence. This was contracted out to Pleasantville Construction Company, who offered local Bahamian workers 8 shillings a day but due to British officials' objections, this was lowered to 4 shillings a day. The company also brought in American contractors to assist but they were paid the full 8 shillings. When the Bahamians found out about this, they protested to the company but the company told them it was that or nothing, with many Bahamians walking away from the project as a result.

== Riot ==
On 1 June, the former Bahamian workers marched on Burma Road in Nassau. The Attorney-General of the Bahamas, Eric Hallinan met the crowd on the steps of the Colonial Secretary's office and promised if the crowd sent a representative, they would be listened to. He also stated that the Americans had planned to bring their own workers but because the Bahamians were so good, they did not and asked the crowd not to "spoil the good impression they had made". Whilst some in the crowd returned to work as a result, the majority viewed this as a statement they would be replaced so started to turn violent and started damaging buildings, looting and throwing bottles stolen from a nearby Coca-Cola lorry as missiles. The main library and the post office were destroyed by the rioters setting them on fire. In response, the British authorities mobilised the Volunteer Defence Force and read the Riot Act, with a combined force of the military and Bahamas Police Force tackling the 800 strong riot. During the riot, 5 Bahamian rioters were shot dead by the security services and 30 British personnel were injured. 114 were arrested.

== Resolution ==
The Governor of the Bahamas, the Duke of Windsor (the former King Edward VIII) was abroad when the riot occurred but returned to Nassau immediately when he heard of it. Upon his return, Edward imposed a curfew and increased military patrols. He agreed to meet with the Bahamian workers to discuss the situation. Edward negotiated an agreement whereby the Bahamian workers would receive 5 shillings a day and a free lunch, which resulted in half of the workforce returning to the project by 4 June. Edward received praise from many in the Bahamas for negotiating a peaceful resolution, though Edward personally blamed the riot on communists and those who got jobs to avoid potentially being drafted.
