= George Sandford (colonial administrator) =

British colonial administrator

Sir George Ritchie Sandford, KBE, CMG (9 November 1892 – 17 September 1950) was a British colonial administrator, serving most of his 35-year career in East Africa. He was Governor of the Bahamas from 17 February 1950 until he died in office on 17 September 1950.

== Early life and education ==
Sandford was born on 9 November 1892 at Roselands, Ambleside, Westmorland, England. He attended Christ's Hospital school and Queens' College, Cambridge.

== Career ==
He joined the colonial service in 1915, first serving in the East Africa Protectorate (now Kenya) as Assistant District Commissioner. He resigned from his position to take on a short-lived role as editor at a local newspaper. Sandford went on to study law and was admitted to the Bar of England and Wales at the Inner Temple.

He rejoined the Colonial Service, assuming the role of clerk to the Legislative Council of Kenya in 1926 and becoming Deputy Treasurer in 1931.

In 1936, Sandford was posted to Tanganyika, where he assumed the role of Treasurer. He was appointed Financial Secretary in Tanganyika in 1937 and Financial Secretary in Palestine from 1940 to 1944.

Sandford returned to Tanganyika in 1944 as Chief Secretary and became the Administrator for the East African Commission in 1948.

Knighted in 1947, Sandford was appointed Governor of the Bahamas in February 1950, however, he died unexpectedly after only seven months in office.

== Death ==
Sandford died on 17 September 1950, aged 57 after complaining of indigestion. His funeral was held that same day at Christ Church Cathedral, Nassau and he was interred at St Matthew's Anglican Church Cemetery.

Sandford was survived by his wife Lady Sandford, and his brother, Brigadier Francis Rossall Sandford. He was succeeded in office by Major General Robert Arthur Ross Neville.
