= Ilaro Court =

Barbados Prime Minister residence

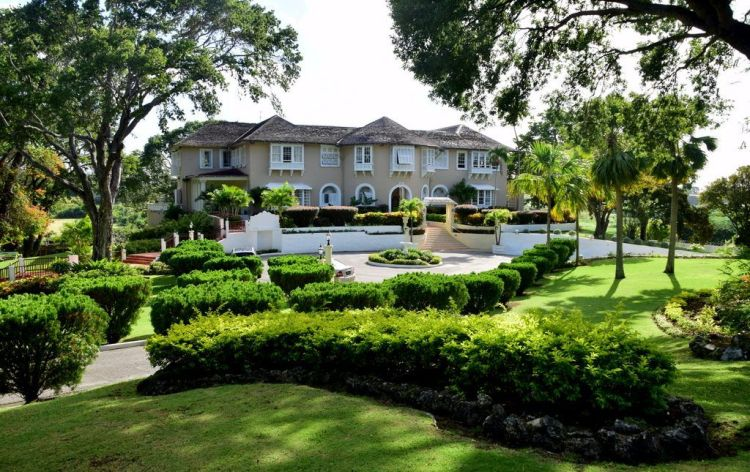
- North face of Ilaro Court
- Interactive map of the Ilaro Court area

General information
- Architectural style: Edwardian, Italian, Caribbean
- Location: Two Mile Hill, Saint Michael
- Current tenants: Mia Mottley (2018–present)
- Completed: 1919

Ilaro Court (pronounced: il'larō kôrt) is the official residence of the prime minister of Barbados. State House is the official residence of the President of Barbados.

== History ==
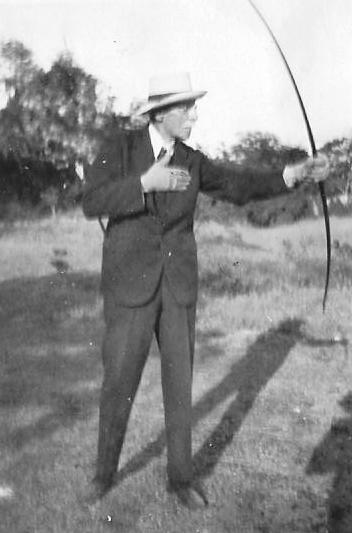
Sir Gilbert Carter in retirement at Ilaro Court

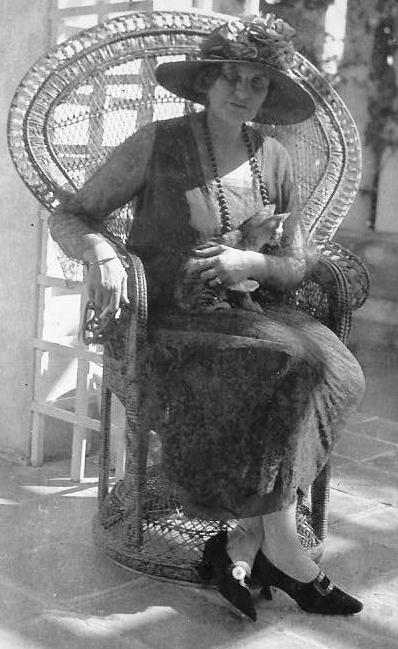
Lady Gilbert Carter at Ilaro Court in 1925

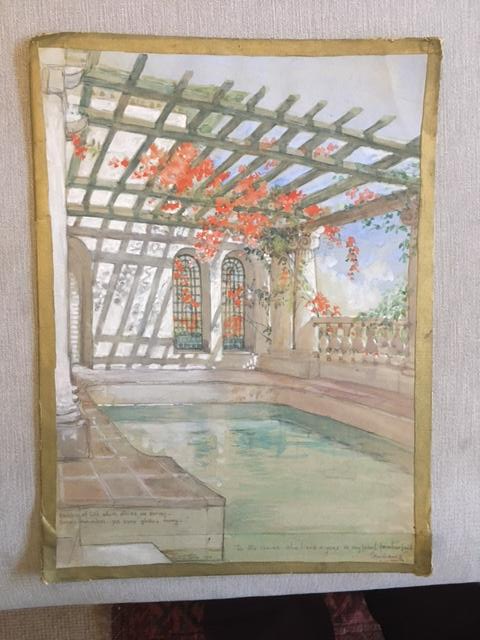
1925 watercolour painting (10x14 inches) signed by [Lady] Gilbert Carter of Ilaro Court's swimming pool, with her penciled "Emblem of life which still as we survey -- seems motionless -- yet ever glides away" and " To the Naiad [water nymph / dragon fly / Doris Turnbull] who lived a year in my pool, from her friend Seminad's".

1925 letter to her relations in England from Doris Turnbull, with her design of the lily pool.

Ilaro Court was designed and built in the early 1920s by Lady Gilbert Carter, an American artist whose husband Sir Gilbert Thomas Carter was Governor of Barbados from 1904 to 1911. The name Ilaro was derived from a town in Nigeria where the Governor was stationed when he was an officer. This gracious mansion built of local coral-limestone successfully combines Edwardian, Italian, and Caribbean architectural features into a distinctive and individualistic whole; it boasts the first swimming pool in Barbados — in which Prince Edward the Prince of Wales bathed when he visited Barbados. The large, park-like garden has a gazebo, fishpond and orchid house.

The property was purchased in the 1980s by the then Barbados Labour Party government under Prime Minister The Rt Hon. "Tom" Adams and was set to be a cultural centre; but the decision was made by the Cabinet to move the Prime Minister's official residence from Culloden Farm where it had been under Errol Barrow and make Ilaro Court the official residence of the Prime Minister. The house was extensively refurbished throughout the early years of the 1980s and filled with antique furniture most of which had been made by the talented prisoners of the Glendairy prisons. In 1984 Tom Adams and his family moved into the residence officially and made it their home; unfortunately however, Tom Adams died a year later of a heart attack in the study.

Thereafter, all persons who held the office of prime minister in Barbados, stayed at the residence, with the exception of Rt Hon. Errol Barrow (later Rt. Excellent). Among the prime ministers who stayed at the residence were the Rt. Hon. J.M.G.M. "Tom" Adams, the Hon. Bernard St. John, the Rt Hon Lloyd Erskine Sandiford later Sir. Lloyd, the Rt Hon. Owen Arthur, the Hon. David Thompson, who, in May 2010 moved back to his St. Philip residence after he had been diagnosed with pancreatic cancer, subsequently dying on 23 October 2010. The resident who preceded the current Prime Minister Mia Mottley was the Rt. Hon. Freundel Stuart (2010-2018).

The property is maintained by the Barbados National Trust which ensures that all historic buildings are kept in a decent state of repair, preserving as much of Barbados' history as possible. At various times of the year the National Trust organizes tours to the mansion so locals and visitors alike can see where the head of the government spends most of their time.

Ilaro Court is now used primarily for official state functions and other events like Carols by Candlelight. The current prime minister, the Honourable Mia Mottley has not indicated yet whether she will reside at Ilaro Court. ce Ilaro Court was built on land of the house Glenelg that was owned by the solicitor Charles W Fleming.

== The gardens ==
The landscape architect Doris Turnbull designed and developed the extensive gardens in the mid-1920s. Born in 1898 on a tea plantation in Assam, India; she was brought up in London; trained in a gardening school south of London; she taught in the ladies' gardening college La Corbière école horticole pour jeunes filles on Lake Neuchatel in Switzerland; trained in Massachusetts' Lowthorpe School of Landscape Architecture, the worldwide-first-ladies' landscape-architecture college; and worked in Bermuda government gardens where she met her Scottish plant-pathologist husband-to-be Lawrence Ogilvie also working in Bermuda in the 1920s.

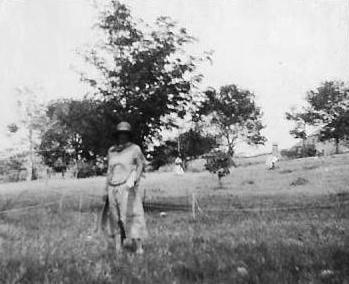
Doris Turnbull exploring the challenge of the site for the New garden 1925

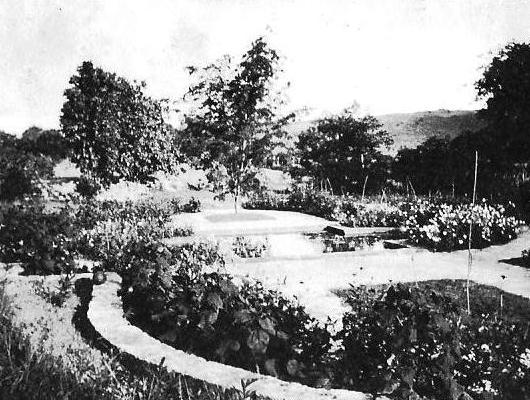
The New garden 1925

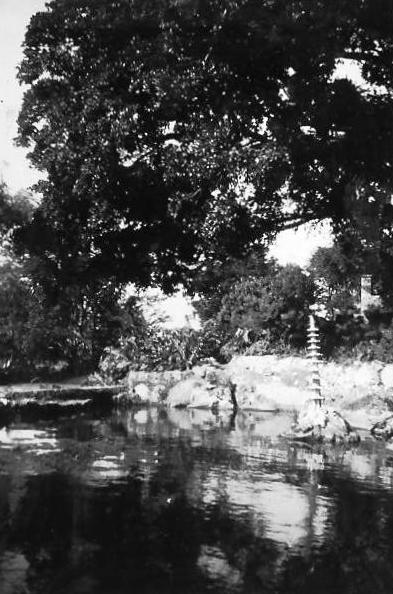
The new Burmese garden 1925

== See also ==
- State House, the official residence of the president of Barbados
- Prime Minister of Barbados.
