= Robert Neville (Royal Marines officer) =

British Royal Marines officer

Major-General Sir Robert Arthur Ross Neville, KCMG, CBE (17 December 1896 – 12 June 1987) was a British Royal Marines officer who served in both world wars. He was later Governor of the Bahamas from 1950 to 1953.

== Early life and education ==
Neville was born the son of a British Army officer and educated at Cheltenham College before joining the Royal Marines in 1914 at the age of 17.

== Career ==
=== Military career ===
During World War I, he served aboard the King Edward VII and the Royal Oak, participated in the Battle of Jutland, and commanded a company in France.

After the war, Neville served as aide-de-camp to the governors of Hong Kong, Ceylon, and Bombay, and worked with the Indian Statutory Commission. He also served in intelligence roles in Shanghai and aboard the Queen Elizabeth in the Mediterranean Fleet.

During World War II, he was Assistant Director of Naval Intelligence and Royal Marines Adviser to Combined Operations. Between 1945 and 1950, Neville was Commandant of the Plymouth Division of the Marines, Superintendent of the Royal Naval School of Music, and the final Commanding Officer of the Chatham Division of the Marines.

=== Governor of the Bahamas ===
Neville retired from the military in 1950 and was appointed Governor of the Bahamas on 10 November 1950. Neville assumed office on 6 December 1950 and completed his term on 11 October 1953. He was succeeded by the Earl of Ranfurly.

== Personal life and death ==
Neville married Doris Marie Collen Simpson in 1943, the couple had two children. A keen polo player, Neville also maintained a lifelong friendship with Lord Mountbatten. In 1948, Neville was made a Commander of the British Empire (CBE). He was knighted in 1952.

Neville died in 1986, aged 90.
