= Elling (name) =

Elling is both a masculine given name and a surname. Notable people with the name include:

== Given name ==
- Elling Carlsen (1819–1900), Norwegian skipper
- Elling Eielsen (1804–1883), Norwegian-American minister and Lutheran Church leader
- Elling Holst (1849–1915), Norwegian mathematician, biographer and children's writer
- Elling Rønes (1882–1965), Norwegian cross country skier
- Elling M. Solheim (1905–1971), Norwegian poet, playwright and short story writer
- Elling Olsson Walbøe (1763–1831), Norwegian politician

== Surname ==
- Aaron Elling (born 1978), American football player
- Ægidius Elling (1861–1949), Norwegian engineer and inventor considered the father of the gas turbine
- Catharinus Elling (1858–1942), Norwegian music teacher, organist, music critic and composer
- Kurt Elling (born 1967), American jazz singer and songwriter
