= List of governors of the Bahamas =

This is a list of governors of the Bahamas. The first English settlement in the Bahamas was on Eleuthera. In 1670, the king granted the Bahamas to the lords proprietors of the Province of Carolina, but the islands were left to themselves. The local pirates ruled a de facto 'Privateers' Republic' for several years; but in 1717 the Bahamas became a British crown colony, and the pirates were driven out.

During the American War of Independence, the Bahamas were briefly occupied by both American and Spanish forces. In 1964, the Bahamas achieved self-governance, and, in 1973, full independence.

== History ==
The Bahamas were first settled by William Sayle and a number of nonconformists from Bermuda in 1647. In 1670, Sayle, then the first Royal Governor of South Carolina , received a grant from King Charles II of England that the Bahamas were to be governed by the Governor of South Carolina; however many governors and lords proprietors deliberately neglected the islands. This led to a number of pirates settling in the Bahamas and setting up their own de facto Pirate Republic. The lords proprietors of South Carolina appointed Hugh Wentworth as the first official Governor of the Bahamas to deal with the pirates, but he died soon afterwards and was replaced by his brother John.

During the American Revolutionary War, the American rebels raided the Bahamas, as did the Spanish. The Governor Montfort Browne succeeded in evacuating the islands' gunpowder stores, but he was captured. He was released in a prisoner exchange but was later removed from the governorship as a result. The 1783 Treaty of Paris affirmed the Bahamas as a British possession.

In 1940, during the Second World War, Edward, Duke of Windsor (the former King Edward VIII) was appointed as the Governor of the Bahamas at the suggestion of the Prime Minister Winston Churchill. This was reportedly done due to suspicions that the Duke had Nazi sympathies. The Duke reportedly did not want to go, but eventually acquiesced after Churchill reminded him that even Major-Generals could be court-martialled. The Duke was praised for negotiating a peaceful settlement to the 1942 Burma Road riot during his tenure as Governor.

The last British Governor of the Bahamas was Sir John Paul, who held the position in 1972 and 1973. When the Bahamas gained their independence from the United Kingdom, Paul stayed as the representative of Queen Elizabeth II, now reigning as Queen of the Bahamas, as the new Governor-General of the Bahamas.

== List ==
Colonial Governors of the Bahamas
Image	Governor	From	To
Governor of Eleuthera (1648–1657)
	William Sayle	1648	1657
Proprietary governors of the Bahama Islands (1670–1706)
	Hugh Wentworth	1671	December 1671
	John Wentworth	December 1671	1676
	Charles Chillingworth	1676	1677
	Robert Clarke	1677	1682
	Richard Lilburne	1682	1684
British rule temporarily disrupted due to joint Spanish and French raid on Charlestown
	Thomas Bridges	1686	1690
	Cadwallader Jones (governor)	1690	1694
	Nicholas Trott	1694	1697
	Nicholas Webb	1697	1699
	Read Elding (acting)	1699	1701
	Elias Haskett	1701	1701
	Ellis Lightfoot	1701	1703
	Edward Birch	1704	1704
Privateers' Republic (1706–1718)
Royal governors of the Bahama Islands (1718–1776)
	Woodes Rogers	26 July 1718	1721
	George Phenney	1721	1728
	Woodes Rogers	August 1729	16 July 1732
	Richard Fitzwilliam (acting)	1734	1738
	John Tinker	1741	1758
	John Gambier (acting)	1758	1760
	William Shirley	1760	1768
	Sir Thomas Shirley, 1st Baronet	1768	1775
	Montfort Browne	1775	3 March 1776
Commandant of the Bahama Islands (during American occupation, 1776)
	Samuel Nicholas	3 March 1776	17 March 1776
Royal governors of the Bahama Islands (1776–1782)
	John Gambier (acting)	1776	1778
	John Robert Maxwell	1780	8 May 1782
Governors of Louisiana (during Spanish occupation)
	Bernardo de Gálvez y Madrid, Count of Gálvez	8 May 1782	19 April 1783
Royal governors of the Bahama Islands (1783–1969)
	Andrew Deveaux (acting)	19 April 1783	1783
	John Robert Maxwell	1783	1784
	James Edward Powell (Lieutenant-governor)	1784	1786
	John Brown (acting)	1786	1787
	John Murray, 4th Earl of Dunmore	1787	1796
	Robert Hunt (acting)	1796	14 February 1797
	John Forbes (Lieutenant-governor)	14 February 1797	June 1797
	Lieutenant-General William Dowdeswell	20 November 1797	1801
	John Halkett	1801	1804
	Charles Cameron	8 May 1804	1820
	Lewis Grant	1821	1829
	Sir James Carmichael Smyth, 1st Baronet	1829	1833
	Blayney Townley Balfour	1833	1835
	William MacBean George Colebrooke	1835	1837
	Sir Francis Cockburn	1837	1844
	George Benvenuto Mathew	1844	1849
	John Gregory	1849	1853
	Sir Alexander Bannerman	1854	1857
	Charles John Bayley	1857	1864
	Rawson William Rawson	1864	1869
	Sir James Walker	1869	1871
	Sir George Cumine Strahan	1871	1873
	Sir John Pope Hennessy	13 March 1873	1874
	Sir William Robinson	1874	1880
	Jeremiah Thomas Fitzgerald Callaghan	1880	1881
	Sir Charles Cameron Lees	1882	January 1884
	Sir Henry Arthur Blake	4 January 1884	1887
	Sir Ambrose Shea	1887	1895
	Sir William Frederick Haynes Smith	1895	1898
	Sir Gilbert Thomas Carter	1898	1904
	Sir William Grey-Wilson	1904	1912
	Sir George Basil Haddon-Smith	1912	1914
	Sir William Allardyce	15 June 1914	1920
	Sir Harry Edward Spiller Cordeaux	8 December 1920	1926
	Major Sir Charles Orr	December 1926	January 1932
	Sir Bede Clifford	10 January 1932	23 July 1937
	Sir Charles Dundas	27 November 1937	1940
	The Duke of Windsor	18 August 1940	30 April 1945
	Sir William Lindsay Murphy	28 July 1945	21 July 1949
	F. A. Evans (Acting Governor)	22 July 1949	31 December 1949
	Sir George Sandford	17 February 1950	15 September 1950
	Major General Sir Robert Neville	6 December 1950	1953
	Daniel Knox, 6th Earl of Ranfurly	21 December 1953	19 December 1956
	Sir Raynor Arthur	1 April 1957	14 June 1960
	Sir Robert Stapledon	18 July 1960	April 1964
	Ralph Grey, Baron Grey of Naunton	3 June 1964	1 November 1968
	Sir Francis Hovell-Thurlow-Cumming-Bruce	1 November 1968	1969
Governors of the Commonwealth of the Bahama Islands (1969–1973)
	Francis Hovell-Thurlow-Cumming-Bruce, 8th Baron Thurlow	1969	1972
	Sir John Paul	14 May 1972	10 July 1973

On 10 July 1973 the Bahamas gained full independence from the United Kingdom, and the viceroy became the Governor-General of the Bahamian Monarch.

== Sources ==
- Wettenhall, R. L. "Gregory, John (1795–1853)". Australian Dictionary of Biography. Natl Centre of Biography, Australian Natl University.
