= First ladies and gentlemen of Trinidad and Tobago =

First Gentleman of the Republic of Trinidad and Tobago
- Incumbent; Kerwyn Garcia since March 20, 2023
- Residence: President's House, Port of Spain, Trinidad and Tobago
- Term length: Five years, renewable indefinitely
- Precursor: Consort of the Monarch of Trinidad and Tobago
- Inaugural holder: Lady Ermyntrude Clarke
- Formation: August 1, 1976

First Lady of Trinidad and Tobago or First Gentleman of Trinidad and Tobago is the title attributed to the spouse of the president of Trinidad and Tobago, a position created in 1976. Until 19 March 2018, the office was held by women and thus referred to as First Lady before becoming vacant. The country's present first gentleman is Kerwyn Garcia, husband of President Christine Kangaloo, who has held the position since March 20, 2023.

The position should not be confused with the husband or wife of the prime minister of Trinidad and Tobago.

== First spouses of Trinidad and Tobago ==
Image	Name	Term Began	Term Ended	President of Trinidad and Tobago	Notes
	Lady Ermyntrude Clarke; March 7, 1921 – April 23, 2002 (aged 81)	August 1, 1976	March 13, 1987	Sir Ellis Clarke	Also wife of the Governor-General from 1972–1976 until her husband's office was abolished in 1976.
	Zalayhar Hassanali; May 3, 1931 (age 95)	March 18, 1987	Match 17, 1997	Noor Hassanali	First Indo-Trinidadian and Tobagonian and Muslim woman to hold the position of First Lady.
	Patricia Robinson; March 31, 1931 – September 10, 2009 (aged 78)	March 17, 1997	March 18, 2003	A. N. R. Robinson	Robinson was an economist and civil servant by profession.
	Jean Ramjohn-Richards; 1936 (age 89–90)	March 17, 2003	March 18, 2013	George Maxwell Richards	
	Reema Harrysingh-Carmona; November 22, 1970 (age 55)	March 18, 2013	March 19, 2018	Anthony Carmona	
	Position vacant	March 19, 2018	March 20, 2023	Paula-Mae Weekes	Weekes is unmarried.
	Kerwyn Garcia	March 20. 2023	present	Christine Kangaloo	
