= List of ambassadors of Spain to Trinidad and Tobago =

Ambassador of Spain to Trinidad and Tobago
- Coat of arms of Spain
- Incumbent; María Cristina Pérez Gutiérrez since 31 July 2024
- Ministry of Foreign Affairs; Secretariat of State for Ibero-America
- Style: The Most Excellent
- Residence: Port of Spain
- Nominator: The Foreign Minister
- Appointer: The Monarch
- Term length: At the government's pleasure
- Inaugural holder: José Pérez del Arco y Rodríguez
- Formation: 1967
- Website: Mission of Spain to Trinidad and Tobago

The ambassador of Spain to Trinidad and Tobago is the official representative of the Kingdom of Spain to the Republic of Trinidad and Tobago. It is also accredited to Barbados, Grenada, the Co-operative Republic of Guyana, Saint Vincent and the Grenadines, Saint Lucia and the Republic of Suriname.

Spain and Trinidad and Tobago established diplomatic relations in 1967, and that same year Spain appointed the first ambassador, who was resident in Caracas. Almost 40 years later, in 2006, Spain established a resident embassy in Port of Spain, and it was also accredited to several Caribbean states previously managed by the ambassador to Jamaica.

== Jurisdiction ==
- Trinidad and Tobago: Diplomatic relations between both nations are managed through the respective ambassadors. The Consular Section of the Embassy provides consular services to the entire country, and an honorary consulate is located in Seminyak, close to Denpasar.

Also, the ambassador to Trinidad and Tobago is accredited to:

- Barbados: Barbados and Spain maintain diplomatic relations since 1986. Spain has an honorary consulate in Welches, Barbados.
- Grenada: Grenada and Spain maintain diplomatic relations since 1986. Spain has an honorary consulate in St. George's, Grenada.
- Guyana: Guyana and Spain maintain diplomatic relations since 1986. Spain has an honorary consulate in Georgetown, Guyana.
- Saint Vincent and the Grenadines: Both nations maintain diplomatic relations since 1986. Spain has an honorary consulate in Calliaqua.
- Saint Lucia: On 2 May 1986, both countries established diplomatic relations. Spain has an honorary consulate in Castries.
- Suriname: Spain immediately recognized Suriname's independence and has maintained diplomatic relations since 1976. Spain has an honorary consulate in Paramaribo.

This Embassy also acts as the Spanish representation to the Caribbean Community, the Organisation of Eastern Caribbean States and the Association of Caribbean States.

== List of ambassadors ==
Ambassador		Term	Nominated by	Appointed by	Accredited to
1	Matías Vega Guerra (Note: Resident in Caracas.)	4 December 1967 – 7 November 1970 (2 years, 34 days)	Fernando María Castiella	Francisco Franco	Solomon Hochoy
2	Enrique Domínguez Passier	8 February 1971 – 17 July 1975 (4 years, 159 days)	Gregorio López-Bravo	Francisco Franco	Solomon Hochoy
3	Juan Castrillo Pintado	25 October 1975 – 8 June 1978 (2 years, 226 days)	León Herrera Esteban (acting)	Francisco Franco	Ellis Clarke
No appointments between 1978 and 1985
4	Amaro González de Mesa y García San Miguel	10 June 1985 – 10 February 1990 (4 years, 245 days)	Fernando Morán	Juan Carlos I	Ellis Clarke
5	Alberto de Armas García	27 December 1990 – 27 March 1993 (2 years, 121 days)	Francisco Fernández Ordóñez	Juan Carlos I	Noor Hassanali
6	Aurelio Pérez Giralda	4 August 1993 – 26 November 1996 (3 years, 114 days)	Javier Solana	Juan Carlos I	Noor Hassanali
7	Miguel Ángel Fernández-Mazarambroz	26 April 1997 – 24 February 2001 (3 years, 304 days)	Abel Matutes	Juan Carlos I	A. N. R. Robinson
8	Manuel Viturro de la Torre	27 October 2001 – 3 July 2004 (2 years, 250 days)	Josep Piqué	Juan Carlos I	A. N. R. Robinson
9	Raúl Morodo	14 May 2005 – 23 September 2006 (1 year, 132 days)	Miguel Ángel Moratinos	Juan Carlos I	George Maxwell Richards
10	Fernando de la Serna Inciarte (Note: Accredited to Barbados, Grenada, Guyana, Saint Vincent and the Grenadines and Suriname.)	23 September 2006 – 9 January 2010 (3 years, 108 days)	Miguel Ángel Moratinos	Juan Carlos I	George Maxwell Richards
11	Joaquín María de Arístegui Laborde (Note: Accredited to Barbados, Grenada, Guyana, Saint Lucia, Saint Vincent and the Grenadines and Suriname.)	9 January 2010 – 21 September 2013 (3 years, 255 days)	Miguel Ángel Moratinos	Juan Carlos I	George Maxwell Richards
12	José María Fernández López de Turiso	23 November 2013 – 25 February 2017 (3 years, 94 days)	José Manuel García-Margallo	Juan Carlos I	Anthony Carmona
13	Javier María Carbajosa Sánchez	22 April 2017 – 16 December 2020 (3 years, 238 days)	Alfonso Dastis	Felipe VI	Anthony Carmona
14	Fernando Nogales Álvarez	23 December 2020 – 31 July 2024 (3 years, 221 days)	Arancha González Laya	Felipe VI	Paula-Mae Weekes
15	María Cristina Pérez Gutiérrez	31 July 2024 – present (2 years, 88 days)	José Manuel Albares	Felipe VI	Christine Kangaloo

== See also ==
- Spain–Trinidad and Tobago relations
