= List of heads of state of Trinidad and Tobago =

This is a list of the heads of state of Trinidad and Tobago, from the independence of Trinidad and Tobago in 1962 to the present day.

From 1962 to 1976, the head of state under the Trinidad and Tobago Independence Act 1962 was the queen of Trinidad and Tobago, Elizabeth II, who was also the monarch of the other Commonwealth realms. The Queen was viceregally represented in Trinidad and Tobago by a governor-general. Trinidad and Tobago became a republic under the Constitution of 1976 and the monarch and governor-general were replaced by a ceremonial president.

== Monarchy (1962–1976) ==
The succession to the throne was the same as the succession to the British throne.

| No. | Portrait | Monarch (Birth–Death) | Reign | | | Royal house | Prime minister |
| No. | Portrait | Monarch (Birth–Death) | Reign start | Reign end | Duration | Royal house | Prime minister |
|---|---|---|---|---|---|---|---|
| 1 | | Queen Elizabeth II (1926–2022) | 31 August 1962 | 1 August 1976 | 13 years, 336 days | Windsor | Williams |

=== Governor-general ===
The governor-general was the representative of the monarch in Trinidad and Tobago and exercised most of the powers of the monarch. The governor-general was appointed for an indefinite term, serving at the pleasure of the monarch. Since Trinidad and Tobago was granted independence by the Trinidad and Tobago Independence Act 1962, rather than being first established as a semi-autonomous dominion and later promoted to independence as defined by the Statute of Westminster 1931, the governor-general was to be always appointed solely on the advice of the Cabinet of Trinidad and Tobago without the involvement of the British government, with the sole exception of Solomon Hochoy, the last colonial governor, who continued as the first governor-general until he was replaced by Sir Ellis Clarke. In the event of a vacancy, the chief justice served as officer administering the government under a dormant commission.

| No. | Portrait | Governor-General (Birth–Death) | Term of office | | | Prime minister | Monarch |
| No. | Portrait | Governor-General (Birth–Death) | Took office | Left office | Time in office | Prime minister | Monarch |
|---|---|---|---|---|---|---|---|
| 1 | | Sir Solomon Hochoy (1905–1983) | 31 August 1962 | 15 September 1972 | 10 years, 15 days | Williams | Elizabeth II |
| 2 | | Sir Ellis Clarke (1917–2010) | 15 September 1972 | 1 August 1976 | 3 years, 321 days | Williams | Elizabeth II |

== Republic (1976–present) ==
Under the 1976 Constitution of the Republic of Trinidad and Tobago, the president replaced the monarch as head of state. The president was elected by Parliament for a five-year term. In the event of a vacancy, the President of the Senate served as acting president.

Status

Denotes acting President

| No. | Portrait | President (Birth–Death) | Elected | Term of office | | | Prime minister(s) |
| No. | Portrait | President (Birth–Death) | Elected | Took office | Left office | Time in office | Prime minister(s) |
|---|---|---|---|---|---|---|---|
| 1 | | Sir Ellis Clarke (1917–2010) | 1976; 1982 | 1 August 1976 | 24 September 1976 | 10 years, 230 days | Williams; Chambers; Robinson |
| 1 | | Sir Ellis Clarke (1917–2010) | 1976; 1982 | 24 September 1976 | 19 March 1987 | 10 years, 230 days | Williams; Chambers; Robinson |
| 2 | | Noor Hassanali (1918–2006) | 1987; 1992 | 20 March 1987 | 17 March 1997 | 9 years, 362 days | Robinson; Manning; Panday |
| 3 | | A. N. R. Robinson (1926–2014) | 1997 | 18 March 1997 | 16 March 2003 | 5 years, 363 days | Panday; Manning |
| 4 | | George Maxwell Richards (1931–2018) | 2003; 2008 | 17 March 2003 | 18 March 2013 | 10 years, 1 day | Manning; Persad-Bissessar |
| 5 | | Anthony Carmona (born 1953) | 2013 | 18 March 2013 | 19 March 2018 | 5 years, 1 day | Persad-Bissessar; Rowley |
| 6 | | Paula-Mae Weekes (born 1958) | 2018 | 19 March 2018 | 20 March 2023 | 5 years, 1 day | Rowley |
| 7 | | Christine Kangaloo (born 1961) | 2023 | 20 March 2023 | Incumbent | 3 years, 138 days | Rowley; Young; Persad-Bissessar |

== Standards ==
Royal standard

Governor-general's standard

Presidential standard
