= The Scout Association of Trinidad and Tobago =

- National Crest
- Headquarters: 1 St. Ann's Road, St. Ann's, Port of Spain
- Country: Trinidad and Tobago
- Founded: February 23, 1912
- Founder: Rev. Stephen Doorley
- Awarded for: Public Service
- Membership: 5,234
- Chief Scout: Christine Kangaloo, President of Trinidad and Tobago
- National Scout Commissioner: Mark Ainsley John
- President: Michael Bradshaw
- Affiliation: World Organization of the Scout Movement
- Website www.scouts.tt

The Scout Association of Trinidad and Tobago is the national Scouting organization of Trinidad and Tobago. Scouting was founded in Trinidad and Tobago in 1912 and became a member of the World Organization of the Scout Movement in 1963. The association has 5,234 members (as of 2011).

The Chief Scout is President of the Republic of Trinidad and Tobago Christine Kangaloo.

== Program and ideals ==
- Cubs-ages 7 to 11
- Scouts-ages 11 to 15
- Venturers-ages 15 to 19

As an island nation, there are also Sea Scout and Air Scout sections. The national emblem of the Scout Association of Trinidad and Tobago incorporates the coat of arms of Trinidad and Tobago.

== Organization ==
=== National Scout Council ===
The Association comprises The National Scout Council (hereinafter called the council), the executive committee of the council (hereinafter called the executive committee), the Tobago Scout and such District Councils as may be provided for in the bye-laws of the Association. The council is headed by the President of the Association. The Association comprises The National Scout Council (hereinafter called the council), the executive committee of the council (hereinafter called the executive committee), the Tobago Scout and such District Councils as may be provided for in the bye-laws of the Scout Association.

=== Membership of The National Scout Council ===
The Council shall consist of the following:

==== Ex-officio ====
(i) The Chief Scout (ii) The Deputy Chief Scout (iii) The President (iv) Any Executive of the World Scout Bureau, on invitation from the National Council (without vote) (v) The First and Second Vice-presidents (vi) The Honorary Vice-presidents (vii) The Honorary Treasurer (viii) The National Scout Commissioner (ix) Four Deputy National Scout Commissioners (x) International Commissioner (xi) Headquarters Commissioners (xii) Six Zonal Commissioners (xiii) The Honorary Commissioners (xiv) The District Commissioners (xv) The Executive Commissioners, Field Commissioners, Administrative Secretary and Assistant Field Commissioners (all without vote). (xvi) The Chairman and Secretary of each District Council in Trinidad and Tobago and the chairman and Secretary of the Tobago Scout Council.

==== Nominated ====
(i) A nominee of the Ministry to whom is assigned the responsibility for Scouting (without vote); (ii) The Minister of Education (or a nominee) of the Ministry of Education (without vote); (iii) The Chief Commissioner of the Girl Guides Association (or her nominee) (without vote); (iv) One (1) nominee of each religious council recognized by the Scout association of Trinidad and Tobago, ( e.g. I.R.O., Christian Council, ) (without vote); (v) One (1) nominee of any non-political National Association that promotes similar aims through youth or social welfare work:-Lions, Rotary, Kiwanis, Y.M.C.A., Y.W.C.A., N.P.T.A., (without vote); (vi) Warranted Leaders below the rank of Commissioner, nominated, one each by the District Councils and by the Tobago Scout Council; (vii) The President of the Friends of Scouting or a member of a similar body(without vote)

==== Elected ====
Persons elected annually to the Association from Industry, Commerce, Banking, Law, university, Transport, Publications and Medicine, Social Work, etc., whose professional or technical assistance would be of value to the Scout Movement.

=== Functions ===
The functions of the council are: (a) to promote the growth and welfare of the Scout Movement; (b) to advise the National Scout Commissioner on the administration of the Association; (c) to raise and administer the funds for the administration and development of Scouting in Trinidad and Tobago in accordance with Articles II and III; (d) in collaboration with the Trustees, to purchase, take on lease or hire, or otherwise acquire and hold any lands, buildings, easements or hereditaments, or any tenure, patents, patent rights, trademarks, and any other real or personal property; (e) to construct, provide, maintain, repair or alter any buildings, works, stores, plants and things, which may from time to time be deemed requisite, whether within Trinidad and Tobago or elsewhere, for any of the purposes of the Association; (f) to establish and maintain a National Headquarters Secretariat, to act as a channel of communication with the Tobago Scout Council, and District Councils and to maintain friendly relations with the World Scout Bureau and other National Associations of the World Organisation of the Scout Movement. (g) to promote the organisation and effective operation of District Councils and of the Tobago Scout Council, on such terms and under such bye-laws as the executive committee may from time to time require; (h) to carry on publicity, to produce publications, to organize meetings, demonstrations, rallies, conferences and other joint undertakings, where the interests of the Association are concerned; (i) on the recommendation of the National Scout Commissioner to register District Councils or to remove them from the register Article XI, 3 (c) and (h); (j) to receive reports from the National Scout Commissioner on the registration or dis-qualification of groups (Article XI, 3 (d)and (h); (k) to receive reports on the issue of warrants, signed by the Chief Scout or National Scout Commissioner and the withdrawal of any such warrants.

=== Executive committee ===
The executive committee consists of the National Scout Commissioner, his deputies, Headquarters Commissioners, Executive Commissioner, the president and vice-presidents of the association and other persons elected by the National Scout Council. There are four Deputy National Scout Commissioners each responsible for a division of the Association-Adult Resources & Training, Development & Planning, Operations and Programme. There are also Headquarters Commissioners responsible for Communications; Expansion; Cub Scouts; Scouts; Venture Scouts; Sea Scouts.

=== Zones ===
The Association is divided into six zones, North-West, North-Central, North-East, South-Central, South-West and Tobago, which are further divided into a total of 21 districts. Each District is headed by a District Commissioner reporting to the Zonal commissioner who in turn reports to DNSC (Operations).

== Scout Motto ==
Be Prepared

== Scout Promise ==
I promise to do my best to do my duty to God to serve my country to help other people and to keep the Scout law

== Awards ==
The Scout Association has various categories of awards which are presented annually by the Chief Scout at President's House. These are Awards for Long Service, Commendation, Thanks and:

=== Awards for Gallantry ===
- Joe D'Arcy Award (Red Ribbon) - Highest award for gallantry granted for special heroism or extraordinary action involving risk of life.
- Joe D'Arcy Award (Blue Ribbon) - For gallantry with considerable risk involving a display of courage and endurance, often under suffering.
- Joe D'Arcy Award (Yellow Ribbon) - For gallantry with moderate risk to person, involving a display of courage, initiative and devotion to duty.

=== Awards of Commendation ===
- Medal of Commendation - Given for good service to the movement on special occasions or for action which foster the growth and development of Scouting.

=== Awards for Good Service ===
- Golden Poui - Awarded for exceptionally distinguished services to the Movement, normally for at least fifteen years
- Silver Ibis - For specially distinguished services to the Scout Movement, normally for a period of at least ten (10) years.
- Medal of Merit - For meritorious services, normally for a period of at least seven (7) years.

== 11th Caribbean Cuboree ==
The 11th Caribbean Cuboree was held from 14 to 21 July 2007. Around 1300 Cub Scouts attended from 12 countries.

== Notable Scouts ==
- Sir Ellis Clarke, former president of the Republic
- Wendell Mottley, Olympian
- Manny Ramjohn, Olympian
- Gordon Anthony Pantin, former archbishop of Port of Spain
- Charles Jason Gordon, Archbishop of Roman Catholic Archdiocese of Port of Spain

== See also ==
- The Girl Guides Association of Trinidad and Tobago
