= Ramjohn =

Ramjohn is a name that can refer to:

- Jean Ramjohn-Richards (born 1936), First Lady of Trinidad and Tobago
- Manny Ramjohn (1915–1998), Trinidadian athlete and Scout Leader
- Ram John Holder (born 1934), Guyanese-British actor
