= Scouting and Guiding in Trinidad and Tobago =

Scouting and Guiding movement in Trinidad and Tobago

The Scout and Guide movement in Trinidad and Tobago is served by

- The Girl Guides Association of Trinidad and Tobago is a member of the World Association of Girl Guides and Girl Scouts
- The Scout Association of Trinidad and Tobago is a member of the World Organization of the Scout Movement

== International Scout units in Trinidad and Tobago ==
- In addition, there are American Boy Scouts in Port of Spain, linked to the Direct Service branch of the Boy Scouts of America, which supports units around the world.
