= San Fernando, Trinidad and Tobago =

San Fernando
- City
- City of San Fernando
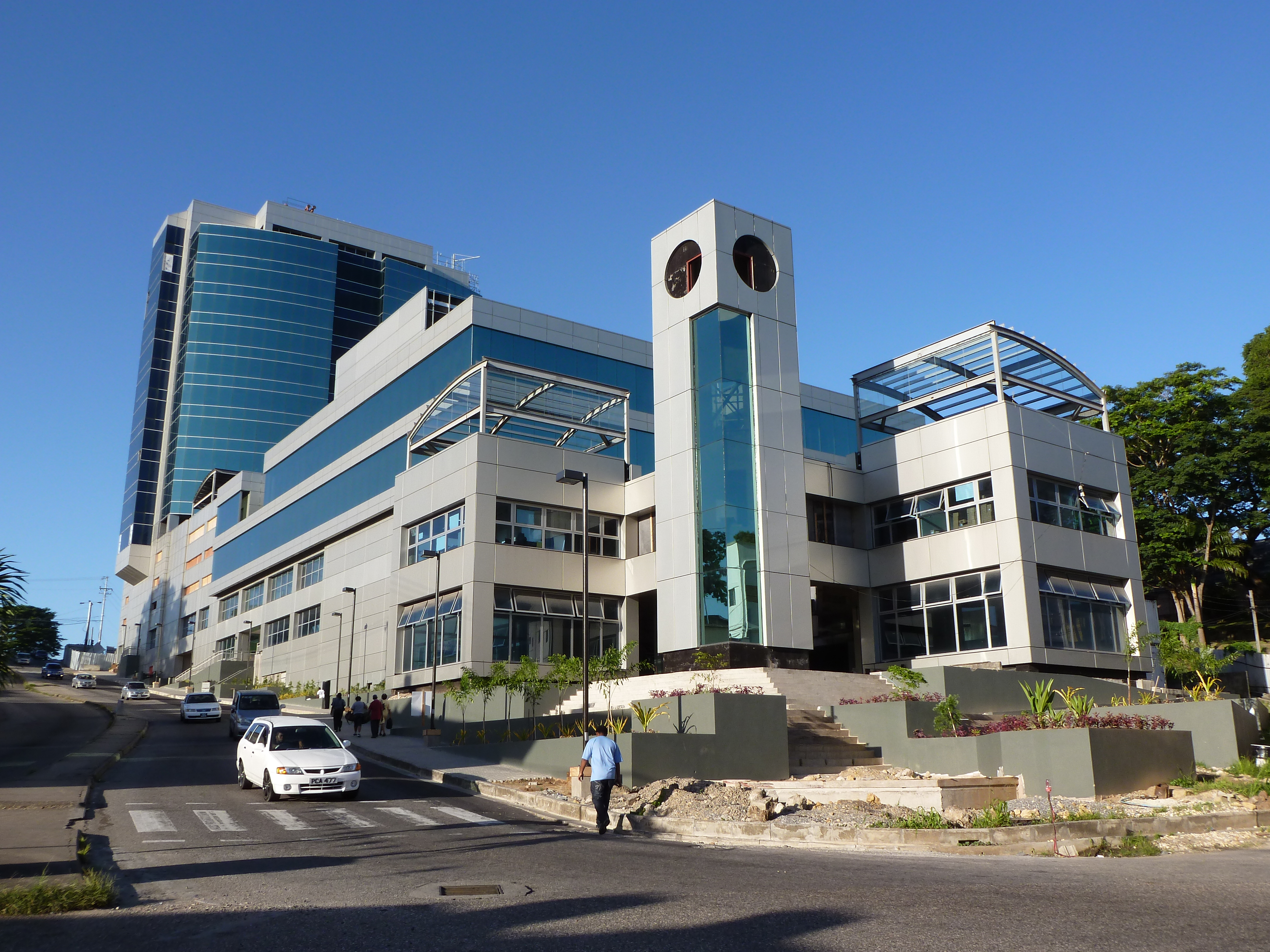
- Nicknames: Sando
- Motto: Sanitas Fortis; In a Healthy Environment We Will Find Strength.
- Location within Trinidad and Tobago Location within the Caribbean Location within North America
- Coordinates: 10°17′N 61°28′W
- Country: Trinidad and Tobago
- Jurisdiction: City of San Fernando
- Settled: 1595
- Borough: 19 August 1853
- City: 18 November 1988
- Named for: Saint Ferdinand III of Castile

Government
  - Body: San Fernando City Corporation
  - Mayor: Councillor Robert Parris, PNM
  - Deputy Mayor: Alderman Patricia Alexis, PNM
- City Corporation seats: 9 electoral districts
- House seats: 2/41

Area
  - City: 19 km^{2} (7.3 sq mi)
- Elevation: 1 m (3.3 ft)

Population (2011)
  - City: 48,838
  - Rank: 2nd
  - Density: 2,570/km^{2} (6,700/sq mi)
  - Urban: 82,997
- Time zone: UTC-4 (AST)
- Postal Code: 60xxxx, 61xxxx, 65xxxx
- Area code: (868)
- ISO 3166 code: TT-SFO
- Telephone Exchanges: 652, 653, 657, 658, 697, 831

San Fernando, officially the City of San Fernando, is the most populous city and second most populous municipality in Trinidad and Tobago, after Chaguanas. Sando, as it is known to many local Trinidadians, occupies 19 km^{2} (7.3 sq mi) and is located in the southwestern part of the island of Trinidad. It is bounded to the north by the Guaracara River, the south by the Oropouche River, the east by the Sir Solomon Hochoy Highway, and the west by the Gulf of Paria. The former borough was elevated to the status of a city corporation on 18 November 1988. The motto of San Fernando is: "Sanitas Fortis" - In a Healthy Environment We Will Find Strength. San Fernando is called Trinidad and Tobago's "industrial capital" because of its proximity to the Pointe-à-Pierre oil refinery and many other petrochemical, LNG, iron and steel and aluminium smelters in places such as Point Lisas in Couva, Point Fortin, and La Brea.

== Geography of San Fernando ==
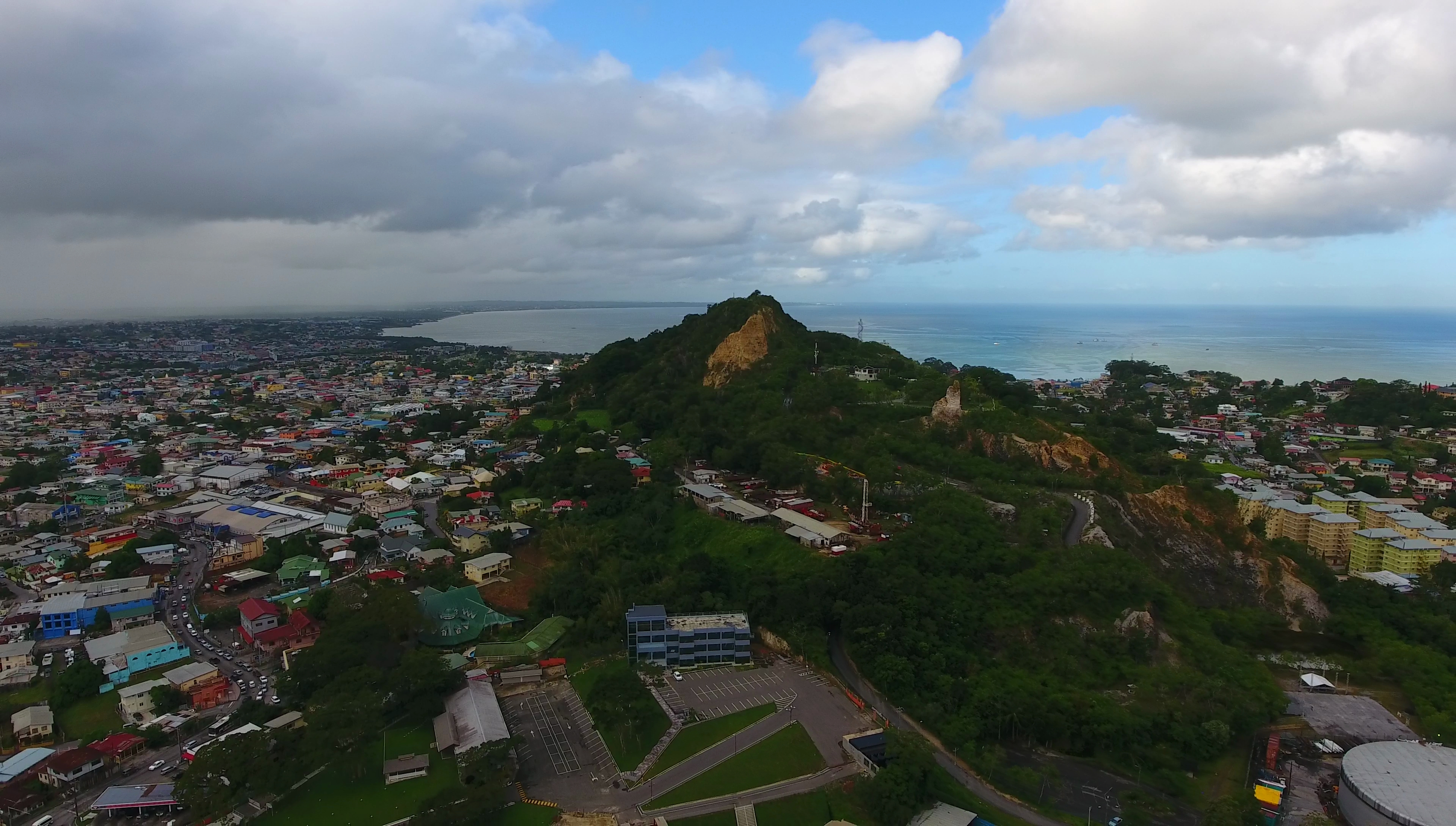
San Fernando Hill

San Fernando is a coastal city. It is bounded by the Guaracara River to the north, the Sir Solomon Hochoy Highway to the east, the Southern Main Road to the southeast, and the Oropouche River to the south. The city proper is located on the flanks of two hills – San Fernando Hill (formerly known as Naparima Hill) and Alexander Hill. Several mansions on the pinnacle of Alexander Hill house belong to some of the more prominent San Fernandian families. The Cipero, Vistabella, Marabella and Godineau Rivers all enter the sea within the city limits.

=== Cityscape ===
San Fernando, unlike Port of Spain, does not have many skyscrapers. The tallest building in the city is the 18-story San Fernando Teaching Hospital, an extension of the San Fernando General Hospital. Some notable areas within San Fernando are:

- Downtown is the commercial centre of the city. Independence Avenue, commonly known by the pre-independence name of Broadway, runs through this area of the city. High Street is the centre of most commercial activity in the city, running from Chancery Lane/Independence Avenue to Pointe a Pierre Road. This area is also home to King's Wharf and the San Fernando Waterfront, currently the subject of a major redevelopment project. The Water Taxi and Bus Terminals are located on the Waterfront. Many of the cities schools and medical centres are located in this area.
- Pleasantville is a suburban area to the east of the city, flanked by the San Fernando Bypass and the Sir Solomon Hochoy Highway respectively.
- Vistabella, Sumadh Gardens and St. Joseph are residential areas immediately to the north of the city, surrounding San Fernando Hill.
- Marabella is a town often considered part of the Greater San Fernando area. It is a major commercial centre and is especially notable for its proximity to the former Petrotrin oil refinery. It is often considered the northern limit of the city.
- Cocoyea and Mon Repos are located to the east of the city, along the San Fernando Bypass.

Some of the major roadways within the city include the San Fernando Bypass, Lady Hailes Avenue, Independence Avenue, Pointe a Pierre Road, Cipero Street, Coffee Street, Rushworth Street, Royal Road, Navet Road and the Southern Main Road.

San Fernando is especially notable for the Southern Academy for the Performing Arts (SAPA), Skinner Park, Mannie Ramjohn Stadium, King's Wharf and the San Fernando General Hospital. It is also notable for its commercial centres and malls: South Park, C3 Centre, Carlton Centre, Gulf City Mall, Gopaul Lands, and numerous smaller shopping centres and areas centered around High Street and Cipero Street.

San Fernando is sometimes said to be the Southern capital of the country, and supportive of this name is the major role the city plays as the centre of many activities for people in South Trinidad; many people go to school and work in the city every day.

=== Climate ===
San Fernando has a tropical rainforest climate, bordering on a tropical monsoon climate. Although the city does not technically qualify as having a true dry season, there is a noticeably drier stretch from February to April.

Climate data for San Fernando, Trinidad and Tobago (1991–2020 normals)
Month	Jan	Feb	Mar	Apr	May	Jun	Jul	Aug	Sep	Oct	Nov	Dec	Year
Mean daily maximum °C (°F)	30.18 (86.32)	30.47 (86.85)	30.98 (87.76)	31.81 (89.26)	31.62 (88.92)	30.80 (87.44)	30.77 (87.39)	31.24 (88.23)	31.63 (88.93)	31.47 (88.65)	30.96 (87.73)	30.36 (86.65)	31.02 (87.84)
Daily mean °C (°F)	25.58 (78.04)	25.67 (78.21)	26.18 (79.12)	27.02 (80.64)	27.23 (81.01)	26.90 (80.42)	26.77 (80.19)	27.04 (80.67)	27.23 (81.01)	27.07 (80.73)	26.76 (80.17)	26.07 (78.93)	26.63 (79.93)
Mean daily minimum °C (°F)	21.08 (69.94)	20.88 (69.58)	21.38 (70.48)	22.32 (72.18)	22.93 (73.27)	23.10 (73.58)	22.78 (73.00)	22.84 (73.11)	22.83 (73.09)	22.77 (72.99)	22.57 (72.63)	21.87 (71.37)	22.28 (72.10)
Average rainfall mm (inches)	109.69 (4.32)	72.67 (2.86)	63.84 (2.51)	91.04 (3.58)	141.60 (5.57)	261.90 (10.31)	238.16 (9.38)	259.00 (10.20)	188.43 (7.42)	215.54 (8.49)	255.61 (10.06)	189.11 (7.45)	2,086.59 (82.15)
Source: Climate Change Knowledge Portal

== Demographics ==
Historical population
Year	Pop.	±%
1980	33,395	—
1990	26,483	−20.7%
2000	48,784	+84.2%
2011	48,838	+0.1%

=== Ancestry ===
City of San Fernando racial breakdown
Racial composition	2011
African (Afro-Trinidadian/Tobagonian)	35.7%
South Asian (Indo-Trinidadian)	30.3%
Multiracial	17.3%
Dougla (South Asian and Black)	8.2%
European (White Trinidadian)	0.5%
East Asian (Chinese)	0.6%
Native American (Amerindian)	0.08%
Arab (Syrian/Lebanese)	0.9%
Other	0.02%
Not stated	6.7%

== Infrastructure ==
=== Health ===
The San Fernando General Hospital is located on Independence Avenue, close to the city center. It is considered the main trauma unit for the southern part of the island, and is administered by the Southwest Regional Health Authority (SWRHA).

There are numerous health centres in towns and villages around San Fernando that are considered to be part of the urban area. There are also a number of private medical institutions, such as:

- Southern Medical Clinic
- Surgi-Med Clinic
- Gulf View Medical Center

The San Fernando Teaching Hospital is connected to the San Fernando General Hospital by a skybridge, and is the main teaching hospital.

=== Transport ===
==== Road ====
San Fernando is dominated by private car commuting and has a very dense network of roadways. There are numerous points of entry into the city.

- The Rienzi Kirton Highway runs from Cipero Street to Ruth Avenue, where it becomes Independence Avenue.
- The San Fernando Bypass runs along the outskirts of the city, providing access to many of the suburban areas.
- The Golconda Connector Road connects the Sir Solomon Hochoy Highway to Cipero Street & the San Fernando Bypass. The Tarouba Link Road also connects the Sir Solomon Hochoy Highway to the San Fernando Bypass at the northern end of the city.
- Alternatively, traffic can exit at Corinth and enter the city via the Naparima Mayaro Road and Royal Road, or via Pleasantville.
- Lady Hailes Avenue runs from Cipero Street to Kings Wharf along the city's waterfront, connecting to the Reinzi Kirton Highway/Independence Avenue at only three points. It serves as a quicker point of entry to the city center as it terminates just outside the city center. There are plans to widen Lady Hailes Avenue into a four-lane dual carriageway, much of which has already been completed, as part of the waterfront revitalization project.

The city is often plagued by heavy traffic delays.

==== Public Transport ====
The San Fernando Bus Terminal is located to the North of Kings Wharf. There are numerous taxi stands around High Street. The water taxi service links San Fernando to Port of Spain via sea in approximately 1 hour.

==== Air ====
Like the rest of the island, the city is served by Piarco International Airport, approximately 37 km away from the city center.

== Notable people ==
- Stephen Ames (born 1964), PGA Tour golfer
- Eugene Chen (Chen Youren) (1878–1944), Foreign Minister of China
- Hasely Crawford (born 1950), Olympic gold medalist (1976)
- Annie Dookhan (born 1977), convicted felon and former chemist
- Hedy Fry, PC, MP (born 1941), Trinidadian-born Canadian politician and physician
- Assad John Haloute, Co-Founder of Chefette
- Stephen Hart, Footballer and Coach
- Noor Hassanali (1918–2006), President of Trinidad and Tobago (1987–1997)
- Stacy-Marie Ishmael, Journalist
- Rikki Jai (born 1986), chutney and chutney soca artist
- Kenny J, Calypsonian
- Barbara Jenkins, writer
- Christine Kangaloo, President of Trinidad and Tobago (2023 -)
- Christina F. Lewis (1919–1974) Pan-African community worker, trade unionist and women's rights activist
- Che Lovelace, Artist
- Clement Ligoure, Doctor
- Patrick Manning (1946–2016), Prime Minister of Trinidad and Tobago (1991–1995, 2001–2010)
- Sir Trevor McDonald (born 1939), news reporter
- Lord Melody, Calypsonian
- Mishael Morgan (born 1986), TV actress
- Manny Ramjohn (1915–1998), long-distance runner; first person to win a gold medal for Trinidad and Tobago at a major athletics event
- Raymond Ramnarine, Singer
- Jean Ramjohn-Richards (born 1936), First Lady of Trinidad and Tobago (2003–2013)
- George Maxwell Richards (1931–2018), President of Trinidad and Tobago (2003–2013)
- Adrian Cola Rienzi (Krishna Deonarine) (1905–1972), Politician
- Samuel Selvon (1923–1994), writer
- Jlloyd Samuel (1981–2018), footballer
- Jerome Tang (born 1966), head men's basketball coach at Kansas State University
- Sullivan Walker (1946–2012), film and television actor
- Edward Preston Young, Publisher
- Rodney Wilkes, Weightlifter
- Keston Bledman, Athlete
- Ade Alleyne Forte, Sprinter
- Faris Al-Rawi, Politician, Lawyer, Former MP of San Fernando West
- Tara Ramoutar (1953–2020), human rights activist.
