= 2013 Trinidad and Tobago presidential election =

- 15 February 2013
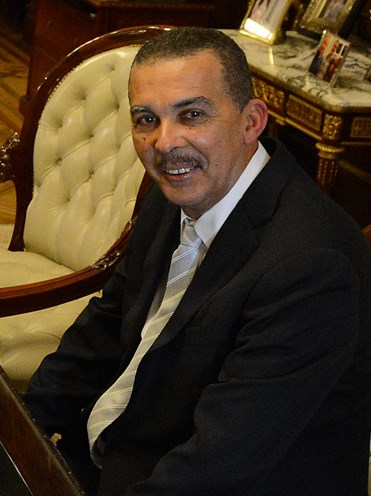
Nominee	Anthony Carmona
Party	Independent
Electoral vote	Unopposed
President before election
George Maxwell Richards
Independent
Elected President
Anthony Carmona
Independent

Indirect presidential elections were held in Trinidad and Tobago on 15 February 2013.

Prime Minister Kamla Persad-Bissessar's People's Partnership-led government nominated Anthony Carmona, a Judge of the International Criminal Court as their candidate. As Carmona was the only candidate nominated on election day, a vote did not take place and he was declared elected unopposed. He was sworn in to office on 18 March 2013 as the 5th President of Trinidad and Tobago.

== Electoral method ==
The President of Trinidad and Tobago is indirectly elected for a 5-year term by an electoral college comprising all 41 members of the House of Representatives and all 31 members of the Senate.

To win the election a candidate must gain a plurality of votes cast, whereby a quorum comprising the Speaker of the House of Representatives, 10 Senators and 12 other member of the House of Representatives must be met for the election to be considered valid. If only one candidate should be nominated to run in the election, he or she shall be considered to have been elected president without the need for a vote to take place.

== Candidates ==
=== Nominated by the Government ===
- Anthony Carmona, Judge of the International Criminal Court

== Results ==
=== Results of the election held on 15 February 2013 ===
Candidate	House of Representatives	Senate	Total	%
Anthony Carmona	Unopposed			
Invalid/blank votes				
Abstained
Not present
Total	41	31	72	100%
