= Khalid Hassanali =

Trinidad and Tobago businessman

Khalid Hassanali is the son of former President of Trinidad and Tobago, Noor Hassanali. He was the president at Petrotrin from May 2012 to October 2015.

Khalid Hassanali has three children: Behzad, Faria Hassanali with his wife Rehanna and Aadam with his previous wife Sheila.
