= Trinidad and Tobago Independence Act 1962 =

Act of the Parliament of the United Kingdom

Trinidad and Tobago Independence Act 1962 (Note: Section 5.)
- Act of Parliament
- Parliament of the United Kingdom
- Long title: An Act to make provision for, and in connection with, the attainment by Trinidad and Tobago of fully responsible status within the Commonwealth.
- Citation: 10 & 11 Eliz. 2. c. 54
- Introduced by: Reginald Maudling, Secretary of State for the Colonies (Commons)
- Territorial extent: United Kingdom; Trinidad and Tobago

Dates
- Royal assent: 1 August 1962
- Commencement: 31 August 1962 (Note: Section 1(1).)
Other legislation
Amended by	Emergency Laws (Re-enactments and Repeals) Act 1964; Finance Act 1969; Statute Law (Repeals) Act 1969; Civil Aviation Act 1971; Statute Law (Repeals) Act 1977; Interpretation Act 1978; International Organisations Act 1981; British Nationality Act 1981; Family Law Act 1986; Copyright, Designs and Patents Act 1988; Merchant Shipping Act 1995; Commonwealth Act 2002; Armed Forces Act 2006

Status: Amended

Text of statute as originally enacted

Revised text of statute as amended

Text of the Trinidad and Tobago Independence Act 1962 as in force today (including any amendments) within the United Kingdom, from legislation.gov.uk.

The Trinidad and Tobago Independence Act 1962 (10 & 11 Eliz. 2. c. 54) is an act of the Parliament of the United Kingdom that granted independence to Trinidad and Tobago with effect from 31 August 1962.

As a result of the act, Trinidad and Tobago became an independent country in the West Indies achieving independence from the United Kingdom.

== Background to enactment ==
The background to the bill came about as a result of Trinidadian opposition to inclusion within the West Indies Federation, its subsequent collapse in 1962, as well as local general strikes protesting against British colonial rule. The bill was first presented in the House of Commons of the United Kingdom as the Trinidad and Tobago Independence Bill on 4 July 1962, by Secretary of State for the Colonies, Reginald Maudling. It was passed in the House of Commons after a third reading and committee on 6 July 1962, without amendments. It entered the House of Lords on 9 July 1962 and was read by George Petty-Fitzmaurice, 8th Marquess of Lansdowne (the Minister of State for Colonial Affairs) on 16 July 1962.

It was passed in the House of Lords on 26 July 1962 without any amendments. The bill received royal assent on 1 August 1962, from Queen Elizabeth II.

== Effect ==
The act gave effect to granting independence to Trinidad and Tobago, where the British Union Jack was lowered and the new flag of Trinidad and Tobago was raised on the islands. The Queen remained as head of state as the Queen of Trinidad and Tobago, represented by a Governor-General, until 1976 when Trinidad and Tobago voted to become a republic.

== See also ==
- History of Trinidad and Tobago
- List of acts of the Parliament of the United Kingdom
