= Patricia Robinson =

Trinidadian economist and public servant (1931–2009)

Her Excellency Patricia Robinson

First Lady of Trinidad and Tobago
- In role March 19, 1997 – March 17, 2003
- President: A. N. R. Robinson
- Preceded by: Zalayhar Hassanali
- Succeeded by: Jean Ramjohn-Richards

Personal details
- Born: 31 March 1931 Port of Spain, Trinidad
- Died: 9 October 2009 (aged 78) Ellerslie Park, Trinidad and Tobago
- Spouse: A. N. R. Robinson
- Children: 2
- Education: Columbia University

Patricia Rawlins Robinson (March 31, 1931 – September 10, 2009) was a Trinidadian economist and public servant who served as the First Lady of Trinidad and Tobago from 1997 until 2003. She was married to former President and Prime Minister A. N. R. Robinson.

== Biography ==
=== Early life ===
Robinson was born Patricia Rawlins in a building on the corner of Oxford and Observatory Streets in eastern Port-of-Spain, Trinidad, on March 31, 1931. She attended Tranquility Government Primary School. Following elementary school, Robinson was awarded an exhibition, a British form of a scholarship, to St Joseph's Convent.

She worked in public service for a short time after leaving school. Robinson was accepted into Columbia University in New York City, where she studied economics. She received her master's degree in economics from Columbia University in 1957, and completed some courses towards a doctorate.

=== Career ===
Robinson returned to Trinidad and Tobago after leaving Columbia University, where she re-entered the public sector in 1958. She became an economist within the People's National Movement administration of Eric Williams, the country's first Prime Minister. She next served as the Permanent Secretary in the Ministry of External Affairs from 1965 until 1967.

In a June 1990 interview, Robinson revealed that in 1973 she had been offered a permanent position as the Director of Research at the Central Bank of Trinidad and Tobago. However, the government refused to release her from her contract, so she was unable to accept the job with the Central Bank. The government soon transferred her to a job St Ann's which she later referred to as "cold storage" because of how little there was to work on at the position. "I was allegedly on special assignment having to do with the Caribbean Investment Company or something like that. In fact, it was a nothing job and I spent from ‘73 to ‘80 there on a seven-year sabbatical." Robison believed that she had been moved to the "nothing job" because her husband, A. N. R. Robinson, had fallen out with the ruling party which led to his ministerial resignation in April 1970.

Robinson joined the National Institute of Higher Education, Research, Science and Technology (NIHERST) in 1980. She served as the NIHERST's Director of Financial Institutions. In the 1980s, Patricia Robinson also proposed a ten-year development plan to implement and strengthen the Tobago House of Assembly, which was created in 1980. Her husband, A. N. R. Robinson, had served as the chairman of the Tobago House of Assembly at the time of the governmental body's inception in 1980. She retired in March 1990.

In July 1990, members of the Jamaat al Muslimeen stormed The Red House in Port of Spain during an attempted coup. Several prominent members of the government were taken hostage during the coup attempt, including A. N. R. Robinson, who was the Prime Minister of Trinidad and Tobago at the time. At the height of the hostage crisis, a member of Jamaat al Muslimeen handed Prime Minister Robinson. The note, from Patricia Robinson, read simply "I love you." No one knows how Robinson was able to get the note to her husband during the Red House siege.

=== Death ===
Patricia Robinson died in her sleep at her home in Ellerslie Park, Trinidad and Tobago, on September 10, 2009, at the age of 78. Her family doctor pronounced her dead shortly after 6 am local time, in the presence of her daughter, Anne Margaret, and granddaughter. Robinson had been suffering from a number of ailments, including Alzheimer's disease and diabetes, during her later years and had not been seen in public in several years.

She was survived by her husband, former President A. N. R. Robinson (Late A.N.R Robinson died 9 April 2014), their two children, Anne Margaret (Bsc Mathematics) a teacher (Vice Principal), and David Robinson, an aeronautical engineer, and granddaughter, Anushka. Her funeral was held at the St. Joseph Roman Catholic Church in Scarborough, Tobago. Robinson chose to be buried in Scarborough Methodist Cemetery in Tobago, the birthplace of her husband.
