= Reema Harrysingh-Carmona =

Trinidadian and Tobagonian economist

Her Excellency Reema Harrysingh-Carmona
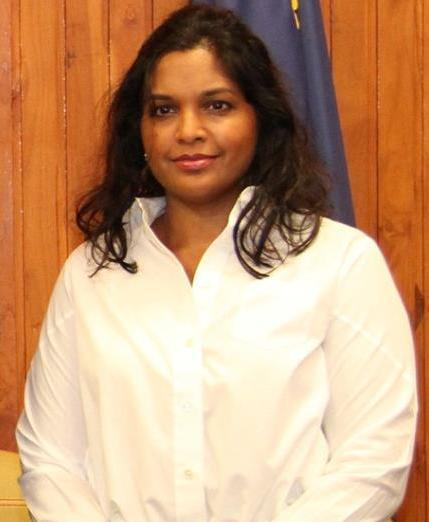

First Lady of Trinidad and Tobago
- In role March 18, 2013 – March 19, 2018
- President: Anthony Carmona
- Preceded by: Jean Ramjohn-Richards
- Succeeded by: Kerwyn Garcia (As First Gentleman, 2023)

Personal details
- Born: Reema Harrysingh; November 22, 1970 (age 55) Hoboken, New Jersey, United States
- Spouse: Anthony Carmona (m. 1997)
- Education: University of Ottawa (A.B.)
- Profession: Economics

Reema Harrysingh-Carmona (born 22 November 1970) is a Trinidadian and Tobagonian economist who served as the First Lady of Trinidad and Tobago from 2013 until 2018. She is the wife of the fifth President of the Republic of Trinidad and Tobago, Anthony Carmona.

== Early life ==
Reema Harrysingh Carmona was born in Hoboken, New Jersey. Her father, the late Cobee Harrysingh, was a retired engineering contractor and her mother is Savitri Seeteram-Harrysingh. She was the daughter of Indo-Trinidadian parents, and attended St. Brigid's Girls' Roman Catholic and Iere High School, both in Siparia, Trinidad and Tobago. After passing ninth, she passed 'O' Level from the Caribbean Examinations Council. She migrated to Canada where she attended Cairine Wilson High School in Ottawa. She subsequently attended the University of Ottawa, from which she obtained a degree of Bachelor of Science in Economics. She and the President Carmona have two children, Christian (b. 1999) and Anura (b. 2002). Her religious affiliation is Sanātanī Hinduism, although her husband President Anthony Carmona is a Roman Catholic Christian of Cocoa panyol descent.

Harrysingh-Carmona lived in the United States and Canada before relocating to Trinidad.

== Career ==
After 11 years in Canada, Harrysingh-Carmona returned to Trinidad and Tobago, where she worked both at the Point Lisas Industrial Port Development Corporation (PLIPDECO) and the Small Business Development Corporation.

== First Lady ==
She is married to Anthony Carmona, who is 17 years her senior and who served as the fifth president of the Republic of Trinidad and Tobago from 2013 to 2018. In 1997, they exchanged vows in the Catholic La Davina Pastora Church in south Trinidad. Her social work includes support for the Diabetes Association, Children Obesity prevention, and Autism Awareness, among others.
