= Manny Ramjohn =

Trinidad and Tobago distance runner

Personal information
- National team: Trinidad and Tobago
- Born: 15 November 1915 San Fernando, Trinidad and Tobago
- Died: 23 January 1998 (aged 82) San Fernando, Trinidad and Tobago
- Education: Naparima College
- Years active: 1936-1951
- Relatives: Noor Hassanali (cousin); Jean Ramjohn-Richards (cousin)
- Other interests: Scouting

Sport
- Sport: Running
- Events: 5,000 metre 10,000 metre

Manny L. Ramjohn (15 November 1915 – 23 January 1998) was an athlete from Trinidad and Tobago, born in San Fernando, and educated at Naparima College in San Fernando.

== Biography ==
A long-distance runner (5,000 m and 10,000 m), Ramjohn was the first to win a gold medal for Trinidad and Tobago at a major athletics event, the CAC Games in 1946. He was also part of the first group of five athletes to represent Trinidad and Tobago in the Olympic Games (1948). Between 1936 and 1951 he achieved 96 victories, 40 second-place and 13 third-place finishes.

Ramjohn joined the Fifth Naparima Scout Troop in 1930 and in 1937 he was elevated to King Scout and Patrol Leader. In this capacity he was one of 12 representatives from Trinidad and Tobago at the coronation of King George VI and Queen Elizabeth. He remained involved in the Scouting movement for the remainder of his life. Ramjohn was awarded the Humming Bird Medal (Silver) for Social Work and Sport by the government of Trinidad and Tobago. In 2000 the Manny Ramjohn Stadium, a new football and athletics stadium at Union Park, Marabella was named in his honour.

Ramjohn's career included the following significant accomplishments:

- 1939 White City Games, London, England - 1 mile; 3 miles
- 1946 Central American and Caribbean Games, Barranquilla, Colombia - 5,000 meters (1st, 15:54.8)
- 1948 Olympics, London, England - 5,000 meters; 10,000 meters (Did not finish)

== Awards ==
- 1948 - Wood Badge, The Scout Association of the United Kingdom
- 1973 - Medal of Merit, The Scout Association of Trinidad and Tobago
- 1979 - Silver Ibis Award for meritorious service, The Scout Association of Trinidad and Tobago
- 1980 - Silver Platter 50-Year Award, Point-a-Pierre District Scouts Association
- 1982 - Trinidad and Tobago Humming Bird Medal Silver for Social Work and Sport

Manny Ramjohn was the cousin of former President of Trinidad and Tobago Noor Hassanali and of former First Lady Dr. Jean Ramjohn-Richards, wife of President George Maxwell Richards.
