= Queen of Trinidad and Tobago =

Head of state of Trinidad and Tobago from 1962 to 1976

- Coat of arms of Trinidad and Tobago

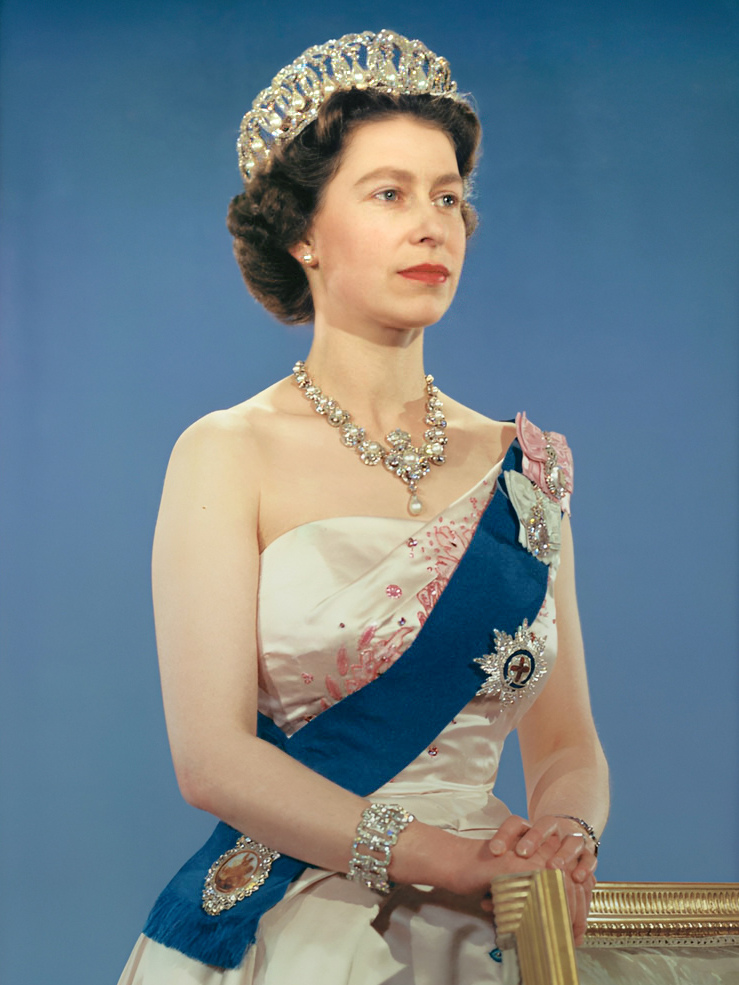
- Elizabeth II

Details
- Style: Her Majesty
- Formed: 31 August 1962
- Abolished: 1 August 1976

Elizabeth II was Queen of Trinidad and Tobago from the independence of Trinidad and Tobago on 31 August 1962 until the country became a republic on 1 August 1976. Her constitutional role as head of state was delegated to a governor-general, who acted on the advice of government ministers.

In 1974, a constitutional reform commission in Trinidad and Tobago, led by Chief Justice Sir Hugh Wooding, recommended that the country become a republic, in line with almost universal national opinion. A new constitution was adopted on 1 August 1976, and the country became the Republic of Trinidad and Tobago with a president as head of state, but remains a member of the Commonwealth.

Elizabeth II visited Trinidad and Tobago once during her tenure, in February 1966.

== History ==
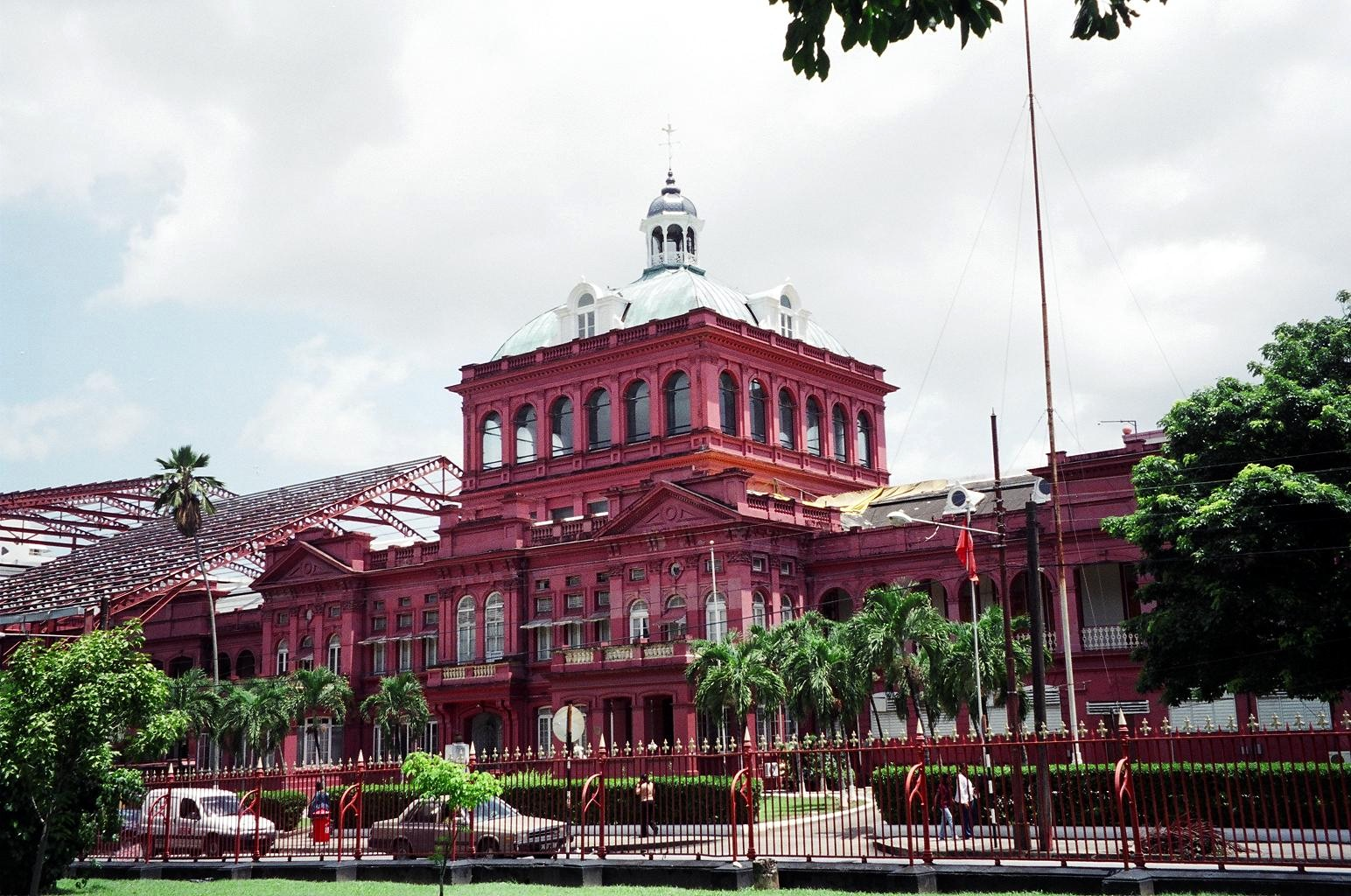
The Red House, the seat of Parliament.

At independence in 1962, Trinidad and Tobago elected to retain the monarch, Elizabeth II of the United Kingdom, as head of state instead of becoming a republic. With the collapse of the West Indies Federation, Trinidad and Tobago chose to pursue independence alone, and the government summoned a constitutional conference in May 1962. The constitutional conference which convened in May debated the merits of republicanism versus constitutional monarchy before settling on the "familiar constitutional monarchy based on the Westminster pattern". Arguments against retention of the monarch included the idea that it was a "bad form" for a newly independent country which gave the Queen "too many residual opportunities [to interfere]" and undermined the sovereignty of the new nation.

Mary, Princess Royal, represented the Queen at the independence celebrations. Just before midnight on 30 August, she joined large crowds in front of the Red House to witness the flag raising ceremony. After the ceremony, and accompanied by Prime Minister Eric Williams, the Princess Royal attended a service of dedication in Trinity Cathedral. At the Red House in Port of Spain, the Princess opened the country's first Parliament on behalf of the monarch. The Queen's message to the people of Trinidad and Tobago, read by her aunt, Mary, extended her warm welcome to the newly independent member of the Commonwealth. The Queen declared her confidence that the new nation, composed of people with many varied origins and traditions, would live harmoniously and play a full part in promoting cooperation.

== Constitutional role ==
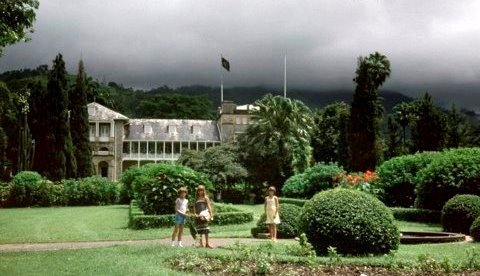
Government House, Port of Spain, the official residence of the governor-general

The 1962 Constitution of Trinidad and Tobago retained Queen Elizabeth II as "direct and immediate" head of state. This relied on the principle that the monarch was divisible, and being Queen of the United Kingdom in no way conflicted with being Queen of Trinidad and Tobago. The constitution vested executive authority in the monarch, which was exercised by the Governor-General of Trinidad and Tobago. While the Queen remained head of state, her representative, the governor-general, could only act on the advice of the prime minister. Bills passed by Parliament required royal assent by the governor-general.

=== Government ===
The government of Trinidad and Tobago was officially known as "Her Majesty's Government in Trinidad and Tobago".

The monarch of Trinidad and Tobago, the Senate, and the House of Representatives constituted the Parliament of Trinidad and Tobago. All executive powers of Trinidad and Tobago rested with the sovereign. All laws in Trinidad and Tobago were enacted only with the granting of royal assent, done by the governor-general on behalf of the sovereign. The governor-general was also responsible for summoning, proroguing, and dissolving Parliament. All Trinidadian and Tobagonian ministers were appointed by the Governor-General, acting in accordance with the advice of the Prime Minister.

The standard of the Governor-General, which featured St Edward's Crown

=== Foreign affairs ===
Representatives to foreign countries were accredited by the monarch. The letters of credence were formally issued in the name of the monarch.

=== Courts ===
Judges had to swear that they would "well and truly serve" the monarch of Trinidad and Tobago and "do right to all manner of people after the laws and usages of Trinidad and Tobago without fear or favour, affection or ill will".

The court of final appeal is the Judicial Committee of the Privy Council. The monarch, and by extension the governor-general, could also grant immunity from prosecution, exercise the royal prerogative of mercy, and pardon offences against the Crown, either before, during, or after a trial.

== Royal style and titles ==
The proclamation of the Queen's style and titles published in the Trinidad and Tobago Gazette

By a royal proclamation, published in the Trinidad and Tobago Gazette in November 1962, the monarch adopted separate style and titles in her role as Queen of Trinidad and Tobago.

Elizabeth II had the following style and titles in her role as the monarch of Trinidad and Tobago:

- 31 August 1962 – 5 October 1962: Elizabeth the Second, by the Grace of God, of the United Kingdom of Great Britain and Northern Ireland and of Her other Realms and Territories Queen, Head of the Commonwealth, Defender of the Faith
- 5 October 1962 – 1 August 1976: Elizabeth the Second, by the Grace of God, Queen of Trinidad and Tobago and of Her other Realms and Territories, Head of the Commonwealth

== Oath of allegiance ==
The oath of allegiance between 1962 and 1976 was:

"I, (name), do swear that I will be faithful and bear true allegiance to Her Majesty Queen Elizabeth the Second, Her Heirs and Successors, according to law. So help me God".

== Cultural role ==
=== The Crown and honours ===
Within the Commonwealth realms, the monarch is deemed the "fount of honour". The monarch conferred awards and honours in Trinidad and Tobago, on the advice of "Her Majesty's Trinidad and Tobago Ministers".

On the 26 August 1969, Elizabeth II, acting on the advice of the Cabinet, issued letters patent establishing a society of honour in Trinidad and Tobago, to be known as the "Order of the Trinity", for the purpose of "according recognition to citizens of Trinidad and Tobago and other persons for distinguished or meritorious service or for gallantry".

=== Personal flag ===
Personal flag of the Queen of Trinidad and Tobago

Elizabeth II had a personal flag as queen of Trinidad and Tobago. It was used for the first time when she visited the nation in 1966. The flag featured the coat of arms of Trinidad and Tobago in banner form, which depicts the colours of the national flag. The gold ships represent the three ships Christopher Columbus used on his voyage. The two birds above are hummingbirds. A blue disc of the letter "E" crowned surrounded by a garland of gold roses defaces the flag, which is taken from the personal flag of Elizabeth II.

=== Royal tour of 1966 ===
External videos
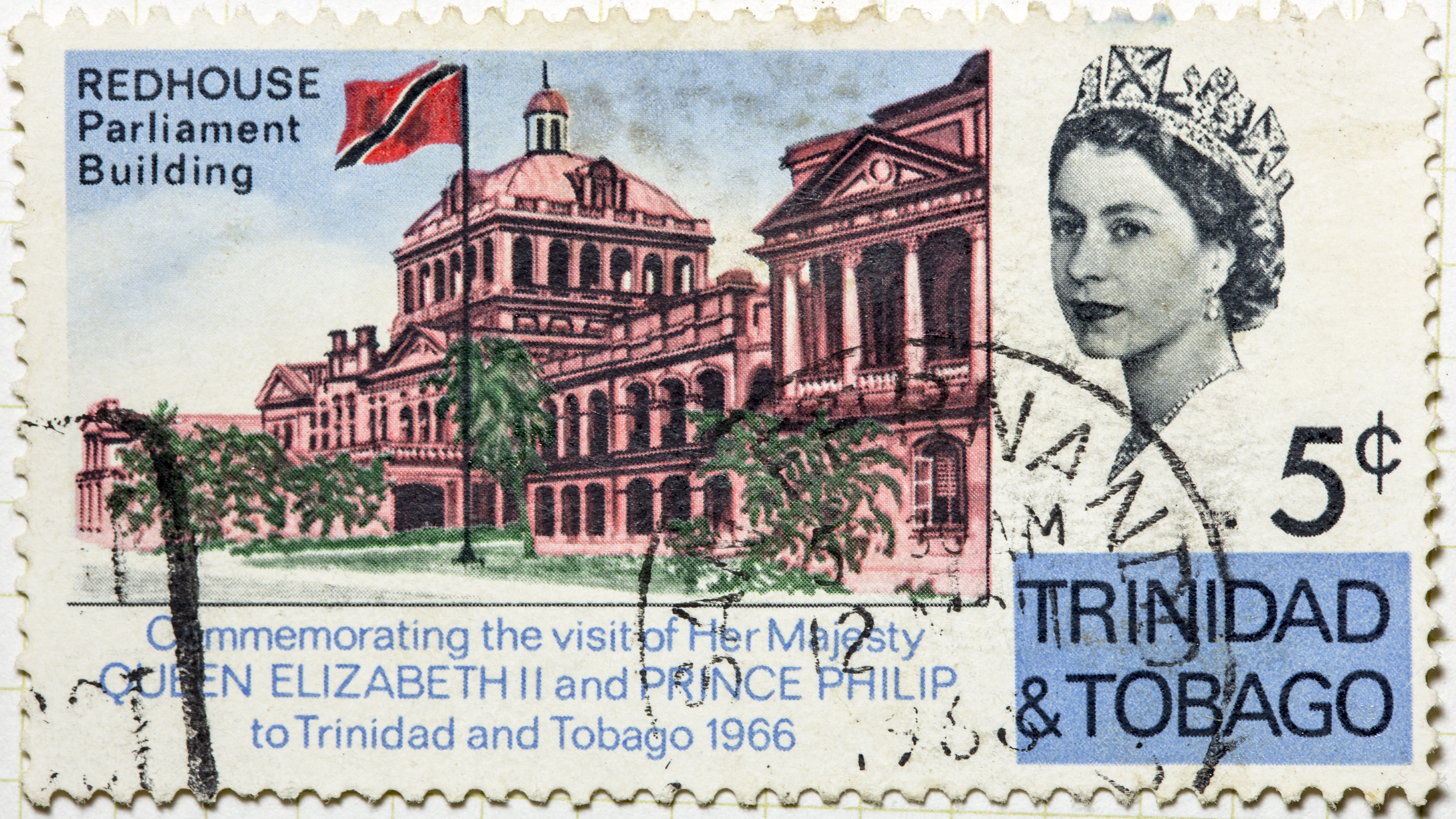
- A stamp commemorating the Royal visit
- Queen In West Indies - Technicolor (1966); Source: British Pathé.

Queen Elizabeth II visited Trinidad and Tobago from 7 to 10 February 1966. She and her consort, Prince Philip, were welcomed by tens of thousands of citizens. They were greeted on the wharf by the governor-general, Sir Solomon Hochoy, Lady Hochoy, Eric Williams and his daughter Erica.

Queen Elizabeth II travelled around the country, laying a wreath on the Cenotaph, visiting the University of the West Indies at St. Augustine, driving through San Fernando, and attending a rally of schoolchildren at Queen's Park.

On 8 February, Queen Elizabeth II opened the new session of parliament the first reigning monarch to do so. In her speech from the throne she outlined the government's plan for 1966. She prayed that God would give the strength and steadfastness to the government and the nation to keep the path they had freely elected to pursue.

Trinidad and Tobago Carnival was scheduled for a fortnight later, but the people staged a preview for the royal couple. Some of the performers represented historical characters, and Elizabeth was reportedly amused by a man dressed as King Henry VIII. Later, she said, "if this is just a preview sample the real thing must be fabulous".

On 10 February, Queen Elizabeth II and Prince Philip went on a 20-mile state drive in the island of Tobago, during which they visited Fort George, and saw the entire western section of the island. They had a buffet lunch at the Crown Point Hotel and in the afternoon attended a garden party at the Governor-General's Tobagonian residence. In the same evening, they left the country in the royal yacht for Grenada.

A set of four stamps were released to commemorate the Queen's first royal visit to the country in 1966.

== Abolition ==
On 12 December 1969, at a sitting of the House of Representatives, the prime minister moved a motion on constitutional reform. He suggested that the House approve the appointment of a joint select committee of Parliament which would include representatives of all parties to consider whether it was desirable for Trinidad and Tobago to become a republic.

On 9 October 1970, the commission was appointed. They met once on 19 October 1970. However, in its report to Parliament, the committee stated that it wasn't able to complete consideration of the subject matter entrusted to it and recommended that in the following session a committee be appointed to complete action on this matter.

Hochoy announced the Government's decision to appoint a constitutional commission, which was mandated to make recommendations for the revision of the constitution and also to produce a draft constitution based on its enquiry. Two years and six months later, in 1974, the complete report with recommendations, and the draft constitution were presented to the Governor-General on 22 January.

On 13 June 1975, Williams laid the draft constitution of the republic in Parliament. Both houses of Parliament passed the Constitution of the Republic of Trinidad and Tobago Act on 26 March 1976. Just before the voting, most of the opposition leaders left the chamber in protest. There was also an attempt to stop the Governor-General's assent to the bill, through a motion filed by a private citizen in the San Fernando Supreme Court, but it failed. The bill was assented to on 29 March by the Governor-General.

The new constitution was adopted on 1 August 1976, when Trinidad and Tobago became a republic within the Commonwealth with a non-executive president as its head of state.

Upon proclamation of the republic, the monarchy and the post of governor-general were abolished. Sir Ellis Clarke, the last governor-general, was sworn in as the country's first president.

== See also ==
- Carib Queen
