= List of ambassadors of Trinidad and Tobago to the United States =

Coordinates: 38.9075°N 77.038889°W

Ambassador of the Republic of Trinidad and Tobago to the United States
- Style: His/Her Excellency
- Residence: Embassy of Trinidad and Tobago in Washington, D.C.
- Inaugural holder: Ellis Clarke
- Formation: 27 October 1962
- Website: www.foreign.gov.tt/embwashington

The Trinidadian and Tobagonian ambassador in Washington, D.C. is the official representative of the government of the Republic of Trinidad and Tobago to the government of the United States and representative to the Organization of American States.

== List of representatives ==
Diplomatic agrément	Diplomatic accreditation	Ambassador	Observations	List of prime ministers of Trinidad and Tobago	List of presidents of the United States	Term end
31 August 1962			Embassy opened	Eric Williams	John F. Kennedy	
21 September 1962	27 October 1962	Ellis Clarke		Eric Williams	John F. Kennedy	
14 August 1973	9 November 1973	Victor Chrysostom Mclntyre		Eric Williams	Richard Nixon	
9 March 1983	7 April 1983	James O'Neil Lewis		George Chambers	Ronald Reagan	
11 September 1987	20 October 1987	John Reginald Phelps Dumas	(* 4 April 1935) son of Reginald and Adeline Dumas.: 1960 married Joyce Constance Ogilvie they have one daughter.; Education: Chaguanas Govt. School, Queen's Royal College, Cambridge University, Graduate Institute of International and Development Studies, B.A.; 1959-1960 Admin. Cadet, Federal Govt, of West Indies, .; 1962-1963: Admin. Asst., Trinidad & Tobago Govt., .; 1962-1963: Third Sec. Washington D.C.. .; 1963-1965: Second Secretary Washington D.C., U.SA., .; former Counsellor II, Trinidad and Tobago Embassy in Addis Ababa, Ethiopia; seconded as Programmes Director in Diplomacy, Carnegie Endowment for International Peace, New York.; Committee member of Cambridge West Indian University	A. N. R. Robinson	Ronald Reagan	
25 January 1989	7 February 1989	Angus Albert Khan		A. N. R. Robinson	George H. W. Bush	
3 September 1992	18 November 1992	Corinne Averille McKnight		Patrick Manning	George H. W. Bush	
17 December 1997	16 March 1998	Michael Arneaud		Basdeo Panday	Bill Clinton	
13 January 2003	26 February 2003	Marina Valere		Patrick Manning	George W. Bush	
23 May 2008	6 June 2008	Glenda Patricia Morean-Phillip		Patrick Manning	George W. Bush	
14 February 2011	23 February 2011	Neil Nadesh Parsan		Kamla Persad-Bissessar	Barack Obama	Embassy of Trinidad and Tobago in Washington, D.C.
