= The Girl Guides Association of Trinidad and Tobago =

- Country: Trinidad and Tobago
- Founded: 1914
- Membership: 3,065
- President: Maxine Richards
- Affiliation: World Association of Girl Guides and Girl Scouts
- Website http://www.girlguidestt.org/

The Girl Guides Association of Trinidad and Tobago is the national Guiding organization of Trinidad and Tobago. It serves 3,065 members (as of 2003). Founded in 1914, the girls-only organization became a full member of the World Association of Girl Guides and Girl Scouts in 1963.

In 2008, the president of the association was Maxine Richards. Currently (2023), the Chief Commissioner is Jacqueline Dolly.

The first meeting of the Girl Guides was held at the Saint Ann's Church hall on Oxford Street, Port-of-Spain on 8 June 1914 by Mrs. Havelock, wife of a Methodist minister. By Christmas of that year there were four companies with a total of 100 Guides and nine Guiders.

== See also ==
- The Scout Association of Trinidad and Tobago
