= Jean Ramjohn-Richards =

First Lady of Trinidad and Tobago (born 1936)

Her Excellency Jean Ramjohn-Richards

First Lady of Trinidad and Tobago
- In role March 17, 2003 – March 18, 2013
- President: George Maxwell Richards
- Preceded by: Patricia Robinson
- Succeeded by: Reema Harrysingh-Carmona

Personal details
- Born: 1936 (age 89–90) San Fernando, Trinidad and Tobago
- Spouse: George Maxwell Richards (until 2018; his death)
- Relations: Manny Ramjohn (cousin); Noor Hassanali (cousin)
- Children: 2 children

Jean Ramjohn-Richards (born 1936) is a Trinidadian doctor and the former First Lady of Trinidad and Tobago from 2003 until 2013. She was born in San Fernando and was educated at Naparima Girls' High School and Naparima College before attending medical school in Ireland. She is married to former president George Maxwell Richards and has two children. She is a cousin of former president Noor Hassanali and Olympian Manny Ramjohn.

In addition to her duties as wife of the President, Dr. Ramjohn-Richards worked as an Anaesthetist at the Mount Hope Maternity Hospital at Champs Fleurs, Trinidad, where she has practiced since its opening in 1980. Her husband took office in March 2003.
