= President's House, Trinidad and Tobago =

President's House
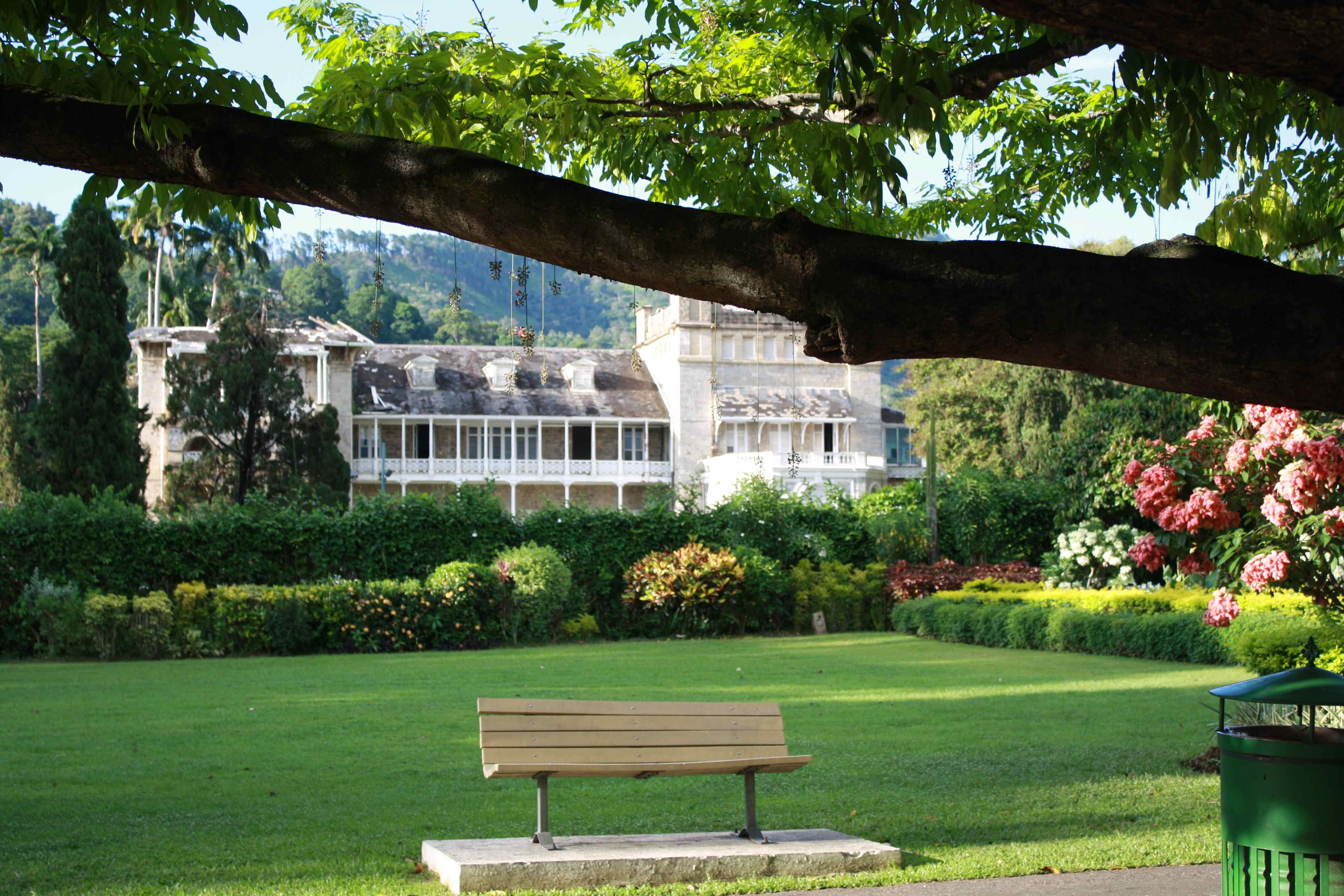
- President's House from the Royal Botanic Gardens
- Interactive map of the President's House area

General information
- Type: Official residence
- Location: Port of Spain, Trinidad, Trinidad and Tobago
- Coordinates: 10.677646°N 61.511979°W
- Current tenants: President of Trinidad and Tobago
- Inaugurated: 1876; 150 years ago
- Owner: Government of Trinidad and Tobago

President's House is the official residence of the president of Trinidad and Tobago, located in the capital city Port of Spain, Trinidad and Tobago. It is next to the Royal Botanic Gardens.

== History ==
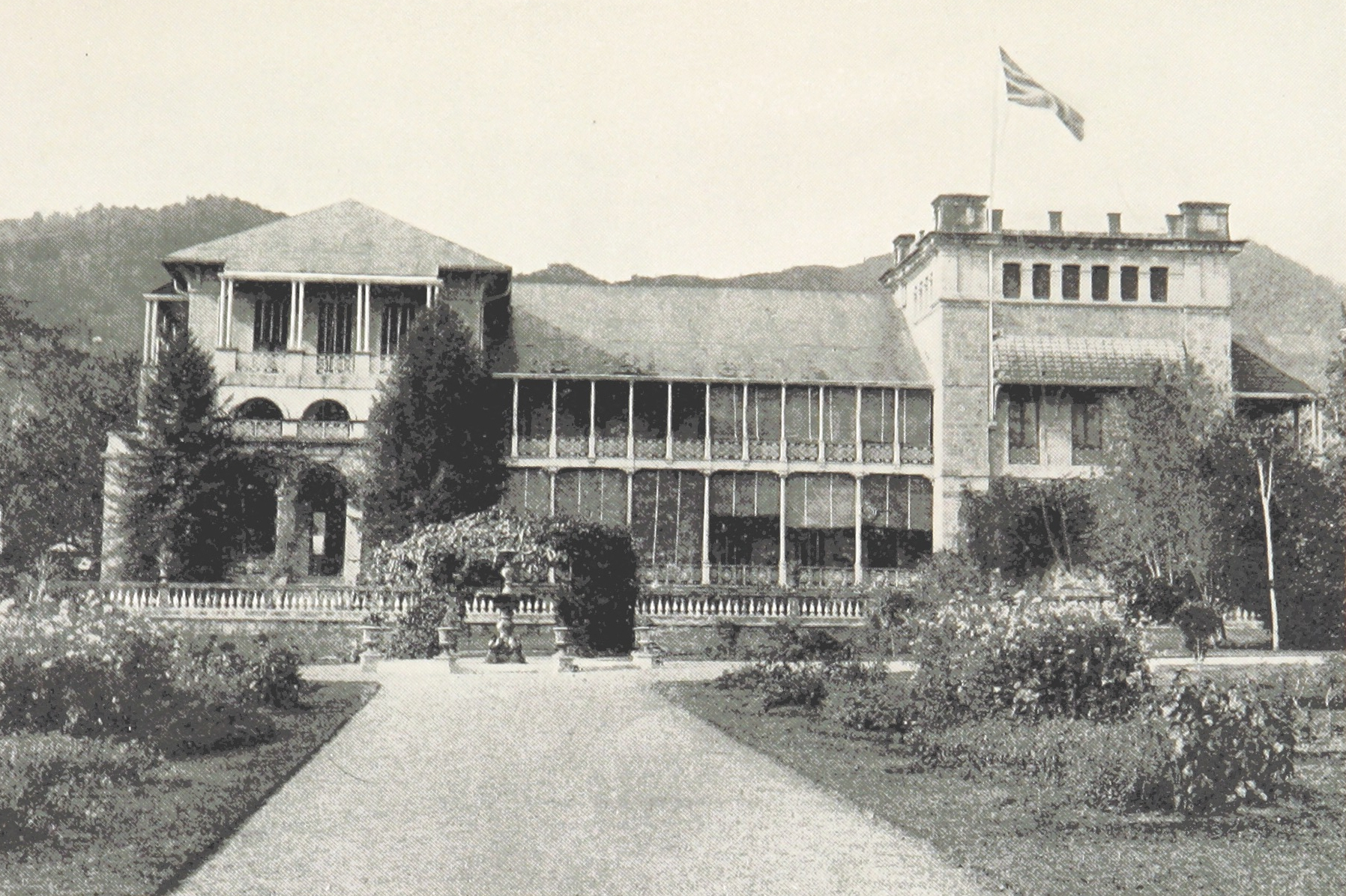
In 1895, when it was the Governor's House (Government House)

A previous building on the site, known as "The Cottage," had been used as the governor's residence since 1867. This residence, replacing it, was built in 1876. The stone facade is local blue limestone. The roof is covered with Welsh Dutchess slate. The building contains Victorian columns and railings with Victorian Italianate style arched portals and loggias.

The mansion was used as the home of the governor of Trinidad and Tobago from 1876 to 30 April 1958, when it became the residence of the governor-general of the West Indies Federation.

Trinidad and Tobago attained independence on 31 August 1962. The mansion was then used as a museum and art gallery for a period, until it again became the residence of the governors-general.

When Trinidad and Tobago became a republic in 1976, the governor-general's mansion was subsequently designated as "The President's House", and became the residence of the president of the Republic of Trinidad and Tobago.

== Present day ==
Today, as well as being the president's private residence, the mansion is used for national awards and swearing-in ceremonies, as well as diplomatic receptions. The president's office is located in a separate building on the grounds of the mansion.
