= Ellis Clarke =

Last Governor-General and first President of Trinidad and Tobago

His Excellency Sir Ellis Clarke TC GCMG
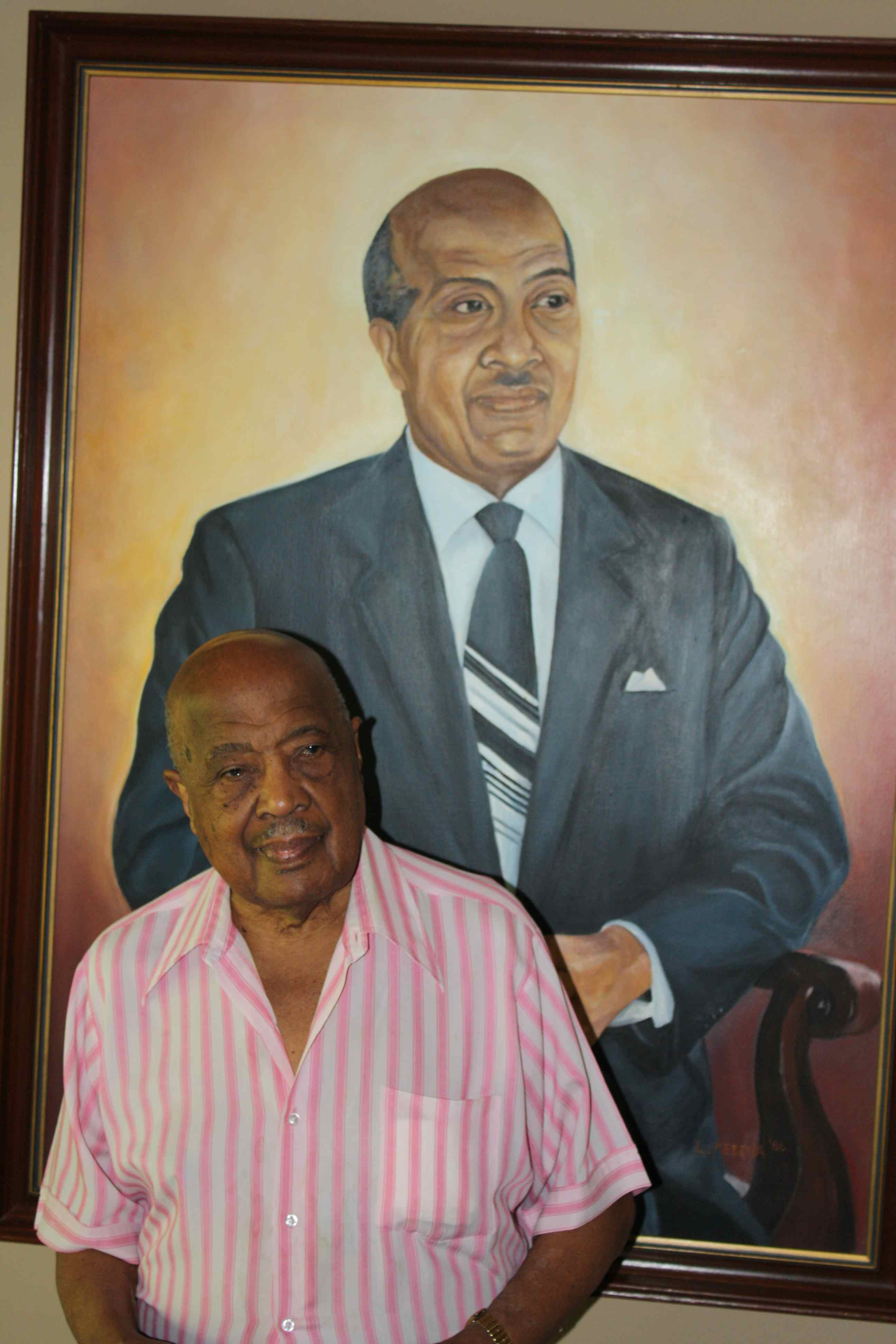
- Behind himself in 2010

1st President of Trinidad and Tobago
- In office 1 August 1976 – 19 March 1987
- Prime Minister: Eric Williams; George Chambers; A. N. R. Robinson
- Preceded by: Elizabeth II as Queen of Trinidad and Tobago
- Succeeded by: Noor Hassanali

2nd Governor-General of Trinidad and Tobago
- In office 15 September 1972 – 1 August 1976
- Monarch: Elizabeth II
- Prime Minister: Eric Williams
- Preceded by: Solomon Hochoy
- Succeeded by: Position abolished (himself as President of Trinidad and Tobago)

Personal details
- Born: 28 December 1917 Belmont, Port of Spain, Trinidad and Tobago
- Died: 30 December 2010 (aged 93) Maraval, Trinidad and Tobago
- Spouse: Ermyntrude Hagley (m. 1952; died 2002)
- Education: University College London

Sir Ellis Emmanuel Innocent Clarke TC GCMG (28 December 1917 – 30 December 2010) was a Trinidadian lawyer, politician, and diplomat who served as the last Governor-General of Trinidad and Tobago from 1972 to 1976 and the first President of Trinidad and Tobago from 1976 to 1987. He was one of the main architects of Trinidad and Tobago's 1962 Independence constitution.

== Early life ==
Ellis Clarke attended Saint Mary's College in Port of Spain, winning an Island Scholarship in Mathematics in 1938. He attended University College London of the University of London, where he received a Bachelor of Law degree and was called to the bar at Gray's Inn. He returned to Port of Spain in 1941, taking up private practice there.

== Political career ==
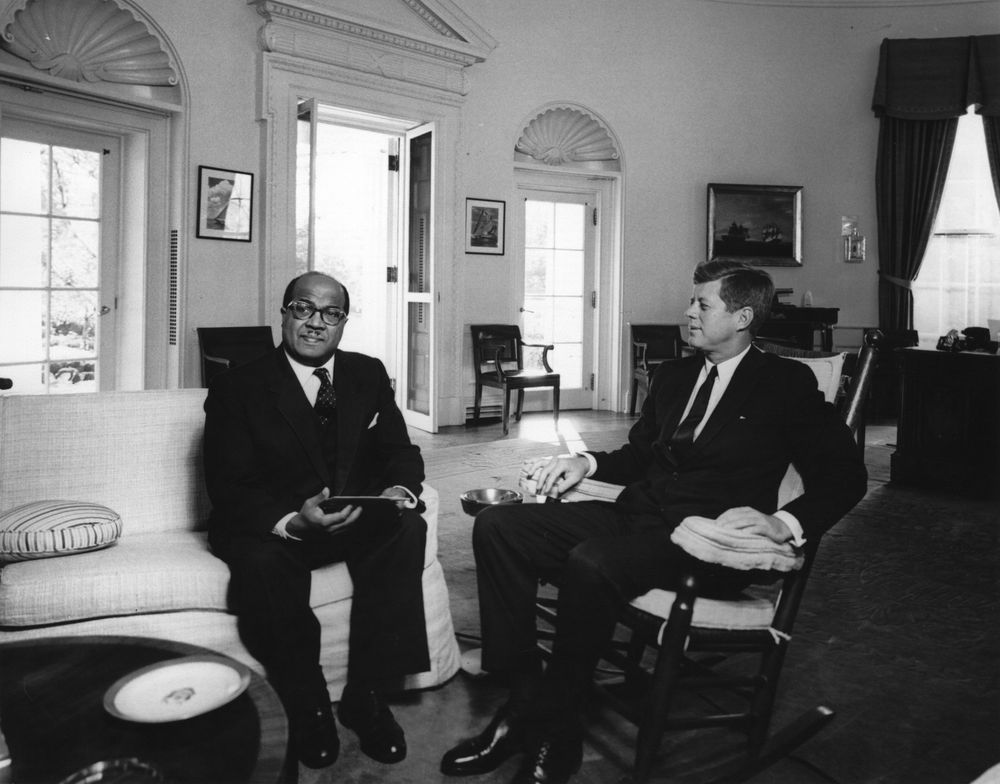
President Sir Ellis Clarke (left) meeting with U.S. President John F Kennedy (right) while serving as Ambassador to the United States

Clarke served as Solicitor-General from 1954 to 1956, Deputy Colonial Secretary 1956–57, and Attorney General 1957–62. After Independence in 1962, he served as Ambassador to the United States, Canada and Mexico, and Permanent Representative to the United Nations. At the time, he participated in the 2nd Summit of the Non-Aligned Movement in Cairo in 1964.

In 1972, he succeeded Sir Solomon Hochoy as Governor General. When Trinidad and Tobago became a republic in 1976, Clarke was unanimously elected the country's first President by the electoral college, which comprised the elected members of both Houses of Parliament. He was re-elected by the People's National Movement-controlled electoral college and completed his second term in 1987. Disagreements with the new National Alliance for Reconstruction government resulted in Clarke's decision not to seek a third term. He was succeeded by Noor Hassanali.

Clarke was invested as a Companion of St Michael and St George by Queen Elizabeth II in 1960 and was awarded a knighthood as a Knight Grand Cross of that order in 1972. Although he ceased to use the title Sir after the country became a republic, after retirement from the presidency he re-adopted his title and was generally referred to as "Former President, Sir Ellis Clarke" or Sir Ellis.

He was married to Lady Ermyntrude Clarke (1921–2002) for almost fifty years. They had three children: Peter Ellis Clarke (married to Suzanne Traboulay, a former beauty queen), Margaret-Ann (married to Gordon Fisken) and Richard (who died as a young child).

Ellis Clarke was one of six experts worldwide asked to submit reports to Australia's Republic Advisory Committee in 1993 detailing his country's experience in moving from a constitutional monarchy to a republic.

== Death and funerals ==
On 24 November 2010, Clarke suffered a massive stroke. He died on 30 December 2010, two days after his 93rd birthday. Clarke was laid to rest on 7 January 2011. A private funeral was held at the Church of the Assumption on Maraval Road in Port of Spain. Both his living children as well as his four grandsons gave tributes.

Following the private funeral, a state funeral was held at the National Academy for the Performing Arts Building situated at the Queen's Park Savannah. It was an inter-religious celebration at which the President, Prime Minister and Chief Justice paid tributes. In attendance were members of Parliament, senators, members of the diplomatic corps, and foreign heads of state and dignitaries. A procession through Port of Spain followed the service. Sir Ellis'a coffin, draped in a Trinidad and Tobago flag, was set atop a cannon and pulled by a military vehicle. The procession concluded at Lapeyrouse Cemetery, where he was buried at the Clarke family plot, which burial was attended by family and friends.

Political offices
| Preceded by Sir Solomon Hochoy | Governor-General of Trinidad and Tobago; 1972–1976 | Office abolished |
| Preceded by Elizabeth II as Queen of Trinidad and Tobago | President of Trinidad and Tobago; 1976–1987 | Succeeded by Noor Hassanali |
