= Noor Hassanali =

President of Trinidad and Tobago from 1987 to 1997

His Excellency Noor Hassanali TC
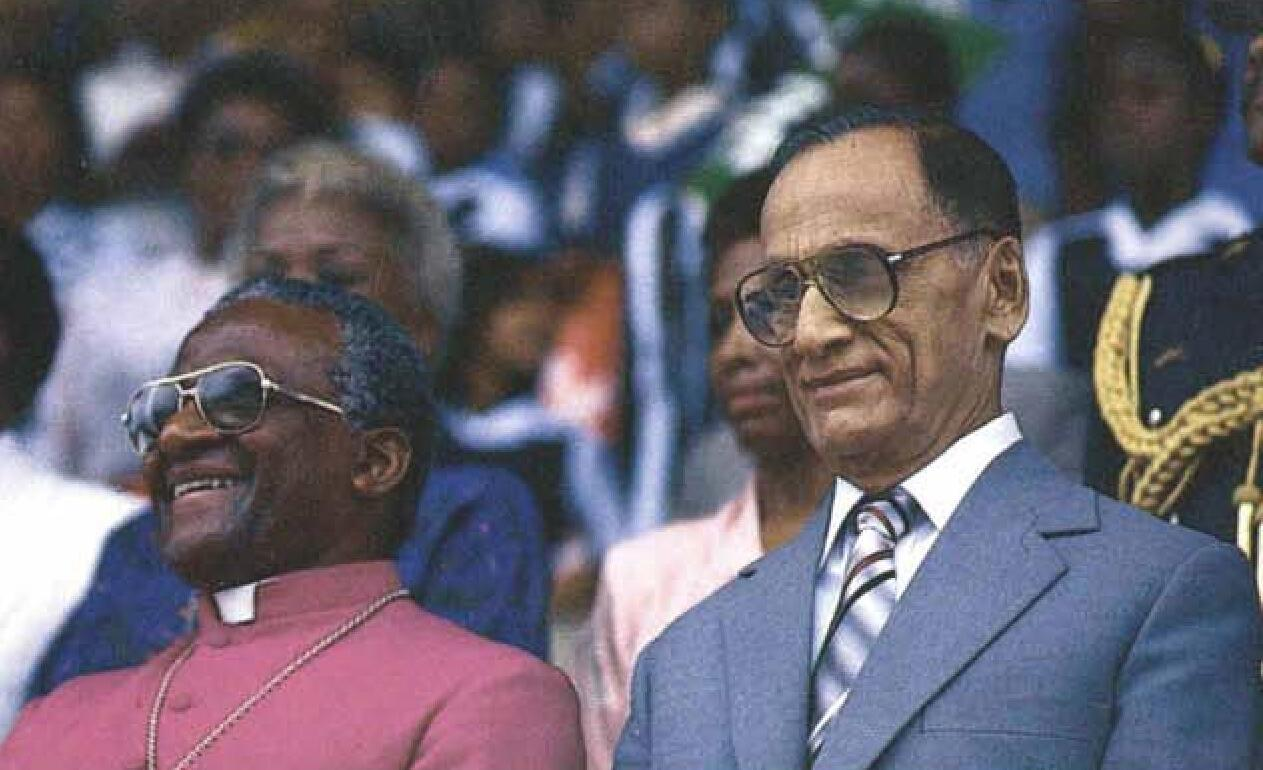
- Hassanali with Desmond Tutu in 1987

2nd President of Trinidad and Tobago
- In office 20 March 1987 – 17 March 1997
- Prime Minister: A. N. R. Robinson; Patrick Manning; Basdeo Panday
- Preceded by: Ellis Clarke
- Succeeded by: A. N. R. Robinson

Personal details
- Born: Noor Mohamed Hassanali; 13 August 1918 San Fernando, Trinidad and Tobago
- Died: 25 August 2006 (aged 88) Westmoorings, Diego Martin, Trinidad and Tobago
- Resting place: Western Cemetery, St. James, Port of Spain, Trinidad and Tobago
- Party: Independent
- Spouse: Zalayhar Mohammed (m. 1952)
- Children: Khalid; Amena
- Relatives: Jean Ramjohn-Richards (cousin); Manny Ramjohn (cousin)
- Occupation: Politician; lawyer; magistrate

Noor Mohamed Hassanali (Note: pronounced [nuːrə moːɦəmməd̪ə ɦəsənɑːliː]) TC (13 August 1918 – 25 August 2006) was a Trinidadian lawyer, judge and politician who served as the second president of Trinidad and Tobago from 1987 to 1997. A retired high-court judge, he was the first person of Indian descent and first Muslim president of Trinidad and Tobago, and the first Muslim head of state in the Americas.

Hassanali was president during the 1990 Jamaat al Muslimeen coup attempt, in which an Islamist group bombed the nation's police headquarters, stormed its Parliament and took the prime minister and his Cabinet hostage. Hassanali, who was visiting London at the time and remained there until the government regained control, aided in calming his fellow citizens and getting rule of law and democracy back on track on his return. His tenure, though largely ceremonial, was noted for its efforts to bridge the nation's racial divide and building consensus between various political parties.

== Biography ==
The sixth of seven children, Hassanali was born into a Indo-Trinidadian Muslim family in San Fernando, Trinidad and Tobago. He attended the Corinth Canadian Mission Primary School and Naparima College. After graduating he taught at Naparima from 1938 to 1943. In 1943 he travelled to Canada, where he studied at Victoria College, University of Toronto.

Hassanali was described as "one of the most neutral, reserved, and dignified figures in the history of T&T politics". When he was inaugurated as president in 1987 he was described as "a person of impeccable credentials who has a reputation for honesty and humility of the highest order." As a Muslim, Hassanali chose not to serve alcoholic beverages at President's House. Despite reservations on the part of Prime Minister A. N. R. Robinson, the decision was never seen as controversial by the public.

Hassanali succeeded acting president Ellis Clarke (1976–1987) and was himself succeeded by Arthur N. R. Robinson (president 1997–2003).

Hassanali died on 25 August 2006 at his home in Westmoorings, Trinidad and Tobago, at the age of 88. He had suffered from hypertension for the preceding year. Hassanali was buried later in the day, following Islamic rites, in the Western Cemetery in Saint James, Trinidad and Tobago.

== Awards and honours ==
- Trinidad and Tobago
  - Trinity Cross

== Notes ==
Political offices
Preceded by Ellis Clarke	President of Trinidad and Tobago; 1987–1997	Succeeded by A. N. R. Robinson
