= Solomon Hochoy =

Trinidadian colonial governor

His Excellency Sir Solomon Hochoy TC GCMG GCVO OBE
- Hochoy in 1972

1st Governor-General of Trinidad and Tobago
- In office 31 August 1962 – 15 September 1972
- Monarch: Elizabeth II
- Prime Minister: Eric Williams
- Preceded by: Himself (as Governor)
- Succeeded by: Ellis Clarke

17th Governor of Trinidad and Tobago
- In office 4 July 1960 – 31 August 1962
- Monarch: Elizabeth II
- Premier: Eric Williams
- Preceded by: Edward Beetham
- Succeeded by: Himself (as Governor-General)

Personal details
- Born: 20 April 1905 Colony of Jamaica (present-day Jamaica)
- Died: 15 November 1983 (aged 78) Blanchisseuse, Trinidad and Tobago
- Party: Independent
- Spouse: Thelma Huggins Hochoy

Sir Solomon Hochoy TC GCMG GCVO OBE (20 April 1905 – 15 November 1983) was the last colonial governor of Trinidad and Tobago and the first governor-general upon the country's independence in 1962. He was the first ethnically Han Chinese and nationally Caribbean person to become Governor-General in the Commonwealth.

== Life and career ==
Of Hakka Han Chinese descent, Hochoy's family emigrated to Trinidad from Jamaica when he was two years old. He spent his early years in Blanchisseuse. After rising through the civil service, Hochoy was appointed the first non-European Governor in the entire British Empire in 1960, and the first ethnic Chinese to be Governor.

When Trinidad and Tobago became independent in 1962 Hochoy was appointed Governor General. He retired from that position in 1972 and was succeeded by Ellis Clarke. After retirement he returned to Blanchisseuse where he spent the remainder of his life.

== Family ==
He was married to Thelma Huggins, a social activist.

== Legacy ==
The Sir Solomon Hochoy Highway and the Solomon Hochoy Trophy (for football) are named in his honour.

Government offices
Preceded by Sir Edward Betham Beetham	Governor of Trinidad and Tobago; 1960–1962	Succeeded by —
Preceded by —	Governor-General of Trinidad and Tobago; 1962–1972	Succeeded by Sir Ellis Clarke
