= George Maxwell Richards =

President of Trinidad and Tobago from 2003 to 2013

His Excellency George Maxwell Richards TC CM
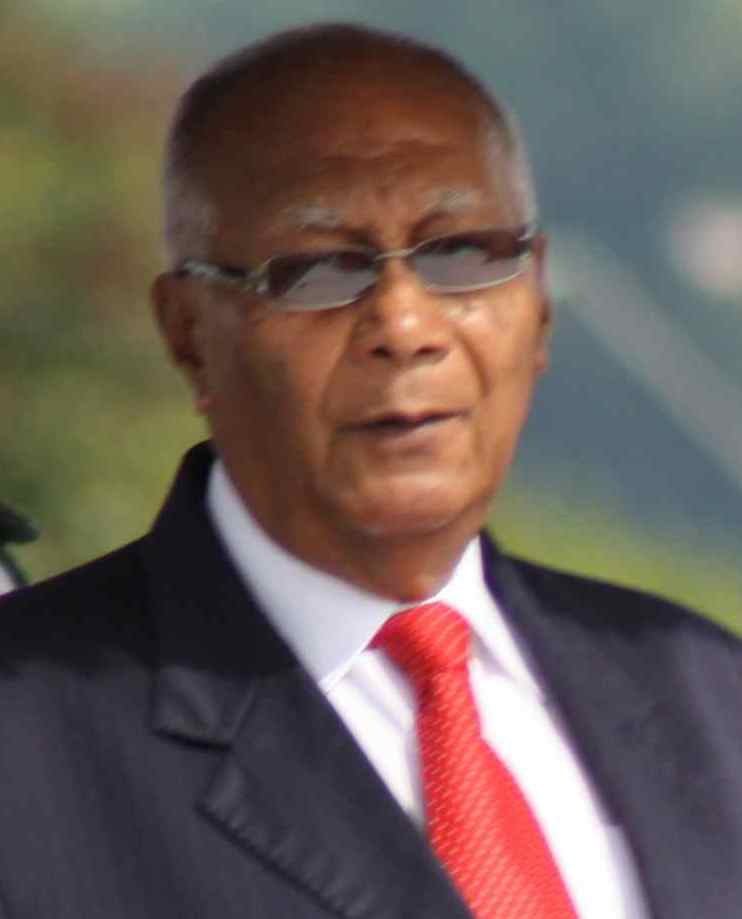

4th President of Trinidad and Tobago
- In office 17 March 2003 – 18 March 2013
- Prime Minister: Patrick Manning; Kamla Persad-Bissessar
- Preceded by: A. N. R. Robinson
- Succeeded by: Anthony Carmona

Personal details
- Born: George Maxwell Richards; 1 December 1931 San Fernando, Trinidad and Tobago
- Died: 8 January 2018 (aged 86) Port of Spain, Trinidad and Tobago
- Cause of death: Heart failure
- Party: Independent
- Spouse: Jean Ramjohn
- Education: University of Manchester; Pembroke College, Cambridge
- Occupation: Politician; engineer

HE George Maxwell Richards TC CM (1 December 1931 – 8 January 2018) was a Trinidadian politician who served as the fourth president of Trinidad and Tobago, from 2003 to 2013. He was the first president and head of state in the Anglophone Caribbean to have Indigenous ancestry.

A chemical engineer by training, Richards was Principal of the St. Augustine campus of the University of the West Indies in Trinidad from 1984 to 1996. He previously worked for Shell Trinidad Ltd before joining the University of the West Indies in 1965. He was sworn into office as president on 17 March 2003 for a five-year term.

== Early life and education ==
Richards was born at his family's home in San Fernando in South Trinidad in 1931 as one of five children in the family. He was of Amerindian and Chinese descent. His father, George Richards, was a barrister while his mother, Henrietta Martin was a housewife and teacher. He received his primary education there before winning an exhibition (scholarship) to attend Queen's Royal College in Port of Spain. From May 1950 to September 1951, he worked for the United British Oilfields of Trinidad (precursor to Shell Trinidad Ltd.) at Point Fortin. He received a scholarship from them to study chemical engineering.

Richards then attended the University of Manchester (UMIST), where he took a BEng degree (1955) and an MEng degree (1957). He subsequently obtained a PhD degree in chemical engineering from the University of Cambridge (Pembroke).

== Early career ==
Richards returned to Trinidad and worked for Shell Trinidad Ltd from 1957 to 1965 before joining the Department of Chemical Engineering at the University of the West Indies, eventually attaining the post of Professor of Chemical Engineering in October 1970. From August 1980 to May 1985, Richards served as Pro-Vice-Chancellor and Deputy Principal of the University. He served as Acting Principal of the St. Augustine Campus from October 1984 to May 1985, and was confirmed in the position in 1985.

Richards served as Principal through the turbulent period in 1988 when the government slashed the university's budget by 30% and instituted a cess on university students (effectively raising tuition from TT$120 to $3000 overnight).

Richards managed to keep the university afloat through this difficult period and retired as Principal in November 1996 although he continued to teach as professor emeritus until he was elected president. Richards also served on the Boards of many Trinidad and Tobago companies including that of the state-owned oil company, Trintoc (now Petrotrin), the National Gas Company and the Trinidad Publishing Company.

== Presidency ==
Although the position of president is a primarily ceremonial one, Richards had been outspoken in his criticism of the upsurge of crime in Trinidad and Tobago. He was also well known for his involvement in Carnival. He was the first President of the Republic who was not an attorney.

Richards was re-elected to a second five-year term as president by the Electoral College on 11 February 2008. He was the only candidate, and the Electoral College met for only three minutes.

In May 2009, Richards faced calls to resign for bungling the appointment of the Trinidad and Tobago Integrity Commission, whose members all resigned for various reasons within a week of being sworn in on 1 May 2009, even as Richards embarked on a three-week foreign vacation. In a televised address to the nation on 29 May 2009, he said he had not brought his office into disrepute and so saw no reason to resign. He remained in office until 2013.

== Other activities ==
Richards also served on the board of the Trinidad Publishing Company, TRINTOC, and the National Gas Company. He also served on the boards of several service organizations such as Chairman of both the National Training Board and National Advisory Council and the Institute of Marine Affairs.

== Personal life and death ==
He was married to Jean Ramjohn, an anesthesiologist and cousin of the former president Noor Hassanali. They had two children: a son, Mark, who is also a medical doctor; and a daughter, Maxine, who is a businesswoman.

Richards died at WestShore Medical Private Hospital in Port of Spain at around 7:43 pm, on 8 January 2018 of heart failure at the age of 86.

His ashes were scattered over the seas of the Gulf of Paria on the night of January 19, 2018 and the Richards family said their final farewell to their husband, father, brother, and uncle as well as the nation's fourth president.

== Honors ==
In 1977, Richards received the Chaconia Medal of the National Order of the Trinity, Class 1 Gold (the Chaconia Medal, Gold) for his contributions to Trinidad and Tobago.

Richards also received an Honorary Doctorate from Heriot-Watt University in 2007.

Political offices
Preceded by Arthur Robinson	President of Trinidad and Tobago; 2003–2013	Succeeded by Anthony Carmona
