= President of Trinidad and Tobago =

Head of state

President of the Republic of Trinidad and Tobago
- Presidential Emblem

- Presidential standard

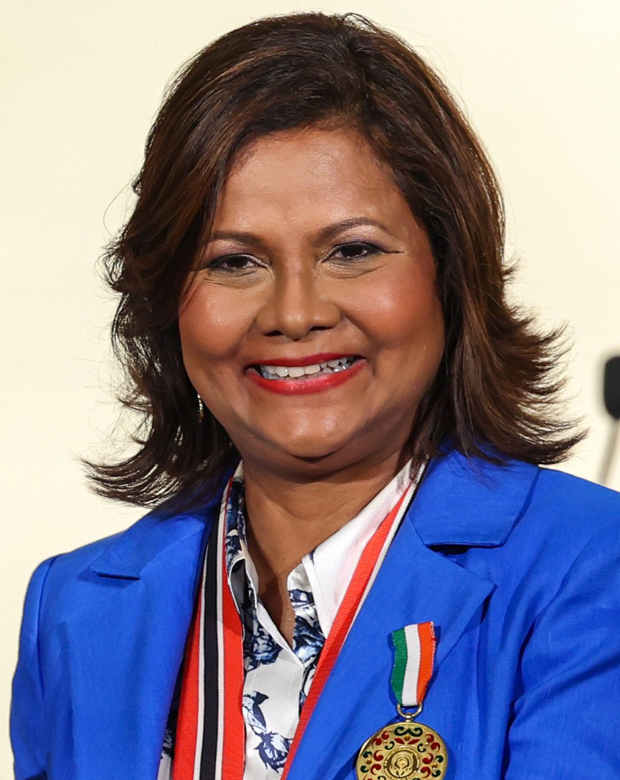
- Incumbent; Christine Kangaloo since 20 March 2023
- Style: His/Her Excellency
- Residence: President's House, Port of Spain, Trinidad and Tobago
- Appointer: Electoral college consisting of all of the members of the Senate and House of Representatives
- Term length: Five years; renewable indefinitely
- Constituting instrument: Constitution of Trinidad and Tobago
- Precursor: Queen of Trinidad and Tobago
- Inaugural holder: Sir Ellis Clarke
- Formation: September 24, 1976 (50 years ago)
- Deputy: President of the Senate
- Salary: TT$64,270 monthly (2022)
- Website: www.otp.tt

The president of the Republic of Trinidad and Tobago is the head of state of Trinidad and Tobago and the commander-in-chief of the Trinidad and Tobago Defence Force. The office was established when the country became a republic in 1976, before which the head of state was the Queen of Trinidad and Tobago, Elizabeth II. The last governor-general, Sir Ellis Clarke, was sworn in as the first president on 1 August 1976 under a transitional arrangement. He was formally chosen as president by an electoral college consisting of members of both houses of Parliament on 24 September 1976, which is now celebrated as Republic Day.

The president's post was one of many temporarily suspended during the Jamaat al Muslimeen coup attempt lasting from 27 July 1990 - 1 August 1990 when it resumed. The current president of Trinidad and Tobago is Christine Kangaloo.

== History ==
On 12 December 1969, at a sitting of the House of Representatives, the prime minister moved a motion on constitutional reform. He suggested that the House approve the appointment of a joint select committee of Parliament which would include representatives of all parties to consider whether it was desirable for Trinidad and Tobago to become a republic.

On 9 October 1970, the commission was appointed. They met once on 19 October 1970. However, in its report to Parliament, the committee stated that it wasn't able to complete consideration of the subject matter entrusted to it and recommended that in the following session a committee be appointed to complete action on this matter.

Governor-General Solomon Hochoy announced the Government's decision to appoint a constitutional commission, which was mandated to make recommendations for the revision of the constitution and also to produce a draft constitution based on its enquiry. Two years and six months later, in 1974, the complete report with recommendations, and the draft constitution were presented to the Governor-General on 22 January.

On 13 June 1975, Prime Minister Dr. Eric Williams laid the draft constitution of the republic in Parliament. Both houses of Parliament passed the Constitution of the Republic of Trinidad and Tobago Act on 26 March 1976. Just before the voting, most of the opposition leaders left the chamber in protest. There was also an attempt to stop the Governor-General's assent to the bill, through a motion filed by a private citizen in the San Fernando Supreme Court, but it failed. The bill was assented to on 29 March by the Governor-General.

The new constitution was adopted on 1 August 1976, when Trinidad and Tobago became a republic within the Commonwealth with a president as its head of state.

Upon proclamation of the republic, the monarchy and the post of governor-general were abolished. Ellis Clarke, the last governor-general, was sworn in as the country's first president.

== Electoral method ==
The President of Trinidad and Tobago is indirectly elected for a 5-year term by an electoral college comprising all 41 members of the House of Representatives and all 31 members of the Senate, plus the speakers of both chambers.

The president must be at least 18 years old (although no president has been younger than 40) a citizen of Trinidad and Tobago, and at the time of nomination must have been resident in the country for an unbroken period of ten years.

To win the election a candidate must gain a plurality of votes cast, whereby a quorum comprising the Speaker of the House of Representatives, 10 Senators and 12 other member of the House of Representatives must be met for the election to be considered valid. If only one candidate should be nominated to run in the election, he or she shall be considered to have been elected president without the need for a vote to take place.

The oath for the due execution of the office of president is:

"I, (name), do swear that I will bear true faith and allegiance to Trinidad and Tobago and to the best of my ability preserve and defend the Constitution and the law, that I will conscientiously and impartially discharge the functions of President and will devote myself to the service and well–being of the people of Trinidad and Tobago".

== Constitutional role ==
As President, my parliamentary role, though essential, is perhaps the least significant. My power and authority is, by law and convention, limited ultimately to acting on the advice of Cabinet once necessary legal requirements have been satisfied.

— President Paula-Mae Weekes, 2020

The 1976 Constitution gives the country a Westminster parliamentary system of government based on that of the United Kingdom, wherein the role of the head of state is both legal and practical. Similarly to other parliamentary republics in the Commonwealth of Nations such as India and Barbados, but unlike continental European parliamentary states such as Germany and Italy, the president of Trinidad and Tobago is formally vested with great constitutional power extending to all three branches of government. Like the British sovereign (and heads of state in other Westminster systems), the president "reigns but does not rule". In practice, executive authority is exercised by the prime minister and his or her cabinet, on behalf of the president as per the amended constitution, which states the president "shall act in accordance with the advice of the Cabinet or a Minister acting under the general authority of the Cabinet" except in certain circumstances, usually described as the reserve powers.

=== Executive powers ===
Under the amended constitution, the president is the nominal source of executive power. One of the main duties of the president is to appoint a prime minister, who thereafter heads the cabinet and advises the president on how to execute their executive powers over all aspects of government operations and foreign affairs. The president's role is almost entirely symbolic and cultural, acting as a symbol of the legal authority under which all governments and agencies operate, while the Cabinet directs the use of the president's executive power, which includes the privilege to declare war, as well as to summon and prorogue parliament and call elections.

However, the president's executive powers belongs to the president and not to any of the ministers, though it might have sometimes appeared that way, and the constitution allows the president to unilaterally use these powers in relation to the dismissal of a prime minister, dissolution of parliament, and removal of a judge in exceptional, constitutional crisis situations.

The president, to maintain the stability of the government of Trinidad and Tobago, appoints as prime minister the individual most likely to maintain the support of the House of Representatives. The president additionally appoints other ministers, on the advice of the prime minister. The president is remains fully briefed through regular communications from the cabinet.

=== Foreign affairs ===
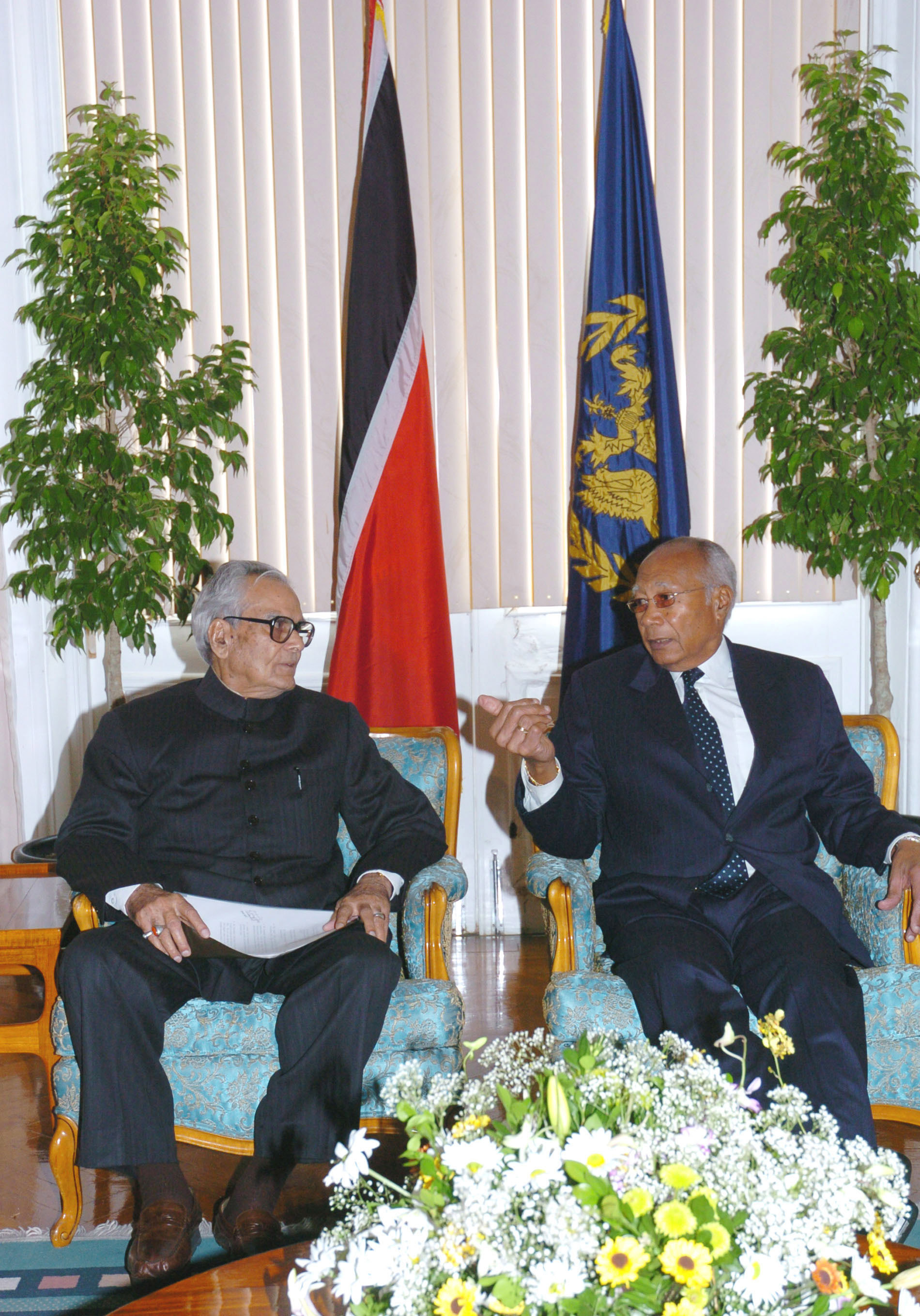
President George Maxwell Richards (right) meeting with the Vice President of India Bhairon Singh Shekhawat (left), 2006

The president's executive power also extends to foreign affairs: the president may negotiate and ratify treaties, alliances, and international agreements. However, in practice, such negotiations are usually carried out by the prime minister along with their Cabinet. The president also accredits Trinidad and Tobago High Commissioners and ambassadors, and receives diplomats from foreign states.

=== Parliament ===
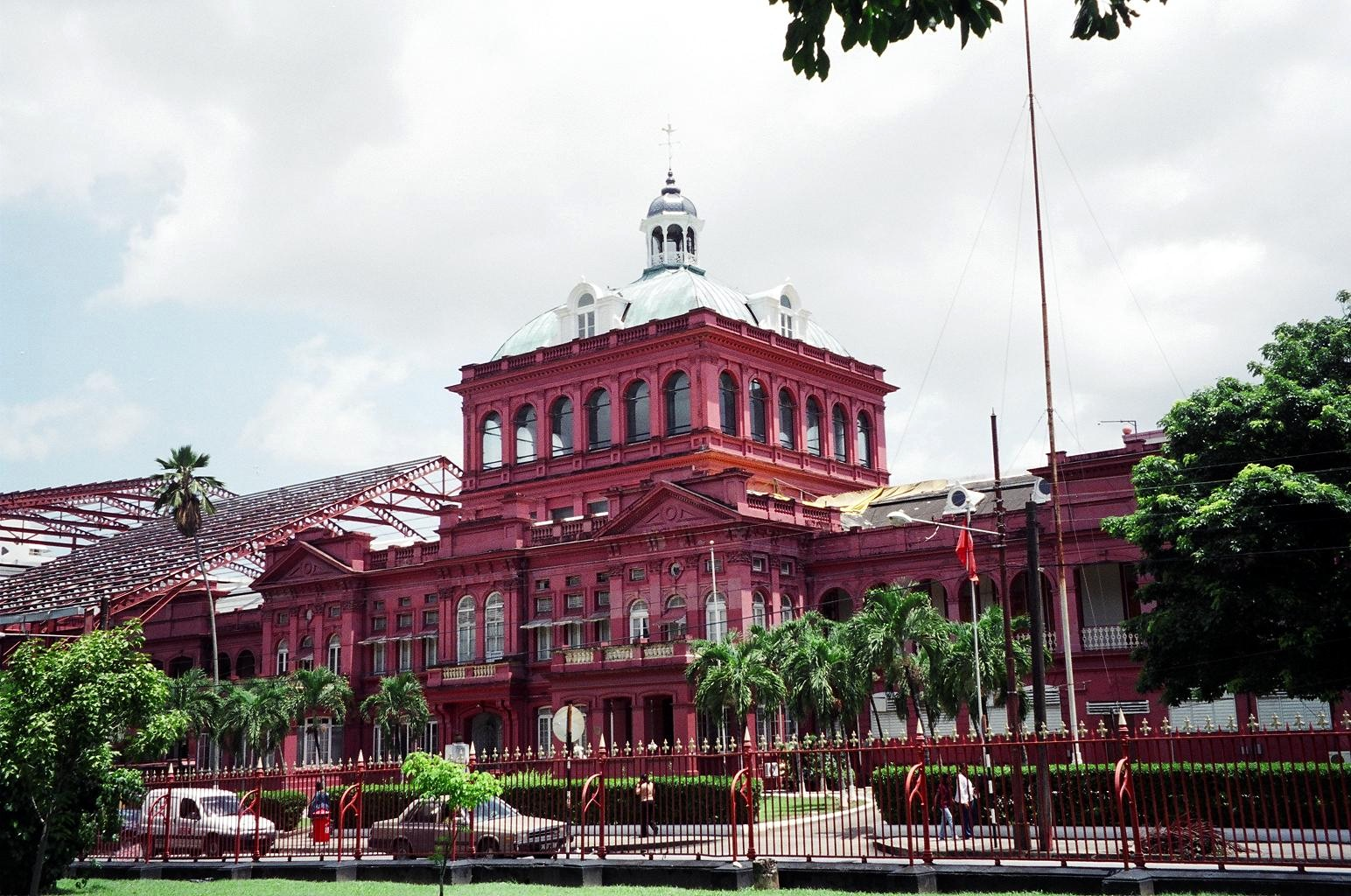
The Red House, the seat of Parliament.

The president, along with the Senate and the House of Representatives, is one of the three components of parliament. Since the president is almost always required to act on the advice of the cabinet, the president's role in the legislative process is limited to assenting to bills and signing them into law. However, the president has the absolute power to withhold assent to Bills passed by Parliament (i.e. to veto without parliamentary override).

Further, the Constitution outlines that the president is responsible for appointing senators — 16 Government Senators appointed on the advice of the Prime Minister, 6 Opposition Senators appointed on the advice of the Leader of the Opposition and 9 Independent Senators appointed on the discretion of the President from outstanding persons who represent other sectors of civil society.

The president additionally summons, prorogues, and dissolves parliament; after the latter, the writs for a general election are usually issued by the president at President's House. In practice, these powers are almost always exercised on the advice of the cabinet.

=== Judicial powers ===
The president has the right to appoint judges on the joint recommendation of the prime minister and leader of the opposition, and pardon offenders.

== Cultural role ==
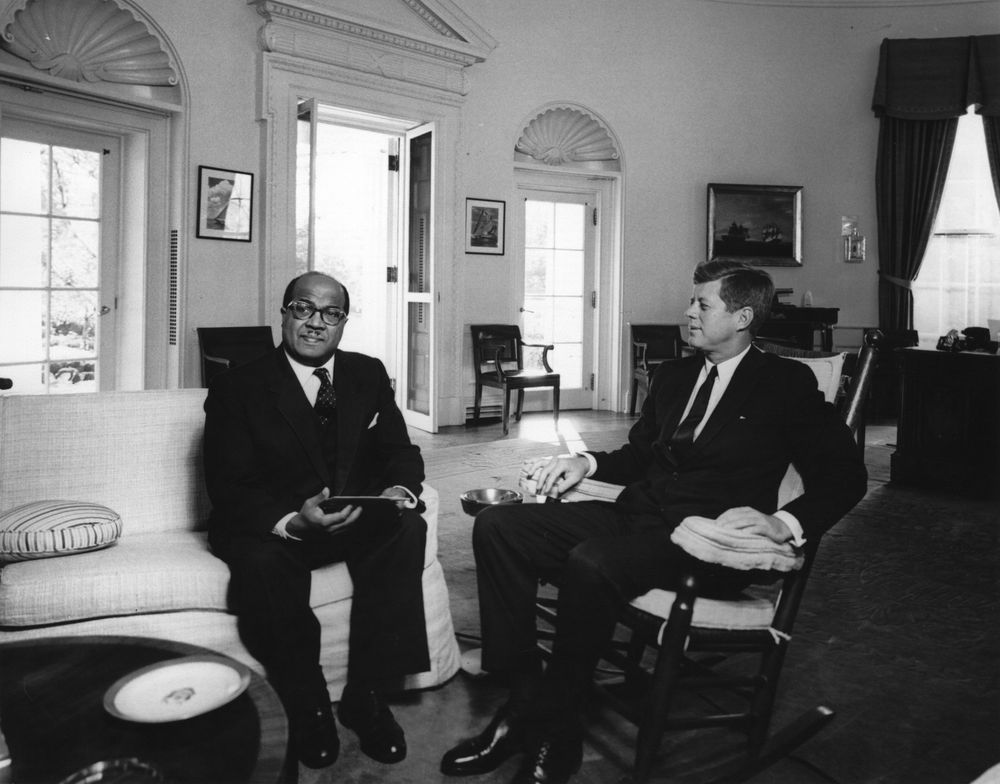
President Sir Ellis Clarke (left) meeting with U.S. President John F Kennedy (right) while serving as Ambassador to the United States, prior to becoming the first president.

In addition to the formal constitutional role and with most constitutional functions lent to Cabinet, the president has a representative and ceremonial role, though the extent and nature of that role has depended on the expectations of the time, the individual in office at the time, the wishes of the incumbent government, and the individual's reputation in the wider community. Presidents generally become patrons of various charitable institutions, present honours and awards, host functions for various groups of people including ambassadors to and from other countries, and travel widely throughout Trinidad and Tobago. Also as part of international relations, the president issues the credentials (called letter of credence) of Trinidad and Tobago ambassadors and consuls, when they visit foreign nations.

=== Presence and duties ===
Official duties involve the president representing the state at home or abroad and participating in a government-organised ceremony either in Trinidad and Tobago or elsewhere. The president and/or his or her spouse have participated in events such as important milestones, anniversaries, or celebrations of Trinidad and Tobago culture; Independence Day; the openings of public events like sport games; award ceremonies; Remembrance Day commemorations; and the like. The president provides non-partisan leadership in the community, acting as patron of many charitable, service, sporting and cultural organisations, and attending functions throughout the country.

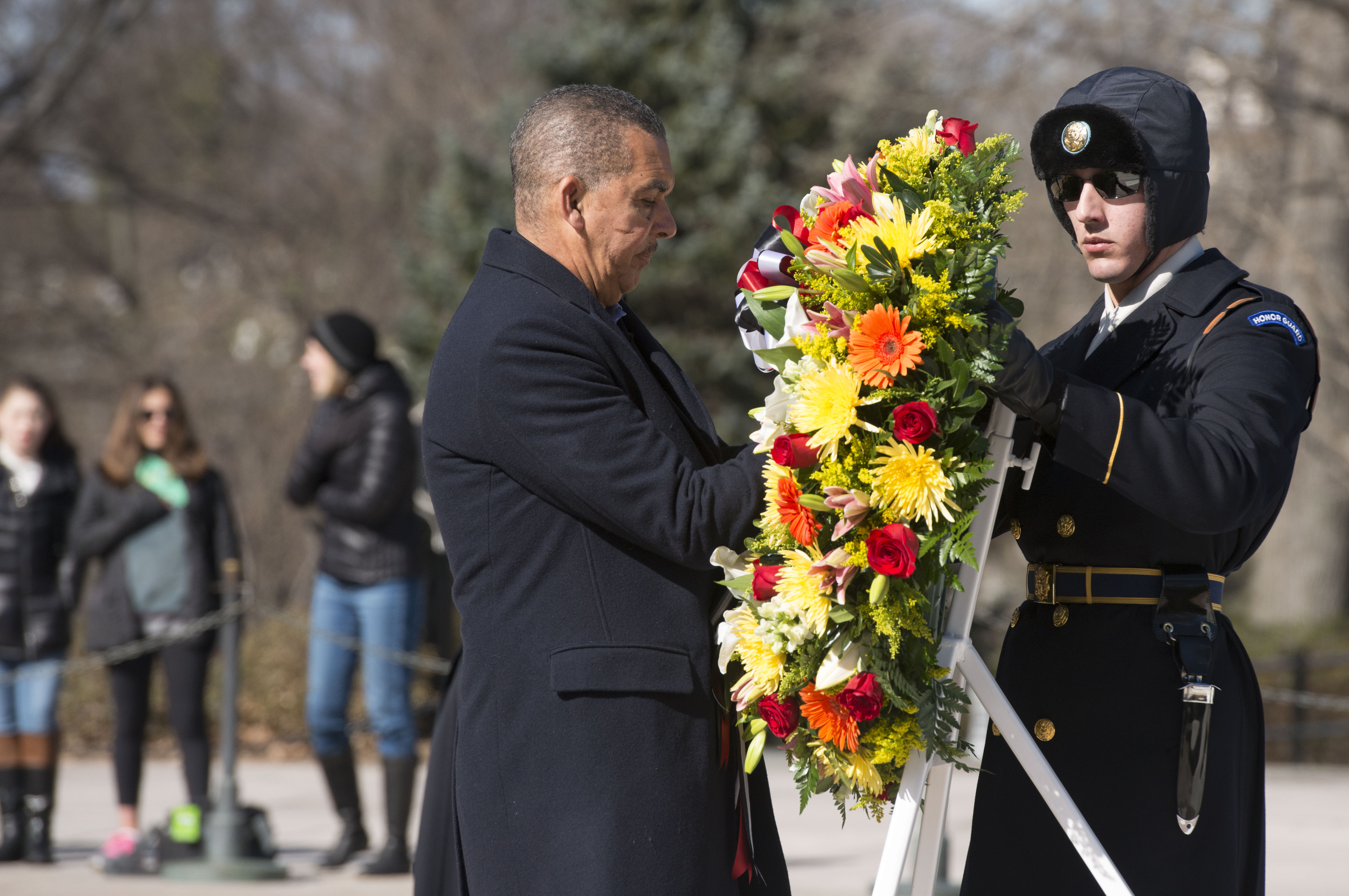
President Anthony Carmona lays a wreath at the Tomb of the Unknown Soldier in Arlington National Cemetery

The president also encourages, articulates and represents those things that unite Trinbagonians together. In this role, the president:

- frequently receives citizens on special occasions or celebrations, students of various schools, and visitors from other countries at President's House.
- attends church services, religious observances, and charitable, social, and civic events across the country.
- accepts patronage of many national, charitable, cultural, educational, sporting and professional organizations.
- issues congratulatory messages to organizations for special anniversaries and events, such as major national or international conferences, cultural festivals and sporting championships.

=== Military duties ===
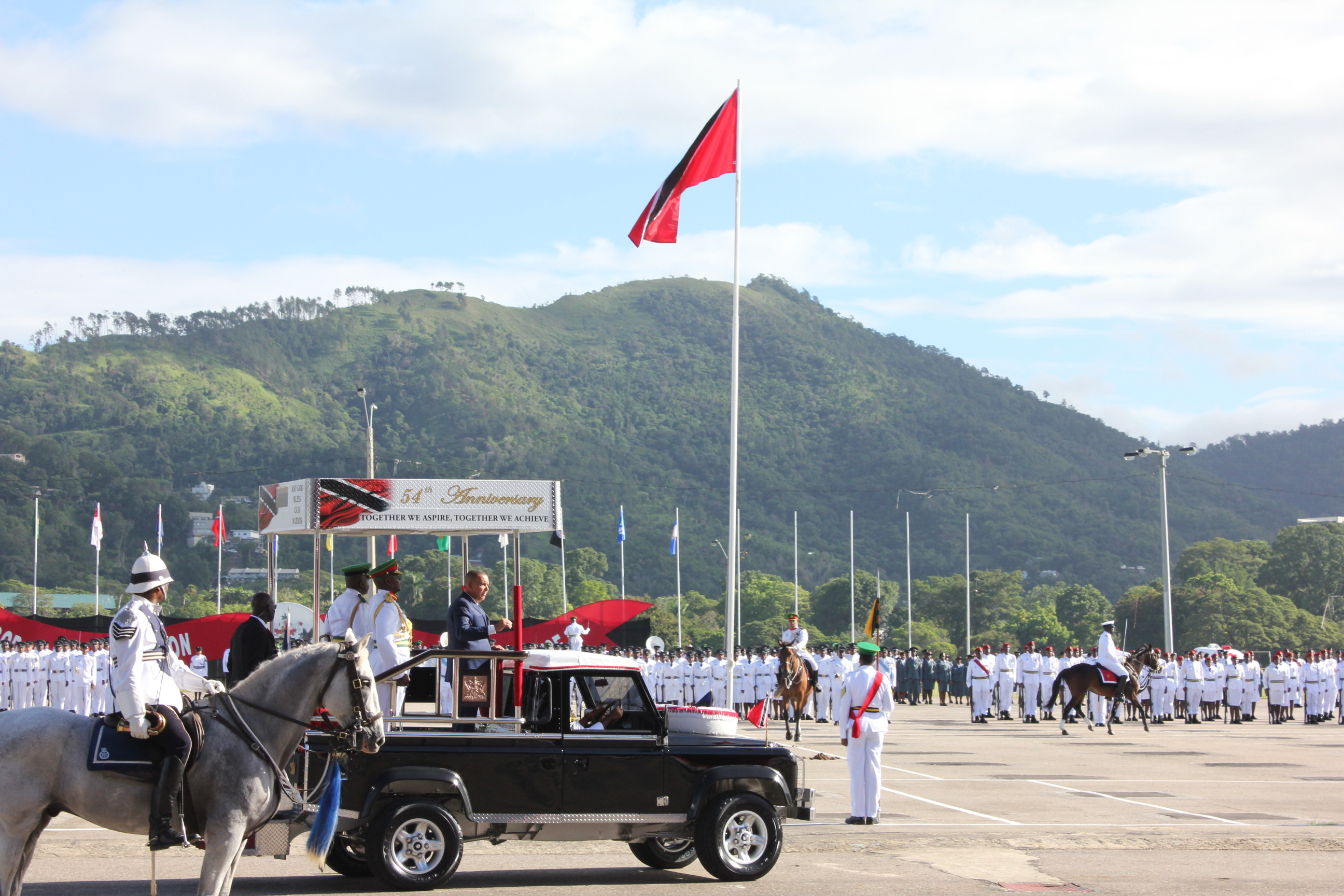
President Anthony Carmona inspects members of the Trinidad and Tobago Defence Force during the national Independence Day Parade, 2016

Under section 22 of the constitution, the president "...shall be the Head of State and Commander-in-Chief of the armed forces", consisting of the Trinidad and Tobago Regiment, the Trinidad and Tobago Coast Guard, the Trinidad and Tobago Air Guard and the Defence Force Reserves. The position technically involves issuing commands for Trinidad and Tobago troops, airmen, and sailors, though in practice the president does not play any part in the Trinidad and Tobago Defence Force command structure other than following the advice of the Minister for Defence in the normal form of executive government. In practice the commander-in-chief is a ceremonial role in which the president will take part in military ceremonies, including, independence parades, inspections of the troops, and state arrival ceremonies for foreign heads of state.

== Privileges ==
=== Salary ===
The president receives a monthly salary of $64,270TT, as of 2022.

=== Symbols ===
Official flag of the president of Trinidad and Tobago

The presidential flag may be flown from a vehicle in which the president is travelling, or from a building in which the president is present or is residing. The flag in its present form was adopted in 1976 and is a blue field with the Presidential Emblem in the centre. It takes precedence over the national flag. The national flag is generally employed when the president undertakes a state visit abroad or on a national celebration. The national flag is also flown at half-mast upon the death of an incumbent or former president.

=== Precedence and title ===
In the Trinidad and Tobago order of precedence, the president outranks all other individuals. The president and their spouse are styled "His/Her Excellency" during the term in office, the president and their spouse are entitled to the style "His/Her Excellency" for life upon assuming the office. On presentation to the president, the correct form of address is “Your Excellency”.

=== Residence ===
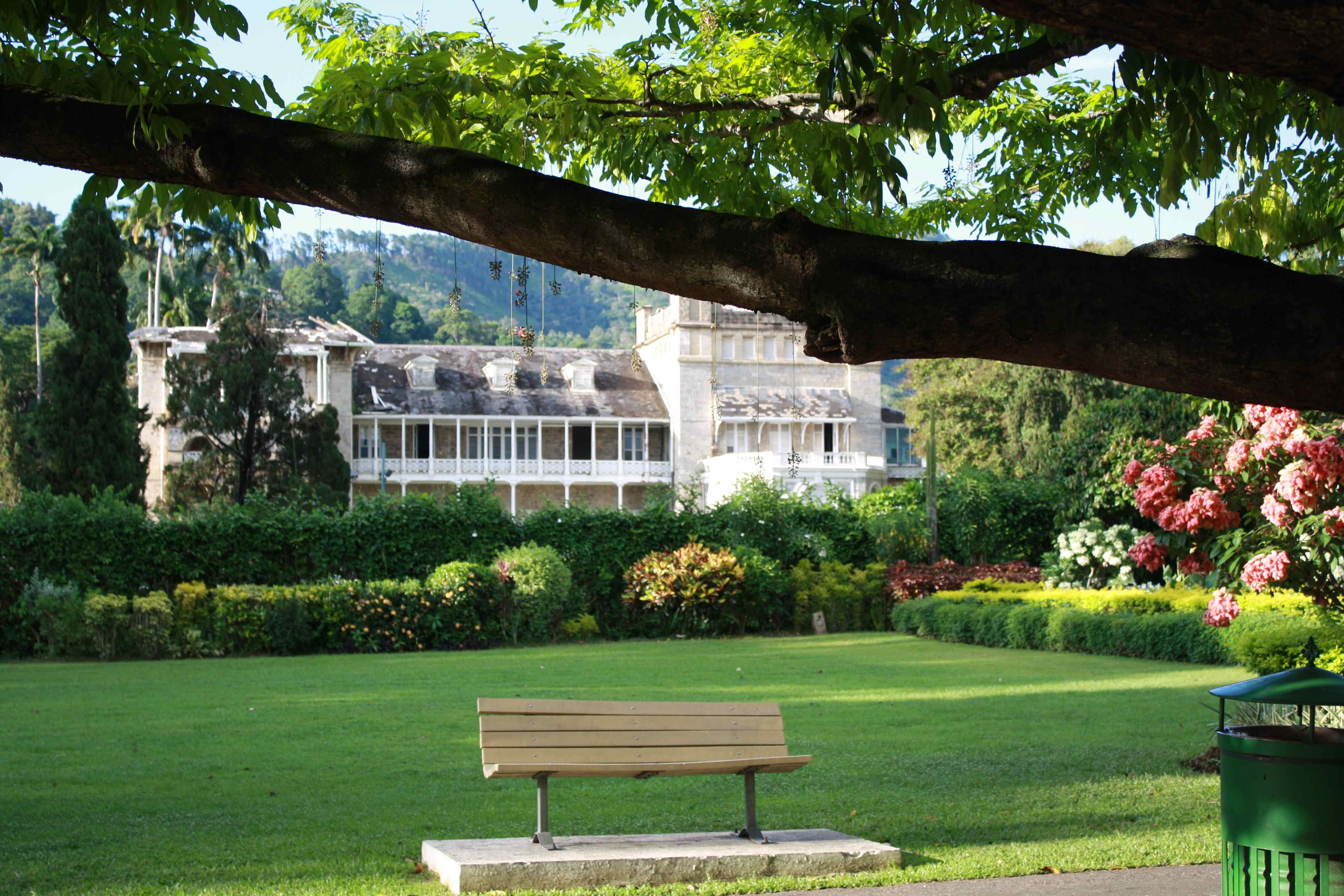
President's House - Official residence of the president of Trinidad and Tobago

The official residence of the president is President's House, previously known as Government House when it was used by the governors-general and governors of the islands. Today, as well as being the President's private residence, the mansion is used for national awards and swearing-in ceremonies, as well as diplomatic receptions.

== List of presidents ==
Under the 1976 Constitution of the Republic of Trinidad and Tobago, the president replaced the monarch as head of state. The president was elected by Parliament for a five-year term. In the event of a vacancy the President of the Senate served as acting president.

== See also ==
- First ladies and gentlemen of Trinidad and Tobago
- List of governors of Trinidad and Tobago
- List of heads of state of Trinidad and Tobago
- List of prime ministers of Trinidad and Tobago
