= Anthony Carmona =

President of Trinidad and Tobago from 2013 to 2018

His Excellency Anthony Carmona SC ORTT
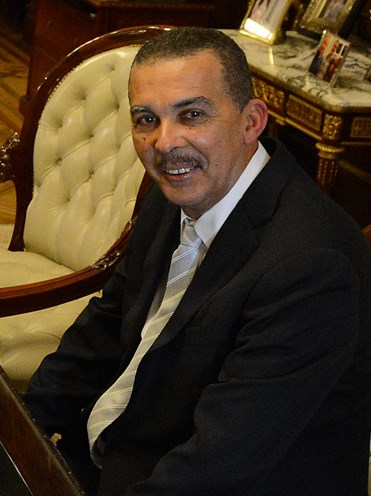

5th President of Trinidad and Tobago
- In office 18 March 2013 – 19 March 2018
- Prime Minister: Kamla Persad-Bissessar; Keith Rowley
- Preceded by: George Maxwell Richards
- Succeeded by: Paula-Mae Weekes

Judge of the International Criminal Court
- In office 11 March 2012 – 18 March 2013
- Nominated by: Trinidad and Tobago
- Appointed by: Assembly of States Parties
- Succeeded by: Geoffrey Henderson

Personal details
- Born: Anthony Thomas Aquinas Carmona; 7 March 1953 (age 73) Fyzabad, Siparia, Trinidad and Tobago
- Party: Independent
- Spouse: Reema Harrysingh (m. 1997)
- Children: 2
- Education: University of the West Indies; Hugh Wooding Law School

HE Anthony Thomas Aquinas Carmona SC ORTT (born 7 March 1953) is a Trinidadian politician who was the fifth President of Trinidad and Tobago from 2013 to 2018. Previously, he was a High Court Judge at the Supreme Court of Trinidad and Tobago, and served as a Judge of the International Criminal Court from 2012 to 2013.

== Early life and education ==
Anthony Carmona was born on 7 March 1953 in Fyzabad, in South Trinidad, eldest of six children of Dennis Stephen and Barbara Carmona. He is of Cocoa Panyol descent. He graduated from Santa Flora Government Primary School and Presentation College, San Fernando. He attended the University of the West Indies and the Hugh Wooding Law School between 1973 and 1983. He is married to Reema Harrysingh who is an economist 17 years his junior. They have two children.

== Career ==
After graduating from Hugh Wooding Law School in 1983, Carmona worked as a State Counsel. In 1989, he became a Senior State Attorney. From 1994 to 1999, he was first Assistant then Deputy Director of Public Prosecutions. From 2001 to 2004, he was an Appeals Counsel at the Office of the Prosecutor at the International Criminal Tribunal for the Former Yugoslavia in The Hague the International Criminal Tribunal for Rwanda in Arusha. Carmona received World Peace Culture Award on 4 May 2019.

=== High Court Judge ===
In 2004, he was appointed a High Court Judge at the Supreme Court of Trinidad and Tobago.

=== International Criminal Court ===
On 12 December 2011, he was elected as a judge of the International Criminal Court. He won the office in the first ballot in the Assembly of States Parties with 72 of 104 votes; 70 votes were needed. Carmona took office on 11 March 2012. He resigned the office on 18 March 2013, the day he assumed office as President of Trinidad and Tobago.

== President of Trinidad and Tobago ==
=== Nomination ===
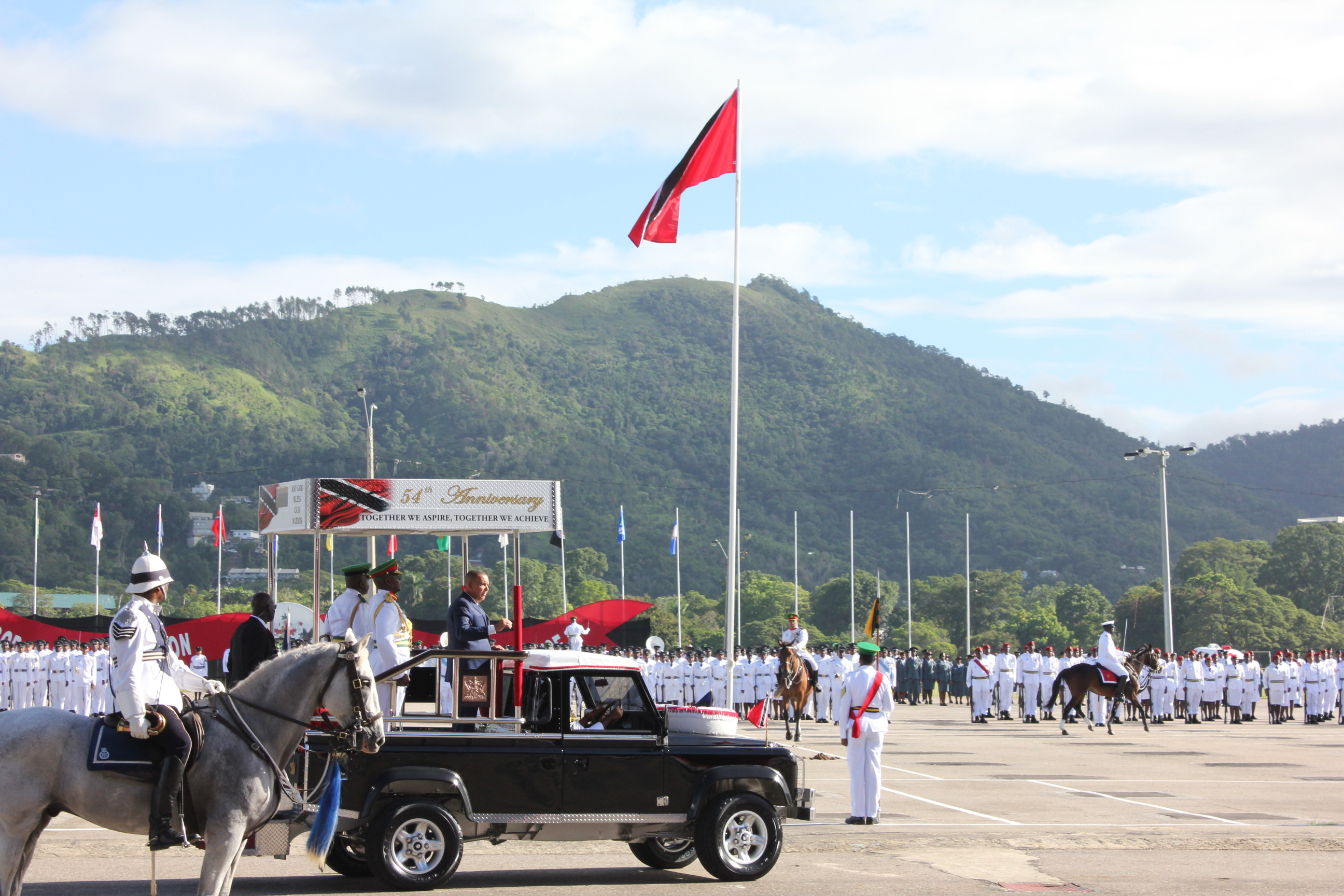
Carmona in a parade for Independence Day 2016

On 3 February 2013, Prime Minister Kamla Persad-Bissessar announced that the ruling party would nominate Carmona to succeed outgoing President George Maxwell Richards. The following day, Keith Rowley, leader of the opposition People's National Movement, indicated that his party supported Carmona's nomination. However, following this announcement, the People's National Movement questioned Carmona's eligibility to serve as President, given his work outside the country between 2001 and 2004. (To be eligible to be elected president, a person must be "ordinarily resident" in the country for the ten years prior to election.) Attorney General Anand Ramlogan responded by saying that the government had consulted with legal experts who expressed the opinion that Carmona met this requirement.

Political offices
Preceded by George Maxwell Richards	President of Trinidad and Tobago; 2013–2018	Succeeded by Paula-Mae Weekes
