= Chinese Caribbean people =

People of Han Chinese ethnic origin living in the Caribbean

Regions with significant populations
- Jamaica: 75,000
- Dominican Republic: 60,000
- Cuba: 41,000
- Suriname: 40,000
- French Guiana: 15,000
- Belize: 10,000
- Trinidad and Tobago: 3,984
- Puerto Rico: 3,000
- Guyana: 2,722
- Curaçao: 1,600
- Aruba: 1,100

Languages
- Colonial Languages: English (Guyanese; Jamaican; Trinidadian; Belizean); French; Spanish; Dutch; Portuguese; Varieties of Chinese: Mandarin; Hakka; Cantonese; Hokkien

Religion
- Roman Catholicism; Protestantism; Buddhism; Chinese folk religion (including Confucianism and Taoism)

Related ethnic groups
- Overseas Chinese; Han Chinese; Asian Caribbeans; Asian Latin Americans

Chinese Caribbean people (sometimes Sino-Caribbean people ) are people who are predominantly of Han Chinese ethnic origins living throughout the Caribbean. There are small but significant populations of Chinese and their descendants in all countries of the Greater Antilles. This diaspora migrants stretch back as far back as the mid-19th century. They are all part of the large global Chinese diaspora known as Overseas Chinese.

== Sub-groups ==
Caribbean Islands:

- Chinese Cubans
- Ethnic Chinese in the Dominican Republic
- Chinese Haitians
- Chinese Jamaicans
- Chinese immigration to Puerto Rico
- Chinese Trinidadian and Tobagonian

Mainland Caribbean:

- Ethnic Chinese in Belize
- Chinese Guyanese
- Chinese Surinamese

== Migration history ==
=== Indentured servitude ===
Between 1853 and 1879, 14,000 Chinese indentured servants were imported to the British Caribbean as part of a larger system of low-wage labor bound for the sugar plantations. Imported as a low-wage labor force from China, Chinese settled in three main locations: Jamaica, Trinidad, and British Guiana (now Guyana), initially working on the sugar plantations. Most of the Chinese workers initially went to British Guiana; however when importation ended in 1879, the population declined steadily, mostly due to emigration to Trinidad and Suriname.

Chinese immigration to Cuba started in 1847 when Cantonese low-wage workers were brought to work in the sugar fields, bringing their native Chinese folk religion with them. Hundreds of thousands of Chinese were brought in from Hong Kong, Macau, and Taiwan during the following decades to replace and / or work alongside African slaves. After obtaining their freedom, some descendants of Chinese indentured servants settled permanently in Cuba, although most longed for repatriation to their homeland. When the United States enacted the Chinese Exclusion Act on May 6, 1882, many Chinese in the United States fled to Puerto Rico, Cuba and other Latin American nations. They established small niches and worked in restaurants and laundries.

=== British West Indies ===
The Chinese indentured servants who entered the British West Indies in the middle and late nineteenth century formed a marginal but distinct part of the global dispersal of southern Chinese characteristics of the period. Next to those in the United States, on the one hand, and in Cuba and Peru, on the other, they formed the third largest regional grouping of Chinese arrivals to the Western Hemisphere in the mid-century. About 15,000 arrived in British Guiana, with just under 3,000 going to Trinidad and Jamaica, to work as indentured laborers in the sugar industry.

Although the patterns of their entry into these new societies represented a microcosmic version of the story of the Chinese diaspora in the nineteenth century, there were a number of note-worthy distinctive traits attached to this regional experience.

The bulk of Chinese coolies migration to the West Indies occurred between 1853 and 1866. By the end of the nineteenth century, some 18,000 Chinese would arrive in the West Indies, with the vast majority of those workers headed for Guyana. As was the case with most migration out of China in the nineteenth century, the workers were drawn from southern China and were seeking to escape desperate conditions caused by a combination of environmental catastrophes and political unrest.

There were also a considerable number of Christian converts among the Chinese migrants as a result of the colonial government's willingness to rely on Christian missionaries to assist them in their recruitment endeavors, particularly in the recruiting of family units. The use of Christian missionaries in recruitment was just one of many measures that the colonial government used in its venture to avoid accusations that indenture was simply another form of slavery. The government was particularly sensitive to such accusations because it was competing directly with other European powers, particularly Spain, to recruit low-wage laborers from China. The recruitment of the Chinese was generally conducted by professional recruiters, known as "crimps", who were paid per individual recruit, while the recruits themselves received a cash advance. In the 1850s, the demand for Chinese workers and the fees paid to the crimps increased so dramatically that the system quickly became notorious for its association with abuse and coercion, including kidnapping. The system was said to be known as "the sale of Little Pigs", alluding to the inhumane treatment migrants often faced.

The exposure of this inhumane system led to a series of ordinances being passed which, despite not directly enhancing the state of indentured Chinese, eventually played a key role in ending Chinese exploitation in the West Indies. In 1866, the Kung Convention signed in China, but never ratified by Britain, specifically provided back passage for the Chinese workers. West Indian planters were not, however, prepared to cover the additional cost that this would incur, especially in light of the fact that India was proving more than sufficient as a source of coolie. After the Chinese government refused to back down on the provision, interest in the Chinese Caribbean people as coolies seems to have simply faded.

== Representations ==
The manner in which the colonial powers introduced Chinese into the West Indies and the socioeconomic roles that they afforded to the migrants would directly affect how the Caribbean Chinese people were imagined and represented in colonial discourse in terms of where they belonged in the West Indies' social, economic and political landscapes.

The Caribbean Chinese people in literature, particularly, were regarded as either valuable additions to the multicultural mosaic of the Caribbean, or an entry into the problematic multiculturalism that existed in the region. George Lamming, for example, in his work Of Age and Innocence and Wilson Harris in The Whole Armour explored the Chinese character through the lens of the former. More often than not, the Caribbean Chinese people are presented as peripheral figures in stereotypical roles, as inscrutable or clever or linguistically deficient rural shopkeepers, preoccupied with money and profit. Such characters appear in the novels of Samuel Selvon, Michael Anthony, V.S. Naipaul, and even in the short stories of the Chinese Trinidadian Willi Chen.

The distance from other Caribbean people that is attributed to Ethnic Chinese in literary texts also manifests itself in the depiction of the Chinese as being a fundamentally alien presence in the West Indies. Indeed, Chinese characters are sometimes depicted as the only individuals who can see the larger themes. This can be seen in novels such as Pan Beat by Marion Patrick Jones, Mr. On Loong by Robert Standish, and The Pagoda by Patricia Powell.

In 2022 the Barbados Museum & Historical Society featured a project called "From Beijing to Bridgetown" to highlight the experiences of the island's Chinese diaspora resident in Barbados as far back as roughly the past 200 years.

== Notable people ==
Politics and government

- Arthur Chung: President of Guyana
- Solomon Hochoy: 17th Governor and first Governor General of Trinidad and Tobago.
- Lee Mark Chang, President of the Senate of Belize
- George Maxwell Richards, former President of Trinidad and Tobago
- Michael J. Williams, former President of the Senate of Trinidad and Tobago.
- Eugene Chen, former foreign minister of China
- Ronald J. Williams, former Senator, Member of Parliament and Minister of State Enterprises of Trinidad of Tobago, former Member of the Federal Parliament of the West Indies Federation.
- Gerald Yetming, former Senator, Member of Parliament, Minister of Finance
- Stuart Young, Prime Minister-designate of Trinidad and Tobago, Minister of multiple ministries, politician and lawyer

Business and industry

- Carlton K. Mack, grocer and philanthropist.
- William H. Scott, businessman.
- Louis Jay Williams, businessman.

Arts and entertainment

- Sybil Atteck, painter.
- Edwin Ayoung, calypsonian known by the sobriquet Crazy.
- Anya Ayoung-Chee, Miss Trinidad & Tobago/Universe 2008, model, fashion designer and winner of season 9 of Project Runway
- Raymond Choo Kong, actor, producer, director.
- Lenn Chong Sing, journalist and former editor of the Trinidad Guardian Newspaper
- Richard Fung, Trinidadian Canadian video artist
- Patrick Jones, calypsonian known by the sobriquet Cromwell, the Lord Protector and mas' pioneer.
- Wifredo Lam, painter
- Stephen and Elsie Lee Heung, Carnival bandleaders.
- Stephanie Lee Pack, Miss Trinidad and Tobago/Universe 1974
- Amy Leong Pang, artist
- André Tanker, musician and composer.
- Chris Wong Won, better known as Fresh Kid Ice; founding member of 2 Live Crew.
- Byron Lee, Jamaican Calypso artist and founder of Byron Lee & the Dragoneers
- Lola Young, artist of Jamaican-Chinese descent

Science and medicine

- Dr. Bert Achong, co-discoverer of the Epstein-Barr virus
- Fr. Arthur Lai Fook, educator and cleric
- Dr. Joseph Lennox Pawan, discoverer of the transmission of rabies by vampire bats
- Dr. David Picou
- Dr. Theodosius Poon-King
- Dr. Oswald Siung

Sports

- Ellis Achong, first Test cricketer of Chinese descent
- Richard Chinapoo, former national footballer
- David Chin Leung, karate pioneer, first Caribbean JKA judge
- Rupert Tang Choon, Trinidad cricketer, 1940s to 1950s
- Darwin LeonJohn, {Dharma Name Shi Heng Xin} Elite Martial Arts Teacher
- Bertram Manhin, winner of Trinidad and Tobago's first medal in shooting (1978 Commonwealth Games)
- Tahith Chong
- Jayde Riviere
- Cornel Chin-Sue
- Cerezo Fung a Wing
- Frank Woon-A-Tai

== See also ==
- African Chinese
- Asian Caribbeans
- Coolie
- Overseas Chinese
- Chinese emigration
- Caribbean Chinese cuisine
- Chinese Trinidadian and Tobagonian
- Chinese Exclusion Act
