= Chinese Trinidadians and Tobagonians =

Total population
- 3,984 (2011 census)

Languages
- English · Hakka Chinese · Cantonese · Mandarin

Religion
- Christianity, Chinese folk religion (including Chinese philosophy, Confucianism and Taoism), Buddhism

Related ethnic groups
- Han Chinese · Hakka people · Cantonese people · Chinese Caribbeans

Chinese Trinidadians and Tobagonians (sometimes Sino-Trinidadians and Tobagonians or Chinese Trinbagonians) are Trinidadians and Tobagonians of Han Chinese ancestry. The group includes people from mainland China, Hong Kong, and Overseas Chinese who have immigrated to Trinidad and Tobago and their descendants, including those who have emigrated to other countries. The term is usually applied both to people of mixed and unmixed Chinese ancestry, although the former usually appear as mixed race in census figures. Chinese settlement began in 1806. Between 1853 and 1866, 2,645 Chinese immigrants arrived in Trinidad as indentured labour for the sugar and cacao plantations. Immigration peaked in the first half of the twentieth century, but was dramatically lowered after the Chinese Communist Revolution in 1949. After peaking at 8,361 in 1960, the unmixed Chinese population in Trinidad declined to 3,800 in 2000; however, it slightly increased to 3,984 in 2011.

== Community ==
The Chinese Trinidadian and Tobagonian community is a diverse mixture that includes first-generation immigrants from China, Trinidadians whose ancestors have lived in Trinidad for many generations and diasporan Trinidadians and Tobagonians. Most Trinidadian Chinese originate from Guangdong Province, especially among the Hakka Han people and Cantonese Han people.

== History ==
The Chinese community in Trinidad and Tobago traces its origin to the 12 October 1806 arrival of the ship Fortitude carrying a group of Chinese men recruited in Macau, Penang and Calcutta. This was the first organised settlement of Chinese people in the Caribbean, preceding the importation of Chinese indentured labour by over 40 years. It was intended to be the first step in a plan to establish a settlement of free labourers and peasant farmers in what was then a newly acquired British colony. Royal Navy Captain William Layman suggested that it would be cheaper to establish new sugar plantations using free Chinese labour than it would with African slaves. At the same time, British officials concerned in the aftermath of the Haitian Revolution suggested that the settlement of Chinese immigrants in Trinidad would provide a buffer between the enslaved Africans and the whites.

In December 1805, a Portuguese captain recruited 141 Chinese men in Macau and shipped them to Penang where six more men were recruited. Another 53 men were recruited in Calcutta, bringing the total to 200. The survivors of this group arrived in Trinidad eight months later. Kim Johnson reports that 194 men survived the journey, while Walton Look Lai reports that there were 192 men. The group settled at Surveillance Estate in Cocorite, on the western edge of Port of Spain, the capital. Given the lack of farmland near the city, the group requested permission to hire themselves out as labourers. Fifteen were hired to work as seine fishers, and one worked as a shoemaker. After one year in Trinidad, 17 of the migrants had died. Sixty-one of them departed with the Fortitude in July 1807. By 1810 only 22 of them remained in Trinidad, and only seven remained in 1834, the last time that the community was mentioned.

The 1833 abolition of slavery in the British Empire led to labour shortages in Trinidad. Indentured labourers were imported from various parts of the world including India and Madeira. Between 1853 and 1866 2,645 Chinese immigrants arrived in Trinidad – 2,336 men, 309 women and 4 children – on eight ships. These immigrants constituted the second wave of Chinese immigration to Trinidad. The third wave began after the 1911 Revolution and continued until the Chinese Communist Revolution of 1949. Most of these immigrants were brought to Trinidad and Tobago through the efforts of earlier immigrants. The fourth wave of immigration began in the late 1970s and continues.

Additional immigrants settled in Trinidad after initially migrating to other parts of the Caribbean, especially British Guiana which received 13,593 indentured immigrants from China between 1853 and 1884.

== Prominent Chinese Trinidadians and Tobagonians ==
=== Politics and government ===
- Eugene Chen (born Eugene Acham), former foreign minister of China in the 1920s.
- Percy Chen, former Member of the Chinese People's Political Consultative Conference
- Solomon Hochoy, last British Governor and first Governor General of Trinidad and Tobago.
- David Lee, Member of Parliament and government minister
- George Maxwell Richards, former President of Trinidad and Tobago
- Michael J. Williams, former President of the Senate of Trinidad and Tobago.
- Ronald J. Williams, former Senator, Member of Parliament and Minister of State Enterprises, former Member of the Federal Parliament.
- Gerald Yetming, former Senator, Member of Parliament, Minister of Finance
- Stuart Richard Young, Member of Parliament and minister in various government ministries
- Brian Kuei Tung, former Senator, Minister of Finance and Minister of Trade, Industry and Tourism

=== Business and industry ===
- Carlton K. Mack, grocer and philanthropist.
- Louis Jay Williams, businessman.

=== Arts and entertainment ===
- Dai Ailian, dancer
- Sybil Atteck, painter
- Edwin Ayoung, calypsonian known by the sobriquet Crazy.
- Anya Ayoung-Chee, Miss Trinidad & Tobago/Universe 2008, model, fashion designer and winner of season 9 of Project Runway
- Jacqui Chan, actress, singer, and former partner of Lord Snowdon
- Raymond Choo Kong, actor, producer, director.
- Lenn Chong Sing, journalist and former editor of the Trinidad Guardian
- Richard Fung, artist and filmmaker
- Amy Leong Pang, artist
- André Tanker, musician and composer.
- Fresh Kid Ice, founding member of 2 Live Crew.
- Foxy Brown, rapper

=== Science and medicine ===
- Dr. Bert Achong, co-discoverer of the Epstein-Barr virus.
- Dr. Joseph Lennox Pawan, discoverer of the transmission of rabies by vampire bats.

=== Sports ===
- Ellis Achong, first Test cricketer of Chinese descent
- Rupert Tang Choon, Trinidad cricketer, 1940s to 1950s
- Matthew Woo Ling, soccer player of Chinese descent

=== Other ===
- Percy Chen, lawyer

== See also ==
- Chinese Caribbeans
- China–Trinidad and Tobago relations
