= Hugh Gordon Cummins =

Barbadian politician

Dr. Hugh Gordon Cummins
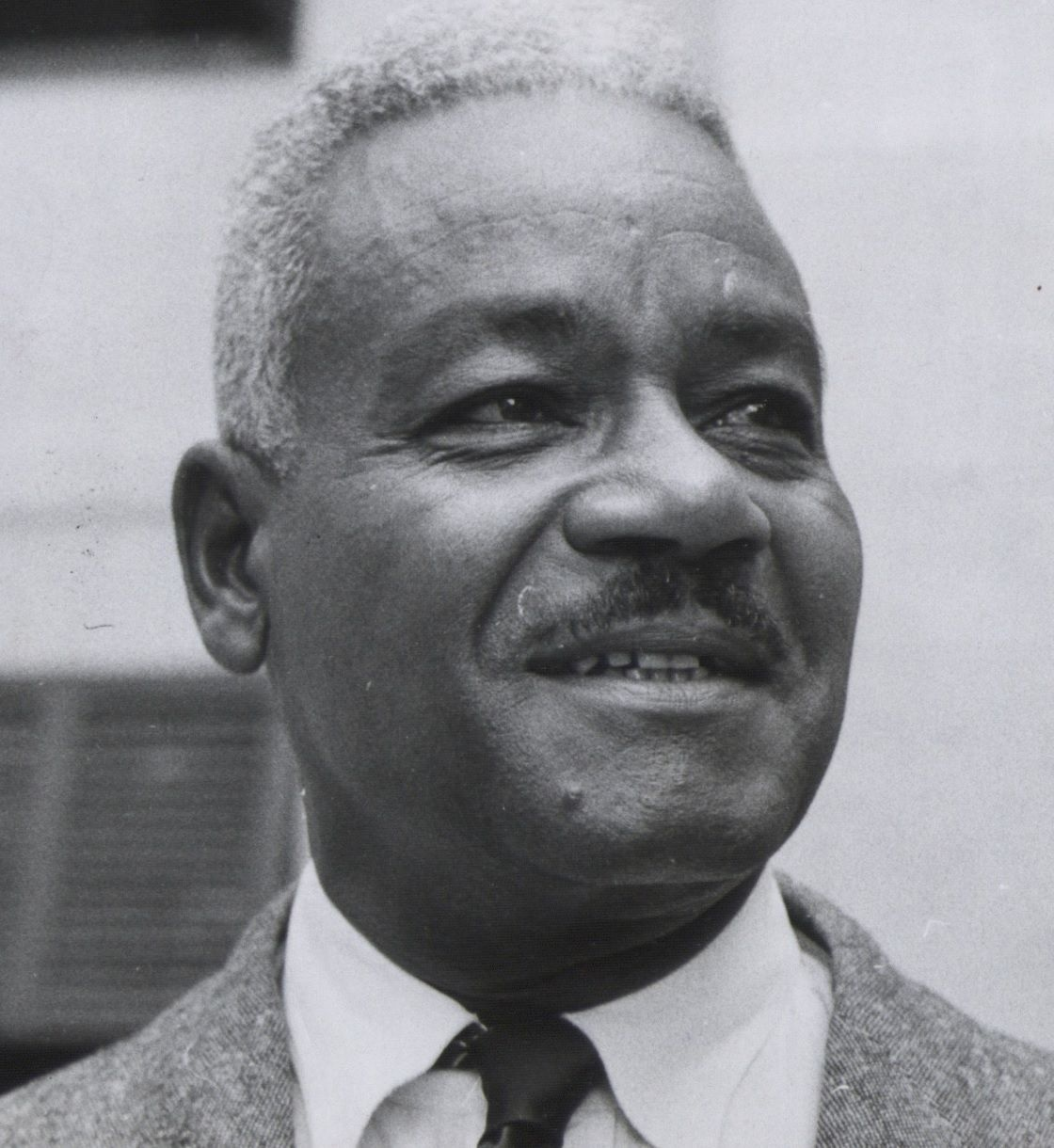

2nd Premier of Barbados
- In office 17 April 1958 – 8 December 1961
- Monarch: Elizabeth II
- Governor: Sir Robert Arundell; Sir John Montague Stow
- Preceded by: Grantley Herbert Adams
- Succeeded by: Errol Barrow

Personal details
- Born: 2 February 1891 British Windward Islands, (present day Barbados)
- Died: 26 October 1970 (aged 79) Barbados
- Party: Barbados Labour Party
- Education: Queen's University
- Occupation: Doctor

Dr. Hugh Gordon Hylvestra Cummins (2 February 1891 – 26 October 1970) was a Barbadian politician. He served as Premier of Barbados from 17 April 1958 to 8 December 1961 and was a member of the Barbados Labour Party (BLP).

In 1919, Dr. Cummins graduated from Queen's Faculty of Medicine where he became medical practitioner and later established a medical practice in the Bridgetown. In 1940, he became one of the first Barbados Labour Party members of Parliament. In 1951 he together with Grantley Herbert Adams, Mencea Cox (Sir Mencea) and Frank Walcott (Rt. Excellent Sir Frank) were appointed members of the Executive Committee of the BLP. He also became a Minister in 1954 when Ministerial Government was introduced. Cummins was the Speaker of the House of Assembly of Barbados from 1956 to 1958.

He became the second Premier of Barbados when Sir Grantley was elected Prime Minister of the West Indies Federation. During his premiership he held the additional portfolio of Minister of Finance.

His outstanding achievement was the abolition of the Located Labourers Act and he is commemorated by the naming of the ABC Highway and the Gordon Cummins Polyclinic in St. Thomas, the constituency that he represented.

== See also ==
- Politics of Barbados
- List of Premiers/Prime Ministers of Barbados

Parliament of Barbados
Preceded by	Member of Parliament for Saint Thomas; 1935 – 1965	Succeeded by
