= Florence Daysh =

Barbadian social worker and politician

- Daysh in 1958
- Born: Florence Evelyn Smith; 22 March 1908; Golden Grove Plantation, in Saint Philip Parish, Barbados
- Died: 1979 (aged 70–71); Saint Philip Parish, Barbados
- Occupations: social worker, women's rights activist, politician
- Years active: 1940–1979

Florence Daysh, OBE (1908–1979) was a Barbadian social worker and politician. In 1954, she was appointed to the Legislative Council of Barbados and then in 1958, she was elected to serve in the West Indies Federation, one of only two women. In addition to her social welfare activities, Daysh actively worked to improve women's rights and served as the president of the Caribbean Women's Association in the 1960s. She was appointed an Officer of the Order of the British Empire in 1957.

== Early life ==
Florence Evelyn Smith was born on 22 March 1908 at Golden Grove Plantation, St. Philip Parish, Barbados to the white plantation owner, Howard Smith and his Afro-Barbadian wife, Evelyn. Smith's family ostracized him for marrying a black woman in defiance of the social conventions of the times. Her father and a Mr. S. Browne purchased the plantation in 1905. Smith entered Codrington High School in 1917 and the following year, the family moved to the Thicketts Plantation, which Howard purchased that year. In addition to managing, Golden Grove and Thicketts, he was part of a syndicate which owned and managed the Three Houses Plantation, Fortescue Plantation, the factory at Three Houses and the Bathsheba Railway. The St. Philip District Hospital has a wing named in honour of her mother and the family was known for their philanthropy.

Known for her flamboyant social life and outspokenness, Smith was known widely as "Brown Sugar" or "The Little Black Savage" during her youth. As her parents had defied social custom, Smith was open about her mixed heritage as well. Graduating from Codrington in 1920, she and then went to Cheltenham, England to further her studies and completed finishing school in France.

== Career ==
Returning to Barbados, after completion of her schooling, Smith became involved in social work, with the Black Rock Baby Welfare League. She served as president of the Baby Welfare League, which provided milk and medical care to infants, for fifteen years. In 1944, she joined the British Red Cross and went back to England for the duration of the war. In 1947, she returned to Barbados, where she met and married Norman Goodlet Daysh, a New Zealand seaman. The following year, with Marcella Peebles, Daysh founded the St. Philip Bay League and was the primary benefactor of the Joan Arundell Day Nursery, having built and equipped the facility.

In 1950, Daysh began her political life, with her election to the St. Philip Vestry. In 1954, she was appointed to the Legislative Council, only the second woman who had ever served, after Muriel Hanschell, who had been appointed in 1949. She was appointed an Officer of the Order of the British Empire in 1957 for her social welfare participation. When the West Indies Federation was formed in 1958, she ran for office and was elected as one of the only two women in the federal House of Representatives. She was a supporter of Caribbean self-determination and as one of the few candidates in the election who were not aligned with the West Indies Federal Labour Party or Democratic Labour Party, her support of Grantley Adams for Prime Minister played a pivotal role in his selection as first head of the federal government.

Daysh pushed for the creation of the Barbados Branch of the British Red Cross Society and in 1960, was appointed its first director. She also served as first president of the Barbados Council of Women and in 1960, was elected as president of the Caribbean Women's Association. One of the issues that she strongly supported was a birth control initiative.

== Death and legacy ==
Daysh died in 1979. She is remembered most for her philanthropy, which included a scholarship fund bearing her name given out by the University of the West Indies. The plantation in which she was born is now open to the public and rented as a venue for events.
