= Ronald Jay Williams =

Trinidadian politician

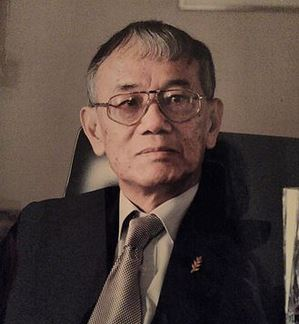

Minister of State Enterprises
- In office 27 November 1981 – 29 November 1986
- Prime Minister: George Chambers

Member of Parliament for Port of Spain South
- In office 27 November 1981 – 29 November 1986
- Prime Minister: George Chambers

Senator
- In office 29 December 1961 – 22 April 1971
- Prime Minister: Dr. Eric Williams
- Premier: Dr. Eric Williams

Member of Federal Parliament for Port of Spain West
- In office 1958–1961
- Prime Minister: Sir Grantley Herbert Adams
- Leader: Dr. Eric Williams
- Preceded by: Position established
- Succeeded by: Position abolished

Personal details
- Born: Ronald Jay Williams; 28 January 1928 Trinidad and Tobago
- Died: 16 May 2000 (aged 72) Trinidad and Tobago
- Party: People's National Movement
- Education: University of Toronto

Ronald Jay Williams (January 28, 1928 – May 16, 2000) was a Trinidadian businessman and politician. He was a Member of Parliament for the West Indies Federation, Senator of Trinidad and Tobago, and Member of Parliament of Trinidad and Tobago. From 1981 to 1986, he served as Minister of State Enterprises. During his tenure in government, his drive to reduce waste and seek cost efficiencies earned him the nickname "Chinese Chopper", a reference to his ethnicity and his willingness to cut expenditures.

After graduating from the University of Toronto, Williams returned to his native Trinidad and Tobago, where he is known for his contributions to the country's economic and cultural development as both a public figure and a private citizen. He served in a number of different roles on various boards and committees, including as Chairman of the Carnival Development Committee. He is credited with naming Trinidad and Tobago's annual steelband festival, "Panorama". In recognition of his contributions to the nation's cultural development, he was awarded the Hummingbird Medal Gold in 1971 by the Government of Trinidad and Tobago.

== Early life ==
Ronald Jay Williams was born in 1928 in Trinidad and Tobago, then a colony of the British Empire. His mother was Ellen Lai Fook, the sister of Father Arthur Lai Fook, and his father was Trinidadian businessman Louis Jay Williams (1897 – 1968). His brother Michael Jay Williams is also a politician.

Williams's parents were descended from Chinese labourers who came to the Caribbean in the early to mid 1800s. His father was born in Trinidad and would become well known for his business acumen. Louis Jay Williams played a pivotal leadership role in the nation's business development in the 20th century; his many accomplishments included being the first Trinidadian businessman to use local broadcasting stations for advertising purposes and pioneering Trinidad and Tobago's international trade relations, notably establishing the Australia to West Indies Shipping Service. In 1925, Louis Jay Williams founded L.J Williams Ltd., the company Ronald Jay Williams would eventually lead as Managing Director.

Williams spent his early life being educated in his native country, attending Western Boys' Roman Catholic School, Belmont Boys' Intermediate School, and St. Mary's College. He then pursued his undergraduate studies in Canada at the University of Toronto, where he would meet his wife, Winifred Lownie.

== Career ==
After completing his studies in Canada, Williams returned to Trinidad where he began his career working for his father at L.J Williams Ltd. From 1952 to 1966, he was the Manager of American Life Insurance Company and a director at L.J Williams Ltd. In 1966, he assumed full control of the family company and became managing director of L.J Williams Ltd. During this time, Williams also became deeply involved in politics at a crucial point in Trinidad and Tobago's transition from colony to independent nation.

In 1958, several islands of the English-speaking Caribbean attempted to seek autonomous governance through the creation of the West Indies Federation. Based on the Canadian Confederation model, each nation formed its own provincial government while also electing representatives to a unified federal parliament. When the newly formed West Indies Federation held its first election in 1958, Williams represented the People's National Movement (PNM) party and was elected to the Federal Parliament of the West Indies Federation as Member of Parliament for Port of Spain West. Although the local PNM party did not win the majority of federal constituencies in Trinidad and Tobago, it helped form the federal government as part of the larger West Indies Federal Labour Party led by Sir Grantley Herbert Adams. Meanwhile, the PNM also controlled the local Legislative Council with Williams's party leader, Eric Williams (no relation), serving as Premier.
