= 1958 West Indies federal elections =

- 25 March 1958

All 45 seats in the House of Representatives 23 seats needed for a majority
	First party	Second party	Third party
		DLP	BNP
Leader	Grantley Herbert Adams	Ashford Sinanan	Florence Daysh
Party	Federalist	Democrat	Barbados National
Seats won	25	19	1
- Colours denote the party with the largest number of seats by island/island group. Grey denotes islands not part of the Federation.
Position unfilled before election
None
Prime Minister
Grantley Herbert Adams
Federalist

Federal elections were held in the West Indies Federation for the first and only time on 25 March 1958. The result was a victory for the West Indies Federal Labour Party, which won 25 of the 45 seats in the House of Representatives.

== Electoral system ==
Candidates were nominated on 28 February in all unit territories except Trinidad and Tobago, where candidates were nominated on 3 March.

The elections were held in a mix of single- and multi-member constituencies. In all territories except Jamaica and Trinidad and Tobago, the constituency covered the entire territory; Antigua and Barbuda elected two, Barbados five, Dominica two, Grenada two, Montserrat one, St Kitts-Nevis-Anguilla two, St Lucia two and St Vincent and the Grenadines two.

Jamaica had 17 constituencies based on the 14 parishes and three counties (which overlapped the parishes), meaning voters elected representatives from two levels. In Trinidad and Tobago, the ten seats were based on the counties, some of which were single-member (Tobago and Caroni) and some of which were multi-member (Saint George). In some cases counties were merged to form a single-member constituency (such as the Eastern Counties).

== Campaign ==
In preparation for the elections, two Federation-wide parties were organised as confederations of local political parties. Both were organised by Jamaican politicians: the West Indies Federal Labour Party by Norman Manley, and the Democratic Labour Party, by Alexander Bustamante. In broad terms, the WIFLP consisted of the urban-based parties throughout the Federation, while the DLP consisted of the rural-based parties. A small third party, the Federal Democratic Party, was founded in November 1957 by a group of Trinidadians.

The platforms for the two major parties were similar in many respects. Both advocated maintaining and strengthening ties with the United Kingdom, United States, and Canada (countries with which the islands had strong cultural and economic links); encouraging and expanding tourism; working to bring British Guiana and British Honduras into the Federation and to obtain loans, financial aid, and technical assistance. Despite these similarities, there were differences. The WIFLP had advocated the encouragement of agriculture while the DLP had promised a climate favourable to both private industry and labour, development of human and economic resources. The WIFLP promised to encourage the Bahamas (in addition to British Guiana and British Honduras) to join the Federation, whereas the DLP did not. The WIFLP also campaigned to establish a central bank for the extension of credit resources and advocated a democratic socialist society and full internal self-government for all the unit territories, whilst avoiding the issues of freedom of movement and a customs union. The DLP said nothing about full internal self-government, attacked socialism, wished to avoid high taxation (via loans and technical aid) and emphasized West Indian unity, freedom of worship and speech and encouragement of trade unions.

== Results ==
The WIFLP won the election with 25 seats and was supported by the Barbados National Party, which won 1 seat; the DLP won 19 seats. The bulk of the WIFLP seats came from the smaller islands, and the DLP won in Jamaica and Trinidad and Tobago.

WIFLP leader Grantley Adams of Barbados became Prime Minister.

Party	Seats
West Indies Federal Labour Party	25
West Indies Democratic Labour Party	19
Barbados National Party	1
Total	45

=== By province ===
Province	Party			MPs
Province	WIFLP	DLP	BNP	MPs
Antigua and Barbuda	2 (ALP)			2
Barbados	4 (BLP)		1 (BNP)	5
Dominica	2 (DLP)			2
Grenada	2 (GULP)			2
Jamaica: Cayman Islands; Turks and Caicos Islands	6 (PNP)	11 (JLP)		17
Montserrat	1 (MTLU)			1
Saint Christopher-Nevis-Anguilla	2 (WL)			2
Saint Lucia	2 (SLP)			2
Saint Vincent and the Grenadines		2 (PPP)		2
Trinidad and Tobago	4 (PNM)	6 (DLP)		10
Total				MPs
Total	WIFLP	DLP	BNP	MPs
Total	25 (55.5%)	19 (42.2%)	1 (2.2%)	45

=== By constituency ===
Province	Constituency	Winner	(Party)
Antigua	1st seat	Novelle Richards	WIFLP
Antigua	2nd seat	Bradley Carrott	WIFLP
Barbados	1st seat	Grantly Adams	WIFLP
Barbados	2nd seat	Harcourt Rocheford	WIFLP
Barbados	3rd seat	V. B. Vaughn	WIFLP
Barbados	4th seat	Deighton Lisle Ward	WIFLP
Barbados	5th seat	Florence Daysh	BNP
Trinidad & Tobago	Caroni	Surujpat Mathura	DLP
Jamaica	Clarendon Parish, Jamaica	Frederick Duhaney	DLP
Jamaica	Cornwall County, Jamaica	Ernest Wakeland	DLP
Jamaica	Middlesex County, Jamaica	Stanley Augustus Lennon	DLP
Jamaica	Surrey County, Jamaica	Kenneth Hill	DLP
Dominica	1st seat	Edward Oliver LeBlanc	WIFLP
Dominica	2nd seat	Phyllis Shand Allfrey	WIFLP
Trinidad & Tobago	Eastern Counties	Victor Bryan	DLP
Grenada	1st seat	Thomas Gibbs	WIFLP
Grenada	2nd seat	Lincoln Radix	WIFLP
Jamaica	Hanover Parish	Sydney Stone	DLP
Jamaica	Kingston Parish	Ralph Brown	WIFLP
Jamaica	Manchester Parish	Louis Patrick Delapenha	WIFLP
Montserrat		William Henry Bramble	WIFLP
Trinidad & Tobago	Port of Spain, East	Donald Pierre	WIFLP
Trinidad & Tobago	Port of Spain, West	Ronald Jay Williams	WIFLP
Jamaica	Portland Parish	Clement Afflick	DLP
Jamaica	Saint Andrew Parish, Jamaica	M. A. Hector	DLP
Jamaica	Saint Ann Parish	F. B. Ricketts	WIFLP
Trinidad & Tobago	Saint Anns	W. Andrew Rose	WIFLP
Jamaica	Saint Catherine Parish	Winston Williams	DLP
Jamaica	Saint Elizabeth Parish	Lionel Densham	DLP
Trinidad & Tobago	Saint George, East	Albert Gomes	DLP
Jamaica	Saint James Parish, Jamaica	Howard Cooke	WIFLP
Saint Kitts	1st seat	Robert Llewellyn Bradshaw	WIFLP
Saint Kitts	2nd seat	David S. Lloyd	WIFLP
Saint Lucia	1st seat	Carl La Corbiniere	WIFLP
Saint Lucia	2nd seat	Joseph Bosquet	WIFLP
Jamaica	Saint Mary Parish, Jamaica	Morris Cargill	DLP
Trinidad & Tobago	Saint Patrick	Mohammed Shah	DLP
Jamaica	Saint Thomas Parish, Jamaica	Robert Lightbourne	DLP
Saint Vincent	1st seat	Leroy Adams	DLP
Saint Vincent	2nd seat	Alphaeus Allen	DLP
Trinidad & Tobago	San Fernando-Naparima	Roy Joseph	DLP
Trinidad & Tobago	Tobago	A. N. R. Robinson	WIFLP
Jamaica	Trelawny Parish	A. U. Belinfanti	WIFLP
Trinidad & Tobago	Victoria	Ashford Sinanan	DLP
Jamaica	Westmoreland Parish	Constantine Swaby	DLP

== Aftermath ==
=== Government formation ===
Following the elections, Grantley Herbert Adams of the WIFLP became Prime Minister following a 23–21 vote in the House (the Grenada members, while allied with WIFLP, supported the DLP). However, his selection was indicative of the problems the Federation would face; The expected leader of the WIFLP was Norman Manley, Premier of Jamaica, and the next logical choice was Eric Williams, Premier of Trinidad and Tobago. However, neither had contested the federal elections, preferring to remain in control of their respective island power bases, and were not eligible. This suggested that the leaders of the two most important provinces did not see the federation as viable. Similarly, Alexander Bustamante, the Jamaican founder of the DLP, also declined to contest the federal election, leaving the party leadership to the Trinidadian Ashford Sinanan. The absence of the leading Jamaican politicians from any role at the federal level was to undermine the federation's unity.

The Council of State included:

- Prime Minister: Grantly Adams (Barbados)
- Deputy Prime Minister and Minister of Trade and Industry: Carl La Corbiniere (St. Lucia)
- Minister of Labour and Social Affairs: Phyllis Shand Allfrey (Dominica)
- Minister of Finance: Robert Llewellyn Bradshaw (St. Kitts)
- Minister of Natural Resources and Agriculture: F.B. Ricketts (Jamaica)
- Minister of Communications and Works: W. Andrew Rose, (Trinidad)
- Minister without Portfolio: Novelle Richards Richards, (Antigua)
- Minister without Portfolio: V. B. Vaughn (Barbados)
- Leader of the Opposition: Ashford Sinanan (Trinidad)
- Marshall of the House: John R. Ashmeade

=== Senate selection ===
The Composition of the West Indies Senate after the 1958 federal elections.

The Senate was appointed in April 1958, shortly before the opening of Parliament. In a controversial move, Governor-General Lord Hailes consulted the opposition DLP groups in Trinidad and Jamaica and appointed one DLP nominee senator from each of those territories, resulting in 15 WIFLP senators and 4 DLP senators overall. Lord Hailes did this having taken account of the fact that St. Vincent was the only unit territory with a DLP government and that as a result the federal senate was going to be overwhelmingly pro WIFLP.

Islands	DLP	WIFLP	Total	Senators
Antigua and Barbuda	0	2	2	Henry Moore (WIFLP), Bertha Higgins (WIFLP)
Barbados	0	2	2	Hampden Cuke (WIFLP), Arnott Cato (WIFLP)
Dominica	0	2	2	John Charles (WIFLP), George Winston (WIFLP)
Grenada	0	2	2	Theophilus Albert Marryshow (WIFLP), John Renwick (WIFLP)
Jamaica (incl. Cayman Islands and Turks and Caicos Islands)	1	1	2	Allan G. R. Byfield (WIFLP), Douglas Judah (DLP)
Montserrat	0	1	1	James Meade (WIFLP)
Saint Kitts-Nevis-Anguilla	0	2	2	James Liburd (WIFLP), William Seaton(WIFLP)
Saint Lucia	0	2	2	Allen Lewis (WIFLP), James Luc Charles (WIFLP)
Saint Vincent and the Grenadines	2	0	2	Edward Hughes (DLP), Norbert Davis (DLP)
Trinidad and Tobago	1	1	2	Marguerite Wyke (WIFLP), Deonarayan Maharajh (DLP)
Total	4	15	19	

From the Senate, the Council of State included:

- Minister without Portfolio: A.G.R. Byfield (Jamaica)
- Minister without Portfolio: J.W. Liburd (St. Kitts-Nevis-Anguilla)
- Minister without Portfolio: J.L. Charles (St. Lucia)
