= Bertha Higgins =

Member of the Federation Senate
- In office 1958–1962
- Constituency: Antigua and Barbuda

Personal details
- Born: 29 October 1889
- Died: 17 July 1966 (aged 76)

Bertha Alexandrina Higgins MBE (29 October 1889 – 17 July 1966) was an Antiguan artist, musician, teacher and politician. She was appointed to the Senate of the West Indies Federation in 1958, becoming the first female parliamentarian from Antigua and Barbuda.

== Biography ==
Higgins was born in October 1889, one of three daughters of Julia Florence Henry and Roland Edward Henry. She attended Coke Memorial College and the Durhadden School, where she studied art. She subsequently became an art teacher at the Moravian Female Teachers Training College and taught art and music at the Antigua Girls' High School. Both her sisters also became music teachers. She married Robert E. Higgins in 1921. During the 1940s she helped establish the Antigua Artists Society, as well as teaching and arranging music for the Hell's Gate Steel Orchestra.

Following the 1958 West Indies federal elections, Higgins was appointed to the Federal Senate as a representative of the West Indies Federal Labour Party. She was one of two female members (alongside Marguerite Wyke of Trinidad and Tobago) and the first female parliamentarian from Antigua. She was awarded an MBE in the 1961 New Year Honours.

Higgins died in July 1966.
