= Wilfred Andrew Rose =

Trinidad and Tobago diplomat and politician (1922–2008)

The Honourable Wilfred Andrew Rose MP

Member of the Federal Parliament of the West Indies Federation
- In office 1958–1962
- Preceded by: Office established
- Succeeded by: Office disestablished
- Constituency: St. Anns
Diplomatic offices
Ambassador to Brazil
In office 1968–1970
Preceded by	Harry Major (as Chargé d’Affaires)
Succeeded by	Harry Major
High Commissioner to the United Kingdom
In office 1964–1968
Preceded by	Learie Constantine
Succeeded by	Donald C. Granado
High Commissioner to Canada
In office 1962–1964
Preceded by	Office established
Succeeded by	?

Personal details
- Born: 1922 Trinidad and Tobago
- Died: 2008 (aged 85–86)
- Party: People's National Movement
- Other political affiliations: West Indies Federal Labour Party
- Spouse: Olga Marcano
- Children: 1

Wilfred Andrew Rose (1922–2008) was a Trinidadian and Tobagonian diplomat and politician who served in the Federal Parliament of the West Indies Federation from 1958 to 1962. A member of the People's National Movement, Rose also held several ambassadorial posts, most notably serving as Trinidad and Tobago's Ambassador to the United Kingdom from 1964 until 1968.

== Biography ==
Rose was born in 1922 in Trinidad and Tobago, which was then a British colony. In the 1956 Trinidad and Tobago general election, Rose ran for the Caroni South constituency of the Legislative Council of Trinidad and Tobago as a member of the People's National Movement; however, he was defeated by an ascendant Simbhoonath Capildeo, receiving just 20% of the vote compared to Capildeo's 62%. In 1958, Rose was elected to the House of Representatives of the West Indies Federation for the St. Anns constituency. While in parliament, Rose served as the Minister of Communications and Works. Rose served in parliament until the Federation's dissolution in 1962.

Later in 1962, Rose was appointed as the first Trinidad and Tobago High Commissioner to Canada, serving until 1964. From 1964 until 1968, he served as the Trinidad and Tobago High Commissioner to the United Kingdom. In 1968, Rose was appointed as the first Ambassador to Brazil, serving until 1970. Rose would later also serve as the head of mission to the European Economic Commission and the United Nations.

Rose died in 2008.
