= Marguerite Wyke =

Trinidadian politician, artist and writer (1908–1995)

Marguerite Wyke OBE
- from Ebony magazine, June 1960
- Born: Marguerite N. Abrams; May 1908; Jersey City, New Jersey, United States
- Died: 1995 (aged 86–87)
- Other names: Peggy Abrams, Marguerite N. Wyke, Peggy Wyke
- Education: Lincoln High School; New York University; New Jersey State Normal School; Sorbonne; Académie Ranson; University of the West Indies
- Occupations: Teacher, poet, artist, politician
- Years active: 1929–1975

Marguerite Wyke OBE (May 1908 – 1995) was an American-born Trinidadian teacher, poet, artist and politician. After growing up in Jersey City, New Jersey, and working as a teacher, she married and moved to Canada for a decade and then relocated to Trinidad. Writing for various journals and newspapers, and cultivating the artistic community in Trinidad, she became active in local politics. Renouncing her U.S. citizenship, Wyke became a Trinidadian citizen in 1953 and became active in the island's governance. With the establishment of the West Indies Federation, she was appointed as one of two senators from Trinidad and Tobago and one of only two women senators to serve in the Federal Parliament of the West Indies Federation. When the Federation dissolved, Wyke returned to her artistic endeavors, publishing poetry and participating in various art media.

== Early life ==
Marguerite N. Abrams was born in May 1908 in New Jersey to Jessie B. M. (née Wardlaw) and James Edward Abrams, who were both African-American. She was the oldest child of the Pullman porter, James, having younger siblings James Jr. and Bessie (or Jessie). Abrams graduated from Lincoln High School in 1926 and then went on to study at New York University. Simultaneously taking art courses at the Grand Central School of Art, she graduated with a degree in English literature. Continuing her studies, Abrams completed a teaching degree at the New Jersey State Normal School at Jersey City.

== Career ==
By 1929, Abrams was working as a teacher in the Jersey City Public School System. Abrams began publishing poetry, in such journals as Opportunity Magazine and taught until her marriage on 18 February 1933 to David Arnold Wyke. He was a Trinidadian physician who at the time of their marriage was working in Toronto, Ontario, Canada, as the only black physician in the city. The young couple moved to Toronto after their marriage where David continued his work as a doctor and Marguerite continued publishing, contributing to the Canadian Forum. The couple were part of the politically active West Indian community living in Toronto. While her husband was politically conservative, Wyke's politics were leftist and she joined the Co-operative Commonwealth Federation (CCF) while living in Canada.

In 1946, the couple relocated to Trinidad, where Wyke became affiliated with the Caribbean Socialist Party. Continuing her writing, she published articles for The Teachers Herald, the journal of the Teacher's Economic and Cultural Association (TECA). In 1952, she and her husband traveled to Europe for further education. While he studied in Scotland, she attended courses at the Sorbonne in Paris, and also studied under Étienne Martin at the Académie Ranson. Wyke also took courses and graduated from the University of the West Indies. She actively cultivated development of the arts in Trinidad, serving as a committee member of the Trinidad and Tobago Art Society, of which she became vice president in 1956. She brought artists and writers including Karl Broodhagen and Langston Hughes to Trinidad.

In 1953, Wyke renounced her US citizenship to become a Trinidadian citizen, with the intent of helping Eric Williams in his rise to prominence. She was involved in the PNM from early days, making speeches, serving on committees and writing for the newspaper. In the mid-1950s, she worked with working-class women through the projects of the Women's League for the People's National Movement (PNM). She assisted in the compilation of reports evaluating the Trinidadian economy and society and served on the committee that analyzed appointing West Indians to positions to govern their own affairs. During the same time frame, Wyke worked on the planning of the Caribbean Festival of the Arts and made several trips to other islands to attend music and art festivals.

When the West Indies Federation was established in 1958, Wyke was appointed as one of the two women senators to serve in the national parliament of the new federal state. Wyke represented Trinidad and Tobago along with Deonarayan Maharajh and the other woman Senator was Bertha Higgins of Antigua and Barbuda. She actively pursued legislation to secure the rights of West Indians, working on legislation to fight racism, including urging the British parliament to protect Caribbeans living in Britain and protect workers from exploitative recruitment policies. Wyke was opposed to free movement among the Caribbean islands, fearing that large influxes of people would over-tax limited resources. She also worked to establish the first art scholarships on the island to help young artists gain their education and protested the use of women in beauty contests held to improve tourism prospects.

After her service in the Senate, Wyke returned to artistic pursuits and promoting development of the arts, as well as heritage protection programs. In 1961, she exhibited works for the opening of Nina's Art Gallery, one of the first galleries to open in Trinidad. She was chair of the committee organized to prepare for the celebrations of Trinidad and Tobago's Independence, which featured a calypso competition. Wyke was appointed an Officer of the Order of the British Empire in 1963 for her service to Trinidad as chair of the Independence Celebrations Committee. In the 1970s, Wyke served as the chair of the advisory board to the Central Library of Trinidad and Tobago.

In her lifetime, though Wyke worked in multiple artistic media, including fused glass, mosaic, painting, and pottery, she was best known for her sculpture. She produced works that are held in private collections throughout the Caribbean, Canada, Denmark and the United States.

== Death and legacy ==
Wyke died around 1995. In 2002, the Cultural Center Art Gallery of the Inter-American Development Bank in Port of Spain, hosted an art exhibition for the country's 40th anniversary of independence. Wyke was one of several featured artists included in the show.

== Selected works ==
=== Writings ===
- "Review of Native Son by Richard Wright". Canadian Forum. 1940.
- "A Plume of Dust". Caribbean Quarterly: An Anthology of West Indian Poetry. 5 (3): 224. April 1958.
- "Ash Wednesday". Caribbean Quarterly. 1958.
- "On Remembering Immortelles". BIM. 7 (27). Wildey, Barbados: Coles Printery Ltd. for Young Men's Progressive Club: 126–127. December 1958.
- "Calypsonian". Voices. 1 (6): 8. 1966.
- "Guyana". Voices. 1 (1): 12. 1964.
- "History Leaves No Memorials to the Poor". Voices. 1 (2): 12. 1964.
- "A Note on Becoming a Foreigner". New World Quarterly (1–2): 67. 1966–1967.
- "Last Lap". BIM. 15 (57). Wildey, Barbados: Coles Printery Ltd. for Young Men's Progressive Club: 34. March 1974.
