= Prime Minister of the West Indies Federation =

Head of government, 1958–1962

- Coat of arms of the West Indies

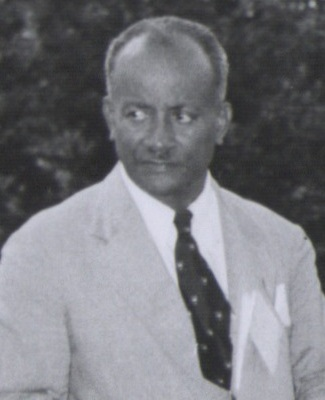
- Only officeholder Grantley Herbert Adams; 18 April 1958 – 31 May 1962
- Style: The Right Honourable
- Appointer: Governor-General of the West Indies Federation
- Formation: 18 April 1958
- First holder: Grantley Herbert Adams
- Final holder: Grantley Herbert Adams
- Abolished: 31 May 1962

The prime minister of the West Indies Federation was the head of government of the short lived West Indies Federation (also known as the British Caribbean Federation), which consisted of ten provinces: Antigua (with Barbuda), Barbados, Dominica, Grenada, Jamaica (with the Cayman Islands and the Turks and Caicos Islands), Montserrat, St. Christopher-Nevis-Anguilla, St. Lucia, St. Vincent, and Trinidad and Tobago. The federation was formed on 3 January 1958, and was formally dissolved on 31 May 1962.

The prime minister was elected by the House of Representatives from among its members, constitutionally acted as an advisor to the governor-general of the West Indies Federation, and was involved in economic planning, but had very little power beyond those roles, being junior to the position of governor-general.

Starting in January 1959, the governor-general, Lord Hailes, attempted to get Adams to step down so he could be replaced with Norman Manley, whom Hailes saw as endorsing "decentralised federation" and being able to bring "most responsible people in Jamaica" with him.

== List of officeholders ==
Parties

West Indies Federal Labour Party

No.	Portrait	Name (Birth–Death)	Term of office			Political party	Election	Government	Ref.
No.	Portrait	Name (Birth–Death)	Took office	Left office	Time in office	Political party	Election	Government	Ref.
1		Grantley Herbert Adams (1898–1971); MP for Barbados	18 April 1958	31 May 1962	4 years, 43 days	West Indies Federal Labour Party	1958	Adams	

== See also ==
- Prime Minister of the Netherlands Antilles (Dutch West Indies)
- 1961 Jamaican Federation of the West Indies membership referendum
