= Roy Joseph =

Trinidad and Tobago politician (1909–1979)

Roy Adolphus Joseph (1909–1979) was a Trinidad and Tobago politician. He served as Mayor of San Fernando, Member of the Legislative Council, Minister of Education and Social Services, and Member of the Federal Parliament of the West Indies Federation.

Born in San Fernando to Lebanese immigrants, Joseph was educated at Naparima College. He served two terms as Mayor of San Fernando - 1946-1947 and 1947-1948. In 1950 he contested the General Elections and won the San Fernando seat. As a member of the Legislative Council between 1950 and 1956 he served as Minister of Education and Social Services. In the 1956 General Elections he lost to Winston Mahabir of the newly formed People's National Movement. In the 1958 Federal Elections Joseph won the San Fernando-Naparima seat on a Democratic Labour Party ticket. With the collapse of the Federation he retired from politics. In 1979 he was killed in a freak automobile accident at his gas station.

Joseph was married to the former Dolly Ishmael (aunt of Manny Ramjohn) and had three daughters.
