= Daysh =

Daysh is a surname. Notable people with the surname include:

- Florence Daysh (1908–1979), Barbadian social worker and politician
- Zena Daysh (1914–2011), New Zealand human ecologist

== See also ==
- Frank Renouf (1918–1998), partner of New Zealand stockbroker Daysh, Renouf & Co
