= Antigua and Barbuda under the West Indies Federation =

Province of the West Indies Federation

Territory of Antigua
- 1958-1962
- Flag (1956-1962) Coat of arms
- Status: Province of the West Indies Federation
- Currency: British West Indies dollar
- Today part of: Antigua and Barbuda

This article covers the history of Antigua and Barbuda from 1958 to 1962, when it was a province of the West Indies Federation.

Even though the province included Barbuda and Redonda, the province was simply known as Antigua.

== Early federation (1958-1959) ==
=== 1958 ===
Antigua joined the West Indies Federation on 3 January. On 6 January, the Governor prorogued the Legislative Council for the first time of the year. On 16 January, polling divisions were established for the 1958 West Indies federal elections by the Supervisor of Elections. From 23 January to 26 January, the Governor-General of the West Indies Federation his first official visit to the province. Preparations for the federal election continued during the winter, with the notification of election being published on 6 March. On 8 April, the report on the federal election for the two members of Parliament from Antigua was made. The results on the colony-wide level are as follows:

Candidate	Votes received	% of total votes
Bradley Carrott	5,320	45.92%
Novelle Richards	5,290	45.67%
J. R. Henry	973	8.40%
Rejected ballots	169	
Spoilt ballots	10	
Total voters	6,387	
Total votes	11,583	
Registered voters	18,352	

After the election, due to both Carrott and Richards being members of the Legislative Council, two by-elections had to be held to fill the vacancies they left. On 3 May, Wilfred Jacobs was appointed as the Administrator of Antigua. On 11 May, the Antigua Defence Force was significantly reformed, with the colony retaining its force even when it was a member of the federation.

=== 1959 ===
On 1 January, the yearly Appropriation Ordinance was proposed. On 8 January, the report on the two by-elections held in May 1958 was published. On 26 January, the Legislative Council was prorouged. On 10 February, the Appropriation Ordinance was assented to, being the first law of 1959. The colony continued to maintain a military expenditure. In Barbuda, a notice for the potential opening of a mail tender service between Antigua and Barbuda was published by the Administrator on 11 March. Barbuda continued to be run by a warden during this period. On 4 June 1959, the Governor departed Antigua for the United Kingdom to participate in a constitutional conference. On 27 August 1959, an amendment to the Barbuda Ordinance was passed, mostly relating to deer. On 12 November 1959, the Federal Supreme Court sat in Antigua. On 7 December 1959, a bill amending the Antigua Constitution and Elections Ordinance was published, following the conference in June. In the edition of the Gazette published on 31 December, it was announced that the official residence of the Administrator would now be Government House, and that various postal stamps relating to the adaptation of the new constitutional amendment would be available for sale. On 31 December, the Legislative Council was also prorogued.

== Self-governance (1960-1962) ==
On 1 January, Antigua became self-governing, with Vere Bird now being the Chief Minister. The Executive Council became composed of the Chief Minister, three other ministers, one other member, and the ex officio attorney-general. The Chief Minister was to be the member of the Legislative Council who can command the support of the majority of members. The ministers must be members of the Legislative Council, and be appointed by the Administrator on the advice of the Chief Minister. The ministers before the amendment were Edmund Lake for social services, Vere Bird for trade and production, Bradley Carrott without portfolio, and Ernest Williams for public works and communication. On 31 May 1960 the Antigua Constitution and Elections Ordinance was further amended to create new constituencies, including the Barbuda constituency. On 6 July 1960, Henry Joseph Elwin was appointed as Supervisor of Elections and various preparations were made for the upcoming 1960 Antiguan general election. On 29 November 1960, the election was held, resulting in a victory for the Antigua Labor Party.

On 31 May 1962, the West Indies Federation was abolished.
