= Novelle Richards =

Antiguan politician

Member of the Legislative Council of Antigua
- In office 20 December 1951 – 29 October 1960
- Preceded by: constituency established
- Succeeded by: George Sheppard
- Constituency: St. John's Rural South

Member of the Federal Parliament of the West Indies Federation
- In office 25 March 1958 – 31 May 1962; Served with Bradley Carrott
- Preceded by: constituency established
- Succeeded by: constituency abolished
- Constituency: Antigua

Personal details
- Born: November 24, 1917
- Died: 1986
- Party: Antigua Labour Party
- Other political affiliations: West Indies Federal Labour Party
- Relations: Gaston Browne (grandson)

Novelle Hamilton Richards (24 November 1917 – 1986) was an Antigua Labour Party politician.

Richards worked as the editor of the The Workers' Voice newspaper from 1951 to 1958. He was elected as representative for St. John's Rural South in the 1951 general election and served until 1960. Richards was also a member of the Federal Parliament of the West Indies, being one of two representatives for the province of Antigua along with Bradley Carrott. He was also a cabinet minister in the West Indies Federation from 1958 to 1962. He was appointed as the President of Antigua Senate in 1967. He was then West Indies Association's commissioner to Canada from 1967 to 1972. Since 1972 he was director of Antigua department of tourism and trade in Canada, up until 1979 or later.

Richards was the lyrical composer of "Fair Antigua, We Salute Thee" and has a secondary school named after him in Tomlinson. He is the grandfather of prime minister Gaston Browne.
