= Achong =

Achong is a surname. Notable people with the surname include:

- Bert Achong (1928–1996), Trinidad and Tobago pathologist
- Ellis Achong (1904–1986), Trinidad and Tobago cricketer and umpire
