= West Indies Democratic Labour Party =

- Leader: Alexander Bustamante
- Parliamentary leader: Ashford Sastri Sinanan
- Founder: Alexander Bustamante
- Founded: May 1957
- Dissolved: May 31, 1962
- Succeeded by: Caribbean Democrat Union (de facto)
- Ideology: Labourism; Anti-communism; Anti-socialism; Agrarianism; Liberalism; Liberal conservatism Confederalism; Civic nationalism
- Political position: Centre to centre-right

The West Indies Democratic Labour Party (DLP), sometimes known simply as the Democrats, was one of two Federal parties in the short-lived West Indies Federation, the other being the West Indies Federal Labour Party (WIFLP). The party was organised by Sir Alexander Bustamante to counter the WIFLP led by his cousin Norman Manley. In the 1958 West Indies federal elections, the party lost, winning 19 of the 45 seats in the Federal Parliament of the West Indies Federation.

== History ==
It was founded in May 1957 and was originally composed of parties from Jamaica, Trinidad and Tobago, St. Lucia a number of individuals (since unlike the WIFLP, the DLP admitted both parties and individuals). Bustamante was unanimously elected as leader of the party, while Ashford Sinanan (Trinidad), Victor Bryan (Trinidad) and Ebenezer Joshua (St. Vincent) were chosen as first, second and third deputy leaders, respectively. Other members of the executive included Donald Sangster, Mrs. Rose Leon, Morris Cargill (all from Jamaica) and Bhadase Sagan Maraj (Trinidad).

== Membership ==
The party was a confederation of local parties from each of the constituent territories. Generally speaking its constituent parties were the more rural based parties. Individuals (whether or not affiliated with a specific party) could be admitted. This led to the situation wherein Bhadase Sagan Maraj as leader of the People's Democratic Party of Trinidad was admitted as a member, but the party apparently was not. Other individuals admitted included Ashford Sinanan (also of the People's Democratic Party of Trinidad), Albert Gomes and Roy Josephs.

=== Affiliated parties (incomplete) ===
Island	DLP Member	
Island	Name	abbr.
Antigua and Barbuda		
Barbados	Democratic Labour Party	DLP
Dominica		
Grenada		
Jamaica: Cayman Islands; Turks and Caicos Islands	Jamaica Labour Party	JLP
Montserrat		
Saint Christopher-Nevis-Anguilla		
Saint Lucia	People's Progressive Party	PPP
Saint Vincent and the Grenadines	People's Political Party	PPP
Trinidad and Tobago	Democratic Labour Party	DLP

== 1958 West Indies federal elections ==
In the Federal elections of 1958 the WIFLP won the majority of the votes in the Federal Parliament. Since neither Manley nor Bustamante had contested the Federal elections, Sir Grantley Adams became the Federal Prime Minister, while Ashford Sinanan was the (DLP) Leader of the Opposition.

=== Manifesto ===
The DLP's election platform emphasized West Indian unity, freedom of worship and speech, encouragement of trade unions, a climate favourable to both private industry and labour, development of human and economic resources, and expansion of tourism. It pledged to work for the entry of British Guiana and British Honduras into the Federation, promised to press for loans and technical assistance to raise standards of living and avoid high taxation and urged a strengthening of existing ties with the United Kingdom, United States and Canada and fostering "very strong and profitable relationships" with neighbouring countries.

== Dissolution ==
Under criticism for his anti-Federalism, Bustamante resigned from the DLP. He then held a referendum in Jamaica which favoured withdrawal from the Federation. This left Trinidad and Tobago with a disproportionate burden of the Federal budget, leading Eric Williams to lead them out of the Federation. This action led the British to dissolve the Federation.
