= JTA Supermarkets =

Chain of supermarkets in Trinidad and Tobago

- Industry: Food retailing
- Founded: 1943
- Headquarters: Trinidad and Tobago
- Number of locations: 5
- Key people: Christopher Mack (managing director); Carl Mack (chairman)
- Parent: J.T. Allum & Co. Ltd.
- Website: jtasupermarkets.com

JTA Supermarkets Limited is a chain of five supermarkets in Trinidad and Tobago.

== History ==
JTA Supermarkets began as J. T. Allum and Company Limited, a dry goods store at 100 High Street, San Fernando which was established in 1943. The store was owned by John Thomas Allum and managed by Carlton K. Mack, a distant relative of Allum who had immigrated to Trinidad and Tobago from China. In 1955 Mack entered an arrangement to purchase the company from the Allum family over the course of ten years. Eric Allum Poon remained chairman until his death in 1961. Mack became the chairman in 1961.

In 1948 the company opened its first supermarket, in Couva followed by its second at Allum's Shopping Centre in Marabella. In 1964 a third supermarket was opened in Carlton Centre, San Fernando, which was then the country's largest shopping mall. In 1976 a fourth Allum's Supermarket was opened in the newly built Cross Crossing Shopping Complex, also in San Fernando. The Couva store relocated to the Couva Shopping Complex in 1981.

Allum's Supermarkets were sold to the McEnearney Alstons conglomerate in 1978; J. T. Allum and Company remained the property owner and landlord. In 1988 J. T. Allum and Company and McEnearney Alstons were unable to come to an agreement to continue the arrangement, and the supermarkets were returned to the control of the Mack family and rebranded as JTA Supermarkets.

== Operations ==
JTA has shops in Carlton Centre, Cross Crossing, Marabella, Corinth and Couva, each of 20,000–30,000 square feet. The 650,000 square feet C3 Centre shopping mall is amongst the largest in the region and the stores within it include a 50,000 square feet branch of JTA Supermarkets which opened in 2016.
