= Yvonne Barr =

Irish virologist (1932–2016)

- Barr in 1962
- Born: Yvonne Margaret Barr; 11 March 1932; Carlow, Ireland
- Died: 13 February 2016 (aged 83); Melbourne, Australia
- Education: Trinity College Dublin; University of London
- Known for: Epstein–Barr virus
- Spouse: Stuart Balding (m. 1965)
- Children: 2
- Scientific career
- Fields: Virology
- Doctoral advisor: Anthony Epstein

Yvonne Margaret Balding (née Barr; 11 March 1932 – 13 February 2016) was an Irish virologist who co-discovered the Epstein–Barr virus (EBV), which, because it identified a virus as a cause of cancer in humans, has been called "one of the 20th century's most significant scientific discoveries."

Barr's role in the discovery of EBV, also called human herpesvirus 4, was instrumental, as she prepared the samples used for experimentation as well as characterized the morphological and biological characteristics of the virus.

== Education and career ==
Barr was Head Prefect at Banbridge Academy Secondary School and graduated in 1953 with honours in zoology from Trinity College, Dublin. Following her graduation Barr held several posts at veterinary and medical research laboratories in the UK and Canada.

Barr began working as a research assistant in 1955, gaining laboratory skills. While at the London National Institute for Medical Research she mastered cell propagation, specifically the technique called cell culturing. Using this technique, she studied the bacterium determined to cause leprosy, also known as Hansen's disease. At the University of Toronto, her work as a research assistant involved studying the pathogen associated with canine distemper virus.

In 1963, Barr was the first of two research assistants employed by the English pathologist and virologist Michael Anthony Epstein, who had received a research grant from the US National Institutes of Health (NIH). They were based at the Bland-Sutton Institute of Pathology at Middlesex Hospital, London, and Epstein became her PhD research supervisor.

"Barr was by then known for her superior laboratory skills," and her ability to grow cells under controlled conditions was "key to the research," according to Gregory J. Morgan, in Cancer Virus Hunters; A History of Tumor Virology (2022), not least because Epstein "was struggling with" cell propagation techniques. According to The Irish Times, Barr's initial impression was that "Epstein was throwing out the good cells" too soon, whereas her methods enabled the team to develop a sufficiently large cluster of cells for Bert Achong, "an expert in electron microscopy" who was Epstein's second research assistant, to obtain an image sufficient for Epstein to identify a new herpes virus.

In 1964, working together, Barr and Epstein discovered EBV. (The virus was named for the cell culture in which it was identified.) Prior to determining specifics about EBV, Epstein, Barr, and Achong published their preliminary research in The Lancet. University of Pennsylvania researchers later confirmed the new virus as responsible for the type of tumor the team had been studying.

Barr graduated from the University of London in 1966 with a PhD. When she married, moved to Australia, and was unable to obtain a research position there, she became a teacher of physics, biology, chemistry, and mathematics in various private high schools.

== Personal life ==
Barr was born in Carlow, Ireland, the oldest of Robert and Gertrude Barr's four children. Her father was a banking manager.

Barr married Australian Stuart Balding, an industrial chemist, in 1965. They moved to Australia in 1966 and had two children, Kirsten and Sean Balding. Barr died in Melbourne, Australia, at the age of 83.
