= Anthony Epstein =

British pathologist (1921–2024)

Sir Anthony Epstein CBE FRS FMedSci
- Born: Michael Anthony Epstein; 18 May 1921; London, England
- Died: 6 February 2024 (aged 102); London, England
- Education: St Paul's School, London; Trinity College, Cambridge; Middlesex Hospital Medical School
- Known for: Epstein–Barr virus
- Spouse: Lisbeth Knight (m. 1950; sep. 1965)
- Partner: Kate Ward
- Children: 3
- Awards: Paul Ehrlich and Ludwig Darmstaedter Prize (1973); Knight Bachelor (1991); Royal Medal (1992)
- Scientific career
- Fields: Virology
- Workplaces: University of Bristol
- Doctoral students: Yvonne Barr

Sir Michael Anthony Epstein (/ˈɛpstaɪn/ EP-styne, Yiddish: [ˈɛpʃtejn]; 18 May 1921 – 6 February 2024) was a British pathologist and academic. He was one of the discoverers of the Epstein–Barr virus, along with Yvonne Barr and Bert Achong.

== Early life ==
Epstein was born in London on 18 May 1921, and educated at St Paul's School, London; Trinity College, Cambridge; and Middlesex Hospital Medical School.

== Career ==
Epstein was Professor of Pathology (1968–1985) and head of department (1968–1982) at the University of Bristol. He was a fellow of Wolfson College, Oxford, from 1986 until 2001, and was an honorary fellow from 2001 until his death.

In 1979 he was elected a Fellow of the Royal Society (FRS) and was its vice-president from 1986 to 1991. He was awarded its Royal Medal in 1992. Epstein was appointed Commander of the Order of the British Empire (CBE) in the 1985 Birthday Honours, and knighted in the 1991 New Year Honours. Epstein was also a founding Fellow of the Academy of Medical Sciences in 1998. In 2006, Epstein was awarded a Doctor of Science (DSc) degree by Bristol.

== Burkitt lymphoma studies ==
Epstein was the first person to propose that Burkitt's lymphoma was a cancer caused by a virus. Upon hearing a lecture given by surgeon Denis Parsons Burkitt in 1961 about this newly described cancer, Epstein changed his research focus from cancer-causing viruses in chickens to searching for a viral origin of Burkitt's lymphoma. After more than two years of working with tumour cells from Burkitt's patients and subsequently working to isolate a virus from them, the Epstein–Barr virus was finally discovered in February 1964.

In a tribute to Epstein in his 100th year, the European Association for Haematopathology noted that his "perseverance, rigorous scientific observations and a bit of serendipity" resulted in the first cell culture in suspension from human lymphocytes. In 1963, a flight from Uganda was supposed to deliver fresh tumour samples into a foggy London. The flight was diverted to Manchester causing a delay in delivery. When the samples finally arrived into London, they seemed useless, containing a cloudy fluid. However, under the microscope the cloudiness was not due to bacteria, as originally thought, but to huge numbers of viable, free-floating lymphoma cells. Thus, the first cell culture of Burkitt lymphoma was achieved, designated EB cells. In 1964, using electron microscopy, Anthony Epstein and his research assistant Bert Achong discovered viral particles in EB cells, resulting in the seminal paper published in 1964, "Virus particles in cultured lymphoblasts from Burkitt's lymphoma" by Epstein, Achong and Barr. This was the first demonstration of viral particles in a human tumour.

== Personal life and death ==
In 1950, Epstein married Lisbeth Knight. Together they had three children: a daughter and two sons. They separated in 1965. In later life, his long-term partner was the virologist Kate Ward.

Epstein turned 100 in May 2021. He died on 6 February 2024 at his home in London, at the age of 102.

He was a Patron of Humanists UK.
