= Federal Parliament of the West Indies Federation =

- Coat of arms of the West Indies Federation

Type
- Type: Bicameral
- Houses: Senate; House of Representatives

History
- Founded: April 1958
- Disbanded: July 1962

Leadership
- Monarch: Elizabeth II
- Governor-General: The Lord Hailes
- President of the Senate: Allen Montgomery Lewis, Federalist (until 1959); Arnott Cato, Federalist (after 1959)
- Speaker of the House: Erskine Ward, Federalist
- Prime Minister: Grantley Adams, Federalist
- Leader of the Opposition: Ashford Sinanan, Democrat

Structure
- Seats: 64 (19 Senators, 45 MPs)
- Senate political groups: Government (15) Federalist (15) Opposition (4) Democrat (4)
- House of Representatives political groups: Government (25): Federalist (25); Opposition (20): Democrat (19); Barbados National (1)
- Length of term: 5 years (maximum)

Elections
- Senate voting system: Appointment by the Governor-General
- House of Representatives voting system: FPTP
- Last House of Representatives election: 25 March 1958

Meeting place
- Port of Spain, Trinidad and Tobago

The Federal Parliament of the West Indies Federation was the bicameral legislature in West Indies Federation from 1958 to 1962. It was formally made up of two houses, an appointed Senate (Upper house) and an elected House of Representatives (Lower house).

The governor general, on behalf of the monarch, summoned and appointed the 19 senators, while each of the 45 members of the House of Representatives represented an electoral district, and were elected by voters residing in the district. The governor general also summoned and called together the House of Representatives, and had the power to prorogue or dissolve Parliament, in order to either end a parliamentary session or call a general election.

The only election was held in 1958. It remained for 4 years until the dissolution of the federation in 1962. The official language of the Parliament was English.

== Senate ==
The upper chamber was called the Senate, and it had 19 members appointed by the Governor-General of the West Indies Federation. There were 2 senators from each territory except Montserrat, which only had 1 senator.

Potential Senators must have met certain criteria before they could be nominated to the upper chamber. In order to be eligible for appointment, a person must have been a British subject of at least 21 years of age who has resided in the territory compromised in the Federation for the previous three years. A person would have been ineligible for appointment if they were in bankruptcy, had a mental illness, held an allegiance to a foreign state, had a capital punishment sentence, have been in prison for a time exceeding twelve months, or disqualified to be elected at the House of Representatives. Furthermore, a Senator could not have also served as a civil servant, a member of the armed forces or police, a judge, a public prosecutor, a controller, or a sitting member of the House of Representatives. Senators served for five years.

=== President of the Senate ===
The president of the Senate was the presiding officer of the Senate and assisted by a vice president who was a sitting senator. Both the president and the vice president must not have been a member of the Council of State.

==== List of presidents ====
No.	Name	Term of office		Party	Province	Ref.
No.	Name	Took office	Left office	Party	Province	Ref.
1	Allen Montgomery Lewis	1958	1959	Federalist	Saint Lucia	
2	Arnott Cato	1959	1962	Federalist	Barbados	

== House of Representatives ==
The lower chamber was called the House of Representatives, and it had popularly elected 45 members, where five members were from Barbados, 17 from Jamaica, 10 from Trinidad and Tobago, 1 from Montserrat, and 2 from each of the remaining territories. Montserrat also had a privilege of an alternate member, who served as a substitute member in the absence of the main member. The requirements to stand for election were similar with the requirements for Senate appointment. However, the alternate member for Montserrat was forbidden to stand election as the main member of Montserrat.

=== Speaker of the House of Representatives ===
The speaker of the House of Representatives was the presiding officer of the House of Representatives who must not have been a member of the Council of State. Erskine Ward was the sole speaker during the existence of the Federal Parliament.

==== List of speakers ====
No.	Name	Term of office		Party	Province	Ref.
No.	Name	Took office	Left office	Party	Province	Ref.
1	Erskine Ward	1958	1962	Federalist	Barbados	

== See also ==
- West Indies Federation
- List of legislatures by country
