= Governor-General of the West Indies Federation =

Representative of the monarch of the West Indies Federation

- Coat of arms of the West Indies

- Flag of the governor-general

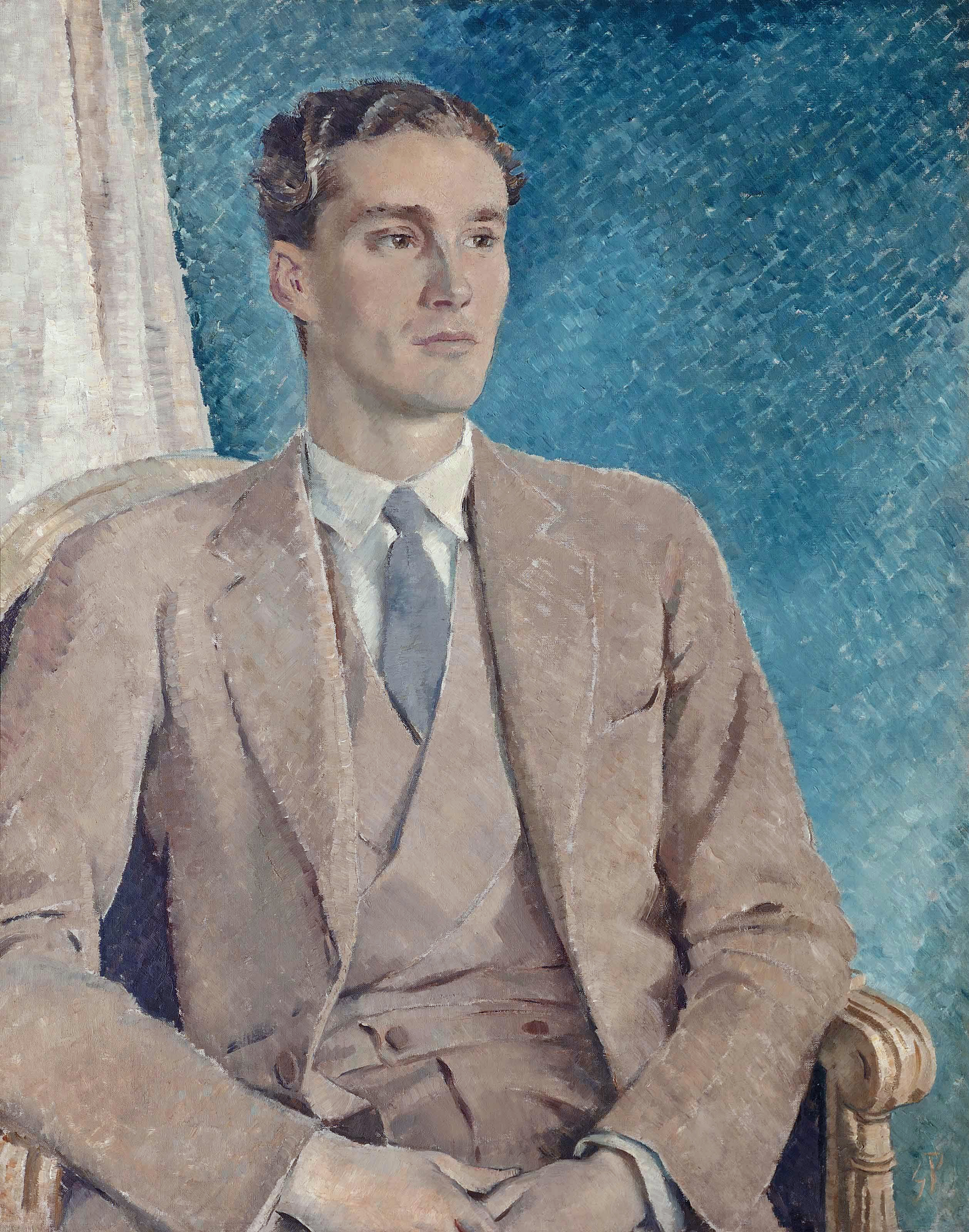
- Only officeholder The Lord Hailes; 3 January 1958 – 31 May 1962
- Style: His Excellency The Right Honourable
- Residence: Governor's House, Port of Spain, Windward Islands
- Appointer: Monarch of the United Kingdom
- Formation: 3 January 1958
- First holder: The Baron Hailes
- Final holder: The Baron Hailes
- Abolished: 31 May 1962

The governor-general of the West Indies Federation was a post in the government of the West Indies. The federation, also known as the British Caribbean Federation, consisted of Antigua (with Barbuda), Barbados, Cayman Islands, Dominica, Grenada, Jamaica, Montserrat, St. Christopher-Nevis-Anguilla, St. Lucia, Saint Vincent, Trinidad and Tobago, and Turks and Caicos Islands. The federation was formed on 3 January 1958, and was formally dissolved on 31 May 1962.

The governor-general was constitutionally required to take advice from the prime minister of the West Indies Federation, but was by far the more powerful and prestigious of the two positions, containing almost all executive authority within the government and containing powers far beyond that of governors-general in the Dominions.

== Governor-general of the West Indies Federation (1958–1962) ==
No.	Portrait	Name (Birth–Death)	Term of office			Monarch	Prime Minister
No.	Portrait	Name (Birth–Death)	Took office	Left office	Time in office	Monarch	Prime Minister
1		Patrick Buchan-Hepburn, 1st Baron Hailes (1901–1974)	3 January 1958	31 May 1962	4 years, 148 days	Elizabeth II	Adams
