= Morris Cargill =

Jamaican writer and politician (1914–2000),

Morris Cargill CD

Federation of the West Indies - Jamaican Labour Party
- In office 1958–1962

Personal details
- Born: 10 June 1914 Kingston, British Jamaica
- Died: 8 April 2000 (aged 85)
- Occupation: Politician; lawyer; businessman; planter; novelist; journalist/columnist
- Nickname(s): Thomas Wright (publishing as); John Morris (pen name)

Morris Cargill CD (10 June 1914 – 8 April 2000), was a Jamaican politician, lawyer, businessman, planter, journalist and novelist. He was also a columnist for the Jamaican Gleaner.

== Biography ==
Cargill was born in Kingston, British Jamaica and educated at Munro College, a prestigious Jamaican secondary school, and the Stowe School in England. Cargill was articled as a solicitor in 1937. During World War II, he worked for the Crown Film Unit in Britain. After the war, he played a role in the development of the coffee liqueur Tia Maria. Returning to the Caribbean he worked as a newspaper editor in Trinidad, and, having acquired a banana plantation in Jamaica, began a career as a columnist for the Gleaner newspapers in 1953 which was to last, with some interruptions, until his death. Until the late 1970s, his articles appeared under the pseudonym Thomas Wright.

In 1958, he was elected to the parliament of the Federation of the West Indies, as a candidate of the Jamaica Labour Party, and served as deputy leader of the opposition in that legislature for the next four years.

In 1964, he persuaded his friend Ian Fleming to write the introductory article for a guidebook to Jamaica called Ian Fleming Introduces Jamaica. In the late 1960s and early 1970s, he collaborated with novelist John Hearne, under the pseudonym "John Morris", on a series of three thrillers—Fever Grass, The Candywine Development, and The Checkerboard Caper—about an imaginary Jamaican secret service. Cargill makes an appearance, in the surprising guise of a high court judge, at the end of Fleming's 1965 novel The Man with the Golden Gun.

For two years in the late 1970s, Cargill left Jamaica because of his opposition to the government of Michael Manley, returning in 1980 to join the campaign against Manley. During this period, Cargill lived in the United States and worked for the publisher Lyle Stuart, editing a study of the Third Reich in Germany called A Gallery of Nazis, and writing a memoir called Jamaica Farewell (an expanded version of which was reissued in 1995).

=== Assassination attempt ===
On 26 May 1969, Keith Clarke shot Cargill in the buttocks, although Cargill survived the attack. Around the same time, Clarke successfully shot and killed industrial chemist Julius Walenta.
