= 1961 Jamaican Federation of the West Indies membership referendum =

- 19 September 1961
- Should Jamaica remain in the Federation of the West Indies?

Results
Choice	Votes	%
Yes	217,319	45.89%
No	256,261	54.11%
Valid votes	473,580	98.82%
Invalid or blank votes	5,640	1.18%
Total votes	479,220	100.00%
Registered voters/turnout	777,965	61.6%

A referendum on continued membership of the Federation of the West Indies was held in Jamaica on 19 September 1961. Voters were asked "Should Jamaica remain in the Federation of the West Indies?" The result was 54% voting "no", resulting in the country leaving the federation and its dissolution in 1962. Voter turnout was 61%.

== Results ==
Choice	Votes	%
For	217,319	45.89
Against	256,261	54.11
Total	473,580	100.00
Valid votes	473,580	98.82
Invalid/blank votes	5,640	1.18
Total votes	479,220	100.00
Registered voters/turnout	777,965	61.60
Source: Nohlen

== Sources ==
- West Indies Federal Archives Centre: File FWI-PM-GA-37: Holding of Referendum in Jamaica.
- West Indies Federal Archives Centre: File FWI-PM-GA-27: Situation Arising from Jamaica Referendum: Report by Professor Lewis - 9 Nov 1961 - 14 Jan 1962.
- Federation, Referendum and Planning for Independence - The Past -- and the Future, Friday, October 13, 1961, The Daily Gleaner
