= Voices (magazine) =

English literary magazine

Voices was a monthly literary magazine published in England from 1919 to 1921. Under the editorship of Thomas Moult, Voices tried to create a new readership for poetry among the young generation awaiting demobilization or returning from the war".

The first edition of Voices appeared in January 1919, costing one shilling. Following the February 1921 issue, the magazine only managed to publish a Summer and Autumn issue before folding.

Some regular contributors, like Neville Cardus, came from Manchester, where Moult had been educated. Jewish contributors included Louis Golding, Maurice Samuel, and the Zionist poet Israel Zangwill; Stephen Winsten, the arts editor, was one of the so-called Whitechapel Boys group, and attracted contributions from David Bomberg, Jacob Kramer, Lucien Pissarro, and Jacob Epstein.

The magazine reviewed war literature and published war poetry by soldier-poets such as Frederick Victor Branford and Edmund Blunden. Open to both Georgian and Modernist poetry, the magazine published artwork by avant-garde artists including Henri Gaudier-Brzeska, Wyndham Lewis, David Bomberg, Jacob Kramer, Edward Wadsworth, Lucien Pissarro, Paul Nash, Eric Gill, Edmund X. Kapp, Anne Estelle Rice, John Duncan Fergusson, and Robert Gibbings. However, several Voices critics used the war experience as an argument against modernist abstraction as "beauty for beauty's sake."
