= Carlton K. Mack =

Chinese-born Trinidad and Tobago businessman

Carlton K. Mack, (July 30, 1911, Heshan, Guangdong – April 1995) born Mack Chuck Kwong, was a Chinese businessman who moved to Trinidad and Tobago at a young age where he built the J.T. Allum & Co. (now JTA Supermarkets) business into one of Trinidad and Tobago's largest enterprises.

Mack pioneered the construction of shopping malls in Trinidad and Tobago, opening Carlton Centre, the Cross Crossing Shopping Complex and Allum Shopping Centre.

Mack became the honorary lifetime president of the China Society, an umbrella organisation created in 1956 to unite the many Chinese associations in Trinidad and Tobago that had been formed my immigrants from China.

Mack was awarded the Humming Bird Medal (Gold) in 1975. In 2013 he was posthumously inducted into the Trinidad and Tobago Chamber of Commerce's Business Hall of Fame.

== See also ==
- Chinese Trinidadian and Tobagonian
