= Fortitude (1804 ship) =

History

United Kingdom
- Name: Fortitude
- Builder: Calcutta
- Launched: 1804
- Fate: Lost circa 1812.

General characteristics
- Tons burthen: 477, or 47740/94 or 480, or 500 (bm)
- Armament: 1810:4 × 12-pounder guns + 2 × 9-pounder carronades
- Notes: Teak-built

Fortitude was launched at Calcutta in 1804. In 1806 she carried Chinese labourers to Trinidad for the British East India Company; she was seized in Trinidad, sold, and sailed to England. From 1808 on she was a West Indiaman. She was lost circa 1812.

== Career ==
The EIC chartered Fortitude, of 500 tons, Hughes, master, to bring 450 Chinese settlers and a cargo of piece goods to Trinidad. She was at Saint Helena on 28 August and arrived in Trinidad on 12 October 1806 with 192–194 men, out of some 200 who had embarked. The EIC recruited these Chinese at Macau, Penang, and Calcutta.

This was the first organised settlement of Chinese people in the Caribbean. It preceded the importation of Chinese indentured labour by over 40 years. The experiment was not a success and the last mention of the community was in 1834.

When Fortitude arrived in Trinidad, Lieutenant Briarly, of the British Royal Navy seized her for violation of the Navigation Acts. She was condemned in the Vice admiralty court and sold. Vessel and cargo sold for $63,000 (about £14–15,000), with half going to the seizer and half to the government. The EIC's agent in Trinidad, Joseph Marryat, objected to the importation of the goods, reporting that it undercut the local merchants who had purchased their goods from the EIC.

Fortitude left Trinidad in July 1807 for England. The legal proceedings subsequent to her seizure had delayed her departure. When she left, Fortitude repatriated 61 of the Chinese, who had exercised their right to repatriation.

Fortitude was admitted to registry in Great Britain on 20 April 1808.

Fortitude first appeared in Lloyd's Register (LR) in 1808.

Year	Master	Owner	Trade	Source
1808	T.Brown	J.Dawson	London–Jamaica	LR
1812	T.Brown	J.&T.Dawson	London–Jamaica	LR

== Fate ==
Although LR last carried Fortitude in its 1814, the Register of Shipping (RS) for 1812 carried the annotation "lost" beneath her name.
