= Raymond Choo Kong =

Actor, producer and stage director

- Born: August 5, 1949
- Died: July 15, 2019 (aged 69)
- Citizenship: Trinidad and Tobago
- Occupation(s): actor, stage director, producer

Raymond Choo Kong (August 5, 1949–July 15, 2019) was a Trinidad and Tobago actor, stage director and producer. He received 18 Cacique Awards for his stage adaptations over the course of 20 years.

== Career ==
Choo Kong grew up in Arima, and was described after his death as "the epitome of what I would consider being a 'gens d'Arime'" by Arima mayor Lisa Morris-Julian.

Choo Kong's career in the theatre spanned 39 years. His early work as an actor was influenced by the Little Carib Theatre where he was mentored by Helen Camps, and the Trinidad Theatre Workshop. He referred Camps as "the woman that taught me theatre". When Camps left the Little Carib Theatre and founded the Trinidad Tent Theatre, Choo Kong joined her.

Choo Kong's first lead role came as Vetsin in Ad, an original work by Roger Israel produced by the Trinidad Tent Theatre. He went on to reprise the role in a reworked version of the musical entitled Rampanalgas Sunrise.

He founded Raymond Choo Kong Productions, which became a prominent theatre company in the 1990s. Choo Kong served as producer, director, playwright and actor and the company staged comedies and thrillers, primarily in Trinidad and Tobago and Guyana.

Choo Kong was best known for producing and acting in commercially successful farces, and has been described as "the innovator of the Trinidadian farce". His work was described by Queen's Hall chairman Helmer Hilwig as "deeply rooted in [Trinidad and Tobago]" and that he "reflected us back to ourselves not only through the scripts he authored but also in how he adapted and localised foreign work".

Choo Kong's other roles included that of Song Liling in a 1989 production of M. Butterfly staged by The Bagasse Company, Max in Bent, staged by the Trinidad Tent Theatre, and a Port of Spain nutsman in The Hummingbird Tree.

== Accolades ==
Choo Kong received 18 Cacique Awards for his work, more than any other individual.

== Death ==
He was found dead from multiple stab wounds in his home in Arima on July 15, 2019 due to an apparent home invasion and robbery. Choo Kong's funeral took place on July 24, 2019 at the Santa Rosa Roman Catholic Church, Woodford St, Arima.

== Personal life ==
Choo Kong had two adoptive sons Ganesh Ramlal and Antonio Tiwari.

Choo Kong was gay. He described himself as having acknowledged his homosexuality through his travel outside of Trinidad and Tobago, and remained a closeted gay man until his mid thirties.

Rudolph Hanamji of PrideTT said he looked to Choo Kong as "elder of the LGBT community" and encouraged him to "come out" as a means to supporting younger LGBTQ people. Choo Kong openly identified publicly as a gay man at the 2018 Pride parade, the country's first Pride parade. At the event, he performed his monologue from Norman, Is That You? where he portrayed a father coming to terms with his son being gay. Choo Kong broke down in tears in both performances, later explaining that in performing the role of Ben Chambers, he felt he was embodying his own father struggling to come to terms with his gay son.
