= Rupert Tang Choon =

West Indian cricketer

Personal information
- Full name: Rupert Paul Tang Choon
- Born: 31 May 1914; Sangre Grande, Trinidad
- Died: 5 September 1985 (aged 71); Sangre Grande, Trinidad
- Batting: Right-handed
- Bowling: Right-arm leg-spin

Domestic team information
- Years: Team
- 1934/35–1954/55: Trinidad

Career statistics
Competition	First-class
Matches	52
Runs scored	2,656
Batting average	34.05
100s/50s	3/17
Top score	132
Balls bowled	3,835
Wickets	59
Bowling average	36.01
5 wickets in innings	2
10 wickets in match	0
Best bowling	6/123
Catches/stumpings	52/–
- Source: CricketArchive, 25 August 2014

Rupert Paul Tang Choon (31 May 1914 – 5 September 1985) was a cricketer who played first-class cricket for Trinidad from 1934 to 1955.

== All-rounder, 1934-35 to 1942-43 ==
Tang Choon played the first part of his career as a leg-spinning all-rounder. In his fourth first-class match, against Barbados in the Inter-Colonial Tournament in 1935–36, he made 72 and 2 batting at number eight, and took 6 for 123 and 3 for 131 in a 36-run victory for Trinidad. In 1938, for R.S. Grant's XI against British Guiana, he took 3 for 13 and 5 for 81 to help his side to an innings victory. His highest score in this period was 83, batting at number seven against Barbados in 1940–41.

He "came near to being chosen to tour England with the 1939 West Indian side" but the leg-spinners Bertie Clarke and John Cameron were preferred.

He played for North Trinidad in the Beaumont Cup from 1934–35 to 1951–52, in the days before the matches had first-class status. In the 1934-35 match he took 8 for 32.

== Batsman, 1943-44 to 1954-55 ==
Tang Choon seldom bowled after the 1942–43 season, taking only one wicket during the rest of his first-class career. His batting improved, however. In his two matches in 1944-45 he scored his first century, 132, 40 and 83. Against MCC in 1947–48, batting now at number five, he scored 103, adding 244 for the fourth wicket in three and a half hours with Gerry Gomez. "A neat, lithe batsman, Tang Choon gave a truly brilliant display," noted Wisden. However, he scored only 7 and 17 in Trinidad's second match against MCC shortly afterwards.

He captained Trinidad in both their matches in 1951–52. He scored 104 and 47 not out against British Guiana in 1953–54, his third and last century. He played his last first-class match in 1954–55 against the Australians when he was 40 years old.
