= Joseph Lennox Pawan =

Trinidadian bacteriologist

Joseph Lennox Donation Pawan
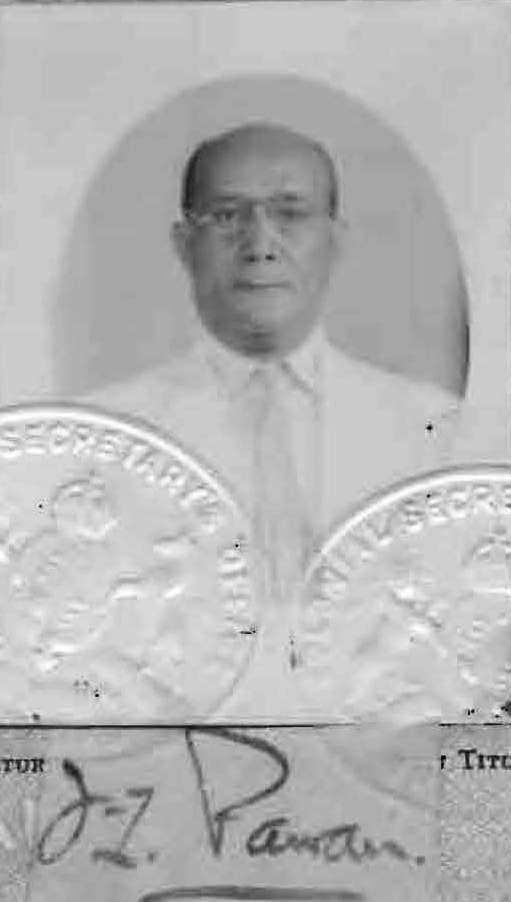
- Pawan's passport photo
- Born: 6 September 1887; Trinidad
- Died: 3 November 1957 (age 70)
- Education: University of Edinburgh, Pasteur Institute
- Known for: Proving Mammal-to-Mammal Rabies propagation
- Scientific career
- Fields: Biotechnology

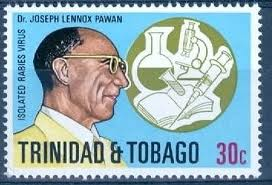
Dr. Joseph Pawan. Commemorative stamp

Joseph Lennox Donation Pawan MBE (6 September 1887 – 3 November 1957) was a Trinidadian bacteriologist who was the first person to show that rabies could be spread by vampire bats to other animals and humans.

== Education and career ==
Born in Trinidad, Pawan was educated at Saint Mary's College in Port of Spain and won an Island Scholarship in 1907. He then went on to the University of Edinburgh, where he graduated in 1912 with bachelor's degrees in medicine and surgery. After studying at the Pasteur Institute in France he returned to Trinidad in 1913, first as an Assistant Surgeon at the Colonial Hospital in Port of Spain, and later as the District Medical Officer in Tobago and Cedros, in southwestern Trinidad.

In 1923 he was appointed as the sole bacteriologist to the government of Trinidad and Tobago. In 1925 there was an outbreak of rabies in cattle in Trinidad, which was first diagnosed as botulism. Humans began contracting rabies in 1929, first diagnosed as poliomyelitis. The outbreak continued until 1937, by which time 89 human fatalities were recorded.

Pawan found the first infected vampire bat in March 1932. He then soon proved that various species of bat, including fruit-eating bats and particularly the common vampire bat (Desmodus rotundus), with or without artificial infection or the external symptoms of rabies, are capable of transmitting rabies for an extended period of time. "Perhaps, the most heretical disclosure was that vampire bats could recover from the furious stage of the disease and were capable of spreading the disease up to five and one half months." It was later shown that fruit bats of the genus Artibeus demonstrate the same abilities. During this asymptomatic stage the bats continue to behave normally and breed. At first, his basic findings that bats transmitted rabies to people and animals were thought fantastic and ridiculed.

Pawan died on 3 November 1957. He was sometimes referred to as John Lennox Pawan by Arthur Greenhall, who was a close friend and associate. It is not certain whether he was ever called "John," or whether the references are misprints.

Dr Pawan’s interests were many and varied. He was the author of numerous papers and studied such subjects as the water supplies of Trinidad; the histology of Aedes and Anophole (sic = Anopheles) mosquitos; sickle-cell anaemia; and the mosquito transmission of Venezuelan Equine Encephalomeyelitis Virus in Trinidad. But he will best be remembered in the annals of medical history along with Louis Pasteur for his contributions to the study of rabies. His research on bat rabies has been considered by rabies investigators over the world to be a classic of epidemiological studies and has had a profound influence on all subsequent studies up to the present time.

== Publications ==
- 1931, Pawan, J. L. "The Water Supplies of Trinidad and Tobago", Journal of Tropical Medicine and Hygiene.
- 1931, Hurst, E. W. and Pawan, J. L. "An Outbreak of Rabies in Trinidad Without history of Bites and with the Symptoms of Acute Ascending Myelitis". The Lancet, 221, 622.
- 1932, Hurst, E. W. and Pawan, J. L. "A Further Account of the Trinidad Outbreak of Acute Rabic Myelitis: histology of the experimental disease." Jour. Path. Bact., 35, 301.
- 1936, Pawan, J. L. "Transmission of the Paralytic Rabies in Trinidad of the Vampire Bat: Desmodus rotundus murinus Wagner, 1840." Annual Tropical Medicine and Parasitol, 30, 8 April 1936:137-56.
- 1936, Pawan, J. L. "Rabies in the vampire bat of Trinidad with Special Reference to the Clinical Course and the Latency of Infection." Reprinted from the Annals of Tropical Medicine and Parasitology. Vol. 30, No. 4, December 1936. Issued by the Liverpool School of Tropical Medicine.
- 1948, Pawan, J. L. "Fruit-Eating Bats and Paralytic Rabies in Trinidad." Reprinted from the Annals of Tropical Medicine and Parasitology, Vol. 42, No. 2, September 1948, pp. 3–12. Issued by the Liverpool School of Tropical Medicine.

== Awards ==
- In the King's Birthday Honours 1934 Pawan was appointed as a member of the Order of the British Empire for his ground-breaking discovery.
- The Pan American Health Organization (PAHO) posthumously named him a "Hero in Health" in 2002.
