= Bert Achong =

Trinidadian scientist (1928–1996)

Bert Geoffrey Achong
- Achong in England
- Born: 6 December 1928; Port of Spain, Trinidad and Tobago
- Died: 20 November 1996 (aged 67); Hampstead, England
- Occupation: Scientist
- Known for: Epstein–Barr virus

Bert Geoffrey Achong (6 December 1928 – 20 November 1996) was a Trinidadian-born pathologist known for co-discovering the Epstein–Barr virus through use of electron microscopy.

== Career ==
Achong was born in Trinidad and Tobago and was of Chinese descent. After excelling in school in Trinidad and Tobago, he was awarded the Jerningham Gold Medal and the Colonial Scholarship to study in Europe.

He moved to Europe at 18 and enrolled at University College Dublin, where he received his medical degree in 1953. In 1955 he moved to London, and worked at Lambeth Hospital in London in Clinical Pathology.

In 1963, he joined Michael Anthony Epstein's research group at Middlesex Hospital. He moved with Epstein to the Department of Pathology at University of Bristol in 1968, where he was a popular lecturer on cellular pathology until his retirement in 1985. He died of a brain tumour in 1996.

== Epstein–Barr virus ==
Achong, Anthony Epstein and Yvonne Barr discovered the first example of a human cancer-causing virus. They published the discovery of the Epstein–Barr virus (EBV) in The Lancet on 28 March 1964.

Achong's role in the discovery of EBV was to prepare and examine cultured cells prepared from Burkitt lymphoma samples by electron microscopy.

== Foamy virus ==
In 1971 Achong made another major discovery, the human foamy virus. This was proved to be the first example of a retrovirus naturally infecting humans.
