= Coat of arms of the West Indies Federation =

The coat of arms of the West Indies Federation was used between 1958 and 1962. The background of the shield bore four equally spaced narrow white stripes with ten orange-gold discs representing each island grouping, undulating horizontally across a blue field representing the Caribbean Sea and the sun shining upon the waves. These devices were based upon the flag originally designed by Edna Manley. A triangle is superimposed on the shield, and the shield is topped by a lion passant guardant. The scroll beneath proclaims To Dwell Together In Unity. The shield is supported on either side by the country's national bird, the pelican, with wings extended. Above this is a helmet topped with a flaming torch held by an upright arm. The torch signifies a beacon to light a path.

The torch design is reflected in the present coats of arms of Barbados, Saint Lucia, and Saint Kitts and Nevis.
