= West Indies Federal Labour Party =

- Parliamentary leader: Grantley Adams
- Founded: June 1956
- Dissolved: May 31, 1962
- Succeeded by: COPPPAL (de facto)
- Ideology: Democratic socialism Federalism; Pro-Commonwealth
- Political position: Centre-left

The West Indies Federal Labour Party (WIFLP), sometimes known simply as the Federalists, was one of two main Federal parties in the short-lived West Indies Federation, the other being the West Indies Democratic Labour Party (DLP) or Democrats. The party was the first national party of the planned West Indies Federation. In the 1958 West Indies federal elections, the party was victorious, winning 25 of the 45 seats in the Federal Parliament of the West Indies Federation.

== History ==
The WIFLP was organised by Norman Manley, Grantley Adams, V. C. Bird, Robert Llewellyn Bradshaw, Joseph Nathaniel France, Eric Gairy, Carl La Corbinière and William Henry Bramble in June 1956 as the Federation of Labour Parties of the British Caribbean. However, at its inaugural conference on September 1, 1956, in St. Lucia, its name was changed to the Caribbean Federal Labour Party. Only later on did its name finally change to the West Indies Federal Labour Party (although it was also mistakenly called the West Indian Federal Labour Party or the West Indies Federal Party).

== Membership ==
The party was a confederation of local parties from each of the constituent territories. Generally speaking its constituent parties were the more urban based parties. Member parties were required to pledge active support of trade union movements and public ownership or control where this would best serve the public interest. Member parties were also required to advocate a society offering equal opportunities for all, regardless of race/colour or religion. Initially there were no Trinidadian parties included and in May 1957, in order to include the Trinidad's non-socialist People's Nation Movement, the constitution of the WIFLP was amended to allow admission of progressive parties and democratic trade unions, whether socialist or not. By the time of the first elections, the WIFLP was a grouping of the ruling parties in each territory except St. Vincent — although in October 1957, both the ruling party of St. Vincent (the People's Political Party) and the opposition party (St. Vincent Labour Party) had applied for membership, the latter was ultimately approved and the former joined the Democratic Labour Party. Associate membership was open to parties in British Guiana and British Honduras.

=== Affiliated parties (incomplete) ===
Island	WIFLP Member	
Island	Name	abbr.
Antigua and Barbuda	Antigua Labour Party	ALP
Barbados	Barbados Labour Party	BLP
Dominica	Dominica Labour Party	DLP
Grenada	Grenada United Labour Party	GULP
Jamaica: Cayman Islands; Turks and Caicos Islands	People's National Party	PNP
Montserrat	Montserrat Trade and Labour Union	MTLU
Saint Christopher-Nevis-Anguilla	Saint Kitts Workers' League	WL
Saint Lucia	Saint Lucia Labour Party	SLP
Saint Vincent and the Grenadines	Saint Vincent Labour Party	SVLP
Trinidad and Tobago	People's National Movement	PNM

== 1958 West Indies federal elections ==
The WIFLP went on to contest and win the Federal elections in 1958. Since neither Manley nor Eric Williams contested the Federal elections, Sir Grantley Adams became the Prime Minister. The Opposition party was the Democratic Labour Party.

At its inaugural conference in St. Lucia, a constitution for the party was drafted providing for a biennial conference and an elected executive council which would act between meetings. This council was to convene at least once a year and was composed of party officers and seven others elected at the biennial conference.

After the successful election, the party suffered from the awkward situation of the two most influential leaders (Manley and Williams) absent from the federal government, and holding a minority of seats from their respective territories Jamaica and Trinidad and Tobago.

=== Manifesto ===
The WIFLP's political manifesto (which formed its election platform) advocated a democratic socialist society, maintenance of close contacts with countries with which the islands had strong cultural and economic links, encouragement of agriculture and tourism, establishment of a central bank to expand credit resources throughout the area, dominion status within five years, full internal self-government in all the unit territories, encouragement of British Guiana, British Honduras and the Bahamas to join the union and an international project for technical and financial aid to the Caribbean.

== Dissolution ==
When Sir Alexander Bustamante won a referendum in Jamaica to leave the Federation, Eric Williams decided that the remaining burden was too great for Trinidad and Tobago to bear alone. Once Trinidad and Tobago declared its intention to leave the Federation, the British government dissolved the West Indies Federation.
