= Grantley Herbert Adams =

Barbadian politician (1898–1971)

The Right Excellent Sir Grantley Adams CMG, QC
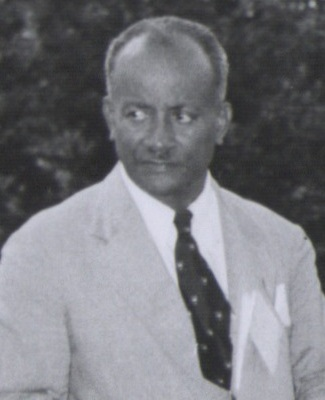
- Adams in 1955.

Prime Minister of West Indies
- In office 18 April 1958 – 31 May 1962
- Monarch: Elizabeth II
- Governor-General: Lord Hailes
- Preceded by: Position established
- Succeeded by: Position abolished

1st Premier of Barbados
- In office 18 February 1954 – 17 April 1958
- Monarch: Elizabeth II
- Governor: Sir Alfred Savage; Sir Robert Arundell
- Preceded by: Position established
- Succeeded by: Hugh Cummins

Personal details
- Born: 28 April 1898
- Died: 28 November 1971 (aged 73) Saint Michael, Barbados
- Party: Barbados Labour
- Other political affiliations: West Indies Federal Labour
- Spouse: Grace Thorne

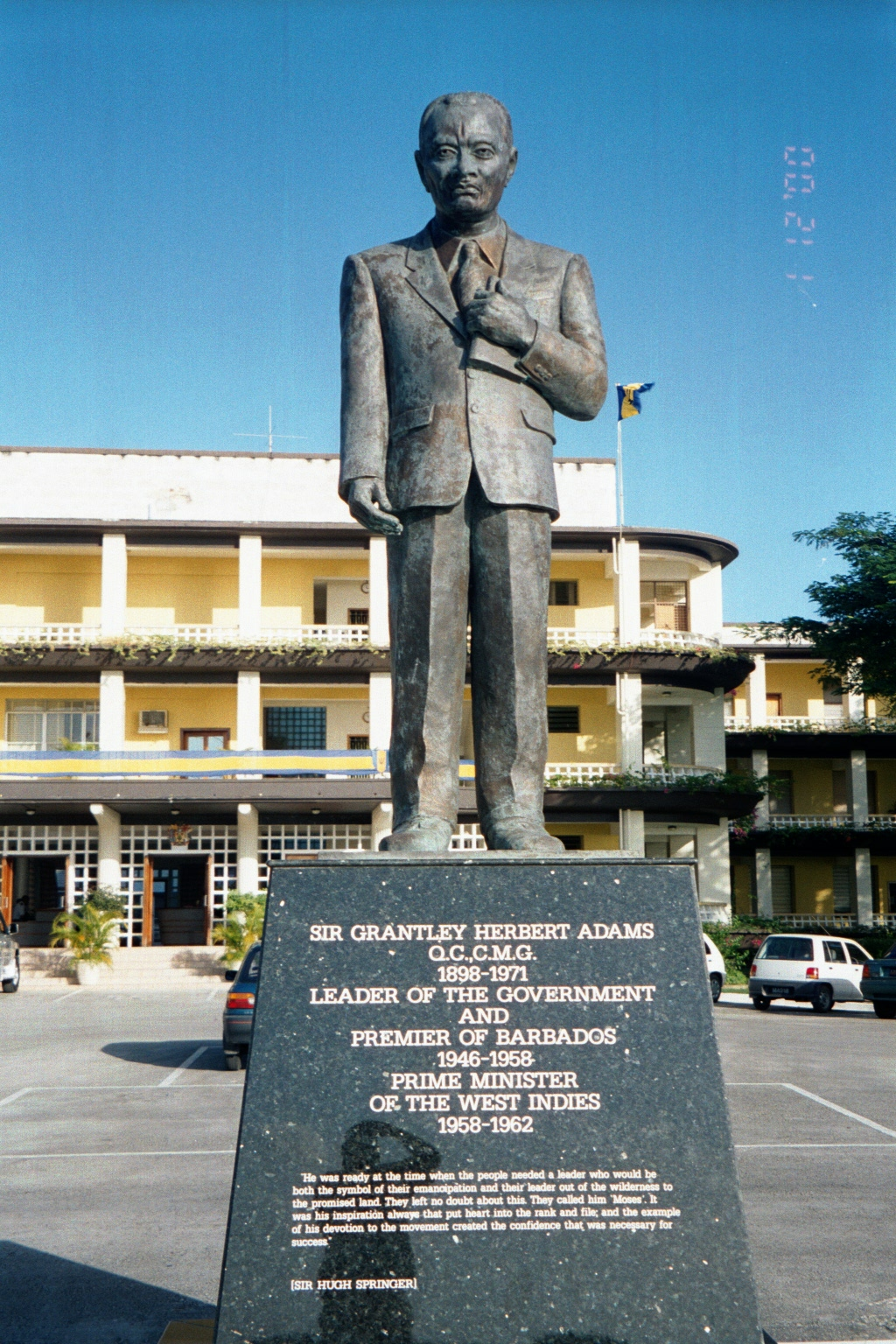
Statue of Sir Grantley Adams in front of the Office of the Cabinet complex in Barbados

Sir Grantley Herbert Adams, CMG, QC (28 April 1898 – 28 November 1971) was a Barbadian politician. He served as the inaugural premier of Barbados from 1954 to 1958 and then became the first and only prime minister of the West Indies Federation from 1958 to 1962. He was a founder of the Barbados Labour Party (BLP), and he was named in 1998 as one of the National Heroes of Barbados.

== Early life ==
Adams was born at Colliston, Government Hill, St. Michael, on 28 April 1898. He was the third child of seven born to Fitzherbert Adams and the former Rosa Frances Turney. Adams was educated at St. Giles and at Harrison College in Barbados. In 1918, he won the scholarship and departed the following year for his undergraduate studies at Oxford University. Adams played a single match of first-class cricket for Barbados during the 1925–26 season, as a wicket-keeper against British Guiana in the Inter-Colonial Tournament.

== Political career ==
Adams's political interest began when he was still a law student in England. He became a member of the Liberal Party at Oxford, finding his views aligned best with those of the Asquithian liberals, in support of private enterprise and trade. Under the Liberal ideals of the era, support of trade union action, representational government and reform of the land ownership and taxation system were towards the overall goal of fostering free trade.

As the British liberals that shaped him rejected the socialism of the British Labour Party, so too did Adams oppose the labour-focused efforts of the Democratic League of Charles Duncan O'Neal and Clennell Wickham on his return to Barbados in 1925. He attacked their strike efforts as editor of the Agricultural Reporter, a planter paper that had opposed workers' rights since its nineteenth century inception. With a growing reputation and popularity among the conservative establishment, Adams's entry into the House of Assembly in 1934 was assured by his role in the deconstruction of the socialist League, including bankrupting one of the key journalistic voices in support of workers' rights.

Nevertheless, Adams's fundamental belief in liberal policies meant that he tended to support pro-working class efforts once he was installed in the House, and continued to espouse many of O’Neal's causes after the man's passing in 1936. Adams therefore consolidated his position by subsuming the fragmented Labour movement he had shattered, and marrying them to his own liberal ideals. It is this face that embraced the workers' rebellions of 1937 and lead to the establishment of the Barbados Labour Party in 1938. Adams was president of the Barbados Workers' Union (BWU) from 1941 to 1954, and was involved in the lowering of the exclusive income qualification in 1942. By 1949, governmental control was wrested from the planters.

In 1952, Adams became a political enemy of Billy Strachan, a Jamaican communist and former Royal Air Force pilot who went onto become a pioneer of Black civil rights in Britain. Adams ordered Strachan to disband the London branch of the Caribbean Labour Congress, an organisation which Strachan was then the leader of. However, the branch voted overwhelmingly in favour of continuing their activities and ignored Adams's demand to disband. In further defiance of Adams, Strachan and fellow communist activist Ferdinand Smith conducted a speaking tour of the Caribbean.

Adams became the first Premier of Barbados in 1954 and additionally Minister of Finance in the same year. Four years later he became the Prime Minister of the West Indies Federation, defeating Ashford Sinanan by two votes. (Sinanan went on to serve as Leader of the Opposition of Trinidad's Democratic Labour Party.) Adams served this role from 1958 to 1962; Barbados was one of the ten provinces of the West Indies Federation, an organisation doomed by nationalistic attitudes and by the fact that its members, as British colonies, held limited legislative power.

Yet he retained his reputation for conservatism through his support of the monarchy. His leaderships's failure to form unions such as the BWU and his rejection of attempts to speed up the push for Independence was used by his opponents as evidence that he was no longer in touch with the needs of his country. Errol Walton Barrow, a fervent reformer, became the new people's advocate. Barrow had left the BLP and formed the Democratic Labour Party (DLP) as the social democrat alternative to Adams's liberal government, one that cleaved more closely to Labour's disruptive traditions. As such, Barrow instituted many progressive social welfare focused on demolishing long-standing class barriers, including free education for all Barbadians, and the School Meals system, the latter being vehemently derided by Adams himself. By 1961, Barrow had replaced Adams as Premier and the DLP controlled the government.

== Personal life ==
Adams was married to Grace Thorne (1904-1990) in 1929 at St. John's Church. Their only child, Tom, himself won the Barbados Scholarship and attended Oxford to become a lawyer. Tom Adams was elected as Barbados's second Prime Minister in 1976.

== Legacy ==
Grantley Adams International Airport, formerly Seawell Airport, located in Christ Church, Barbados, was named after the former Premier in 1976. A statue in honour of Adams is located in front of Government Headquarters at Bay Street, St. Michael.

Adams is one of Barbados's National Heroes. He was the father of Barbados's second Prime Minister following independence, the late J. M. G. "Tom" Adams.

Adams was buried in Bridgetown, Barbados, at the churchyard of the Anglican Cathedral Church of Saint Michael and All Angels on Saint Michael's Row.

The former home of Adams, located on Roebuck Street, Bridgetown, functions as the headquarters of the Barbados Labour Party political group. Adams is featured on the front of the Barbados $100 bill, popularly referred to as a "Grantley".

== See also ==
- Politics of Barbados
- List of Premiers/Prime Ministers of Barbados
