= West Indies Federation =

1958–1962 political union of British island colonies in the Caribbean

- 1958–1962
- Flag Coat of arms
- Motto: "To dwell together in unity"
- Anthem: "A Song for Federation" (proposed) Royal anthem: "God Save the Queen"
- Status: Self governing federation of colonies within the British Empire
- Capital: Chaguaramas (de jure); Port of Spain (de facto)
- Common languages: English; Patois; English Creoles; Spanish; French; Caribbean Hindustani; Chinese; Arabic; Antillean French Creoles; Tamil; Portuguese; Indigenous languages
- Demonym: West Indian
- Government: Federal parliamentary constitutional monarchy
- Monarch
  - 1958–1962: Elizabeth II
- Governor-General
  - 1958–1962: Lord Hailes
- Prime Minister
  - 1958–1962: Sir Grantley Herbert Adams
- Legislature: Federal Parliament
  - Upper Chamber: Senate
  - Lower Chamber: House of Representatives
- Historical era: Cold War
  - Established: 3 January 1958
  - Disestablished: 31 May 1962
- Currency: BWI dollar (XBWD)
- Calling code: +1 (809)
Preceded by
| British West Indies including: |
| Colony of Barbados |
| Colony of Jamaica |
| Colony of Trinidad and Tobago |
| British Leeward Islands |
| British Windward Islands |
Succeeded by
| CARIFTA including: |
| Antigua |
| Barbados |
| Cayman Islands |
| Dominica |
| Grenada |
| Jamaica |
| Montserrat |
| St Christopher-Nevis-Anguilla |
| Saint Lucia |
| St Vincent and the Grenadines |
| Trinidad and Tobago |
| Turks and Caicos Islands |
| West Indies Associated States |

The West Indies Federation, also known as the West Indies, the Federation of the West Indies the British West Indies Federation, or the West Indian Federation, was a short-lived political union that existed from 3 January 1958 to 31 May 1962. Various islands in the Caribbean that were part of the British Empire, including Trinidad and Tobago, Barbados, Jamaica, and those on the Leeward and Windward Islands, came together to form the Federation, with its capital to be in Chaguaramas, Trinidad and Tobago. The expressed intention of the Federation was to create a political unit that would become independent from Britain as a single state – possibly similar to Australia, Canada, or Rhodesia and Nyasaland. Before that could happen, the Federation collapsed due to internal political conflicts over how it would be governed or function viably following the results of the Jamaican political referendum on participation. The formation of a West Indian Federation was encouraged by the United Kingdom, but also requested by pan-Caribbean nationalists.

The territories that would have become part of the Federation eventually became the nine contemporary sovereign states of Antigua and Barbuda, Barbados, Dominica, Grenada, Jamaica, Saint Kitts and Nevis, Saint Lucia, Saint Vincent and the Grenadines, and Trinidad and Tobago; with Anguilla, Montserrat, the Cayman Islands, and the Turks and Caicos Islands becoming British overseas territories. British Guiana and British Honduras held observer status within the West Indies Federation.

== History ==
Several historically "West Indian" British colonies opted not to join the Federation for various reasons. The Bahamas and Bermuda believed that their future lay with association with North America. The British Virgin Islands decided against joining due to their close ties with the United States Virgin Islands and their fear that a federal West Indies government would be more stingy than the United Kingdom with subsidies to subjects that ran deficits. British Honduras considered itself too far from the rest of the federation (over 600 miles from Jamaica), and also thought that federation should be postponed until its territorial dispute with Guatemala was settled. British Guiana opted not to join the Federation due to fears of being forced to subsidise the other federal components and due to having more interest in South America than in the British Caribbean. East Indians in British Guiana also disliked the idea of joining a mostly-black federation when British Guiana was forecast to have an East Indian majority soon.

British Honduras and British Guiana did participate in the Federation to a certain extent as observers. The Bahamas participated in the 1960 West Indies Federation Games, with a future prime minister of the Bahamas, Perry Christie, as an athlete. Guyana would ultimately express interest in a very loose re-attempted Caribbean Federation around 1971.

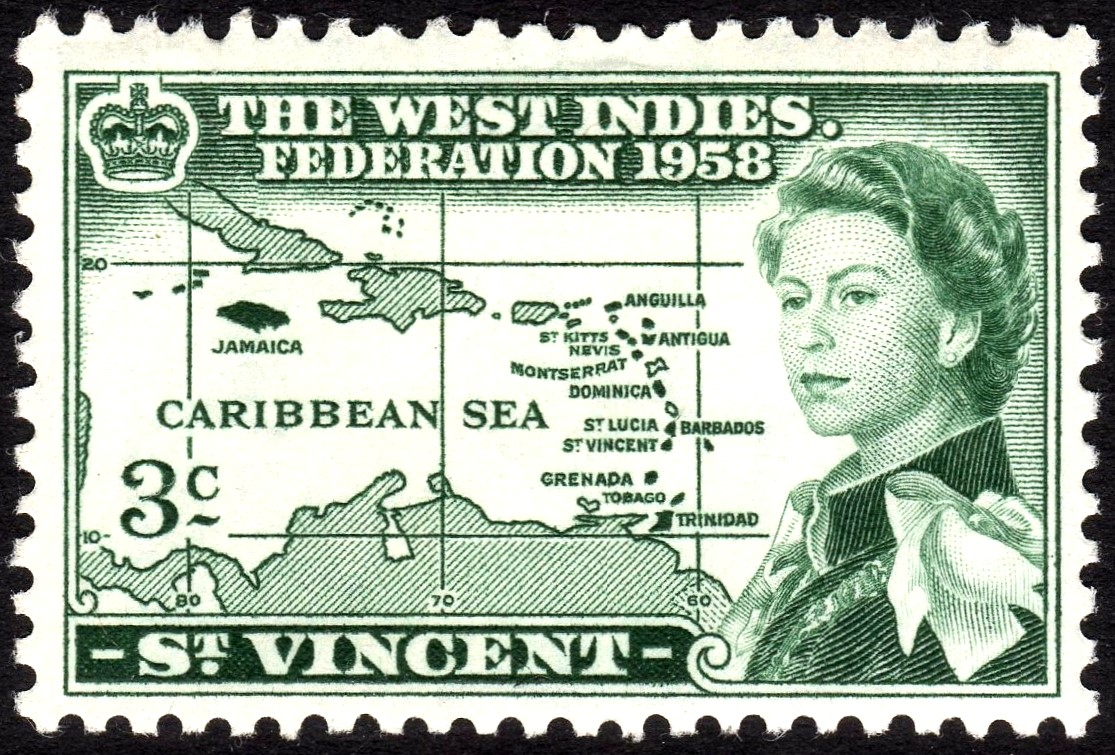
A 1958 St. Vincent stamp marking the establishment of the West Indies Federation

The Federation was an internally self-governing, federal state made up of ten provinces, all British colonial possessions. The federation was created by the United Kingdom in 1958 from most of the British West Indies. Britain intended that the Federation would shortly become a fully independent state, thus simultaneously satisfying the demands for independence from all the colonies in the region. However, significant political divisions among the former colonies persisted, and the Federation never achieved full sovereignty.

British Caribbean Federation Act 1956 (Note: Section 6.)
- Act of Parliament
- Parliament of the United Kingdom
- Long title: An Act to provide for the federation of certain West Indian colonies and for the transfer, to a court established for the purposes of the federation, of the jurisdiction of the Court of Appeal established by the West Indian Court of Appeal Act, 1919,[a] and the dissolution of that Court; to provide for conferring on the first-mentioned court jurisdiction to hear and determine appeals from the courts of colonies which are not for the time being included in the federation and to repeal the British Honduras (Court of Appeal) Act, 1881; and for purposes connected with the matters aforesaid.
- Citation: 4 & 5 Eliz. 2. c. 63
- Territorial extent: United Kingdom

Dates
- Royal assent: 2 August 1956
- Commencement: 2 August 1956 (Note: The Acts of Parliament (Commencement) Act 1793.)
- Repealed: 2 May 1986
Other legislation
| Repeals/revokes | British Honduras (Court of Appeal) Act 1881 |
| Repealed by | Statute Law (Repeals) Act 1986 |

Status: Repealed

Text of statute as originally enacted

The legal basis for the federation was the British Caribbean Federation Act 1956 (4 & 5 Eliz. 2. c. 63), and the date of formation – 3 January 1958 – was set by an Order in Council proclaimed in 1957.

=== Prior attempts at federation ===
The Federation of the West Indies was not the first attempt at a British Caribbean federation. The history of the previous attempts at federations and unions, in part, explains the failure of the 1958 Federation.

The initial federal attempts never went so far as to try to encompass all of the British West Indies (BWI), but were more regional in scope. The historical regional groupings included the British Leeward Islands, British Windward Islands and Jamaica with its nearby former dependencies. See: History of the British West Indies.

=== Dissolution ===
Many reasons have been put forward to explain the demise of the federation. These include the lack of local popular support, competing insular nationalism, the weakness of the federal government, prohibitions on federal taxation and freedom of movement, inadequacies in the Federal constitution, fundamental changes made to the constitution very early in its existence, political feuds between the influential leaders, the decision of the three most influential politicians not to contest Federal elections, friction between these leaders and the Federal government, the overwhelming concentration of population and resources in the two largest units, geographic and cultural distance between the units, the lack of a history of common administration, and the impact of the period of self-government that followed the promotion from the Crown Colony system.

However, the immediate catalyst for the dissolution of the Federation was Jamaican discontent. By 1961, there were a number of reasons for Jamaica's dissatisfaction with the state of affairs:

- Jamaica's share of the seats in the federal parliament was smaller than its share of the total population of the Federation.
- It was believed that the smaller islands would be a drain on Jamaica's wealth – the financial rewards of the island's bauxite were beginning to roll in.
- Jamaica was somewhat isolated in distance from the other islands.
- Inter-island rivalry.
- Many Jamaicans were upset that Kingston had not been chosen as the federal capital.

The most important reason for Jamaican dissatisfaction was the Federation's continuing colonial status. Jamaica had joined the Federation because its leaders had believed that the West Indies would quickly be granted independence. Nearly three years after the formation of the Federation, this had not occurred; meanwhile, smaller British colonies, like Cyprus and Sierra Leone, had gained independence. Thus, many Jamaicans believed that the island could and should seek independence in its own right.

There were also problems with the Federation's proposed capital in Chaguaramas on Trinidad, at that time still in the hands of the United States (having leased it as a naval base from the United Kingdom during World War II). Many of the Caribbean provincial leaders wanted Chaguaramas to be the Federation's capital. Provincial leaders, such as Norman Manley of Jamaica and Eric Williams, pushed for the handing over of Chaguaramas to the Federation from the US. However, the US and the UK disagreed and the Federation's Prime Minister, Sir Grantley Adams, stopped the provincial leaders from obtaining Chaguaramas. For many Jamaicans, it appeared that the Federation would then just hamper their development and movement towards independence.

As a result, the Bustamante-led Jamaica Labour Party (the local component of the West Indian DLP) successfully forced Manley to hold a referendum in September 1961 on political secession from the Federation. The result was 54% in favour of leaving the Federation, despite the opposition of Manley, the province's Chief Minister at the time. Manley himself lost the subsequent island elections in April 1962, and Bustamante became the first Prime Minister of an independent Jamaica on 6 August 1962.

After Jamaica left, there was an attempt to salvage a new federation from the wreckage of the old. Much depended on Premier Williams of Trinidad and Tobago, who had stated previously that he wanted a "strong federation". Premier Vere Bird of Antigua responded that his province would only be in a federation with Trinidad as an equal partner, not as "a little Tobago". He did indicate that a strong federation was acceptable provided that no attempt was made to create a unitary state.

Negotiations on this new federation began in September 1961; however, they indicated that Trinidad would have to provide 75 to 80 percent of the new Federation's revenue. Also, even though Trinidad would now represent 60 percent of the new Federation's population, the proposals under consideration would give it less than half of the seats in parliament.

By November, Williams indicated that he was now in favour of the idea of a unitary state. Failing that, he resolved to take Trinidad and Tobago into independence. In this, he was buoyed by his re-election as Trinidadian leader on 4 December 1961. Later that December, Premier Errol Barrow of Barbados met with Williams, but failed to persuade him to keep Trinidad in the Federation.

On 14 January 1962, the People's National Movement (the Williams-led Trinidad component of the WIFLP) passed a resolution rejecting any further involvement with the Federation. Williams himself stated that one from ten left nothing, not nine – in other words, without Jamaica, no Federation was possible. Trinidad and Tobago became independent on 31 August 1962.

Without Trinidad and Jamaica, the remaining "Little Eight" attempted to salvage some form of a West Indian Federation, this time centred on Barbados. However, these negotiations ultimately proved fruitless. Without its two largest states, the Federation was doomed to financial insolvency. Barbados now refused to shoulder the financial burden. Antigua and Grenada began toying with the idea of merging with Jamaica and Trinidad, respectively.

== Geography ==
The Federation spanned all the island groupings in the Caribbean:

- The Lucayan Archipelago:
  - Turks and Caicos Islands
- The Greater Antilles:
  - Jamaica
  - Cayman Islands (Grand Cayman, Cayman Brac and Little Cayman)
- The Lesser Antilles:
  - Barbados, east of the Windward Islands
  - Leeward Islands:
    - Antigua
    - Barbuda
    - Redonda
    - Saint Christopher
    - Nevis
    - Anguilla
    - Montserrat
  - Windward Islands:
    - Dominica
    - Saint Lucia
    - Saint Vincent
    - Grenadines
    - Grenada
  - Trinidad
  - Tobago

At its widest (west to east), from the Cayman Islands to Barbados it spanned some 2,425 kilometres (1,310 nmi) (and across approximately 22 degrees of longitude) and from the Turks and Caicos Islands in the north, to the Icacos Point, Trinidad in the south it extended 1,700 kilometres (920 nmi) (and across 12 degrees of latitude). However, most of the area along either of these distances was taken up by open water (with the exception of some of the other islands lying in between). By comparison Great Britain stretches across nearly 10 degrees of latitude and Spain extends across almost 20 degrees of longitude. Even though the West Indies was spread across such a vast area, most of its provinces were mostly contiguous and clustered fairly close together in the Eastern Caribbean, with the obvious exceptions of Jamaica, the Cayman Islands, and Turks and Caicos Islands.

Most of the islands have mountainous interiors surrounded by narrow coastal plains. The exceptions were Anguilla, Antigua, Barbados, Barbuda, the Cayman Islands, the Turks and Caicos Islands (which are all fairly flat), and Trinidad (which has a large mountain range in the north and a small central mountain range in the interior of the otherwise flat island). The narrow coastal plains as well as historical trade is the main reason why almost all of the major settlements (cities and towns) of the Federation were located on the coast. Chief towns included Kingston, Port of Spain, Chaguaramas, Bridgetown, Spanish Town, Montego Bay, San Fernando, Mandeville, Castries, Roseau, St. George's, Kingstown, St. John's, and Basseterre.

The climate in all the islands is tropical, with hot and humid weather, although inland regions in the larger islands have more temperate climates. Regions falling within the rain shadows (southern coasts of Jamaica and Trinidad and eastern coasts of the Lesser Antilles) are relatively drier. There are two seasons annually: the dry season for the first six months of the year, and the rainy season (also known as the hurricane season) in the second half of the year. Many of the islands fall within the Main Development Region for tropical cyclone activity, with the exception of Trinidad (although it occasionally experiences low latitude hurricanes) and thus are at risk from potential wind and flood damage.

Britain classified the Federation as being part of its "Caribbean and North Atlantic Territories" region which was shared alongside other possessions such as Bermuda.

The Federation today is geographically considered to be part of the North American continent as all of its islands are in and around the Caribbean, even though Trinidad is located just offshore from South America and lies on the same continental shelf. See Transcontinental countries.

=== Provinces ===
Map of the provinces of the West Indies Federation

Provinces and Territories of the West Indies
| Flag | Province | Capital | Population | Area (km^{2}) |
|---|---|---|---|---|
| Antigua and Barbuda | Antigua | St. John's | 57,000 | 440 |
| | Barbados | Bridgetown | 234,000 | 431 |
| | Cayman Islands (attached to Jamaica) | George Town | 9,000 | 264 |
| Dominica 1955-1965 | Dominica | Roseau | 61,000 | 750 |
| | Grenada | St. George's | 91,000 | 344 |
| | Jamaica | Kingston | 1,660,000 | 10,991 |
| | Montserrat | Plymouth | 13,000 | 102 |
| St. Christopher-Nevis-Anguilla | Saint Christopher-Nevis-Anguilla | Basseterre | 55,600 | 351 |
| | Saint Lucia | Castries | 95,000 | 616 |
| | Saint Vincent and the Grenadines | Kingstown | 83,000 | 389 |
| | Trinidad and Tobago | Port of Spain | 900,000 | 5,131 |
| | Turks and Caicos Islands (attached to Jamaica) | Cockburn Town | 6,000 | 430 |
| West Indies Federation | Federation of the West Indies | Chaguaramas (de jure) | 3,264,600 | 20,239 km^{2} |

== Demographics ==
The total population of the West Indies Federation was between 3 and 4 million people, with the majority being of black West African descent. Minorities included Indians from the Indian subcontinent (called East Indians), Europeans, Chinese, Arabs, and Caribs. There was also a large population of mixed descent (mainly mulattos, but also Afro-Indian, Euro-Indian and mixed-Chinese). In terms of religion, most of the population was Protestant, with significant numbers of Catholics and some Hindus and Muslims (both almost exclusively from the East Indian population).

The West Indies Federation (or just West Indies) consisted of around 24 main inhabited islands and approximately 220–230 minor offshore islands, islets and cays (some inhabited, some uninhabited). The largest island was Jamaica, located in the far northwest of the Federation. To the southeast lay the second largest island, Trinidad, followed by Barbados (in terms of population), located at the eastern extremity of the Federation.

== Politics ==
As with all British colonies of the period, Queen Elizabeth II was the head of state, and The Crown was vested with the legislative authority for matters concerning executive affairs, defence and the financing of the Federation. Her representative, The 1st Baron Hailes, was given the title of Governor-General, synonymous with a self-governing colony, rather than that of Governor more typical for a British Crown colony system of government. The title may have reflected the federal nature of the state, or indicated the expectations that the Federation would soon become self-governing or independent. The Governor-General also had the full authority of the British Government to veto any laws passed by the Federation.

The Federal Parliament of the West Indies Federation was bicameral, consisting of a nominated Senate and a popularly elected House of Representatives. The Senate consisted of nineteen members. These members were appointed by the Governor-General, after consulting the respective territorial governments. Two members represented each unit (with only one from Montserrat). The House of Representatives had 45 total elected members – Jamaica had seventeen seats, Trinidad and Tobago ten seats, Barbados five seats, Montserrat one seat, and the remaining islands two seats each.

However, the government (executive) would be a Council of State, not a Cabinet. It would be presided over by the Governor-General and consist of the Prime Minister and ten other officials.

The West Indies Federation did not have independent sources of revenue (relying instead on a mandatory levy on the islands), and did not establish any agreements on a customs union, free trade, or free movement.

The politics of the embryonic Federation were wrecked by struggles between the federal government and the provincial governments, and even power sharing between the two largest provinces (Jamaica and Trinidad and Tobago) and the smaller provinces.

The West Indies Federation had an unusually weak federal structure. For instance, its provinces were not contained in a single customs union. Thus, each province functioned as a separate economy, complete with tariffs, largely because the smaller provinces were afraid of being overwhelmed by the large islands' economies. Also, complete freedom of movement within the Federation was not implemented, as the larger provinces were worried about mass migration from the smaller islands.

Jamaica, the largest member of the West Indies Federation, opposed plans to establish a customs union and to increase the ability of the federal government to levy taxes.

Adom Getachew writes that relations between minority groups, such as the descendants of East Indians (which were a large share of the populations of Trinidad and Tobago and British Guiana), and the majority population of Afro-West Indians were a source of tension in the West Indies Federation. For example, British Guiana rejected the West Indies Federation in part because it lacked sufficient protections for ethnic minorities.

There were tensions between those who wanted a strong federal state (capable of undertaking major economic development projects and redistribution) and those who wanted a federal structure that gave each member substantial autonomy. Eric Williams was a strong advocate for a strong federal state. Critics in Jamaica were opposed to any redistributive schemes that would primarily lead to Jamaica providing grants to the smaller islands. There were also some concerns about unequal development and its impact on areas with less competitive industries which wanted protectionist measures within the federation.

In addition, the federal government could not take its component states to task. The initial federal budget was quite small, limiting the federal government's ability to use its financial largess as a carrot. It was dependent upon grants from the United Kingdom and from its member states. The provincial budgets of Jamaica and Trinidad and Tobago were both larger than the federal budget. This led to repeated requests for those states to provide greater financing to the federal government. These requests were not well received, as Jamaica and Trinidad and Tobago together already contributed 85 percent of the federal revenue, in roughly equal portions.

Furthermore, the office of the Prime Minister was a weak one. Unlike other Westminster systems with Prime Ministers, the West Indian Federation's PM could not dissolve Parliament.

=== Capital site: Proposed and de facto capital ===
Three member states were proposed as hosts for the capital city of the federation: Jamaica, Barbados and Trinidad and Tobago. Earlier in the federal negotiations the general opinion had been that the capital should be one of the smaller islands so that the capital would be in a neutral position to the larger territories and it would be able to inject some buoyancy into one of the (then) poorer economies. To this end, Grenada was tentatively selected as the member state to host the capital but this was abandoned after protests from some of the parties involved, and at the London Conference the smaller islands were ruled out for consideration. Within Trinidad and Tobago the first proposed site was Chaguaramas, a few miles west of Port of Spain, but the site was part of a United States naval base. In practice, Port of Spain served as the de facto federal capital for the duration of the federation's existence.

=== Governance ===
The Federation also had a number of units deemed to be common services for the entire federation, these were:

- The Federal Shipping Service
- The Federal Supreme Court
- The University College of the West Indies
- The West Indies Meteorological Service
- West India Regiment

=== Elections ===
Map of the results of the 1958 Federal election. The WIFLP won the most seats in islands/island groups coloured orange, whilst the DLP won the most seats in islands/island groups coloured blue. The Cayman Islands & Turks and Caicos Islands were included as part of Jamaica.

In preparation for the first federal elections, two Federation-wide parties were organised as confederations of local political parties. Both were organised by Jamaican politicians: the West Indies Federal Labour Party by Norman Manley, and the Democratic Labour Party by Alexander Bustamante. In broad terms, the WIFLP consisted of the urban-based parties throughout the Federation, while the DLP consisted of the rural-based parties. A small third party, the Federal Democratic Party, was founded in November 1957 by a group of Trinidadians, although it did not win any seats.

The platforms for the two major national parties were similar in many respects. Both advocated maintaining and strengthening ties with the United Kingdom, United States, and Canada (countries with which the islands had strong cultural and economic links); encouraging and expanding tourism; working to bring British Guiana and British Honduras into the Federation and to obtain loans, financial aid, and technical assistance. Despite these similarities, there were differences. The WIFLP had advocated the encouragement of agriculture while the DLP had promised a climate favourable to both private industry and labour, development of human and economic resources. The WIFLP promised to encourage the Bahamas (in addition to British Guiana and British Honduras) to join the Federation, whereas the DLP did not. The WIFLP also campaigned to establish a central bank for the extension of credit resources and advocated a democratic socialist society and full internal self-government for all the unit territories, whilst avoiding the issues of freedom of movement and a customs union. The DLP said nothing about full internal self-government, attacked socialism, wished to avoid high taxation (via loans and technical aid) and emphasized West Indian unity, freedom of worship and speech, and encouragement of trade unions.

Federal elections were held on 25 March 1958. The WIFLP won the election, winning 26 seats while the DLP carried 19 seats. The bulk of the WIFLP seats came from the smaller islands while the DLP carried the majority in Jamaica and Trinidad & Tobago. The DLP won 11 of the Jamaican seats and 6 of the Trinidadian seats. In appointing the Senate, Governor-General Lord Hailes realized that only the St Vincent island government was DLP controlled and as a result the Senate was going to be disproportionately pro WIFLP. In a controversial decision, he contacted the opposition DLP groups in Jamaica and Trinidad, and appointed one DLP senator from each of those islands. Thus the Senate consisted of a total of 15 WIFLP members and 4 DLP members.

The WIFLP leader, Sir Grantley Adams of Barbados, became Prime Minister. The selection of Adams as the Prime Minister was indicative of the problems the Federation would face. The expected leader of the WIFLP was Norman Manley, Premier of Jamaica, and the next logical choice was Dr Eric Williams, Premier of Trinidad and Tobago. However, neither had contested the Federal elections, preferring to remain in control of their respective island power bases. This suggested that the leaders of the two most important provinces did not see the Federation as viable. Similarly, Alexander Bustamante, the Jamaican founder of the DLP, also declined to contest the Federal election, leaving the party leadership to the Trinidadian Ashford Sinanan. The absence of the leading Jamaican politicians from any role at the federal level was to undermine the Federation's unity.

Other members of the Council of State included:

- Deputy Prime Minister and Minister of Trade and Industry: Carl La Corbiniere (St Lucia)
- Minister of Finance: Robert Llewellyn Bradshaw (St Kitts)
- Minister of Communications and Works: Wilfred Andrew Rose (Trinidad and Tobago)
- Minister of Natural Resources and Agriculture: Frank Ricketts (Jamaica)
- Minister of Labour and Social Affairs: Phyllis Byam Shand Allfrey (Dominica)
- Ministers without Portfolio: Novelle Richards (Antigua), Victor Vaughn (Barbados), Allan Byfield (Jamaica), James Liburd (St Kitts), and James Luc Charles (St Lucia)

== Judiciary ==
=== Federal Supreme Court ===
There was also a Federal Supreme Court consisting of a Chief Justice and three (later five) other Justices. The Federal Supreme Court itself was the successor to the West Indian Court of Appeal (established in 1919) and had jurisdiction over the same territories (Barbados, British Guiana, the Leeward Islands (including the British Virgin Islands), Trinidad & Tobago and the Windward Islands) in addition to Jamaica and its dependencies, except for British Honduras, as the British Caribbean Federation Act 1956, which empowered the Privy Council to establish it, also repealed the enactment which allowed for appeals from the British Honduras Supreme Court to the Privy Council or the Supreme Court of Jamaica, namely the British Honduras (Court of Appeal) Act 1881. (The arrangement for appeals to the Supreme Court of Jamaica had generally ceased in 1911 anyway.)

Sir Stanley Eugene Gomes, Chief Justice of Trinidad and Tobago, was appointed Chief Justice of the Federation in August 1961.

== Relationship with Canada ==
The Federation maintained a particularly close relationship with Canada, which had a similar past as a federation of several former separate British colonies. In the early years, several Caribbean leaders suggested that the West Indies Federation should investigate the possibility of becoming a Canadian province.

Despite the breakdown in talks, in May 1961, the Canadian Government presented the West Indies Federation with two of the region's most important gifts: two merchant ships, named The Federal Palm and The Federal Maple. These two vessels visited every island in the federation twice monthly, providing a crucial sea-link between the islands.

== Symbols ==
=== Music ===
During that period, many calypsos made reference to the Federation of the West Indies, first expressing hope, then frustration as the process collapsed.

=== Philatelic collections / postal stamps ===
During the Federation's existence, each member continued to issue its own postage stamps as before; but on 22 April 1958, each of the members (except for the Cayman Islands) issued a set of three commemorative stamps. All of these stamps used a common design depicting a map of the Caribbean and a portrait of Queen Elizabeth II, with an inscription reading "THE WEST INDIES / FEDERATION 1958" at the top and the name of the member state at the bottom. These stamps are quite common in both mint and used condition.

== Legacy ==
The federation's currency was the West Indies dollar (though Jamaica continued to use the pound), which was later succeeded by the East Caribbean dollar, the Barbadian dollar, and the Trinidad and Tobago dollar. Successor organisations included the West Indies Associated States and CARICOM.

The Federal Supreme Court would also be succeed by a British Caribbean Court of Appeal (1962–1966) and then a West Indies Associated States Supreme Court (Court of Appeal and High Court) (1967–1980) and ultimately by an Eastern Caribbean Court of Appeal and Eastern Caribbean Supreme Court in 1981 for the OECS. More recently a Caribbean Court of Justice has been established which would also fulfil the role of the original Supreme Court if all CSME members accede to the court's appellate jurisdiction (currently Barbados, Belize and Guyana do so).

Some see the West Indies cricket team as a legacy of the Federation, although the side was actually organised thirty years prior to the birth of the federation.

Another lasting regional fixture, officially created before the Federation, is the University of the West Indies. During the Federation, the university pursued a policy of regional expansion beyond the main Jamaica campus. Two other campuses were established: one in Trinidad and Tobago, established in 1960, and one in Barbados, established a short time after the Federation dissolved in 1963. Since 2004, the West Indies Federal Archives Centre has been located on the university's Cave Hill campus in Barbados.

=== UK/West Indies Associated States (WIAS) ===
West Indies Act 1962 (Note: Section 10(1).)
- Act of Parliament
- Parliament of the United Kingdom
- Long title: An Act to enable provision to be made for the cesser of the inclusion of colonies in the federation established under the British Caribbean Federation Act, 1956, and for the dissolution of that federation and for matters consequential on the happening of either of those events; to enable provision to be made for the establishment of common courts and other authorities for, and fresh provision to be made for the government of, certain West Indian colonies; to enable provision to be made for the establishment of new forms of government for combinations of such colonies; and for purposes connected with the matters aforesaid.
- Citation: 10 & 11 Eliz. 2. c. 19
- Territorial extent: United Kingdom

Dates
- Royal assent: 18 April 1962
- Commencement: 18 April 1962 (Note: The Acts of Parliament (Commencement) Act 1793.)
Other legislation
| Amends | Leeward Islands Act 1956 |
| Repeals/revokes | Jamaica Act 1866; Saint Vincent and Grenada Constitution Act 1876; Trinidad and Tobago Act 1887; West Indian Court of Appeal Act 1919; Dominica Act 1938; Cayman Islands and Turks and Caicos Islands Act 1958 |
| Amended by | Jamaica Independence Act 1962; Statute Law (Repeals) Act 1974; Statute Law (Repeals) Act 1989 |
| Relates to | British Caribbean Federation Act 1956; Jamaica Independence Act 1962; Trinidad and Tobago Independence Act 1962; Barbados Independence Act 1966 |

Status: Amended

Text of statute as originally enacted

Text of the West Indies Act 1962 as in force today (including any amendments) within the United Kingdom, from legislation.gov.uk.

The West Indies Federation was legally dissolved with the Parliament of the United Kingdom's West Indies Act 1962 (10 & 11 Eliz. 2. c. 19). The remaining "Little Eight" provinces once again became separate colonies supervised directly from London, most of which became independent later on, as follows:

- Barbados – 1966
- Grenada – 1974
- Dominica – 1978
- Saint Lucia – 1979
- St Vincent and the Grenadines – 1979
- Antigua and Barbuda – 1981
- Saint Kitts and Nevis – 1983

The Cayman Islands and Turks and Caicos Islands had been separated from Jamaica upon the latter's independence in 1962; Anguilla was separated from Saint Kitts and Nevis in 1980. Along with Montserrat, all three remain British Overseas Territories.

== See also ==
- Governor-General of the West Indies Federation
- Prime Minister of the West Indies Federation
- Antigua and Barbuda under the West Indies Federation
- History of the Caribbean
- Canada-Caribbean relations
- CARICOM
- Cricket in the West Indies
- Netherlands Antilles federation
- Federation of Rhodesia and Nyasaland – another contemporaneous attempt at federation
- East African Federation – a current attempt at federation
- Dissolution of the Netherlands Antilles (2010)
