= Toxteth by-election =

Toxteth by-election may refer to:

- 1895 Liverpool East Toxteth by-election
- 1902 Liverpool East Toxteth by-election
- 1916 Liverpool East Toxteth by-election
- 1929 Liverpool East Toxteth by-election
- 1931 Liverpool East Toxteth by-election
- 1935 Liverpool West Toxteth by-election

See also

- Liverpool East Toxteth (UK Parliament constituency)
- Liverpool West Toxteth (UK Parliament constituency)
- Liverpool Toxteth (UK Parliament constituency)
