= 1916 Liverpool East Toxteth by-election =

UK parliamentary by-election

The 1916 Liverpool East Toxteth by-election was a parliamentary by-election held in England on 21 February 1916 for the British House of Commons constituency of Liverpool East Toxteth.

== Vacancy ==
The by-election was caused by the appointment of the Conservative Member of Parliament (MP), Edward Marshall Hall as the Recorder of Guildford. The Recorder's role as a part-time judge disqualified him from sitting in Parliament, and his acceptance of the post automatically caused a vacancy, and Hall accepted the appointment after checking with the Liverpool Conservatives that a by-election would not be problematic for them.

The writ of election for the by-election was moved in the Commons on 10 February by William Bridgeman, the MP for Oswestry.

== Candidates ==
The Conservatives had already selected Captain James Stuart Rankin as their prospective candidate for the next general election.

The 36-year-old Rankin, who was then serving in Liverpool with the Royal Field Artillery, was formally adopted on 14 February as the Conservative candidate for the by-election. During World War I, the major political parties had agreed not to contest by-elections when seats held by their respective parties fell vacant, and the Toxteth Liberals accepted Rankin's nomination. They did not nominate a candidate of their own.

Since Rankin was the only candidate, he was returned unopposed.

== Aftermath ==
At the next general election, in 1918, Rankin was re-elected unopposed as a Coalition Conservative. He held the seat until he stood down at the 1924 general election,

== See also ==
- Liverpool East Toxteth constituency
- Toxteth
- 1895 Liverpool East Toxteth by-election
- 1902 Liverpool East Toxteth by-election
- 1929 Liverpool East Toxteth by-election
- 1931 Liverpool East Toxteth by-election
- List of United Kingdom by-elections (1900–1918)
