= Lyon Blease =

Lyon Blease

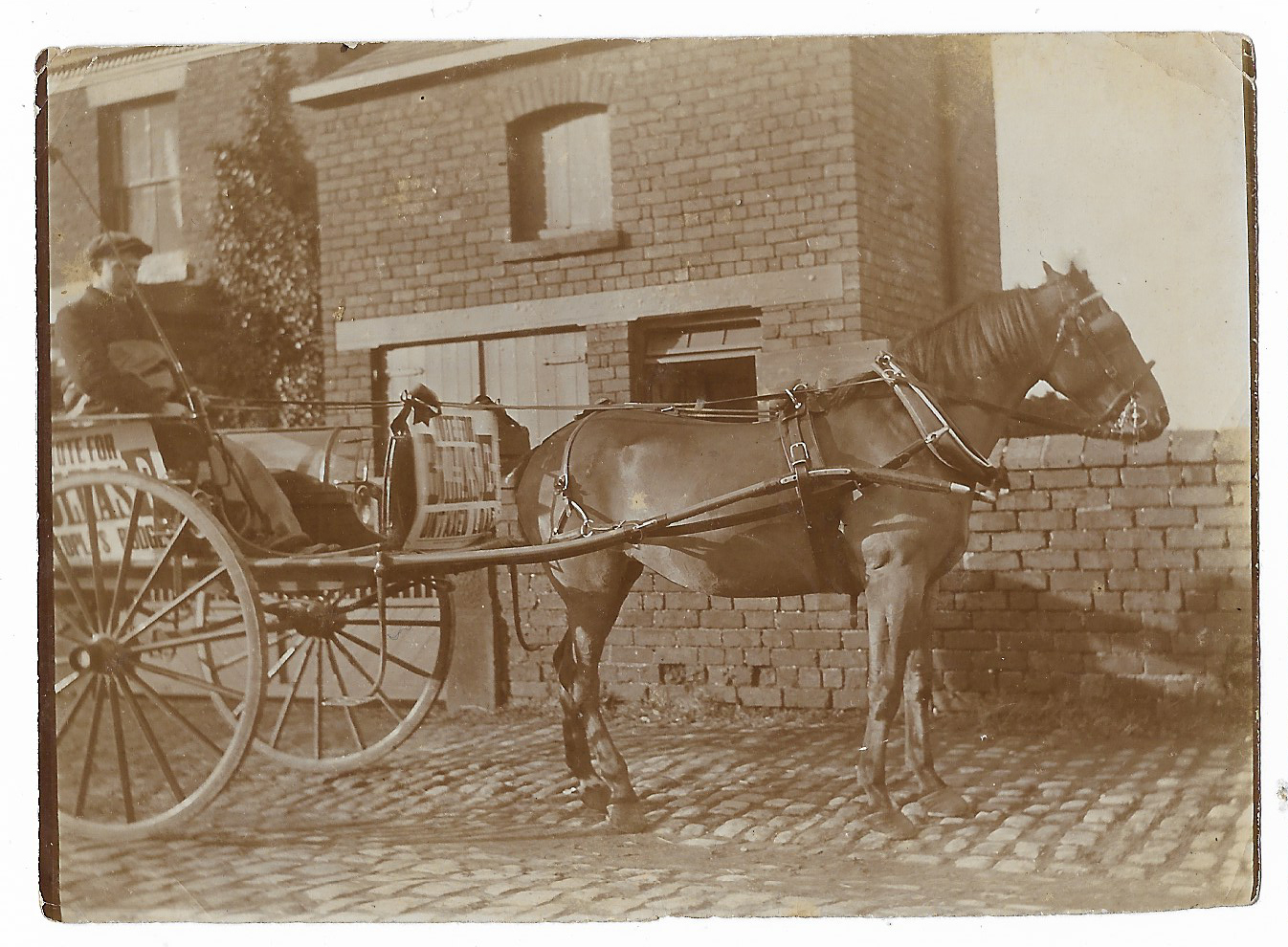
Horse and trap bearing "Vote for Blease" signs during the 1910 general election campaign for Chorley, Lancashire

Prof. Walter Lyon Blease (1884 – 12 April 1963), was a British Liberal Party politician, barrister and academic.

== Background ==
He was born in Liverpool, the son of Walter and Mary Cecilia Blease. He was educated at Parkfield School, Liverpool; Shrewsbury School and Liverpool University. He was awarded the Studentship at Bar Final Examination, 1906. He married, in 1918, Harriott Davies. They had three daughters.

He served with hospital units in Serbia 1915 and in Russia and Romania 1916–18. He was Assistant Editor of The New East, Tokyo in 1918.

== Academic career ==
He was Lecturer in the Law and Custom of the Constitution at Liverpool University in 1910. He was Queen Victoria Professor of Law, at Liverpool University from 1919–49.

== Political career ==
He was Liberal candidate for the Chorley Division of Lancashire at the January 1910 General Election.

General Election January 1910 Electorate 14,347
Party	Candidate	Votes	%	±%
Conservative	Lord Balcarres	7,735	58.3	
Liberal	Walter Lyon Blease	5,523	41.7	
Majority		2,212	16.6	
Turnout		13,258	92.4	
Conservative hold		Swing		

In 1936 he was appointed a governor of the British Film Institute. In 1939 he was adopted as Liberal prospective parliamentary candidate for the East Toxteth Division of Liverpool. The constituency had been safe for the Conservatives during the 1930s, even without a Labour candidate to split the anti-Tory vote. By 1939 there was again no Labour candidate selected. A general election was anticipated to take place in the autumn of 1939, but, due to the outbreak of war, the election did not take place until the 1945 general election. By then, a Labour candidate had emerged;

General Election 1945 Electorate 52,484
Party	Candidate	Votes	%	±%
Conservative	Patrick George Thomas Buchan-Hepburn	18,145	49.3	−10.9
Labour	Lt. Victor Harold Edgar Baker	12,376	33.6	n/a
Liberal	Prof. Walter Lyon Blease	6,286	17.1	−22.7
Majority		5,769	15.7	−4.7
Turnout		36,807	70.1	+4.9
Conservative hold		Swing	n/a	

He was Liberal candidate for the new Garston Division of Liverpool at the 1950 General Election.

General Election 1950 Electorate 65,001
Party	Candidate	Votes	%	±%
Conservative	Henry Victor Alpin MacKinnon Raikes	31,750	57.6	N/A
Labour	Edgar Hewitt	17,477	31.6	N/A
Liberal	Prof. Walter Lyon Blease	5,966	10.8	N/A
Majority		14,303	25.9	N/A
Turnout		55,163	84.9	N/A
Conservative win (new seat)				

He was Chairman of the Executive Council for Liverpool under the National Health Service Act 1946 from 1952–60. He was a Member of the Management Committee of the Executive Councils Association (England) from 1960 until his death.

He was Chairman of the Liverpool Philharmonic Society from 1950–51.

== See also ==
Works by or about Lyon Blease at Wikisource
