= Buchan-Hepburn baronets =

Baronetcy in the Baronetage of the United Kingdom

The Buchan-Hepburn Baronetcy, of Smeaton-Hepburn in the County of Haddington, is a title in the Baronetage of the United Kingdom. It was created on 6 May 1815 for George Buchan-Hepburn, a Judge of the Admiralty Court from 1790 to 1791 and a Baron of the Exchequer for Scotland from 1791 to 1814. Born George Buchan, he assumed the additional surname of Hepburn by Royal licence in 1764, which was that of his maternal grandfather. His grandson, the third Baronet (who succeeded his father), represented Haddington in the House of Commons from 1838 to 1847. The fourth Baronet, his son, was a deputy lieutenant of Haddingtonshire. On the death of the sixth Baronet, the grandson of the fourth Baronet, in 1992, the line of the eldest son of the second Baronet failed. The late Baronet, stepfather of Duchess of Northumberland, was succeeded by his third cousin, the seventh holder of the title. He was succeeded by his grandson in 2022. The family surname is pronounced "Bukkan-Hebburn".

Patrick Buchan-Hepburn, 1st Baron Hailes, was a younger son of the fourth Baronet.

== Buchan-Hepburn baronets, of Smeaton-Hepburn (1815) ==
Escutcheon of the Buchan-Hepburn baronets of Smeaton-Hepburn

- Sir George Buchan-Hepburn, 1st Baronet (1739–1819)
- Sir John Buchan-Hepburn, 2nd Baronet (1776–1833)
- Sir Thomas Buchan-Hepburn, 3rd Baronet (1804–1893)
- Sir Archibald Buchan-Hepburn, 4th Baronet (1852–1929)
- Sir John Karslake Thomas Buchan-Hepburn, 5th Baronet (1894–1961)
- Sir Ninian Buchan Archibald John Buchan-Hepburn, 6th Baronet (1922–1992)
- Sir John Alastair Trant Kidd Buchan-Hepburn, 7th Baronet (1931–2022)
- Sir John James Christopher Thomas Buchan-Hepburn, 8th Baronet (b. 1992)

The heir presumptive is Henry Robert Buchan-Hepburn (born 1997), younger brother of the present holder, and there are no further heirs to the title.

== Notes ==
Peerage of the United Kingdom
Preceded by Leigh baronets	Buchan-Hepburn baronets of Smeaton-Hepburn; 6 May 1815	Succeeded by Dalrymple baronets
