= 1929 Liverpool East Toxteth by-election =

UK parliamentary by-election

The 1929 Liverpool East Toxteth by-election was a parliamentary by-election for the British House of Commons constituency of Liverpool East Toxteth on 19 March 1929.

== Vacancy ==
The by-election was caused by the death of the sitting Unionist MP, Albert Edward Jacob on 26 February 1929, aged 71. He had been MP here since holding the seat in 1924.

== Election history ==
East Toxteth was a safe Unionist seat that they had not lost since the seat was created in 1885. One former Unionist MP had crossed the floor to join the Liberals in 1906 due to his support for Free Trade, but he did not attempt to defend the seat under his new party colours. Since the war, the most successful non Unionist candidate was the Independent Eleanor Rathbone, who had polled nearly 40% in a two-horse race at the 1922 general election. The result at the last General election was

1924 general election Electorate 35,238
Party	Candidate	Votes	%	±%
Unionist	Albert Jacob	16,139	59.9	N/A
Labour	Charles Burden	6,620	24.6	New
Liberal	Frederick Charles Bowring	4,163	15.5	New
Majority		9,519	35.3	N/A
Turnout		26,922	76.4	N/A
Unionist hold		Swing	N/A	

== Candidates ==
- 31-year-old Hon. Henry Mond was the Unionist candidate. He was born in London and educated at Winchester College. He was the son of Baron Melchett, a former Liberal MP who had joined the Unionists in 1926. From 1915 Henry Mond served in World War I with the South Wales Borderers but was wounded in 1916. He then joined some of his father's businesses, becoming a director of Brunner, Mond and Co. He had also been a Liberal MP, having sat for the Isle of Ely from 1923-24 when he was defeated, standing as a Liberal.
- 27-year-old Joseph Cleary was the Labour candidate. He was born in the West Derby district of Liverpool and educated at Skerry's College, Liverpool. He was General Secretary of the Warehouse Workers Union. He had been the Labour Councillor for the Croxteth ward of Liverpool City Council since 1925. He was appointed a Liverpool Justice of the Peace in 1927. He was contesting a parliamentary seat for the first time.
- 40-year-old Aled Roberts was the Liberal candidate. Roberts was born in Liverpool and educated at Liverpool College. During the First World War, he served in the army and achieved the rank of captain in the Royal Welch Fusiliers in 1915 and served abroad from 1916 to 1919. He was an insurance broker in his own firm, Aled O Roberts & Co. and an underwriter. He was the Hon. Treasurer of the Royal National Eisteddfod of Wales. He was contesting a parliamentary seat for the first time.

== Campaign ==
Polling Day was fixed for 19 March 1929, a snap election, just 21 days after the death of the previous MP.

In his book 'Democracy and Sectarianism: A Political and Social History of Liverpool 1868-1939', Philip J. Waller described the campaign, firstly by outlining the Unionist candidate, Henry Mond's views;

Men must resist Liberalism's 'demonstrated futility' and Socialism's 'demonstrated dangers'. In an economic emergency, to avoid a general reduction of wages he favoured a tariff on foreign manufactured goods and 'a policy of Imperial insulation'; but mostly he appealed to governments to observe different priorities. Two forces were responsible for Britain's economic decline, the 'orthodox Free Trade View' and the 'orthodox Treasury View'. Industrial interests should be put before financial interests, and Mond advocated an extension of credit to rationalized industries by squeezing the unrationalized. The whole taxation system, in his opinion, was wrong: if taxation was used to redistribute wealth industrial progress would be halted by the injury to capital and effort. 'What you want to arrive at', Mond thought, 'is not national redistribution, but national prosperity, with high wages, and in order to get high wages you have got to have good prices and low taxes'.

Undaunted, the Liberal candidate Aled Roberts, echoed David Lloyd George's boast that he could reduce unemployment to normal proportions within twelve months; and Labour's candidate, Cleary, hardly seemed the dangerous man of Mond's imagination. He deprecated 'scare statements' regarding Labour's financial intentions, and advocated raising the school-leaving age, adequate pensions, an international forty-eight hours week, the scientific utilization of land, a unified coal industry, public works, and trade expansion. Altogether the by-election had an ailing look, personified by Lord Birkenhead's last appearance at the hustings.

== Result ==
The Unionists held the seat for the first time polling less than 50% of the vote. Mond returned to parliament to represent a new constituency for his new party. Cleary was still able to increase the Labour vote share, but the most striking feature of the result was the advance in the Liberal vote from third place.

Liverpool East Toxteth by-election, 1929 Electorate 36,388
Party	Candidate	Votes	%	±%
Unionist	Henry Mond	9,462	43.2	−16.7
Labour	Joseph Cleary	6,563	29.2	+4.6
Liberal	Aled Roberts	6,206	27.6	+12.1
Majority		3,129	14.0	−19.3
Turnout		22,231	61.7	−14.7
Unionist hold		Swing	-10.7	

== Aftermath ==
Mond was re-elected here at the following General Election but when his father died in 1930 he inherited his seat in the House of Lords. Cleary also stood here again at the General Election in 1929 but made no further impression. However he was elected for Labour at the 1935 Liverpool Wavertree by-election. Although Roberts stood here again in 1929, for the 1931 general election, he was elected for the Liberals at Wrexham. The result at the following General election;

1929 general election Electorate 48,812
Party	Candidate	Votes	%	±%
Unionist	Henry Mond	17,678	47.9	+4.7
Labour	Joseph Cleary	9,904	26.9	−2.3
Liberal	Aled Roberts	9,287	25.2	−2.4
Majority		7,774	21.0	+7.0
Turnout		36,869	75.5	+13.8
Unionist hold		Swing	+4.5	

== See also ==
- United Kingdom by-election records
- Liverpool East Toxteth constituency
- Toxteth
- 1895 Liverpool East Toxteth by-election
- 1902 Liverpool East Toxteth by-election
- 1916 Liverpool East Toxteth by-election
- 1931 Liverpool East Toxteth by-election
- List of United Kingdom by-elections (1918–1931)
