= Marjoribanks baronets of Lees (1815) =

Escutcheon of the Marjoribanks baronets of Lees

The Marjoribanks baronetcy, of Lees in the County of Berwick, was created in the Baronetage of the United Kingdom on 6 May 1815 for John Marjoribanks, Member of Parliament for Buteshire and Berwickshire and Lord Provost of Edinburgh. The title became extinct on the death of the fourth Baronet in 1888. The first Baronet's fourth son was David Robertson, 1st Baron Marjoribanks.

== Marjoribanks baronets, of Lees (1815) ==
- Sir John Marjoribanks, 1st Baronet (1763–1833)
- Sir William Marjoribanks, 2nd Baronet (1792–1834)
- Sir John Marjoribanks, 3rd Baronet (1830–1884)
- Sir William Marjoribanks, 4th Baronet (1832–1888)

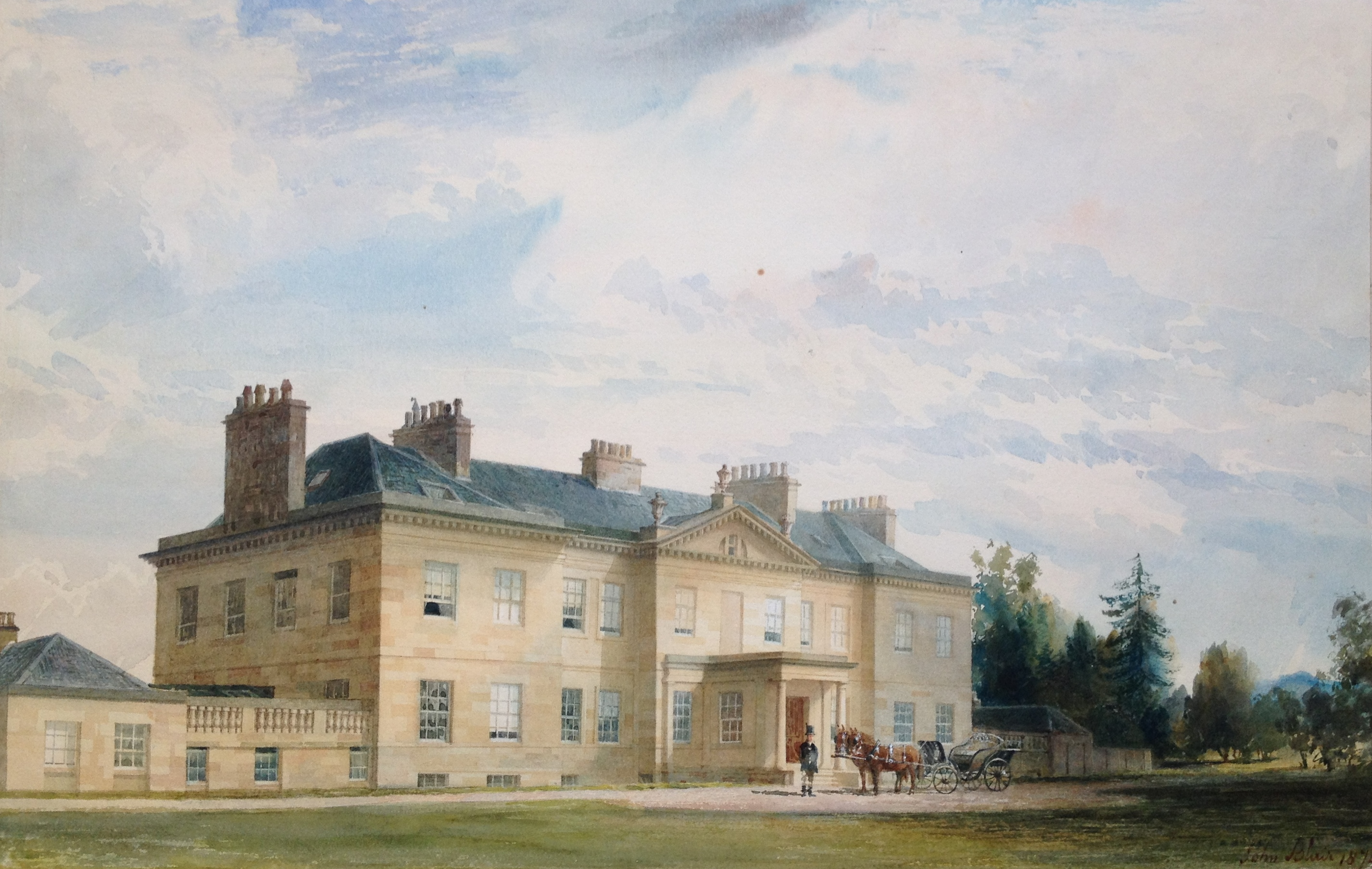
Mansion of the Lees, Berwickshire, seat of the Marjoribanks baronets, c.1869

== Notes ==
Peerage of the United Kingdom
Preceded by Dalrymple baronets	Marjoribanks baronets of Lees; 6 May 1815	Succeeded by McMahon baronets
