= John Meir Astbury =

British judge and politician (1860–1939)

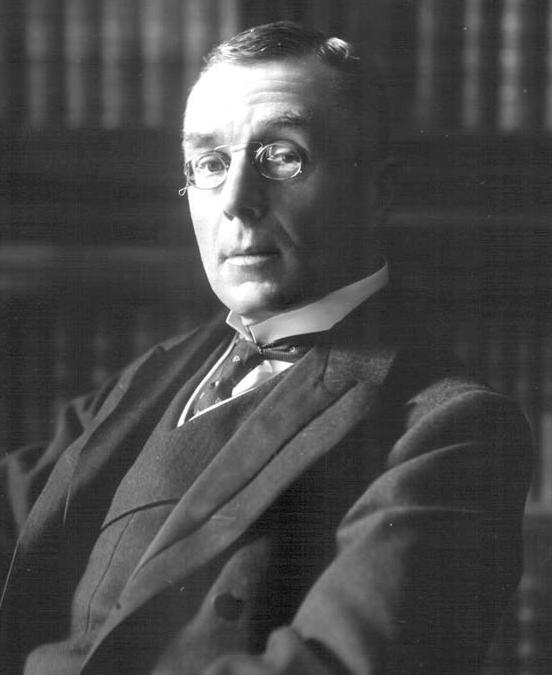
John Astbury

Sir John Meir Astbury (14 June 1860 – 21 August 1939) was a British judge and politician.

== Early life and career ==
Astbury was born at Grove House, Broughton, Salford, Lancashire, the son of Frederick James Astbury and Margaret née Munn. His father was a chartered accountant from Hilton Park, Prestwich, and John was educated at Manchester Grammar School before entering the University of Oxford.

He attended Trinity College, Oxford where he studied jurisprudence. He graduated with a second class degree in 1882, in the following year achieving a first class in the Bachelor of Civil Law examination. In 1884 he was awarded the university's Vinerian Scholarship. This enabled him to enter the Middle Temple as a law student. He was called to the bar in the same year, and became a bencher in 1903.

Astbury established a legal practice in Manchester, principally dealing with cases at the Palatine Chancery Court and at the Lancashire Assizes. In 1895 he "took silk" to become a Queen's Counsel. He moved to London, where he was attached to the courts of Sir Edmund Widdrington Byrne and Sir Henry Buckley successively.

In 1905 he became a Chancery "special", charging an additional fee for his expertise in patent law. The choice proved wise, and he conducted a very profitable practice until 1913.

== Member of Parliament ==
At the 1906 general election Astbury was chosen by the Liberal Party to contest the Lancashire constituency of Southport. There was a large swing to the Liberals, and Astbury unseated the Conservative Member of Parliament, Edward Marshall Hall, a fellow barrister. However, he had little interest in politics, and retired from the Commons at the next general election in January 1910.

== High Court judge ==
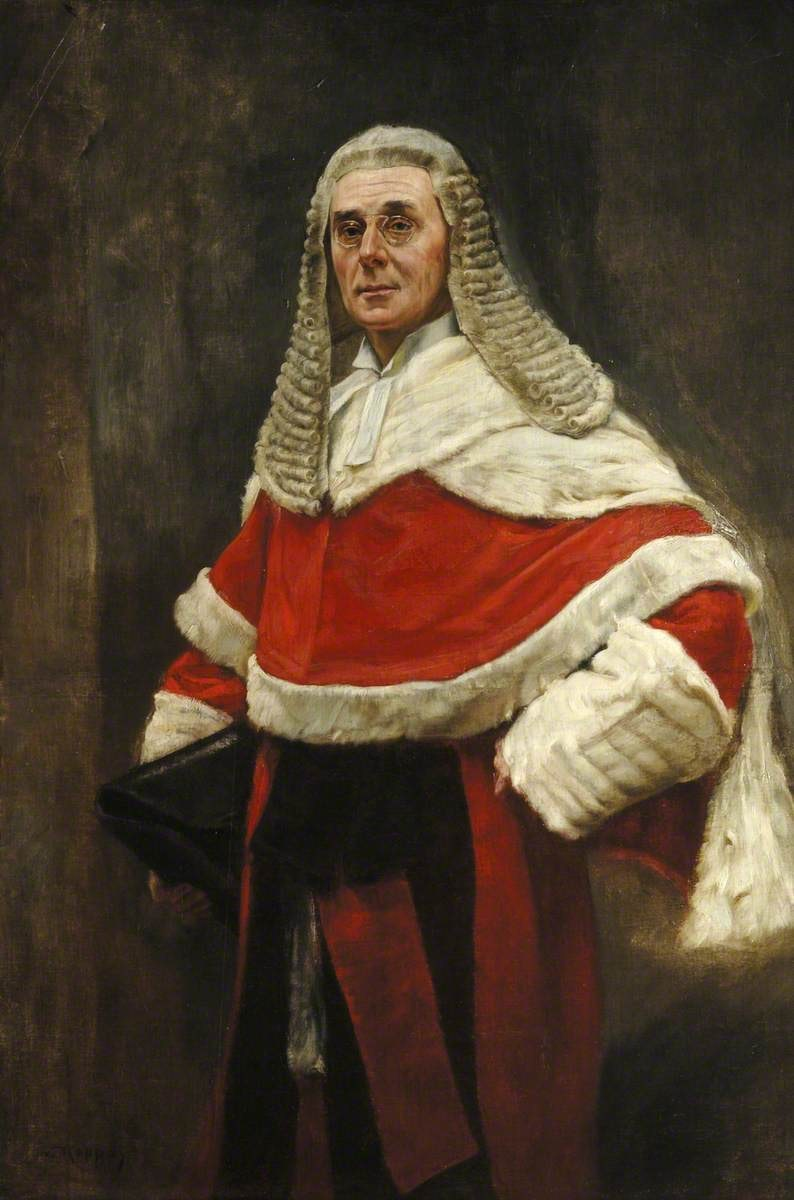
John Astbury

In 1913 Astbury was offered a vacant judgeship in the Chancery Division by the Lord Chancellor, Viscount Haldane. He accepted the position and was knighted. He held the post for sixteen years, in what was generally considered an undistinguished manner. He did, however, come to the notice of the public during the General Strike of 1926. His injunction on 11 May in favour of the National Sailors' and Firemen's Union of Great Britain was arguably instrumental in ending the strike on the following day.

He resigned his seat on the bench in October 1929 and was made a Privy Councillor the same year. Astbury had been made an honorary fellow of Trinity College in 1923 and on his retirement donated a large collection of legal textbooks and judgements to his alma mater.

== Family ==
Astbury was twice married. In 1888 he wed Evelyn Susmann, daughter of a Manchester merchant. Following her death in 1923, he married Harriet, widow of Captain Morrell Andrew Girdlestone and daughter of George Holmes of Philadelphia, Pennsylvania (USA). He had one child, a daughter from his first marriage, who died in a motor accident.

== Death ==
The last ten years of Astbury's life saw him struggling with blindness and the loss of his only child. He died at a hotel in Sandwich, Kent in August 1939 aged 79.

Parliament of the United Kingdom
Preceded by Edward Marshall Hall	Member of Parliament for Southport; 1906–1910	Succeeded by Godfrey Dalrymple-White
