= James Stuart Rankin =

British politician

James Stuart Rankin (1880–1960) was an English politician, Conservative MP for Liverpool East Toxteth.

He was returned unopposed at a by-election in 1916, was re-elected at subsequent general elections, but stood down in 1924.

== Notes ==
Parliament of the United Kingdom
Preceded by Edward Marshall Hall	Member of Parliament for Liverpool East Toxteth; 1916 – 1924	Succeeded by Albert Jacob
