= Dalrymple baronets of High Mark (1815) =

The Dalrymple baronetcy of High Mark was created on 6 March 1815, in the Baronetage of the United Kingdom, for Hew Whitefoord Dalrymple, eldest son of John Dalrymple and grandson of Sir Hew Dalrymple, 1st Baronet of the 1698 creation. A general in the earlier stages of the Peninsular War, he had been required to retire after his negotiation of the Convention of Cintra; but he went through the subsequent enquiry keeping a promise to Lord Castlereagh not to reveal the full powers he had been given to conclude terms for a French retreat.

This title became extinct on the death of his son Sir Adolphus, 2nd Baronet, on 3 March 1866.

== Dalrymple baronets, of High Mark (1815) ==
- Sir Hew Whitefoord Dalrymple, 1st Baronet (died 1830)
- Sir Adolphus John Dalrymple, 2nd Baronet (1784–1866) MP for Haddington Burghs 1826–31 and 1831–32.

== Notes ==
Peerage of the United Kingdom
Preceded by Buchan-Hepburn baronets	Dalrymple baronets of High Mark; 6 May 1815	Succeeded by Marjoribanks baronets
