= Austin Taylor (British politician) =

Austin Taylor (1858 – 27 April 1955) was a Conservative Party, later Liberal Party, politician in the United Kingdom.

== Early life ==
Taylor was born in Everton in 1858, the son of Rev. William Taylor, a vicar and later Archdeacon of Liverpool. His brother W. F. Taylor was a KC in the Northern Circuit and Recorder of Bolton and his brother Gerald Kyffin-Taylor was MP for Liverpool Kirkdale from 1910 to 1915. He was educated at Liverpool College and at Corpus Christi College, Cambridge, where he took his BA degree in 1880. Joining the steamship and merchants company Messrs. Hugh Evans and Co., he succeeded as head of the firm on the death of his uncle Hugh Evans in 1891.

== Political career ==
Taylor was a magistrate and prominent member of the Liverpool City Council. In 1892 he was elected municipal representative of the large and populous Everton Ward, but in 1895 declined re-election due to business commitments. At the following election in 1900, however, he again stood for election, this time for Dingle Ward, and after election he became chairman of the Housing Committee of the council. Taylor was president of the Liverpool Philomathic Society, and among the creators and later Chairman of the Liverpool Laymen's League.

He was elected as Member of Parliament (MP) for Liverpool East Toxteth at a by-election in November 1902 following the resignation of the Conservative MP Augustus Frederick Warr. He was re-elected unopposed in 1906. He was a Unionist Free Trader and resigned from the Conservative Party in February 1906, crossing the floor to join the Liberal Party. He stood down from the House of Commons at the January 1910 general election. In June 1918, the Liberal MP for Buckrose became ill and was looking to retire. The local Liberal Association selected Taylor as their candidate to succeed him. Due to the war-time electoral truce, Taylor expected to be elected in a by-election unopposed. However, the by-election was not called and a General Election was called for December instead. A Labour candidate was chosen to contest the seat. Taylor hoped to receive endorsement from the Coalition government, but at the eleventh hour, that endorsement was given to a latecomer to the contest, who stood as a Coalition Liberal and was elected instead.

== Family ==
Taylor married in 1886 Lucia Whitaker, daughter of Edward Whitaker, of Liverpool, and had four children.

Parliament of the United Kingdom
Preceded by Augustus Frederick Warr	Member of Parliament for Liverpool East Toxteth; 1902 – Jan. 1910	Succeeded by Edward Marshall-Hall
