= John Cressy-Hall =

English cricketer and merchant

Personal information
- Full name: John Walter Cressy-Hall
- Born: 4 August 1843; Brighton, Sussex, England
- Died: 7 April 1894 (aged 50); Kimberley, Cape Province, South Africa
- Batting: Unknown
- Bowling: Unknown

Domestic team information
- Years: Team
- 1873–1880: Marylebone Cricket Club

Career statistics
Competition	First-class
Matches	3
Runs scored	27
Batting average	5.40
100s/50s	–/–
Top score	12
Balls bowled	68
Wickets	2
Bowling average	24.00
5 wickets in innings	–
10 wickets in match	–
Best bowling	2/48
Catches/stumpings	4/–
- Source: Cricinfo, 27 April 2021

John Walter Cressy-Hall (4 August 1843 – 7 April 1894) was an English first-class cricketer and merchant.

The son of the physician Alfred Hall, John was born at Brighton in August 1843. He was educated there at Brighton College. After completing his education, Cressy-Hall became a merchant. He played first-class cricket for the Marylebone Cricket Club on three occasions, playing against Cambridge University in 1873, Derbyshire in 1878, and Hampshire in 1880. He scored 27 runs in these matches, in addition to taking two wickets. By 1894, Cressy-Hall was living in poverty at Kimberley in South Africa. He was financially supported by his younger brother, Sir Edward Marshall Hall, who sent money to him via Archdeacon Gaul. The two were not on good terms, with Cressy-Hall resenting being financially supported by his younger brother, to the extent that he sent offensive correspondences to him back in England. Cressy-Hall was found dead in his bed on 7 April 1894 at Kimberley.
