= Albert Jacob (British politician) =

British politician (1857–1929)

Albert Edward Jacob (1858 – 26 February 1929) was Director of W&R Jacob's, Biscuit Manufacturer and Unionist MP for Liverpool East Toxteth. He was elected at the 1924 general election, and held the seat until his death, causing a by-election, which was won by fellow Unionist Henry Mond.

Parliament of the United Kingdom
Preceded by James Stuart Rankin	Member of Parliament for Liverpool East Toxteth; 1924 – 1929	Succeeded by Henry Mond
