= Henry Mond, 2nd Baron Melchett =

British politician (1898–1949)

The Right Honourable The Lord Melchett
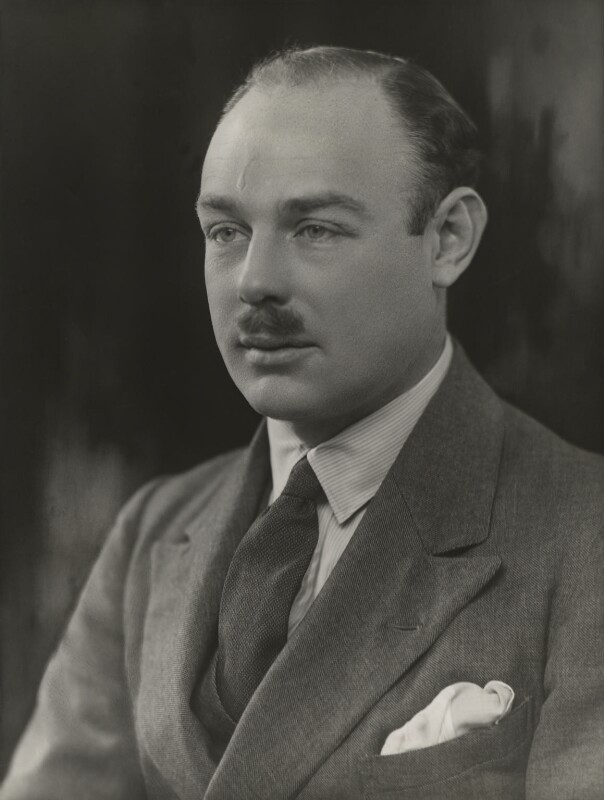

Baron

Member of Parliament for Liverpool East Toxteth
- In office 19 March 1929 – 27 December 1930
- Preceded by: Albert Jacob
- Succeeded by: Patrick Buchan-Hepburn

Member of Parliament for Isle of Ely
- In office 6 December 1923 – 9 October 1924
- Preceded by: Norman Coates
- Succeeded by: Hugh Lucas-Tooth

Personal details
- Born: Henry Ludwig Mond; 10 May 1898 London, England
- Died: 22 January 1949 (aged 50) Miami Beach, Florida, USA
- Spouse: Amy Gwen Wilson
- Children: 3, including Julian, 3rd Baron Melchett
- Parent(s): Alfred Mond, 1st Baron Melchett; Violet Goetze
- Education: Winchester College
- Occupation: Politician, industrialist, financier

Henry Ludwig Mond, 2nd Baron Melchett (10 May 1898 – 22 January 1949) was a British politician, industrialist and financier.

== Early life and education ==
Henry Mond was born in London, the only son of Alfred Mond, 1st Baron Melchett and his wife Violet (née Goetze). He was educated at Winchester College. In the First World War he was commissioned with the South Wales Borderers on 9 April 1915 and wounded in 1916.

== Business life ==
He then joined some of his father's businesses, becoming a director of Imperial Chemical Industries and serving as deputy chairman from 1940 to 1947. He was also a director of the Mond Nickel Company and Barclays Bank.

== Politics ==
He served as Member of Parliament for the Isle of Ely 1923–24 as a Liberal. He won against Unionist candidate Max Townley in the 1923 general election with a small majority of 467. In the same election his father, Sir Alfred Mond, Bt, lost his seat of Swansea West. He was unable to retain the Isle of Ely at the 1924 general election.

Like his father, he later became a Conservative. He was Conservative Member of Parliament for Liverpool East Toxteth from 1929 to 1930, when, on the death of his father, he succeeded to the barony becoming the 2nd Baron Melchett. He then set about restoring the family finances and moved his interests away from politics to economics.

== Religion ==
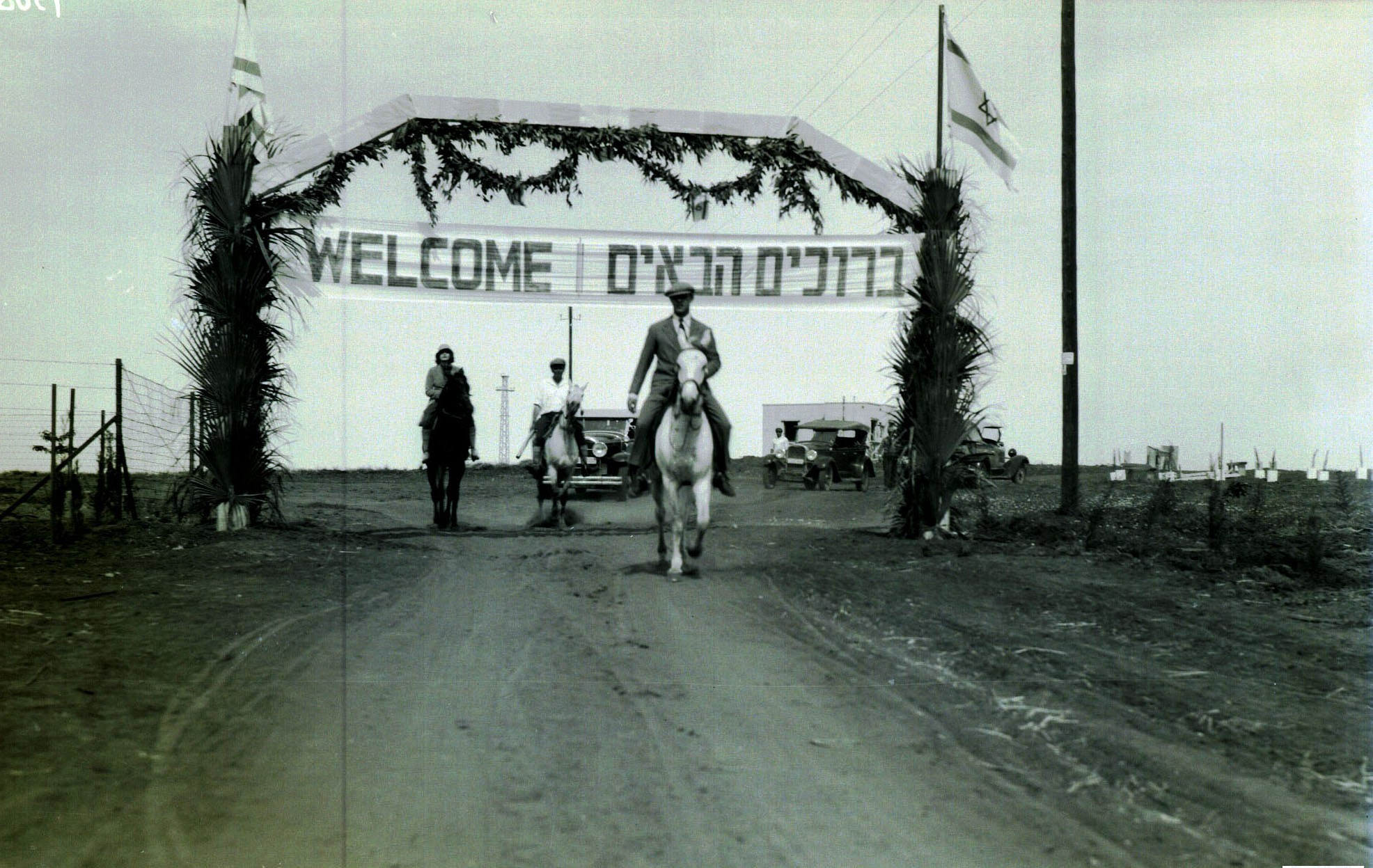
Henry Mond visits Tel Mond, founded in 1929 in Palestine

Having been brought up in the Church of England, he converted in the 1930s to his father's Judaism and became a champion of Zionism, hoping that the Jews and Arabs could live harmoniously alongside each other. He advocated the evacuation of Jews from Germany to Palestine and supported the formation of an independent state of Palestine as part of the British Commonwealth. He was chairman of the Jewish Agency for Palestine and took an interest in the Maccabi Jewish youth organisation.

== Personal life ==
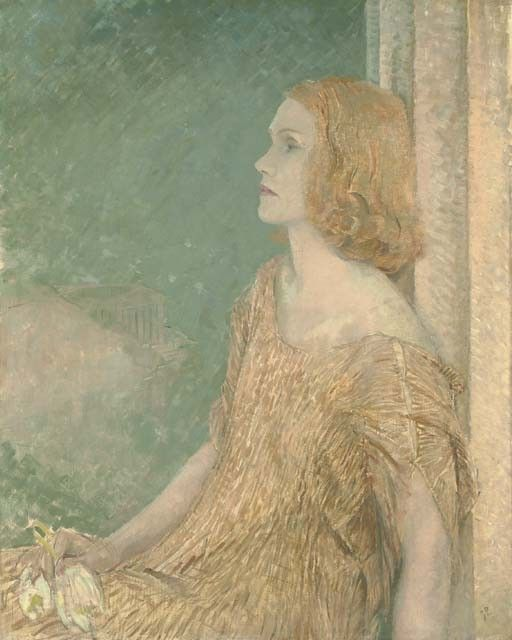
Gwen Mond, Lady Melchett, 1935, by Glyn Philpot

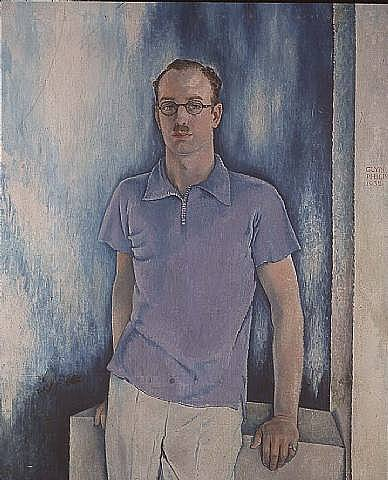
Portrait of Mond painted by Philpot, 1932

He married Amy Gwen Wilson (usually called Gwen, the daughter of Edward John Wilson, who lived in Johannesburg), at Chelsea Register Office on 30 January 1920. She was described as "a show stopping beauty and artist". Their relationship began when she was living with writer Gilbert Cannan, a friend of D. H. Lawrence, and they initially formed a ménage à trois.

From 1930 the couple lived in a London home, Mulberry House in Smith Square, Westminster. Paying homage to their early relationship, they commissioned a 1.6 metres (5.2 ft) high relief from the prominent artist Charles Sargeant Jagger called "Scandal", which they displayed in their living room. This showed a naked couple in an intimate embrace watched by society ladies in a state of outrage. The sculpture and the Baron's relationship led to censure and outrage from their contemporaries. In 2008 "Scandal" was bought for £106,000 by the Victoria and Albert Museum where it is on display.

== Family ==
They had had two sons – the Honourable Derek John Henry Mond (18 October 1922 – 30 April 1945), Julian (9 January 1925 – 15 June 1973), and one daughter, the Honourable Karis Valerie Violet (26 July 1927 – 8 February 2006). Derek was killed in a flying accident while he was serving with the Royal Naval Volunteer Reserve in 1945.

Mond bought and restored Colworth House on the edge of the Bedfordshire village of Sharnbrook and lived there for twelve years. During World War II he made the house available for the recuperation of American nurses and to house Jewish refugees. He sold the house to Unilever in 1947 due to his wife's belief that moving to Florida would restore his health. He died at Miami Beach, Florida in 1949 aged 50 and the title passed to his surviving son Julian. Mond was cremated in Islington.

== Publications ==
- Why the Crisis? (1931)
- Modern Money (1932)
- Thy Neighbour (1937)
- Hunting and Polo

== Coat of arms ==
Coat of arms of Henry Mond, 2nd Baron Melchett
Notes Coat of arms of Mond, Barons Melchett Coronet A coronet of a Baron Crest A Demi-Bear holding between the paws a Fountain both proper. Escutcheon Quarterly: 1st and 4th, Gules a Demi-Lion rampant argent between in chief a Decrescent and an Increscent and in base a Crescent all Or on a Chief Argent an Eagle displayed between two Mullets Sable (Mond); 2nd and 3rd, Azure on a Pile between three Mullets Argent an Eagle displayed Sable (Lowenthal). Supporters Dexter: a Doctor of Science of the University of Oxford holding in the exterior hand a Chemical Measure Glass; Sinister: a Labourer holding in the exterior hand a Pick resting on the shoulder, all proper. Motto Make Yourself Necessary

== Images ==
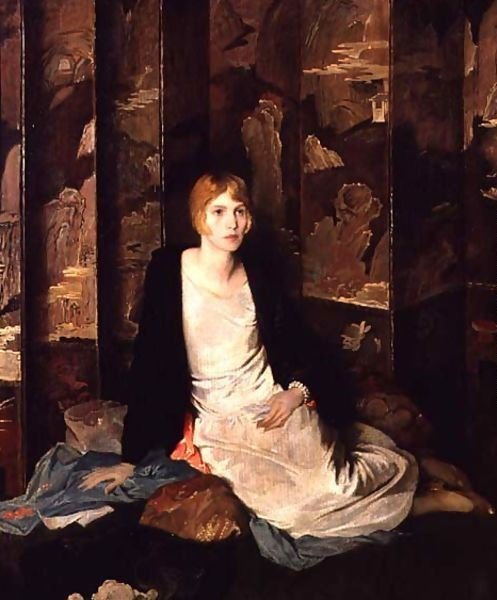
Mrs. Henry Mond by Glyn Philpot

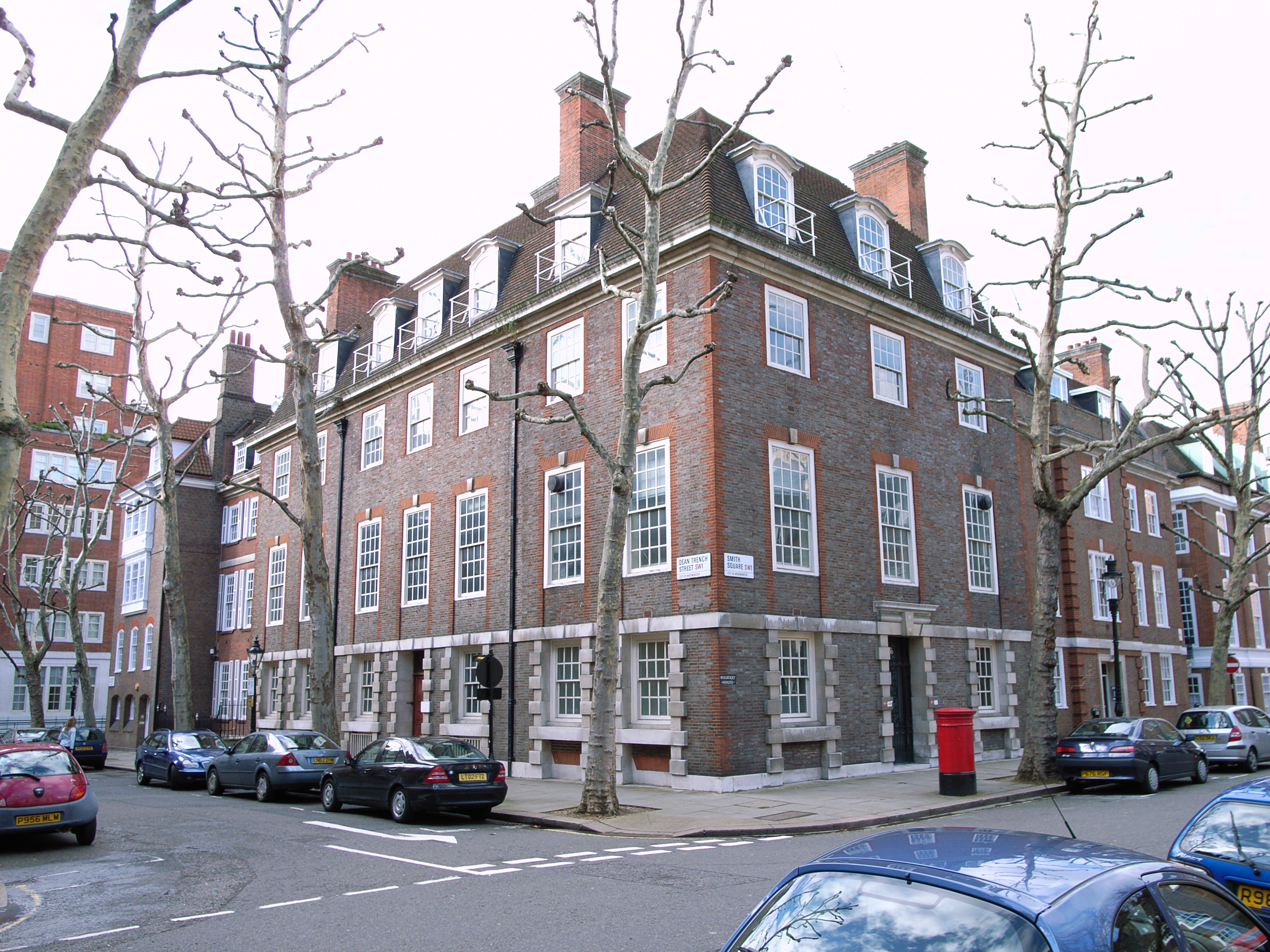
Mulberry House on Smith Square, London

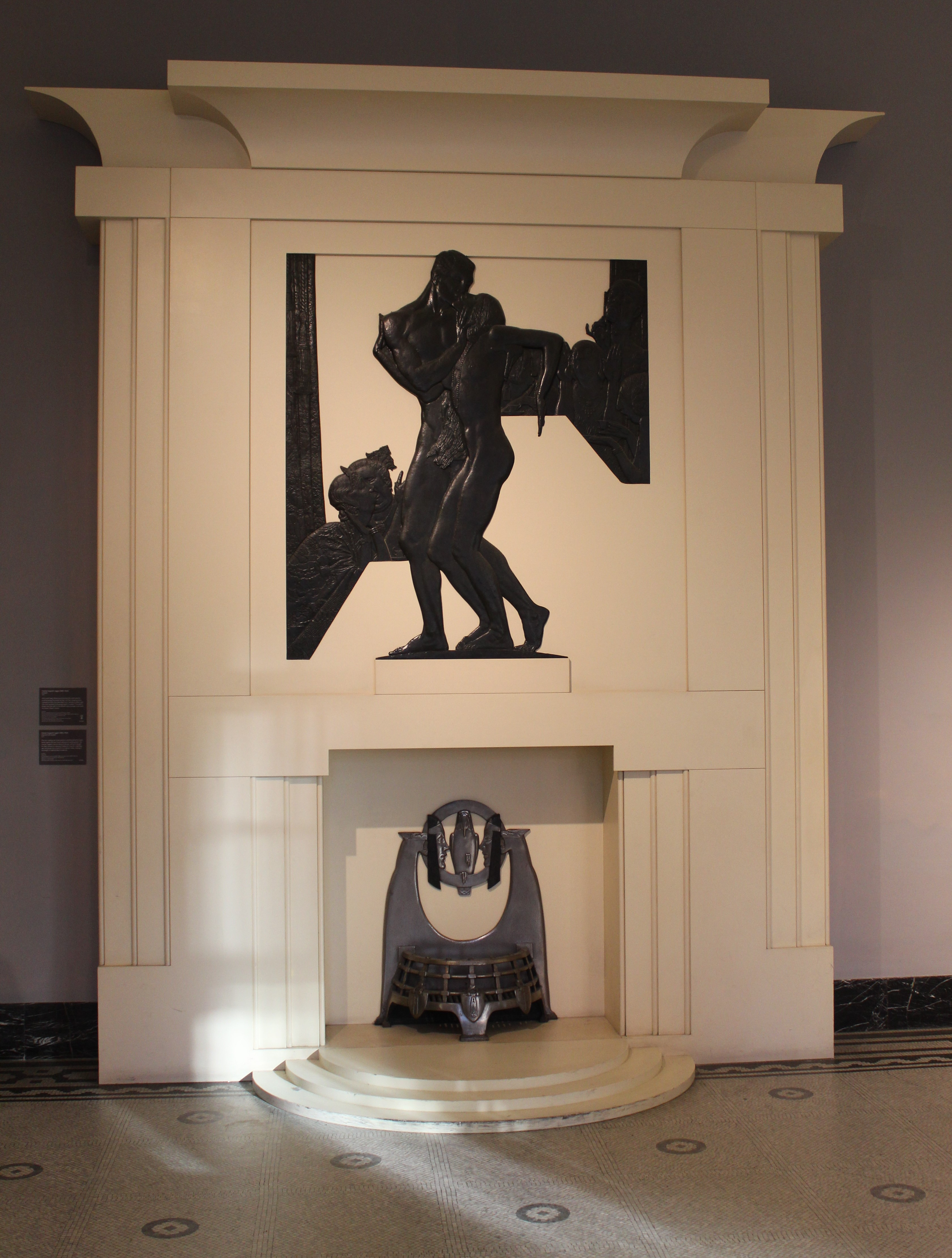
"Scandal" sculpture and fireplace from Mulberry House; by Charles Sargeant Jagger (Victoria and Albert Museum)

== See also ==
- Ludwig Mond Award
- Melchett Medal
- Mond gas
- Brunner Mond

== Notes ==
Parliament of the United Kingdom
Preceded by Norman Coates	Member of Parliament for Isle of Ely; 1923–1924	Succeeded by Hugh Lucas-Tooth
Preceded by Albert Jacob	Member of Parliament for Liverpool East Toxteth; 1929–1930	Succeeded by Patrick Buchan-Hepburn
Peerage of the United Kingdom
Preceded by Alfred Moritz Mond	Baron Melchett; 1930–1949	Succeeded by Julian Mond
