= Augustus Frederick Warr =

British politician

Augustus Frederick Warr (September 1847 – 24 March 1908) was an English solicitor from Liverpool and a Conservative Party politician. He sat in the House of Commons from 1895 to 1902.

== Early life ==
Warr was the third son of Rev George Winter Warr, a Church of England vicar of St Saviour's Church in Liverpool and the Canon of Liverpool from 1880 until his death in 1895. He was educated at the Royal Institution School in Liverpool, and qualified as a solicitor in 1870.

He married the sister of the lawyer Gorell Barnes.

== Career ==
Warr specialised in commercial law, on which he became an established authority. He became a partner in the firm of Batestons, Warr & Wimshurt, and served as President of the Liverpool Law Society in 1892.

He was elected as a Liverpool City Councillor in November 1894. The Conservative Member of Parliament (MP) Baron Henry de Worms was ennobled in November 1895, giving him a seat and the House of Lords and creating a vacancy in his Commons seat, the East Toxteth division of Liverpool. Warr was selected as the Conservative candidate for the resulting by-election, and was returned unopposed.

He was re-elected unopposed at the general election in 1900, but found that the increasing workload of Parliament was incompatible with his legal work in Liverpool and his wife's long-term illness. He resigned his seat on 27 October 1902 by the procedural device of accepting appointment as Steward of the Chiltern Hundreds, triggering another by-election.

Warr died suddenly at the age of 60 on 24 March 1908, after returning home from business.

Parliament of the United Kingdom
Preceded by Baron Henry de Worms	Member of Parliament for Liverpool East Toxteth; 1895 – 1902	Succeeded by Austin Taylor
