= 1895 Liverpool East Toxteth by-election =

UK parliamentary by-election

The 1895 Liverpool East Toxteth by-election was a parliamentary by-election held in England on 29 November 1895 for the British House of Commons constituency of Liverpool East Toxteth.

== Vacancy ==
On 14 November the Conservative Member of Parliament (MP), Baron Henry de Worms was ennobled as Baron Pirbright. His previous title was as a Hereditary Baron of the Austrian Empire, but his British peerage gave him a seat in the House of Lords, and automatically disqualified him from the Commons.

== Candidates ==
The Conservatives selected as their candidate Augustus Frederick Warr, a local solicitor working in the field of commercial law. Warr was a Liverpool City Councillor and a former President of the Liverpool Law Society. His father, who died later that year, had been the vicar of St Saviour's Church in Liverpool.

== Result ==
The writ was received on 26 November, and Friday 29 November was set as nomination day, with polling on Tuesday 3 December.

However, at the close of nominations on Friday, Warr was the only candidate, so he was returned unopposed without any need for a vote.

== Aftermath ==
Warr was re-elected unopposed at the next general election, in 1900. He resigned his seat in October 1902, and died in 1908.

== See also ==
- Liverpool East Toxteth constituency
- Toxteth
- 1902 Liverpool East Toxteth by-election
- 1916 Liverpool East Toxteth by-election
- 1929 Liverpool East Toxteth by-election
- 1931 Liverpool East Toxteth by-election
- List of United Kingdom by-elections (1885–1900)
