= Marguerite Alibert =

French socialite (1890–1971)

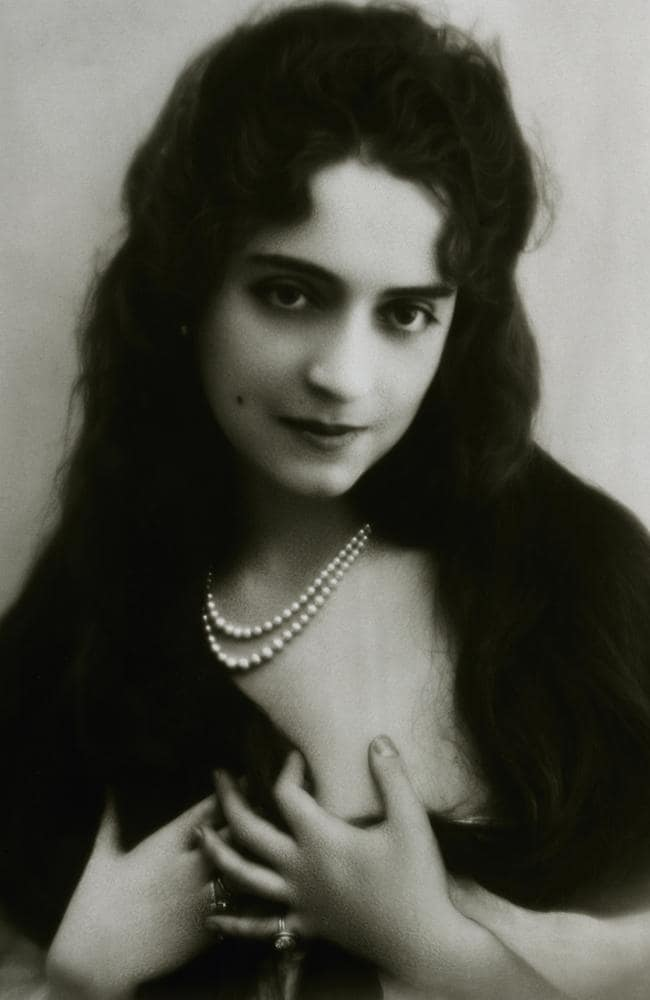
- Born: 9 December 1890; Paris, French Third Republic
- Died: 2 January 1971 (aged 80); Paris, France
- Other names: Maggie Meller; Princess Fahmy; Marguerite Laurent
- Known for: socialite, acquitted murderer
- Spouses: Charles Laurent (m. 1919; div. 1920) Ali Kamel Fahmy Bey (m. 1922; died 1923)
- Children: 1

Marguerite Marie Alibert (9 December 1890 – 2 January 1971), also known as Maggie Meller, Marguerite Laurent, and Princess Fahmy, was a French socialite. She started her career as a prostitute and later courtesan in Paris, and from 1917 to 1918, she had an affair with the Prince of Wales (later Edward VIII). After her marriage to Egyptian aristocrat Ali Kamel Fahmy Bey, she was frequently called princess by the news media of the time. In 1923, she killed her husband at the Savoy Hotel in London, England. She was eventually acquitted of the murder charge after a trial at the Old Bailey.

== Life ==
Marguerite Marie Alibert was born on 9 December 1890 in Paris to Firmin Alibert, a coachman, and Marie Aurand, a housekeeper. At age 16, she gave birth to a daughter, Raymonde. In the following eight to ten years, Alibert led a nomadic life until she met Madame Denant, who ran a maison de rendezvous, a brothel catering to a high society clientele. Under the tutelage of Denant, Alibert became a high-class sex worker. Alibert had a number of notable clients, particularly Edward, Prince of Wales.

Alibert and Edward first met in April 1917 at the Hôtel de Crillon in Paris. At the time, he was in France as an officer of the Grenadier Guards in the Western Front during World War I. Edward became infatuated with her, and during their relationship, he wrote many letters to her. Although the affair was intense while it lasted, by the end of the war, Edward had ended the relationship.

=== Ali Fahmy Bey ===
Ali Fahmy Bey became infatuated with Alibert when he first encountered her in Egypt while she was escorting a businessman. He saw her again several times in Paris, and they were eventually formally introduced in July 1922. Following that meeting, they embarked on a tour of gambling and entertainment establishments in Deauville, Biarritz, and Paris. Fahmy returned to Egypt, but soon after, he invited her to the country, feigning illness and telling her that he could not live without her. They were married civilly in December 1922 and had an Islamic wedding in January 1923.

==== Killing of Ali Fahmy ====
On 1 July 1923, the couple arrived in London. They stayed at the Savoy Hotel with their entourage consisting of a secretary, a valet, and a maid. On 9 July, the couple and the secretary went to see the operetta The Merry Widow. Upon returning to the hotel, they had a late supper where they started one of their frequent arguments. At 2:30 a.m. on 10 July, Alibert shot her husband repeatedly from behind, striking him in the neck, back, and head. She used a .32 calibre semi-automatic Browning pistol. Fahmy was transported to Charing Cross Hospital, and succumbed to his injuries an hour later.

==== Trial ====
The trial opened on Monday, 10 September 1923, with many people queuing to enter, including some who had waited since before daybreak. The trial lasted until Saturday, 15 September. During the trial, Alibert presented herself as the victim of the "brutality and beastliness" of her "oriental husband". Alibert was defended by Edward Marshall Hall, one of the more famous British lawyers of that era. The trial judge disallowed any mention of Alibert's past as a courtesan, ensuring that the name of the Prince of Wales never was mentioned as part of the evidence during the trial. At the same time, Fahmy was described as "a monster of Eastern depravity and decadence, whose sexual tastes were indicative of an amoral sadism towards his helpless European wife". Alibert was acquitted of all charges.

==== Post-trial ====
After the trial, Alibert sued her late husband's family for his property. A court in Egypt rejected the verdict at the Old Bailey and dismissed her claim. She lived in an apartment facing the Ritz in Paris until the end of her life. After her death, the few remaining letters from Edward, which she had kept as insurance, were found and destroyed by a friend.

== In culture ==
=== Books ===
The killing of Alibert's husband was the focus of the 1991 book, Scandal at the Savoy: The Infamous 1920s Murder Case by judge and historian Andrew Rose. In the 2013 follow-on work, The Prince, the Princess and the Perfect Murder, Andrew Rose revealed — with the help of Alibert's grandson — that the acquittal of Alibert of the charges of murdering her husband was part of a deal for returning the love letters of the Prince of Wales to him and a guarantee by Alibert that Edward's name would not be mentioned in court. Rose stated: "Really this was a show trial, the authorities wanted Marguerite to be acquitted. A murder conviction would have been catastrophic for the Crown."

The story of Alibert is retold in the 2022 debut novel, The Keeper of Stories by Sally Page, as told by the character Mrs. B., a former spy, to the keeper of stories, her cleaner, Janice; Alibert is given the alias Becky. This is clarified in the Author's Note found on page 375 of the paperback version.

=== Television ===
The trial was dramatised as part of the Granada Television series Lady Killers, broadcast on 20th July 1980, starring Robert Stephens and Barbara Kellerman.

In 2013, the British Channel 4 aired the documentary Edward VIII's Murderous Mistress: Was there a cover-up of Edward VIII's fling with a murderess?

In November 2024, Channel 4 broadcast A History of Royal Scandals series 2 episode 4 entitled Crime in which Suzannah Lipscomb discussed Alibert's relationship with Edward, Prince of Wales, her trial for the shooting of husband Ali Fahmy, and the influence of authorities to ensure Alibert's acquittal.

=== Radio ===
The trial of Marguerite Alibert for the murder of Ali Fahmy Bey was presented in a 2023 episode of the BBC Radio 4 series Lucy Worsley's Lady Killers.
