= George Buchan-Hepburn =

Sir George Buchan-Hepburn, 1st Baronet FRSE FSA (1739–1819) was a Scottish landowner and judge, generally remembered for his books on agriculture.

== Life ==
Born George Buchan, the son of John Buchan of Letham, East Lothian, by Elizabeth Hepburn, daughter of Patrick Hepburn of Smeaton, he was born in March 1739. He was educated at the University of Edinburgh, where Henry Dundas was among his close friends.

Buchan succeeded to the barony of Smeaton-Hepburn in 1764, and assumed the name and arms of Hepburn of Smeaton. In January 1763 he had been admitted a member of the Faculty of Advocates, Edinburgh, and from 1767 he was solicitor to the lords of session till 1790, when he was appointed judge of the High Court of Admiralty in Scotland. On 31 December of the following year he was made baron of the exchequer. He retired in 1814, and on 6 May 1815 was created a baronet.

From 1815 to 1818 he was a Director of the Royal Bank of Scotland.

Buchan died at Smeaton House on 3 July 1819.

== Works ==
Buchan was the author of The General View of the Agriculture and Rural Economy of East Lothian, with Observations on the Means of their Improvement, 1796.

== Family ==
Buchan married twice:

1. Firstly to Jane or Jean Leith, eldest daughter of Alexander Leith of Glenkindy and Freefield, and
2. Secondly in 1781 to Margaretta Henrietta Fraser, daughter of John Zacharias Beck, and widow of Brigadier-general Fraser.

By his first wife he had an only son John, who succeeded him in the baronetcy.

== Notes ==
Attribution

This article incorporates text from a publication now in the public domain: Stephen, Leslie; Lee, Sidney, eds. (1891). "Hepburn, George Buchan". Dictionary of National Biography. Vol. 26. London: Smith, Elder & Co.

Baronetage of the United Kingdom
New creation	Baronet (of Smeaton-Hepburn); 1815–1819	Succeeded by John Buchan-Hepburn
