= Patrick Buchan-Hepburn, 1st Baron Hailes =

British politician (1901–1974)

The Right Honourable The Lord Hailes GBE CH PC
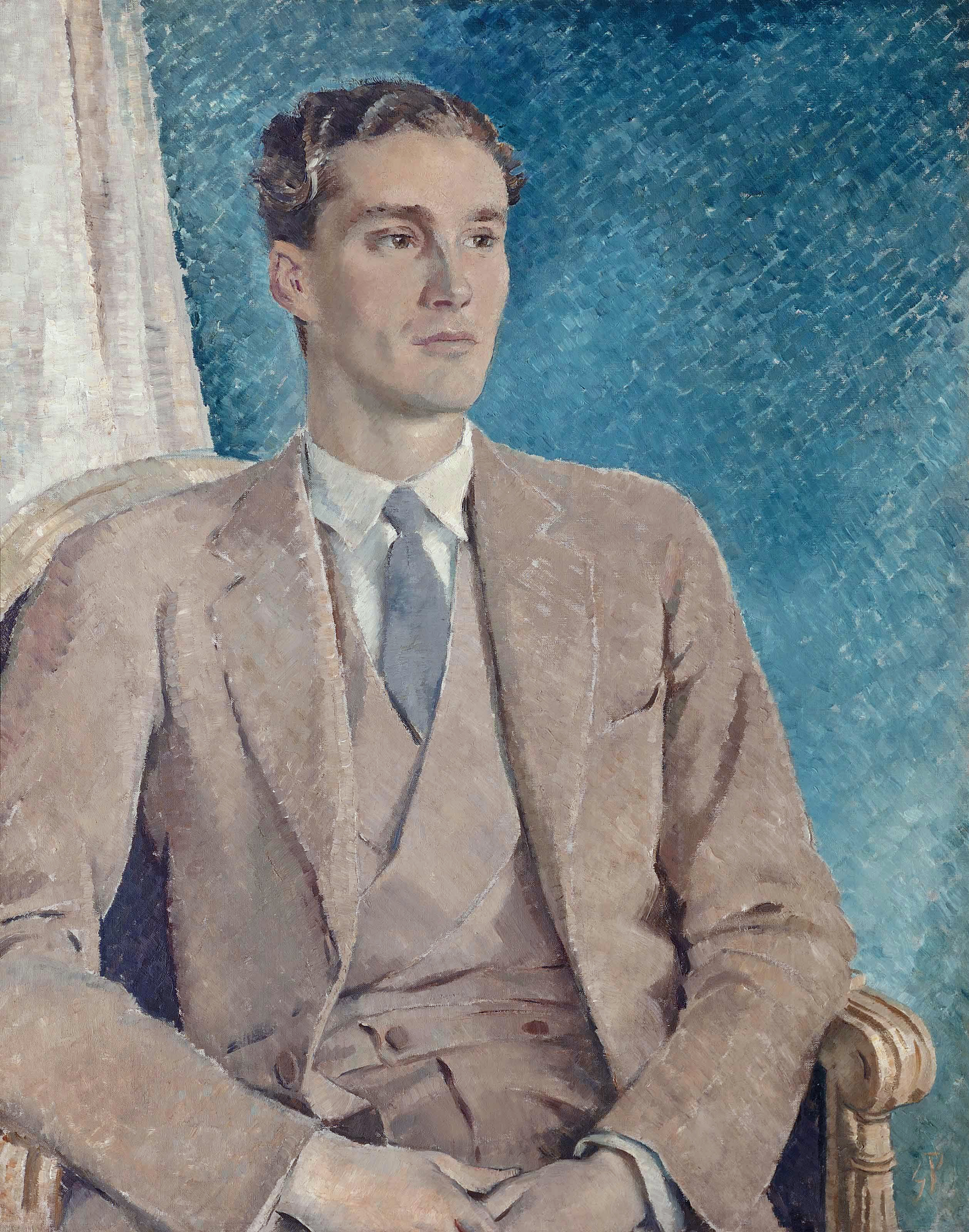

Governor-General of the West Indies Federation
- In office 3 January 1958 – 31 May 1962
- Monarch: Elizabeth II
- Prime Minister: Grantley Herbert Adams
- Preceded by: Office established
- Succeeded by: Office abolished

Government Chief Whip in the House of Commons; Parliamentary Secretary to the Treasury
- In office 30 October 1951 – 30 December 1955
- Prime Minister: Winston Churchill; Anthony Eden
- Deputy: Herbert Butcher (1951–1953); Harry Mackeson (1951–1952); Edward Heath (1952–1955)
- Preceded by: William Whiteley
- Succeeded by: Edward Heath

Opposition Chief Whip of the House of Commons
- In office 4 July 1948 – 26 October 1951
- Deputy: Cedric Drewe (1948–1951); Harry Mackeson (1950–1951)
- Leader: Winston Churchill
- Preceded by: James Stuart
- Succeeded by: Herbert Bowden

Opposition Deputy Chief Whip of the House of Commons
- In office July 1945 – 4 July 1948
- Leader: Winston Churchill
- Preceded by: George Mathers
- Succeeded by: Cedric Drewe

Member of Parliament for Beckenham
- In office 23 February 1950 – 15 February 1957
- Preceded by: Constituency established
- Succeeded by: Philip Goodhart

Member of Parliament for East Toxteth
- In office 5 February 1931 – 23 February 1950
- Preceded by: Henry Mond
- Succeeded by: Reginald Bevins

Personal details
- Born: Patrick George Thomas Buchan-Hepburn; 2 April 1901
- Died: 5 November 1974 (aged 73)
- Party: Conservative
- Spouse: Diana
- Parent(s): Sir Archibald Buchan-Hepburn & Edith Karslake
- Education: Harrow School
- Alma mater: Trinity College

Patrick George Thomas Buchan-Hepburn, 1st Baron Hailes, GBE, CH, PC (2 April 1901 – 5 November 1974) was a British Conservative politician and the only Governor-General of the short-lived West Indies Federation from 1958 to 1962.

== Background and education ==
Buchan-Hepburn was the youngest son of Sir Archibald Buchan-Hepburn, 4th Baronet (see Buchan-Hepburn baronets) and his wife Edith Agnes (née Karslake). He was educated at Harrow and Trinity College, Cambridge.

== Political career ==
Buchan-Hepburn was a personal secretary to Winston Churchill and a London County Councillor. Having stood unsuccessfully for election as a Member of Parliament (MP) in Wolverhampton East at the 1929 general election, he became MP for the East Toxteth division of Liverpool following a by-election in February 1931. In November 1939, he was appointed a Parliamentary Whip for the Conservative Party and a Lord of the Treasury. In July 1940, almost a year into the Second World War, he received an emergency commission as a second lieutenant into the Royal Artillery.

Returning to politics in 1945, Buchan-Hepburn became Deputy Whip and then, in 1948, Chief Whip. He was elected MP for the newly created Beckenham constituency in Kent after his East Toxteth constituency was abolished by boundary changes before the 1950 general election. From 1951 to 1955, he was Government Chief Whip and Parliamentary Secretary to the Treasury. In 1957, he was raised to the peerage as Baron Hailes of Prestonkirk in the County of East Lothian. Lord Hailes was appointed a Knight Grand Cross of the Order of the British Empire in September 1957.

When, in 1958, the West Indies Federation was formed in response to complaints against British colonialism in the Caribbean, Lord Hailes was appointed the Federation's first Governor-General and relocated to Port of Spain on the island of Trinidad. Four years later, the new state was dissolved and he returned to the United Kingdom, where he served as Chairman of the Historic Buildings Council (a predecessor of English Heritage, formally known as the Historic Buildings and Monuments Commission for England).

In the 1962 Birthday Honours Lord Hailes was appointed a Member of the Order of the Companions of Honour.

== Personal life ==
Buchan-Hepburn married Diana Mary, daughter of Brigadier-General the Hon. Charles Lambton and war widow of Major William Hedworth Williamson, in 1945. They had no children. He was step-father to Diana's son, Sir Nicholas Frederick Hedworth Williamson, 11th Baronet.

Buchan-Hepburn died in November 1974, aged 73, whence his barony became extinct.

== Footnotes ==
Parliament of the United Kingdom
Preceded by Henry Mond	Member of Parliament for Liverpool East Toxteth; 1931–1950	Constituency abolished
New constituency	Member of Parliament for Beckenham; 1950–1957	Succeeded by Philip Goodhart
Political offices
Preceded by William Whiteley	Government Chief Whip in the House of Commons; Parliamentary Secretary to the Treasury; 1951–1955	Succeeded by Edward Heath
Party political offices
Preceded by James Edmondson	Conservative Deputy Chief Whip in the House of Commons; 1945–1948	Succeeded by Cedric Drewe
Preceded by James Stuart	Chief Whip of the Conservative Party; 1948–1955	Succeeded by Edward Heath
Peerage of the United Kingdom
New creation	Baron Hailes; 1957–1974	Extinct
