= Smeaton, East Lothian =

Village and estate in East Lothian, Scotland

Smeaton
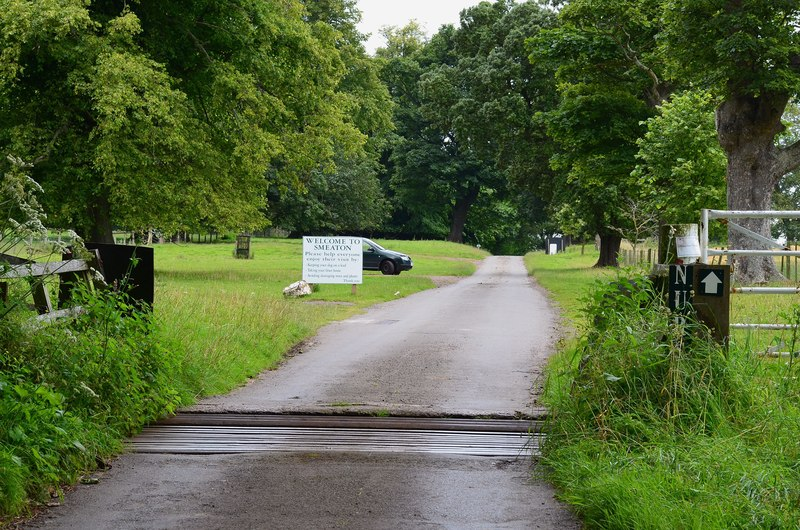
- Entrance to Smeaton House Estate

- Location within Scotland
- OS grid reference: NT593785
- Civil parish: Prestonkirk
- Council area: East Lothian Council
- Lieutenancy area: East Lothian
- Country: Scotland
- Sovereign state: United Kingdom
- Post town: EAST LINTON
- Postcode district: EH40
- Dialling code: 01620
- Police: Scotland
- Fire: Scottish
- Ambulance: Scottish
- UK Parliament: East Lothian
- Scottish Parliament: East Lothian

Smeaton is a village and country estate in East Lothian, Scotland. It is off the B1407, near East Linton, and very close to Prestonkirk Parish Church as well as the National Trust for Scotland properties Preston Mill and Phantassie Doocot.

== The Estate ==
The Smeaton Estate belonged to the Hepburn family for 400 years, until 1934. It is now owned by the Gray family, but it remains to be called "Smeaton-Hepburn Estate". The mansion no longer exists.

(Smeaton House, which is 19 miles away and located within the Dalkeith Palace Estate, is not an adjacent or related property.)

== Smeaton Lake and parkland ==
Smeaton Lake
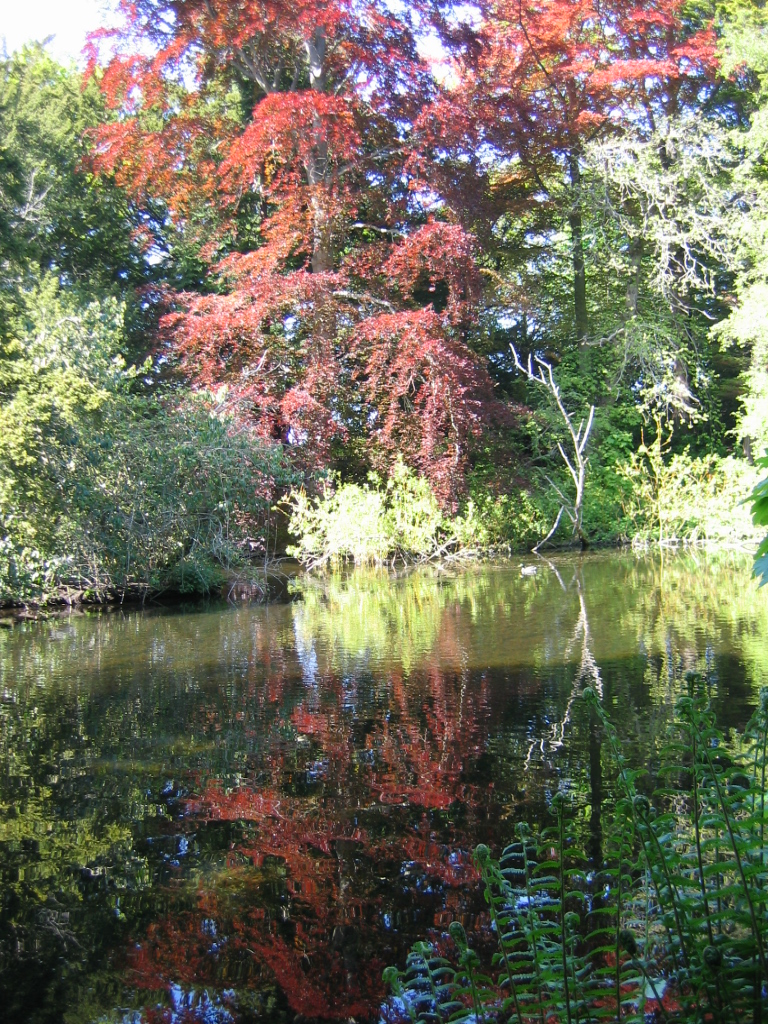

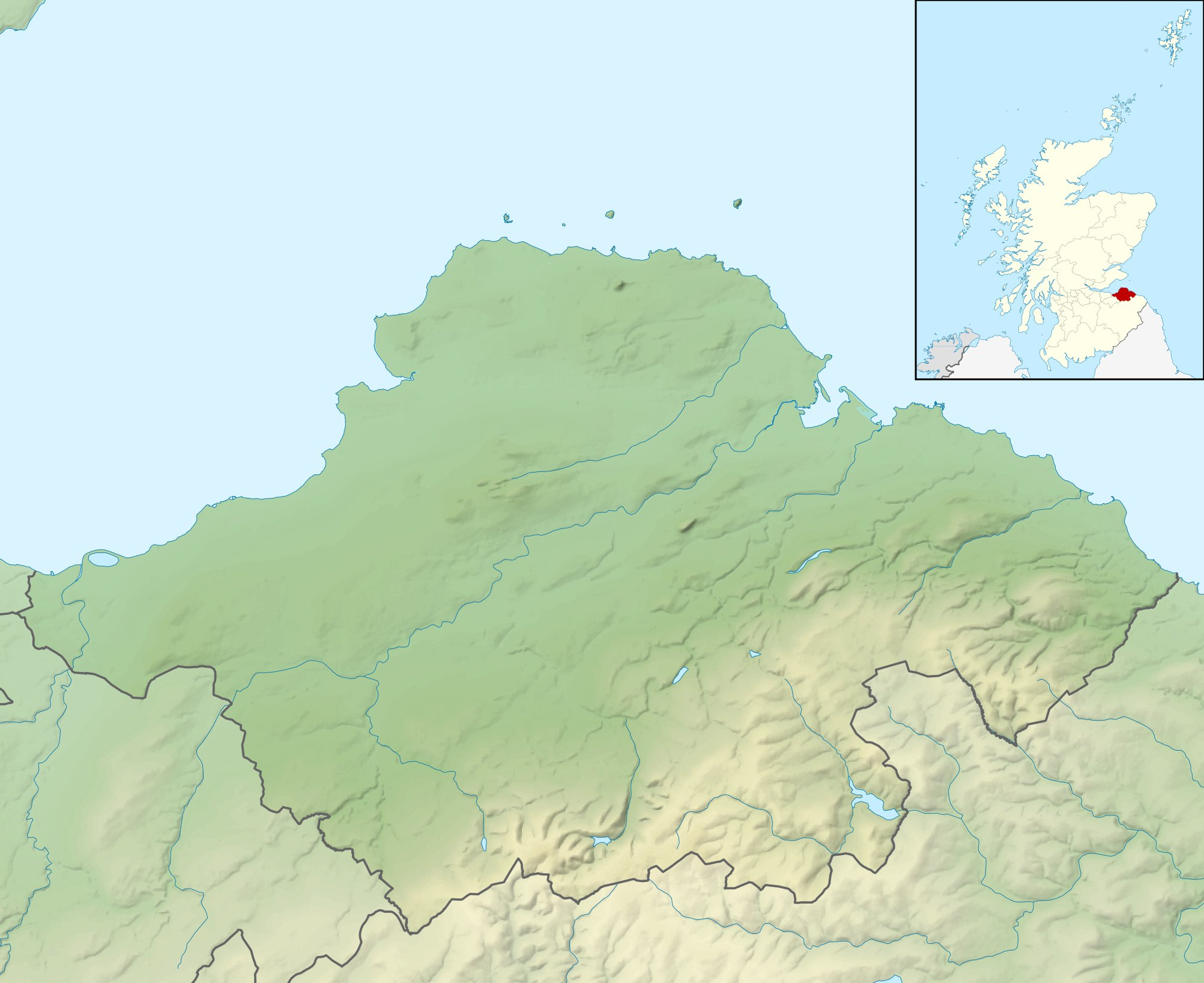
- Location within East Lothian Location within Scotland
- Location: Smeaton, East Lothian, Scotland
- Coordinates: 55°59′51″N 02°39′35″W
- Type: artificial lake
- Basin countries: United Kingdom

Smeaton Lake is one of a handful of "lakes" in Scotland - most are referred to as lochs. With the exception of the Lake of Menteith, they are all artificial.

In 1764, George Buchan-Hepburn succeeded George Hepburn as laird of Smeaton. He was a passionate farmer and agricultural reformer. His descendants continued his work, and in 1820, a lake was created with a circular walkway. It is renowned for the variety of mature specimen trees.

The gales of 1968 and of Boxing Day 1998 caused damage to a number of trees, and in 2005, a team of forty tree surgeons did some remedial work.

In the winter months the lake was used for curling competitions and continued to do so until 1982. Sit Thomas Hepburn, Baron Smeaton, was President of the Royal Caledonian Curling Club. In recent years, curling matches have not been possible because the tall trees provide good protection from the frost.

Although Smeaton is a privately owned estate, members of the public are allowed to walk around the lake from 10am till dusk, free of charge, using either of the two gates. The lake entrance is about 20 mins walk from the entrance lodge.

== Smeaton Nursery ==
Smeaton Nursery & Gardens is a plant nursery in a 2-acre (8,100 m^{2}) Victorian walled garden, with a Victorian conservatory serving as a tearoom.

== Photo gallery ==
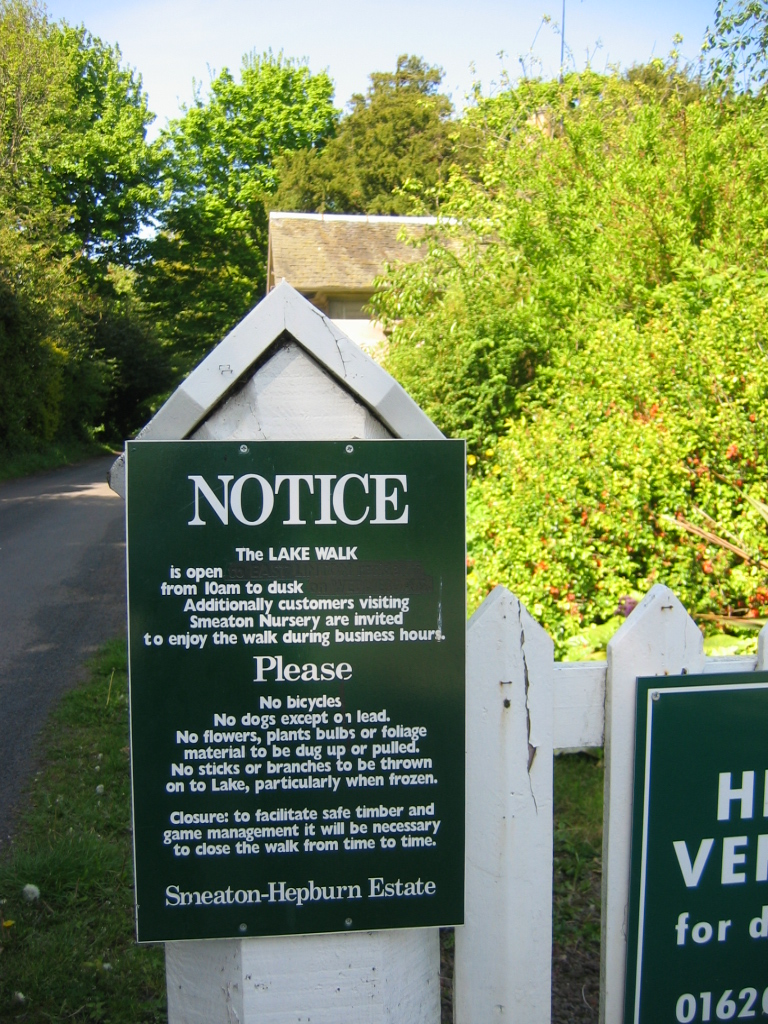
Smeaton-Hepburn Estate

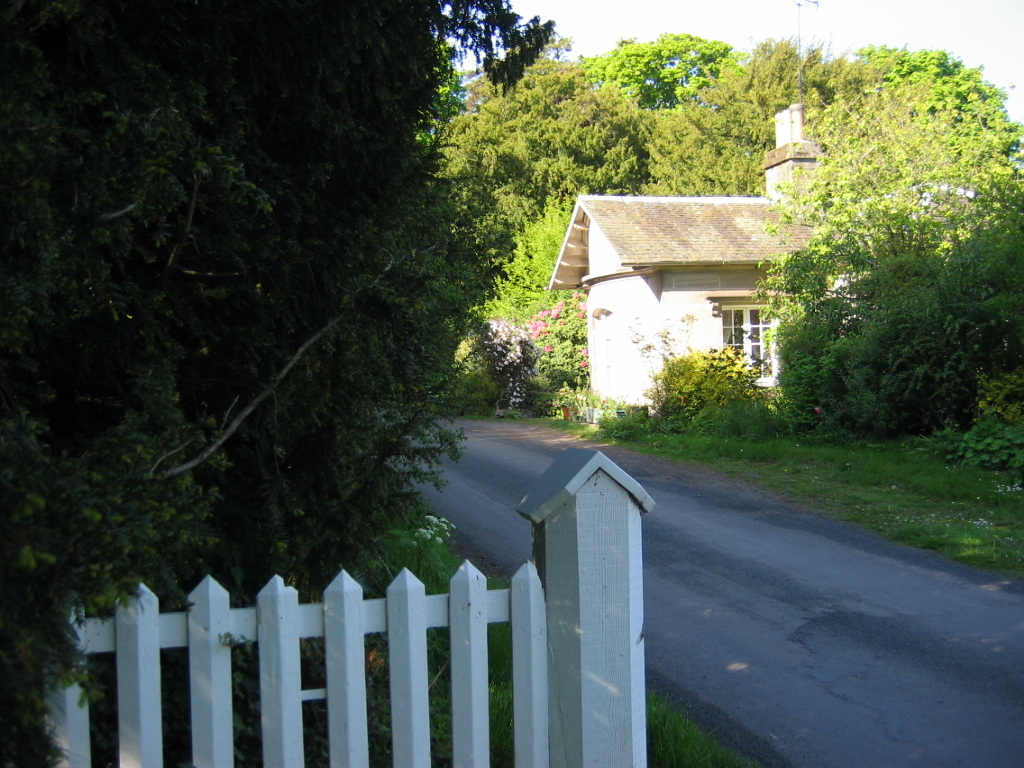
Smeaton Estate entrance lodge

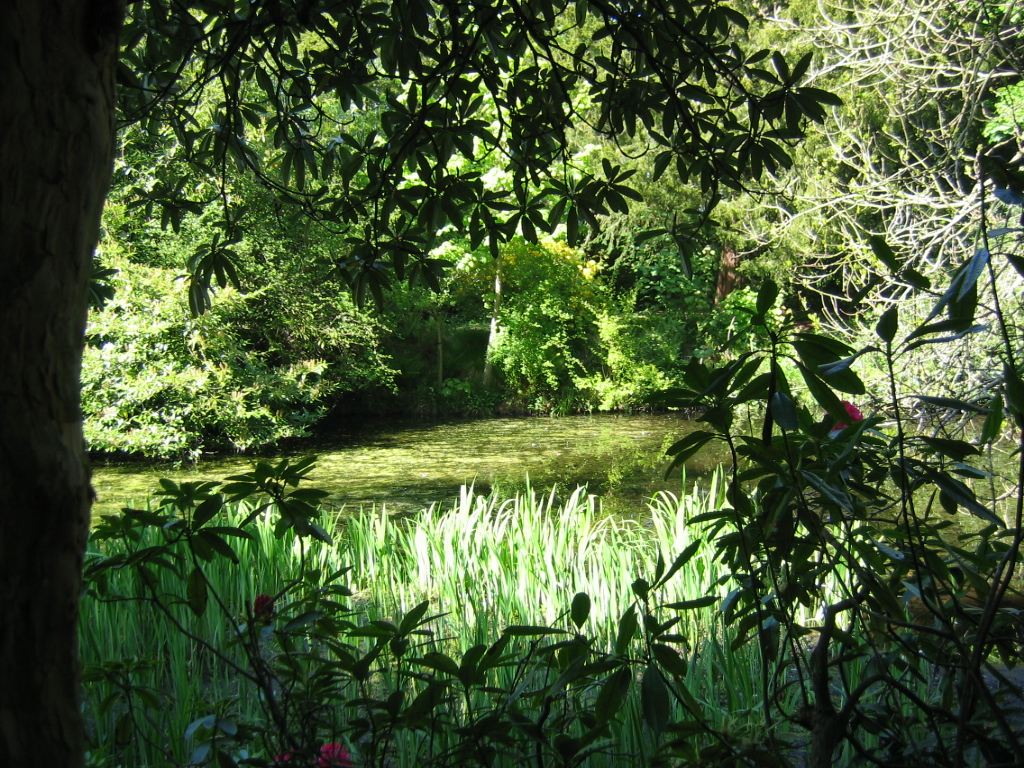
Perfect peace

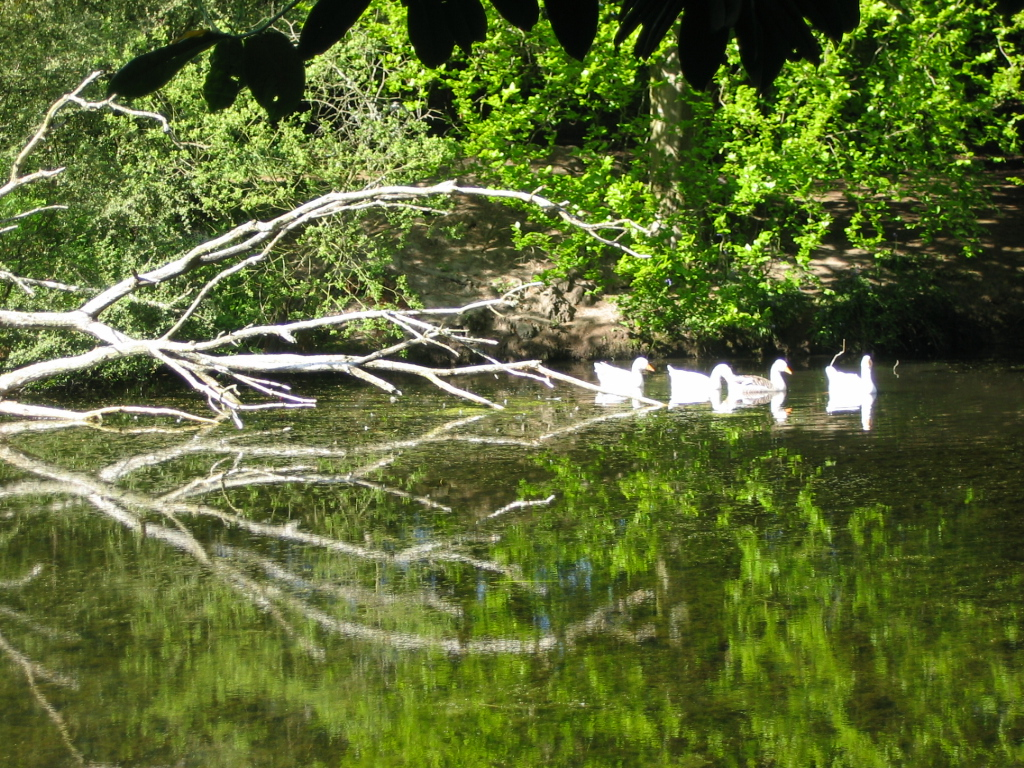
Geese on the Lake

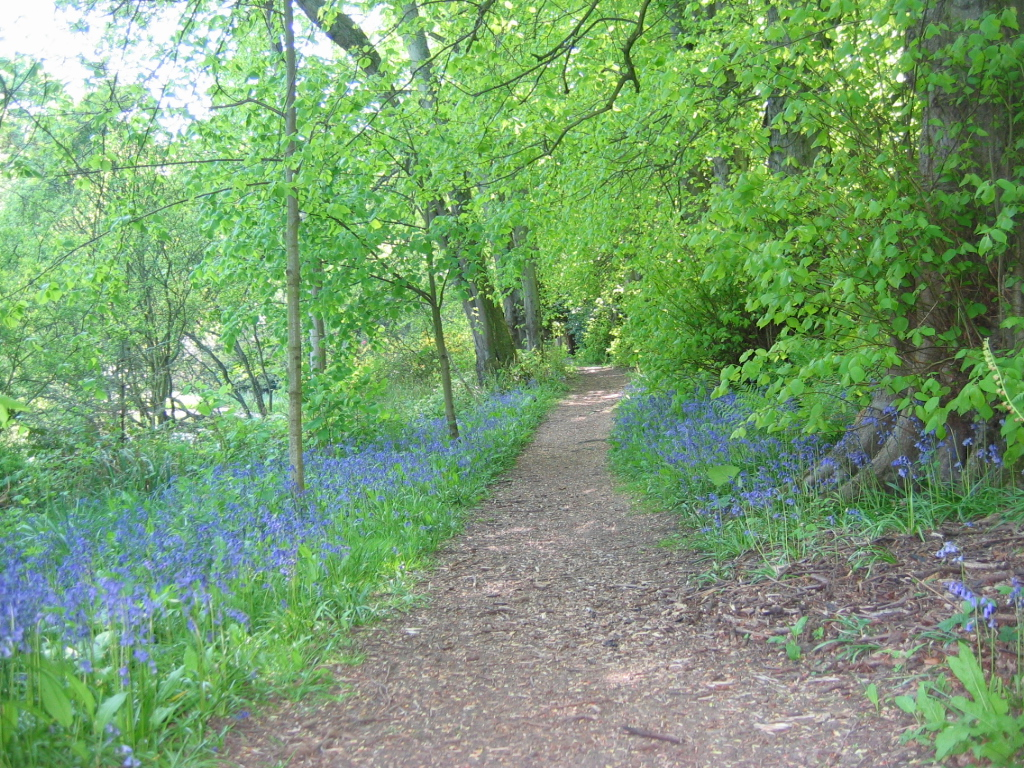
Bluebell Wood

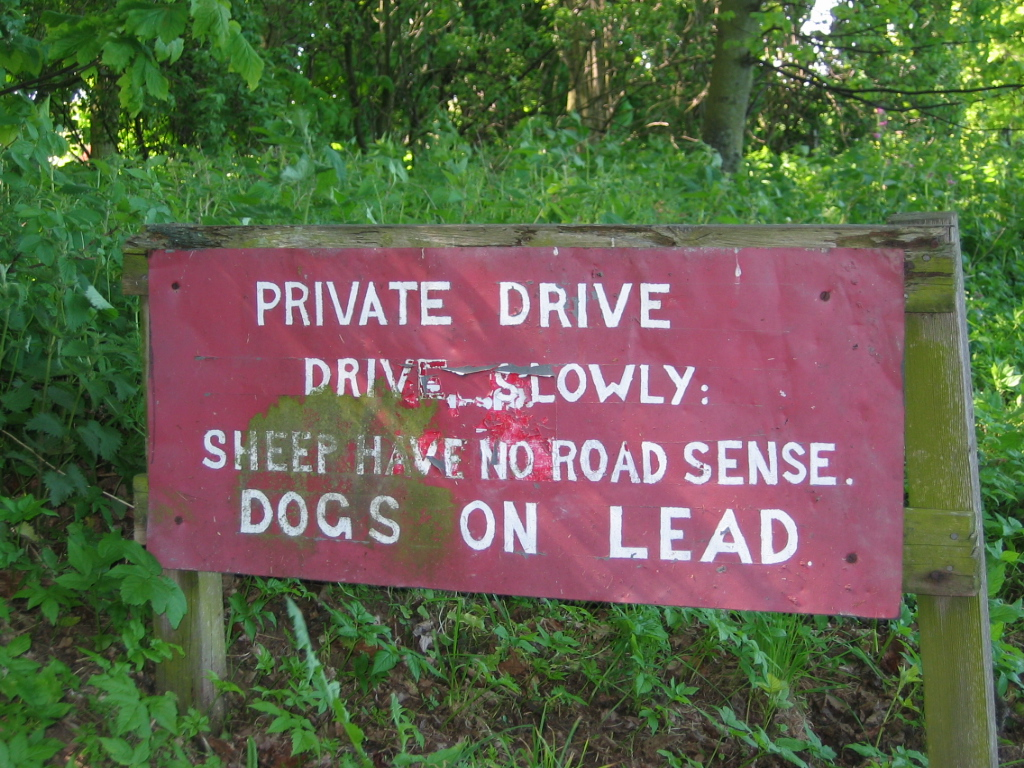
Sheep have no road sense

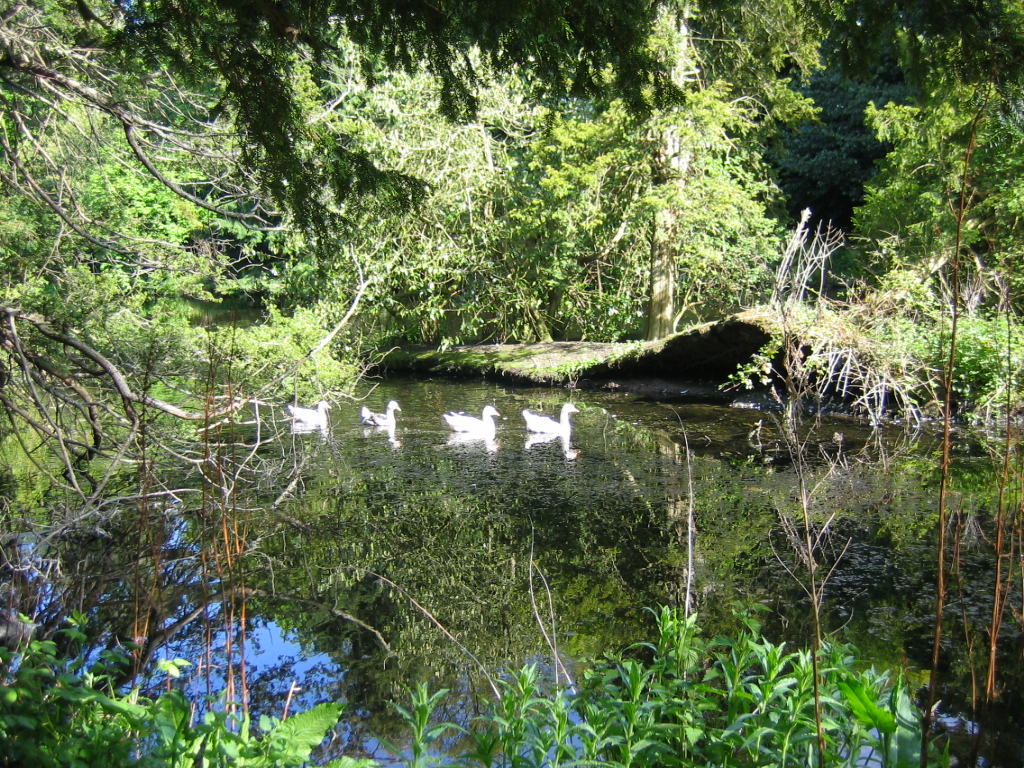
White geese

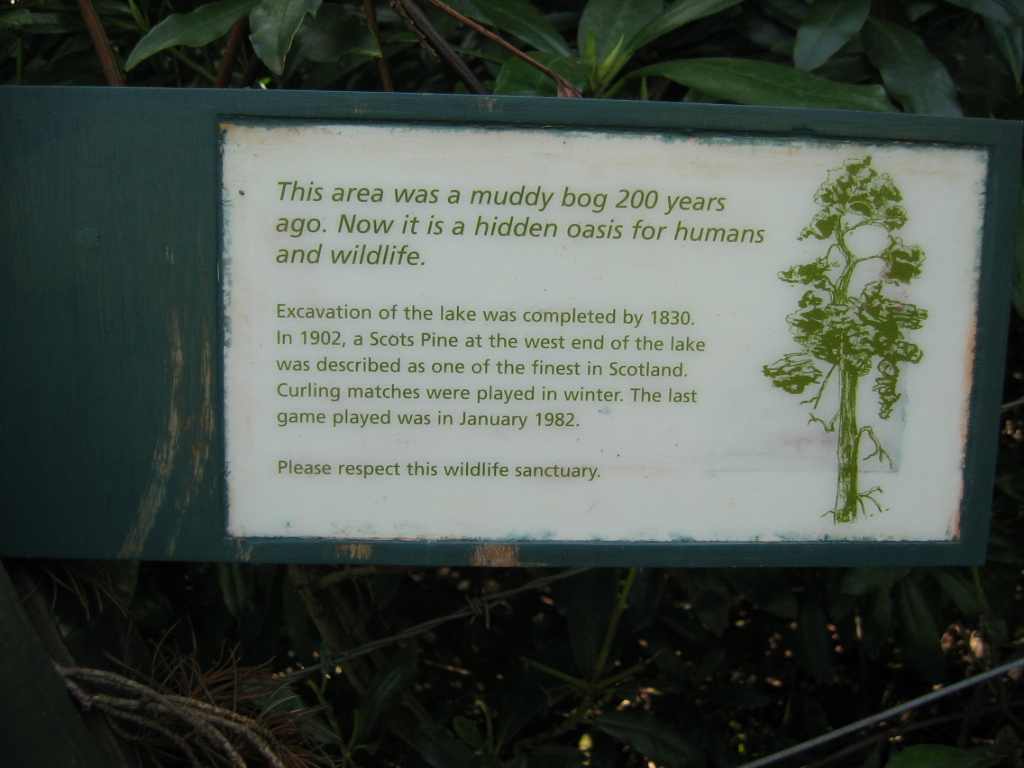
A place for wildlife

== See also ==
- List of places in East Lothian
