= Edward Marshall Hall =

British barrister (1858–1927)

Sir Edward Marshall Hall KC
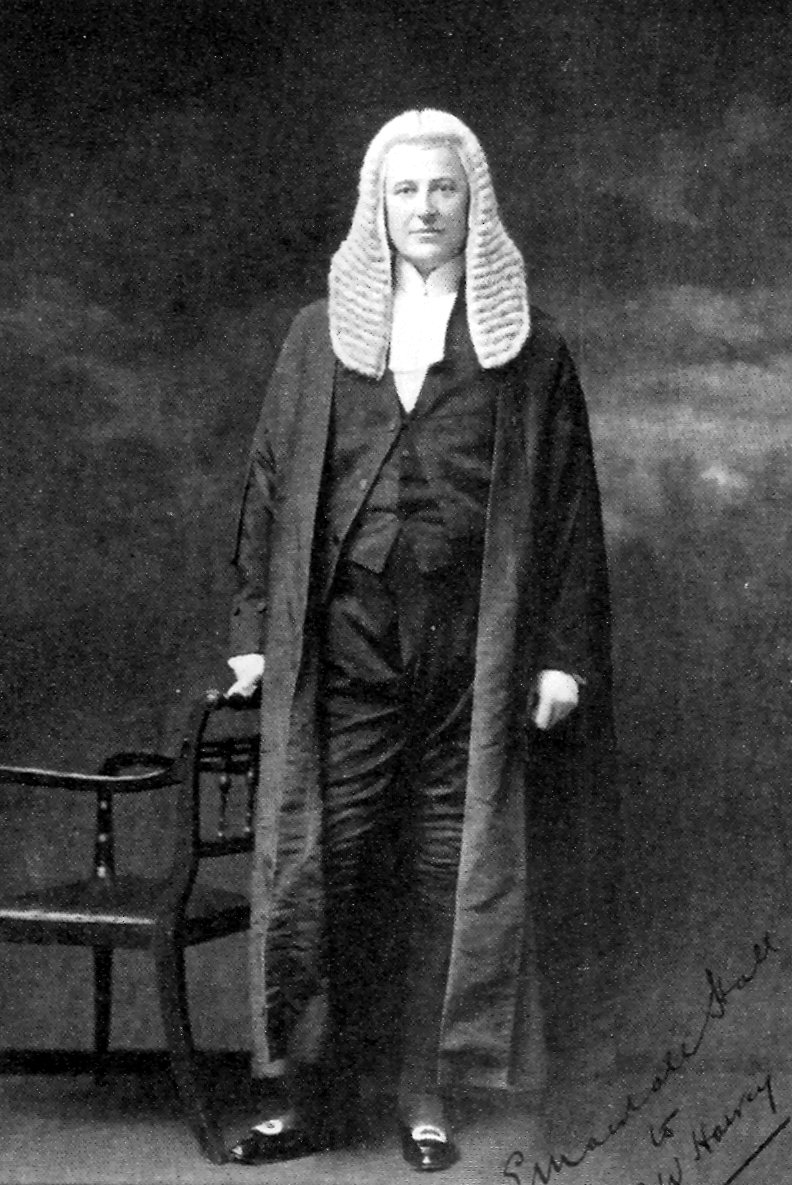
- Edward Marshall Hall in c. 1900

Member of Parliament for East Toxteth
- In office 1910–1916
- Preceded by: Austin Taylor
- Succeeded by: James Stuart Rankin

Member of Parliament for Southport
- In office 1900–1906
- Preceded by: Sir George Augustus Pilkington
- Succeeded by: John Astbury

Personal details
- Born: 16 September 1858 Brighton, England
- Died: 24 February 1927 (aged 68) London, England
- Party: Conservative (Unionist)
- Education: St John's College, Cambridge
- Occupation: Barrister, politician

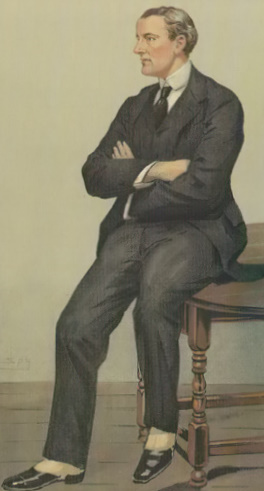
Edward Marshall Hall as drawn by 'Spy' in 1903

Sir Edward Marshall Hall, KC (16 September 1858 – 24 February 1927) was an English barrister and politician who had a formidable reputation as an orator. He successfully defended many people accused of murder and became known as "The Great Defender".

Marshall Hall practised as a barrister in the late Victorian and Edwardian eras, when the public took a great interest in the sensational court cases of the day. Big criminal and civil trials were widely reported on by the popular press on a daily basis. As a consequence, he and other successful barristers of the day became very famous. The widespread belief that he was a much better orator than a lawyer may explain his failure to achieve appointment to the High Court, which was a source of great disappointment to him.

== Personal life ==
Born in Brighton, the son of the eminent physician Alfred Hall, Marshall Hall was educated at Rugby School and St John's College, Cambridge.

As a young boy Marshall Hall was often given to mischief, which he happily recalled in an 1901 interview with T. P. O'Connor's paper: Mainly About People. Additionally, as a youth, Marshall Hall also held the record for the size of fish caught off the old chain pier at Brighton, having successfully landed a sea bass which weighed in excess of 20 lbs (9.1 kgs).

Marshall Hall did not readily excel at school. His house master at Rugby was successful in convincing his father to take him out of school and seek for him a position in the commercial trade. Despite the young Marshall Hall's protests he was taken out of Rugby and on 1 January 1877 he commenced employment with a City of London tea broker. Whilst initially resenting this, Marshall Hall was later to recall that this was a period which stood him in good stead, proving invaluable in his later profession.

He had the reputation of a keen cricketer. At this time he played for the Gentlemen of Sussex.

His time working in the commercial tea trade was brief, and in October 1877 Marshall Hall went up to Cambridge with many of his former school-mates from Rugby.

In 1879 Marshall Hall travelled to Australia, spending time in the Australian Bush and indulging his love of cricket. Having undertaken what now would be regarded as a gap year he also spent time in Paris before returning to complete his law degree.

He was admitted to the Inner Temple in 1880, called to the bar in 1883 and appointed King's Counsel in 1898.

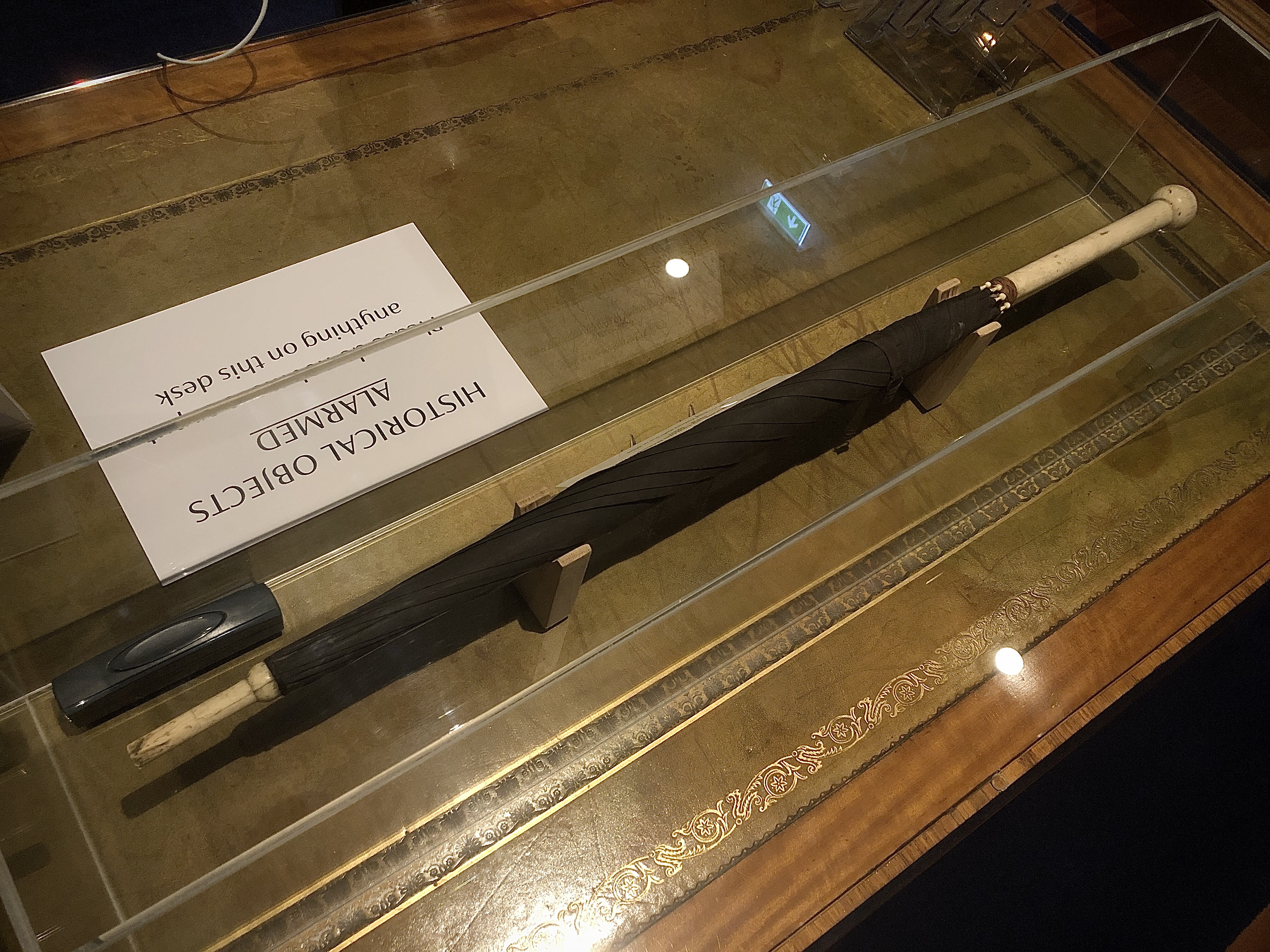
Umbrella belonging to E. M. H. at the Inner Temple, London

In 1882 he married Ethel Moon. The marriage was unhappy; the couple were never compatible and were frequently apart. They were legally separated in 1889. The next year Ethel became pregnant by a lover and died of a botched abortion; a seamy, very public lawsuit followed in which the lover, the abortionist, and several others were indicted in respect of Ethel's death. Marshall Hall's guilt over his part in Ethel's fate had a profound effect on his career: he became famous for the impassioned nature of his defences of women maltreated by men.

He subsequently married Henriette "Hetty" Kroeger, with whom he had one daughter, Elna. His elder brother was John Cressy-Hall, a first-class cricketer and merchant. His brother, despite initial business success, later lived in poverty in South Africa. Marshall Hall supported him financially, sending money to him via Archdeacon Gaul, which John resented.

== Camden Town Murder ==
In November 1907 Marshall Hall was briefed in a case which contributed to his reputation as "The Great Defender". On 12 September 1907, Bertram Shaw returned home during the evening to find his room locked. He borrowed a key from a neighbour and, upon entering, found his fiancée Emily Dimmock (known as Phyllis) lying naked on the bed, her throat cut. Nothing much had been taken from the flat, and the motive was a mystery; the case quickly became a sensation.

The police investigation, led by Inspector Neill, eventually centred on Robert Wood. Wood was in a relationship with Ruby Young, who recognised his handwriting on a postcard found in Dimmock's room. Wood was put on trial for the murder with Marshall Hall as his defence counsel. Marshall Hall, along with his junior Wellesley Orr, had reservations about Wood giving evidence. This concern was realised when Marshall Hall commenced his examination in chief with: "Robert Wood, did you kill Emily Dimmock?" Wood remained silent, forcing Marshall Hall to repeat the question. Wood then answered, "I mean, it's ridiculous."; a response which risked antagonising the jury. Despite Wood's poor performance as a witness, including cross-examination from senior Treasury Counsel, Sir Charles Mathews, Marshall Hall impressed the court with his rigorous cross-examination of witnesses and convincing oratory style. His closing statement was reported to have been so persuasive that a juror apparently fainted during its conclusion. Mr Justice Grantham, mid-summing up, departed from the pro-conviction stance he was expected to take and made it clear he thought the jury should acquit. They did so after retiring for only 15 minutes between 7.45 and 8pm.

Marshall Hall's spirited defence had persuaded almost all in the court of Wood's innocence and caused a large crowd to gather outside the Old Bailey. The huge cheer that went up in courtroom number one was repeated outside. Performances in London theatres were stopped for the verdict to be announced, one announcement was delivered from the stage by Mrs Beerbohm Tree who had been a spectator in the court.

== Green bicycle case ==
One of the most famous cases was R v Light, known as the Green Bicycle Case, which took place near Leicester in 1919. Marshall Hall obtained an acquittal, despite what seemed like overwhelming circumstantial evidence against the defendant. This evidence included: the fact that the defendant, Ronald Light, had been seen cycling with the victim, Bella Wright, on the day of her death, on a green bicycle; had possessed at one time a revolver similar to the one used to fire the shot that killed her; had discarded that green bicycle in the canal after filing off all of the identifying numbers; and had thrown away a holster and ammunition for the type of revolver used in the murder. He also lied to the police. A full transcript of the evidence and submissions of counsel does not appear to have survived, but from what remains of the closing speech of Marshall Hall, he took advantage of the Crown's lack of a case theory to take their case to its logical conclusion and then demolish it. He submitted that the prosecution case only held together if the entire murder was premeditated. It was the prosecution evidence, indeed the hearsay evidence of the dead victim, that Ronald Light was not known to Bella Wright. How could he then have planned her murder? Marshall Hall used this, and many other points to persuade the jury that they could not be sure that Light was the murderer. The jury returned a unanimous verdict of not guilty after a little over three hours.

== Other cases ==
In 1894 he defended the Austrian-born prostitute Marie Hermann, charged with the murder of a client; Marshall Hall persuaded the jury that it was a case of manslaughter. Although he made full use of his forensic skills, the case is best remembered for his emotional plea to the jury: "Look at her, gentlemen... God never gave her a chance - won't you?"

In 1901 he unsuccessfully defended Herbert John Bennett in the Yarmouth Beach case. Bennett was charged with strangling his wife, Mary, in order to marry Alice Meadows. At a late stage in the trial, Marshall Hall dramatically produced an alibi witness, Sholto Douglas, who testified that on the day of the murder he had met Bennett in Bexley, after the last train for Yarmouth had departed. Douglas was clearly a truthful witness but he had never met Bennett before the date of the murder and the prosecution easily convinced the jury that he had made an honest mistake (which was also Marshall Hall's private opinion). The defence was weakened by the absence of any other suspect or motive, and by the fact that Bennett was such an obvious liar that he could not safely be put into the witness box. Marshall Hall, despite the overwhelming evidence, was never entirely sure of Bennett's guilt.

Marshall Hall was also given the brief to represent Dr Crippen at his trial in 1910. However, Crippen provided instructions that Marshall Hall did not feel comfortable with; Crippen would not adopt the line of defence that Marshall Hall felt represented the truth of the matter. As a result, Marshall Hall returned the brief and other counsel appeared at Crippen's trial at the Old Bailey. Arthur Newton instructed Marshall Hall on this occasion as he often did.

Marshall Hall defended Frederick Seddon unsuccessfully in a notorious poisoning case in 1912. Seddon was hanged in 1912 for murdering Elizabeth Mary Barrow by administering large quantities of arsenic. Marshall Hall's challenge to the medical evidence, though showing an impressive grasp of the subject, was unsuccessful. Seddon, rather against counsel's wishes, insisted on giving evidence, and made a very bad impression. His manner struck observers as cold and unfeeling, and his obvious greed weakened the defence that the money he gained from Miss Barrow's death was not enough to tempt him to murder. Marshall Hall in later years said that Seddon would have been acquitted if he had not insisted on giving evidence.

Marshall Hall also defended George Joseph Smith the "Brides-in-the-Bath" murderer in 1915. Smith was tried for the first of three identical murders of his recent brides, all of whom were drowned while having baths. Despite a spirited defence by Marshall Hall, Smith was convicted and hanged, again largely due to key evidence from Sir Bernard Spilsbury. The case however does seem to contradict the widespread view that he was "not much of a lawyer"—rather he disliked legal argument but could make a good one if necessary.

Marshall Hall successfully defended solicitor Harold Greenwood at Carmarthen Assizes in 1920. Greenwood had been accused of poisoning his wife with arsenic. Marshall Hall's skilful cross-examination of the medical witnesses raised, at least, the possibility that Mrs. Greenwood had died from an accidental overdose of morphine. His closing speech for the defence was described by Gerald Sparrow as "the finest ever heard at the English bar", the more impressive since Marshall Hall was seriously ill at the time.

In December 1920 Marshall Hall represented William Gray, one of the two defendants in the Crumbles murder. Gray and Jack Field, defended by J. D. Cassels, were accused of beating 17-year-old Irene Munro to death during a robbery. On cross-examination Marshall Hall succeeded in getting Dr. Cadman, who had performed the victim's autopsy, to admit that his initial examination had led him to believe that the victim could not have been killed before 11:00 p.m., by which time Gray and Field had left her and returned alone to Eastbourne. However, two other medical witnesses disagreed with this analysis and testified that Munro had died between Gray and Field leaving with her and returning alone. Both Gray and Field were convicted and hanged.

More successful was the defence Marshall Hall gave to Madame (or Princess) Marguerite Fahmy in 1923 for the shooting death of her husband, Egyptian Prince Fahmy Bey at London's Savoy Hotel. The death of the Prince is frequently on lists of victims of the so-called Curse of the Pharaohs. Marshall Hall brought out Prince Fahmy's race and sexual habits, painting the victim as an evil-minded foreigner who threatened a "white woman" for sexual reasons, whereupon she defended herself. The jury accepted this and acquitted Madame Fahmy. The Egyptian ambassador wrote several angry letters to the newspapers criticizing Marshall Hall's blackening of the victim and Egyptians in general. In his 2013 book The Prince, The Princess and the Perfect Murder (published in the US as The Woman Before Wallis) Andrew Rose revealed that Madame Fahmy, real name Marguerite Alibert, a Frenchwoman of modest birth, had an 18-month long affair with the Prince of Wales, the future Edward VIII, in Paris towards the end of World War I. Desperate efforts were made by the Royal Household to ensure that the Prince's name was not mentioned at her trial, which may have contributed to her acquittal.

In July 1924, Marshall Hall made a rare appearance for the prosecution, with the Attorney General Sir Patrick Hastings leading at Guildford Assizes before Mr Justice Avory against Jean-Pierre Vaquier for poisoning his lover's husband. Vaquier was found guilty and hanged by Robert Baxter.

== Political career ==
As well as being elevated to King's Counsel, Marshall Hall served twice in Parliament as a Unionist Member of Parliament for Southport (1900–1906) and for Liverpool East Toxteth (1910–1916). To the great disappointment of the public, he rarely spoke in the House of Commons, and such speeches did not compare with his courtroom oratory.

== Legacy ==
Edward Marshall Hall was born and lived at 30 Old Steine, Brighton where there is a commemorative stone plaque on the wall. The building today houses one of Brighton's oldest established firms of solicitors, Burt Brill and Cardens, and remains largely unchanged externally and internally. Brighton & Hove have named a bus after him.

The County Borough of Southport named Hall Street after him in his honour. In his day, Marshall Hall made and lost many a fortune and was alternately impecunious or well in funds. When he died, he was in funds and left a considerable sum of money in a trust to be administered by Inner Temple for the benefit of young barristers starting out on their careers and who were as impecunious as he had been from time to time. The fund continues to this day.

In 1980, Marshall Hall was portrayed by Robert Stephens in an episode of the Granada Television series Lady Killers, which covered the case of Princess Fahmy. In the second series he was played by Michael Byrne in two episodes. Marshall Hall's career was dramatised in an 8-episode 1989 BBC Two television serial by Richard Cooper, Shadow of the Noose, starring Jonathan Hyde in the lead role and Terry Taplin as Arthur Newton, the leading solicitor who often secured Marshall Hall's services.

John Mortimer, creator of Rumpole of the Bailey, presented some of Marshall Hall's cases in a 5-part 1996 radio series, starring Tom Baker as Marshall Hall. Hall was a famous wit and, in the case of an Irish labourer, when asked by a rather pompous judge, "Is your client not familiar with the maxim res ipsa loquitur?” replied, "My lord, on the remote hillside in County Donegal where my client hails from, they talk of little else".

== Sources ==
- Edward Marjoribanks, The Life of Sir Edward Marshall Hall, Victor Gollancz Ltd, London 1929.
- Edward Marjoribanks, Famous Trials of Marshall Hall, Penguin, 1989. ISBN 0-14-011556-0
- Nina Warner Hooke & Gil Thomas, Marshall Hall, Arthur Barker, London 1966.
- Sally Smith, Marshall Hall: A Law Unto Himself, Wildy Simmons & Hill Publishing, London 2016. ISBN 978 0 85490 187 6.

Parliament of the United Kingdom
Preceded by George Augustus Pilkington	Member of Parliament for Southport; 1900–1906	Succeeded by John Meir Astbury
Preceded by Austin Taylor	Member of Parliament for Liverpool East Toxteth; Jan. 1910–1916	Succeeded by James Stuart Rankin
