= Liverpool East Toxteth =

Parliamentary constituency in the United Kingdom, 1885–1950

- Former borough constituency for the House of Commons

1885–1950
- Seats: one
- Created from: Liverpool
- Replaced by: Liverpool Toxteth, Liverpool Garston and Liverpool Exchange

Liverpool East Toxteth was a borough constituency represented in the House of Commons of the Parliament of the United Kingdom. It elected one Member of Parliament (MP) by the first past the post system of election.

== Boundaries ==
1885–1918: Part of the civil parish of Toxteth.

1918–1950: The County Borough of Liverpool wards of Aigburth, Granby, Sefton Park East, and Sefton Park West.

== Members of Parliament ==
Year	Member	Party
1885	Henry de Worms	Conservative
1895	Augustus Frederick Warr	Conservative
1902	Austin Taylor	Conservative
1906	Austin Taylor	Liberal
1910	Edward Marshall Hall	Conservative
1916	James Stuart Rankin	Conservative
1924	Albert Jacob	Unionist
1929	Henry Mond	Conservative
1931	Patrick Buchan-Hepburn	Conservative
1950	constituency abolished	

== Elections ==
=== Elections in the 1880s ===
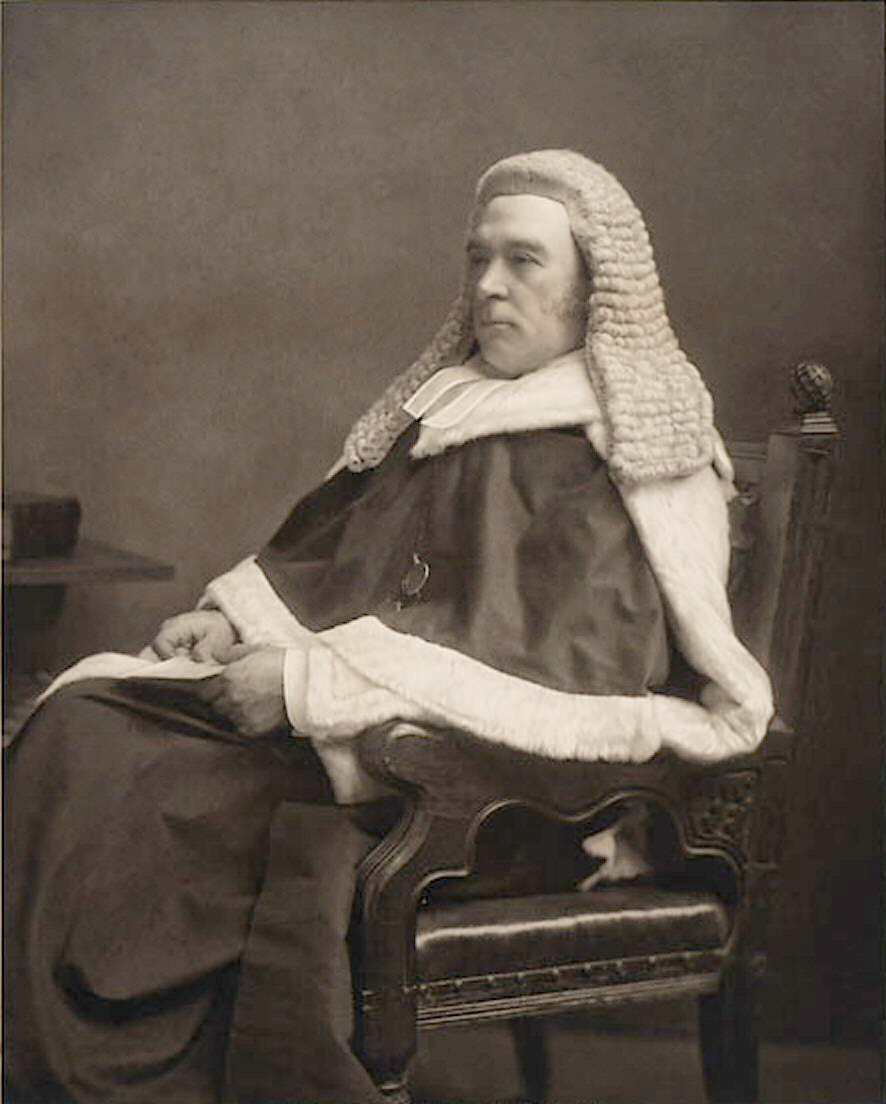
Bigham

General election 1885: Liverpool East Toxteth
Party	Candidate	Votes	%	±%
Conservative	Henry de Worms	3,598	58.0	
Liberal	John Bigham	2,608	42.0	
Majority		990	16.0	
Turnout		6,206	77.5	
Registered electors		8,003		
Conservative win (new seat)				

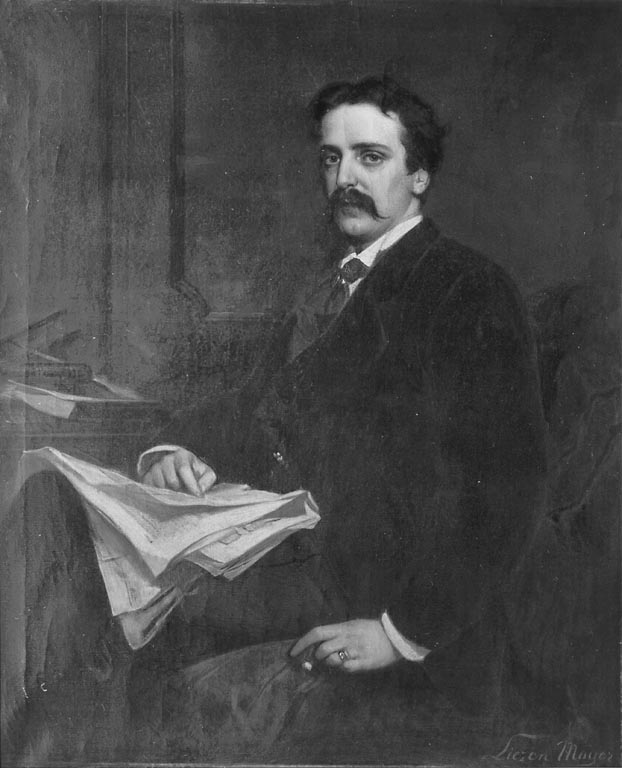
de Worms

General election 1886: Liverpool East Toxteth
Party	Candidate	Votes	%	±%
Conservative	Henry de Worms	Unopposed		
Conservative hold				

=== Elections in the 1890s ===
General election 1892: Liverpool East Toxteth
Party	Candidate	Votes	%	±%
Conservative	Henry de Worms	3,708	62.8	N/A
Liberal	Edward Paull	2,201	37.2	New
Majority		1,507	25.6	N/A
Turnout		5,909	69.2	N/A
Registered electors		8,544		
Conservative hold		Swing	N/A	

General election 1895: Liverpool East Toxteth
Party	Candidate	Votes	%	±%
Conservative	Henry de Worms	3,628	68.0	+5.2
Liberal	Climenson Yelverton Charles Dawbarn	1,706	32.0	−5.2
Majority		1,922	36.0	+10.4
Turnout		5,334	61.8	−7.4
Registered electors		8,627		
Conservative hold		Swing	+5.2	

1895 Liverpool East Toxteth by-election
Party	Candidate	Votes	%	±%
Conservative	Augustus Frederick Warr	Unopposed		
Conservative hold				

=== Elections in the 1900s ===
General election 1900: Liverpool East Toxteth
Party	Candidate	Votes	%	±%
Conservative	Augustus Frederick Warr	Unopposed		
Conservative hold				

1902 Liverpool East Toxteth by-election
Party	Candidate	Votes	%	±%
Conservative	Austin Taylor	3,610	52.8	N/A
Liberal	Herbert R. Rathbone	3,233	47.2	New
Majority		377	5.6	N/A
Turnout		6,843	72.1	N/A
Registered electors		9,485		
Conservative hold		Swing	N/A	

General election 1906: Liverpool East Toxteth
Party	Candidate	Votes	%	±%
Conservative	Austin Taylor	Unopposed		
Conservative hold				

=== Elections in the 1910s ===
General election January 1910: Liverpool East Toxteth
Party	Candidate	Votes	%	±%
Conservative	Edward Marshall Hall	4,037	51.8	N/A
Liberal	John Lea	3,752	48.2	New
Majority		285	3.6	N/A
Turnout		7,789	81.9	N/A
Conservative hold		Swing	N/A	

General election December 1910: Liverpool East Toxteth
Party	Candidate	Votes	%	±%
Conservative	Edward Marshall Hall	4,087	56.7	+4.9
Liberal	Clive Bigham	3,121	43.3	−4.9
Majority		966	13.4	+9.8
Turnout		7,206	75.8	−6.1
Conservative hold		Swing	+4.9	

General Election 1914–15:

Another General Election was required to take place before the end of 1915. The political parties had been making preparations for an election to take place and by July 1914, the following candidates had been selected;

- Unionist: James Stuart Rankin
- Liberal: John Lea

1916 Liverpool East Toxteth by-election
Party	Candidate	Votes	%	±%
Unionist	James Stuart Rankin	Unopposed		
Unionist hold				

General election 1918: Liverpool East Toxteth
Party		Candidate	Votes	%	±%
C	Unionist	James Stuart Rankin	Unopposed		
	Unionist hold				
C indicates candidate endorsed by the coalition government.

=== Elections in the 1920s ===
Rathbone

General election 1922: Liverpool East Toxteth
Party	Candidate	Votes	%	±%
Unionist	James Stuart Rankin	15,149	60.3	N/A
Independent	Eleanor Rathbone*	9,984	39.7	New
Majority		5,165	20.6	N/A
Turnout		25,133	74.2	N/A
Unionist hold		Swing	N/A	

* Rathbone was a member of Liverpool City Council at the time of the election, and received support from the local Liberal association and the Women's Citizenship Association.

1923 general election: Liverpool East Toxteth
Party	Candidate	Votes	%	±%
Unionist	James Stuart Rankin	Unopposed	N/A	N/A
Unionist hold				

1924 general election: Liverpool East Toxteth
Party	Candidate	Votes	%	±%
Unionist	Albert Jacob	16,139	59.9	N/A
Labour	Charles Burden	6,620	24.6	New
Liberal	Frederick Bowring	4,163	15.5	New
Majority		9,519	35.3	N/A
Turnout		26,922	76.4	N/A
Unionist hold		Swing	N/A	

1929 Liverpool East Toxteth by-election
Party	Candidate	Votes	%	±%
Unionist	Henry Mond	9,462	43.2	−16.7
Labour	Joseph Cleary	6,563	29.2	+4.6
Liberal	Aled Roberts	6,206	27.6	+12.1
Majority		3,129	14.0	−19.3
Turnout		22,231	61.7	−14.7
Unionist hold		Swing	-10.7	

General election 1929: Liverpool East Toxteth
Party	Candidate	Votes	%	±%
Unionist	Henry Mond	17,678	47.9	+4.7
Labour	Joseph Cleary	9,904	26.9	−2.3
Liberal	Aled Roberts	9,287	25.2	−2.4
Majority		7,774	21.0	+7.0
Turnout		36,869	75.5	+13.8
Unionist hold		Swing	+4.5	

=== Elections in the 1930s ===
1931 Liverpool East Toxteth by-election
Party	Candidate	Votes	%	±%
Conservative	Patrick Buchan-Hepburn	17,040	75.4	+27.5
Labour	Charles Burden	5,550	24.6	―2.3
Majority		11,490	50.8	+29.8
Turnout		22,590	45.6	―29.9
Conservative hold		Swing	+14.9	

General election 1931: Liverpool East Toxteth
Party	Candidate	Votes	%	±%
Conservative	Patrick Buchan-Hepburn	28,187	75.6	+0.2
Liberal	Alfred Samuel Doran	9,093	24.4	New
Majority		19,094	51.2	+0.4
Turnout		37,280	74.0	+28.4
Conservative hold		Swing		

General election 1935: Liverpool East Toxteth
Party	Candidate	Votes	%	±%
Conservative	Patrick Buchan-Hepburn	20,638	60.2	―15.4
Liberal	Arthur Donald Dennis	13,622	39.8	+15.4
Majority		7,016	20.4	―30.8
Turnout		34,260	65.2	―8.8
Conservative hold		Swing	―15.4	

General Election 1939–40

Another General Election was required to take place before the end of 1940. The political parties had been making preparations for an election to take place and by the Autumn of 1939, the following candidates had been selected;

- Conservative: Patrick Buchan-Hepburn
- Liberal: Lyon Blease

=== Elections in the 1940s ===
General election 1945: Liverpool East Toxteth
Party	Candidate	Votes	%	±%
Conservative	Patrick Buchan-Hepburn	18,145	49.3	―10.9
Labour	Victor Harold Edgar Baker	12,376	33.6	New
Liberal	Lyon Blease	6,286	17.1	―22.7
Majority		5,769	15.7	―4.7
Turnout		36,807	70.1	+4.9
Conservative hold		Swing		
