= 1931 Liverpool East Toxteth by-election =

UK Parliamentary by-election

The 1931 Liverpool East Toxteth by-election was held on 5 February 1931. The by-election was held due to the succession to the peerage of the incumbent Conservative MP, Henry Mond. It was won by the Conservative candidate Patrick Buchan-Hepburn. Mond, a former Liberal had won the seat for the Conservatives at a by-election in 1929 and had held it with an increased at the 1929 general election a few weeks later. Buchan-Hepburn had previously served on the London County Council and as a private secretary to Winston Churchill.

== Result ==
Liverpool East Toxteth by-election, 5 February 1931
Party	Candidate	Votes	%	±%
Conservative	Patrick Buchan-Hepburn	17,040	75.4	+27.5
Labour	Charles Burden	5,550	24.6	−2.3
Majority		11,490	50.8	+29.8
Turnout		22,590	45.6	−29.9
Registered electors		49,518		
Conservative hold		Swing	+14.9	

== Aftermath ==
At the general election later in the year Patrick Buchan-Hepburn scored an even greater victory, defeating a Liberal by over 19,000 votes. On that occasion, Labour did not field a candidate.
