= 1902 Liverpool East Toxteth by-election =

UK Parliamentary by-election

The 1902 Liverpool East Toxteth by-election was held on 6 November 1902 after the resignation of the Conservative MP Augustus Frederick Warr. The seat was retained by the Conservative candidate Austin Taylor.

== Vacancy ==
The by-election in East Toxteth was caused by the resignation on 27 October 1902 of the sitting Conservative MP, Augustus Frederick Warr. Warr was a solicitor who had held the seat since he was elected unopposed in a by-election in 1895. He was re-elected unopposed in the general election in 1900, but found that the increasing workload of Parliament was incompatible with his legal work in Liverpool and his wife's long-term illness. He resigned his seat on 27 October 1902 by the procedural device of accepting appointment as Steward of the Chiltern Hundreds, triggering the by-election.

== Candidates ==
The Conservative party discussed several possible candidates, and at a meeting of the local party on 27 October selected as candidate Austin Taylor, head of the steamship company of Messrs. Hugh Evans and Co. Taylor was a prominent member of the Liverpool City Council and Chairman of the Laymen's League.

The selection was somewhat controversial among local members, and Peter McGuffie, another Conservative city councillor, was approached to contest the division as an Independent Conservative, but declined in a letter to newspapers printed 29 October.

The Liberal party candidate was Herbert Rathbone, a city councillor of Liverpool and nephew of recently deceased Liberal MP William Rathbone (1819–1902).

== Issues ==
Education
Following the successful campaign in the Leeds North by-election in July 1902, the Liberal party spent much time on the government's plans for an Education Bill to replace school boards with local education authorities, which included proposals to bring church schools into the public system. Many Liberals were strongly nonconformist and the idea that Church of England and Roman Catholic schools should be funded from the rates, a form of local taxation, was anathema to them. It provided the battle slogan ‘Rome on the Rates’ and united the party against the government. The bill was debated in the House as the campaign in East Toxteth took place. Rathbone ″strongly denounced″ the bill, whereas Taylor said he would assist in passing the amended version.

Ireland
Taylor spoke out as a stanch opponent of Home Rule for Ireland, while Rathbone argued for devolution which would ″satisfy the reasonable aspiration of the Irish people and at the same time add to the efficiency of the Imperial Parliament″.

Other issues
Taylor advanced the government's naval policy, highlighting the ″duty of the nation at all costs see to it that the high roads of the sea was kept open for the safe passage of our ships and the safe transport to our shores of the means of sustenance for the population.″

== Result ==
The election result was announced on the evening of November 6, with the Conservative candidate Austin Taylor the winner. The fairly close race in a Conservative district was explained by local causes (the split among conservatives), and not as another Liberal win (they had won another by-election on the previous day).

Liverpool East Toxteth by-election, 1902
Party	Candidate	Votes	%	±%
Conservative	Austin Taylor	3,610	52.8	N/A
Liberal	Herbert R. Rathbone	3,233	47.2	New
Majority		377	5.6	N/A
Turnout		6,843	72.1	N/A
Conservative hold		Swing	N/A	

Austin was re-elected unopposed in the 1906 general election, but later the same year resigned the Conservative whip and joined the Liberal party.
