= West India Committee =

- Predecessor: The London Society of West India Planters and Merchants
- Formation: 1735; 291 years ago
- Type: NGO
- Website: www.westindiacommittee.org

The West India Committee is a British-based organisation promoting ties and trade with the Caribbean. It operates as a UK-registered charity and NGO (non-governmental organisation) "whose object is to promote the interests of agriculture, manufacturing industries and trade of the West Indies, Belize and Guyana and thus increase the general welfare of those territories [and their people globally] through [delivering] education, training, acting as an advocate, adviser and where necessary, as an umbrella organisation". It evolved out of a lobbying group first formed in the City of London circa 1735 to protest to King George II about Jamaican trading practices.

Historically, the principal commodities of the region were cane sugar, rum, mahogany, other softwood, spices and tropical produce, early on largely confined to types that would last a long transatlantic voyage such as coffee, nuts and desiccated coconut but later expanded to include tropical fruits in general.

The organisation describes itself as "the oldest body representative of the Commonwealth."

The West India Committee was originally known as The London Society of West India Planters and Merchants, established to represent the views of those engaged in the trade with the Caribbean that held a diverse range of views on the region, ranging from London-based merchants to British West Indian planters, including both pro and anti-abolitionists.

The society became a permanent body in 1775, as a reaction to the impending outbreak of the American Revolutionary War and the threat that the war posed to the economy of the Caribbean. The society started with a predominantly Jamaican leadership, but as emancipation approached, by the 1830s the leadership came to include a broader ranger of planter interests from across the British Caribbean.

Following the abolition of slavery, the society evolved into the West India Committee, a modern charity whose central mission is to improve the general welfare of the peoples of the Caribbean and the societies in which they live, work and study in order to improve social mobility and social cohesion. It was one of the first charities registered under the Charities Act 1960 and has regularly tackled the impact of climate change in the region through its disaster relief work and has addressed the adverse impact of the Windrush Scandal on those affected, including successfully lobbying the Home Office for interim compensation payments to be made to victims. Throughout its history, the West India Committee has supported West Indian servicemen and women and was instrumental in the founding of the British West Indies Regiment in 1915. Further milestones in the history of the West India Committee include sending Captain Bligh on HMS Bounty to introduce new foodstuffs to the Caribbean, reducing dependence on mainland America at the time of the American Revolutionary War; and establishing the Thames River Police to protect West Indian goods on the River Thames, thereby introducing preventative policing to the world and establishing the world's oldest continuously serving police force.

== West India Committee ==
In 1904, the committee received a royal charter of incorporation at the initiative of the British government. It later acquired charitable status and established two subsidiary bodies:

- The Caribbean Council for Europe (CCE)
- The Caribbean Trade Advisory Group (Caritag).

== The modern organisation ==
The West India Committee exists to promote and support agriculture, manufacturing, and trade in the West Indies, Guyana and Belize, "to increase the general welfare of the people of those territories and their global diaspora through education, training, acting as an advocate, adviser and where necessary, as an umbrella organisation". It is a consulting NGO of UNESCO on Caribbean heritage and small island developing nations.

== Notable officers ==
From at least 1915 until 1929, its Secretary was Algernon Aspinall, who, in the name of the committee, published geographical guides to Guyana and the British Caribbean, such as Stanford's Guide: Pocket Guide to the West Indies (published between 1905 and the 1970s) and The Handbook of the British West Indies, British Guiana and British Honduras (1929).

Sir Eliot de Pass, father of Victoria Cross recipient Alexander de Pass, served first as an ordinary member of the committee, then as its chairman from 1925 to 1936, and finally as president until his death the following year.

Sir Sonny Ramphal, longest serving Secretary General of the Commonwealth, also served as chairman of the committee.

== Library and archive ==
The Committee's library and archive are inscribed by UNESCO on its Memory of the World international register, recognising its global importance. The library now resides in London and is accessible to the public and online, whilst many of the committee's minute books were purchased by the government of Trinidad and Tobago and are currently held at the Alma Jordan Library, at the University of the West Indies, St. Augustine.

== Sources ==
Hall, Douglas (1971). A Brief History of the West India Committee. Caribbean Universities Press. ISBN 0-85474-000-7.
