= Alma Jordan Library =

Library at the University of the West Indies in Saint Augustine, Trinidad and Tobago

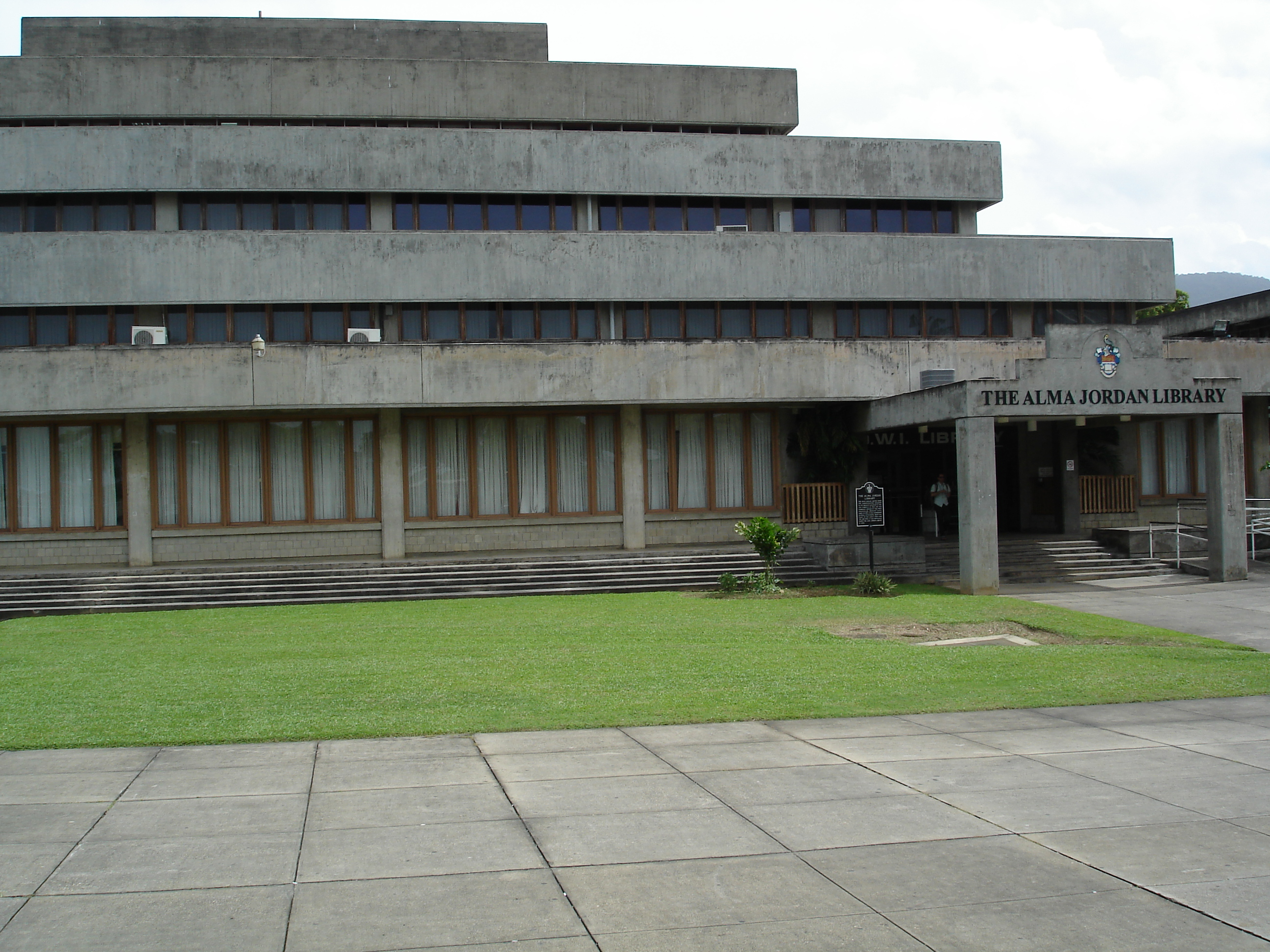
- 10.639659275306611°N 61.399018493491425°W
- Location: Saint Augustine, Trinidad and Tobago, Trinidad and Tobago
- Type: Academic library
- Established: 1962

Other information
- Website: www.mainlib.uwi.tt

The Alma Jordan Library at the University of the West Indies (UWI), Trinidad and Tobago, was named after UWI librarian Alma Jordan in 2010 or 2011. The four-storied library is located on the St. Augustine Campus of the UWI. It is the largest of the libraries in the St Augustine Campus libraries network, with approximately 600,000 monographs, 31,000 e-books, 4,000 serial titles, 57,000 e-journal subscriptions and access to over 200 databases.

The Alma Jordan Library houses the Eric Williams Memorial Collection, which has been named to the UNESCO Memory of the World Register.

The library houses the minute books of the London Society of West India Planters and Merchants, a major anti-abolitionist organisation of the British West Indian plantocracy.

Other libraries in the St Augustine Campus Libraries network include the Medical Sciences Library, the library at the School of Education, the Festival Library and Cultural Resource Centre, the library at the Centre for Language Learning, the library attached to the Institute of International Relations, the Republic Bank Library at the Arthur Lok Jack Graduate School of Business, the library of the National Herbarium of Trinidad and Tobago, the Library at the Hugh Wooding Law School, the Seismic Research Centre Library, the Patience-Theunissen Memorial Library located at Mount Saint Benedict and the Library at Roytec at the UWI School of Business and Applied Studies.
