= Fredric Warburg =

British publisher and author (1898–1981)

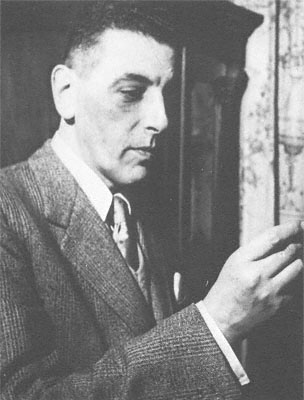
- Born: Fredric John Warburg; 27 November 1898; Paddington, London, England
- Died: 25 May 1981 (aged 82); London, England
- Education: Westminster School; Christ Church, Oxford
- Occupations: Publisher; author
- Known for: Founder of Secker & Warburg, publisher of George Orwell

Fredric John Warburg (27 November 1898 – 25 May 1981) was a British publisher, who in 1935 founded the company Secker & Warburg. He is best known for his association with the author George Orwell. During a career spanning a large part of the 20th century and ending in 1971, Warburg published Orwell's major books Animal Farm (1945) and Nineteen Eighty-Four (1949), as well as works by other leading figures such as Thomas Mann and Franz Kafka. Other notable publications included The Third Eye by Lobsang Rampa, Pierre Boulle's The Bridge over the River Kwai, Adolf Hitler's Mein Kampf and William Shirer's The Rise and Fall of the Third Reich.

Warburg is an important figure in the history and study of Cold War propaganda due to his work with Orwell's widow Sonia Orwell in a collaboration with the Information Research Department (IRD), a secret propaganda wing of the British Foreign Office, which helped to increase the fame of Animal Farm and Nineteen Eighty-Four. With Warburg's support, the IRD was able to translate Animal Farm into more than 16 different languages, and for British embassies to disseminate the book in more than 14 countries for propaganda purposes. Warburg was also involved in the sale of the film rights to Animal Farm to the American Central Intelligence Agency (CIA). This deal resulted in the creation of the 1954 propaganda film Animal Farm, which became the first feature-length animated film ever to be made in Britain.

== Life ==
Warburg was born on 27 November 1898 in Paddington, London, to John Cimon Warburg (1867, London – 1931, London), a photographer, and his wife Violet Amalia (1868, Melbourne – 1925, London) (née Sichel), both of Jewish descent. John Cimon was the oldest son of Fredric Elias Warburg (1832, Gothenburg, Sweden – 1899, London) and Emma (1844–1925) (née Raphael). John Cimon's sisters included the photographer Agnes Warburg.

At the age of nine, Fredric Warburg was sent to Wilkinson's boys' preparatory school. He later won a scholarship to Westminster School. He recalled his first two years there as "among the most hateful of my life". While he excelled academically, as a Jew he often felt an outsider. He found refuge and solace in his love of books.

In summer 1917, Warburg was commissioned to serve as an officer in the Royal Artillery. He was stationed in the Ypres area until the end of the First World War. After the war, he began studying chemistry at Christ Church, Oxford, but later switched to classics and philosophy, receiving his MA degree in 1922.

Warburg's first marriage (5 July 1922), to May Nellie Holt (born 20 May 1902, Hampstead, North-West London), produced three sons: David (22 August 1923–10 November 1987), Hew Francis (8 April 1925–10 April 1983) and Jeremy Fredric (14 October 1928–9 June 1986). The marriage ended in divorce in 1932, and on 21 January 1933 Warburg married the painter and designer Pamela Bryer (née de Bayou, widowed) (20 March 1905–1978). They had a son who died of a brain haemorrhage within 24 hours of his birth, on 13 March 1933.

During the Second World War, Warburg served as a corporal in the Home Guard, in the same section in which Orwell held the rank of sergeant.

Warburg died of heart failure at University College Hospital, London, on 25 May 1981, at the age of 82.

== Publishing career ==
Warburg started his publishing career in 1922, as an apprentice at Routledge & Sons, where he came under the tutelage of William Swan Stallybrass, a man he regarded as "the greatest scholar-publisher of his day". After Stallybrass died in 1931, Warburg became increasingly dissatisfied with Routledge and in 1935 he was dismissed. Later that year, he and Roger Senhouse purchased the publishing firm of Martin Secker, which had gone into receivership, and renamed it Secker & Warburg.

The firm became renowned for its independent left-wing position, being both anti-fascist and anti-Communist, which put it at loggerheads with many intellectuals of the time. Among the books the firm published were C. L. R. James's World Revolution, Reg Groves's We Shall Rise Again, Boris Souvarine's Stalin and André Gide's Back from the USSR.

When George Orwell parted company with Victor Gollancz, over the publication of The Road to Wigan Pier (1937), it was to Secker & Warburg that he took his next book, Homage to Catalonia (1938). The firm published all of Orwell's books from then on, and he and Warburg became intimate friends. In 1940, Warburg introduced Orwell to another of his firm's authors, T. R. Fyvel, and between the three of them they planned the creation of Searchlight Books.

According to Trinidadian historian and politician Eric Williams (1911–1981), Warburg refused to publish his doctoral thesis (completed in 1938, which became the basis of his book Capitalism and Slavery, and argued that Britain's desire to abolish slavery was economical, not humanitarian, in nature), saying that "such a book... would be contrary to the British tradition".

With its financial position devastated by paper shortages during and after the war, Secker & Warburg was forced to join the Heinemann publishing group in 1952. During the 1950s and 1960s, Secker & Warburg published books by authors including Simone de Beauvoir, Colette, Alberto Moravia, Günter Grass, Angus Wilson, Melvyn Bragg and Julian Gloag. In 1961, Warburg was made a director of the Heinemann group, a post he retained until his retirement in 1971.

Warburg published two volumes of autobiography: An Occupation for Gentlemen (1959, described by Walter Allen as "the record of a vocation rather than the story of it author's intimate life") and All Authors are Equal (1973).

== Controversy ==
In 1952, Warburg became a member of the committee of the Society for Cultural Freedom (SCF), an organisation established, in the words of Warburg's friend T. R. Fyvel, to "promote western culture and defend it against the Communist culture of the East". The SCF produced a cultural magazine, Encounter, which received sustained criticism in the 1960s when it emerged that much of the money used to produce the magazine had come directly from the CIA, without the knowledge of most of its contributors and supporters, including Warburg.

In 1954, Secker & Warburg was prosecuted for obscenity after publishing The Philanderer, a novel by US writer Stanley Kauffmann. Warburg was offered the chance to plead guilty and escape with a minimal fine, but opted for trial by jury at the Old Bailey. The book was found not to be obscene and the summary by the presiding judge, at the trial, Sir Wintringham Stable, was added as an appendix to later editions of The Philanderer.

== Bibliography ==
- An Occupation for Gentlemen. London: Hutchinson, 1959
- All Authors Are Equal: The Publishing Life of Fredric Warburg, 1936–1971. London: Hutchinson, 1973.
