= Capitalism and Slavery =

1944 doctoral dissertation by Eric Williams

Capitalism and Slavery is the published version of the doctoral dissertation of Eric Williams, who was the first Prime Minister of Trinidad and Tobago in 1962. It advances a number of theses on the impact of economic factors on the decline of slavery, specifically the Atlantic slave trade and slavery in the British West Indies, from the second half of the 18th century. It also makes criticisms of the historiography of the British Empire of the period: in particular on the use of the Slavery Abolition Act 1833 as a sort of moral pivot; but also directed against a historical school that saw the imperial constitutional history as a constant advance through legislation. It uses polemical asides for some personal attacks, notably on the Oxford historian Reginald Coupland. Seymour Drescher, a prominent critic among historians of some of the theses put forward in Capitalism and Slavery by Williams, wrote in 1987: "If one criterion of a classic is its ability to reorient our most basic way of viewing an object or a concept, Eric Williams's study supremely passes that test."

The applicability of the economic arguments, and specially in the form of so-called Ragatz–Williams decline theory, is a contentious matter to this day for historians, when it is used for the period around the American Revolutionary War. On the other hand detailed economic investigations of the effects of slavery on the British economy, in particular, the aftermath of abolition, and the commercial hinterland of the Atlantic trade, are a thriving research area. The historiography of the British Empire is still widely contested. Kenneth Morgan writing in the Oxford Dictionary of National Biography evaluates Capitalism and Slavery as "perhaps the most influential book written in the twentieth century on the history of slavery".

It was published in the United States in 1944, but major publishers refused to have it published in Britain, on grounds including that it undermined the humanitarian motivation for Britain's Slavery Abolition Act 1833. In 1964 André Deutsch published it in Britain; it went through numerous reprintings to 1991, and was published in the first UK mass-market edition by Penguin Modern Classics in 2022, becoming a best-seller.

== Williams as an Oxford undergraduate ==
In 1931 Williams came to the University of Oxford from Trinidad on an Island Scholarship. He joined St Catherine's Society, not then a college (until that year the Delegacy for Non-Collegiate Students). He obtained a first-class degree in Modern History, but found social life largely unfriendly. He made a friend of a Thai student, interacted with his tutors, and attended the Indian Majlis, a student club.

== The Economic Aspect of the Abolition of the West Indian Slave Trade and Slavery ==
Williams wrote his Oxford D.Phil. dissertation under Vincent Harlow, on a topic suggested by C. L. R. James. The tone of the dissertation is judged "deferential", in comparison with the 1944 published version.

One of the D.Phil. examiners was Reginald Coupland, from 1920 second holder of the Beit Chair at Oxford for "colonial history", founded in 1905. An emphasis on constitutional history led at Oxford, as Behm puts it, to "enthusiasm for social and moral reform [...] in an atmosphere already permeated by 'constitutional progress' as shorthand for centuries of world-historical advance". Alfred Beit, the founder, was a friend of Cecil Rhodes and Alfred Milner, and the Chair came under the influence of the Round Table movement that forwarded Milner's ideas, and to which Coupland belonged. In his later work British Historians and the West Indies (1966), Williams attacked the generality of Oxford historians who had dealt with the topic. He excepted Sydney Olivier.

Williams had been made aware of the potential importance of Coupland to his academic career by Joseph Oliver Cutteridge, the ex-British Army officer who was director of education in Trinidad and Tobago. This was at the point in 1936 when Williams was given funding for his doctoral work; Cutteridge had contacted Coupland on his behalf, to use influence with Claud Hollis, the Governor. Cutteridge had then advised "caution".

The original dissertation was published in 2014. Its argument has the same basic structure of a "decline" thesis, and the negation of good intentions of abolitionists as a historical factor. David Beck Ryden identifies the three faces of decline in the first half of the 19th century as: "falling sugar planting profits"; "decline of the relative importance of the West Indian trade" in the British economy; and "a rising anti-mercantilist tide".

== Howard University, and publication ==
Williams left the United Kingdom for the United States in 1939. After a period of unsuccessful job applications, he had been appointed assistant professor at Howard University, an historically black college, in Washington D.C. A close colleague there, who wrote a foreword to Williams's The Negro in the Caribbean (1942), was Alain LeRoy Locke. Others on the faculty were Ralph Bunche, E. Franklin Frazier, and Charles S. Johnson. Williams was brought to Howard by Locke, supported by Bunche and Abram Lincoln Harris, and took on a teaching load in the Political Science department.

Excerpts of his thesis were published in 1939 by The Keys, the journal of the London-based League of Coloured Peoples. An attempt by Williams to have his dissertation published in the United Kingdom through Fredric Warburg failed: the undermining of the humanitarian motivation for the Slavery Abolition Act 1833 was found unacceptable, culturally speaking. Publication of Capitalism and Slavery happened finally in the United States, in 1944. It appeared in a British edition in 1964, with an introduction by Denis William Brogan, summarising Williams's thesis in a phrase on abolition as a cutting of losses, and illustration of the workings of self-interest. Brogan had reviewed Capitalism and Slavery in The Times Literary Supplement, and accepted its general argument on the predominance of economic forces.

== Arguments and sources of Capitalism and Slavery ==
Capitalism and Slavery covers the economic history of sugar and slavery into the 19th century and discusses the decline of Caribbean sugar plantations from 1823 until the emancipation of the slaves in the 1830s. It also notes the British government's use of the equalisation of the sugar duties acts in the 1840s, to reduce protectionism for sugar from the British West Indian colonies, and promote free trade in sugar from Cuba and Brazil, where it was cheaper.

The work relied on economic reasoning going back to Lowell Joseph Ragatz, to whom it was dedicated. The secondary sources bibliography, after commending works by Ragatz, mentioned The Development of the British West Indies, 1700–1763 (1917) by the American historian Frank Wesley Pitman. In two 1918 reviews of Pitman's book, Hugh Edward Egerton, the first holder of the Beit Chair at Oxford, picked out the baseline 1763—when the Seven Years' War ended in the Peace of Paris, and Great Britain returned to France the Caribbean island of Guadeloupe while keeping Canada—as (in Pitman's argument) the start of manipulation of the sugar trade and its regulation, by British producers, for profit. In other words artificial scarcity was created by the West India Interest, an example of client politics.

In the American context, it had been argued by William Babcock Weeden (1834–1912), and in 1942 by Lorenzo Greene, that the slave trade was integral to the economic development of New England. Williams argued that slavery played a major role in developing the British economy; the high profits from slavery, he wrote, helped finance the Industrial Revolution. British capital was gained from unpaid work. The bibliography also cites The Black Jacobins by C. L. R. James for its priority in giving in 1938 a statement (in English) of the major thesis of Capitalism and Slavery; and a master's dissertation from that year by Wilson Williams at Howard University. Wilson Williams and Abram Harris are taken to be the sources of the work's interest in the commercial writer Malachy Postlethwayt.

The book, besides dealing with a passage of economic history, was furthermore a frontal attack on the idea that moral and humanitarian motives were key in the victory of British abolitionism. It was also a critique of the idea common in the 1930s, and in particular advocated by Reginald Coupland, that the British Empire was essentially propelled by benevolent impulses. The centenary celebration of the 1833 Act that took place in the United Kingdom in 1933, in Kingston upon Hull, where William Wilberforce was born, was a public event in which Coupland made these ideas explicit, supported in The Times by G. M. Trevelyan. Williams made a number of pointed critical remarks in this direction, including:

- "Professor Coupland contends that behind the legal judgement lay the moral judgement, and that the Somersett case was the beginning of the end of slavery throughout the British Empire. This is merely poetic sentimentality translated into modern history."
- From the "Conclusion": "But historians, writing a hundred years after, have no excuse for continuing to wrap the real interests in confusion." Footnoted as: "Of this deplorable tendency Professor Coupland of Oxford University is a notable example."

Williams rejected moralised explanation and argued that abolition was driven by diminishing returns, after a century of sugarcane raising had exhausted the soil of the islands. Beyond this aspect of the decline thesis, he argued that the slave-based Atlantic economy of the 18th century generated new pro-free trade and anti-slavery political interests. These interacted with the rise of evangelical antislavery and with the self-emancipation of slave rebels, from the Haitian Revolution of 1792–1804 to the Jamaica Christmas Rebellion of 1831, to bring the end of slavery in the 1830s.

== Periodisation of Capitalism and Slavery ==
The points raised required periodisation, by calibration to a timeline. The D.Phil. dissertation limited itself to the period 1780–1833.

In Chapter 4 of the book, "The West India Interest", an outline of a timeline is given, reflecting the difference of interests of planters and the sugar merchants:

- 1739: Planters and merchants find their interests conflicting, on the issue of free trade with continental Europe (p. 92).
- 1764: The West India Interest in its "heyday" (p. 97).
- c.1780: The American Revolution disrupts the existing system of British commerce (p. 96). At this point the interests of planters and merchants had become aligned (p. 92).
- 1832: The Reform Parliament at Westminster represents the Lancashire manufacturing interest, rather than the West India Interest (p. 97).

Chapter 5, "British Industry and the Triangular Trade", in other words on the Atlantic slave trade as part of the triangular trade completed by sugar, begins on p. 98 with "Britain was accumulating great wealth from the triangular trade." It ends with a few pages of overview, arguing that the economic development already visible by 1783 was outgrowing the system dubbed mercantilism. The 1807 prohibition of the international slave trade, Williams argued, prevented French expansion of sugar plantations on other islands. British investment turned to Asia, where labour was plentiful and slavery was unnecessary.

Dividing up the period c.1780 to 1832, by the end of the triangular trade in 1807, Williams wrote that "The abolitionists for a long time eschewed and repeatedly disowned any idea of emancipation." He also presented economic data to show that the triangular trade alone had generated only minor profits compared to the sugar plantations. Then from 1823 the British Caribbean sugar industry went into terminal decline, and the British parliament no longer felt they needed to protect the economic interests of the West Indian sugar planters.

== Reception ==
The book was published in the United States in 1944. Early American reviews by historians ranged from enthusiasm, with Henry Steele Commager, to expressed reservations from Elizabeth Donnan and Frank Tannenbaum. Ryden, writing in 2012 and relying on some citation analysis, spoke of three waves of interest in Capitalism and Slavery over the previous four decades and more, the first being associated with a largely critical review article of 1968 by Roger Anstey. The background was of consistent growth in attention.

Writing in 1994 in A Dictionary of Nineteenth-Century World History, Tadman stated that:

"A revised version of the Williams thesis (of economic and class self-interest leading to abolition) seems to have much explanatory power. Rising urban interests perceived slavery as unprofitable, backward, and a threat to liberal (and middle-class) values."

Hilary Beckles wrote in 2004 of "the fundamental academic respect that Capitalism and Slavery enjoys within the Caribbean", after noting the "persistent and penetrative criticisms". Supporters cited were Sydney H. H. Carrington (1937–2018), an advocate of the decline thesis as originally stated, and Gordon Kenneth Lewis (1919–1991), whose view was that "it is testimony to the essential correctness of that thesis that the attempt of a later scholarship to impugn it has been unsuccessful."

Billy Strachan, a leading Black civil rights activist and communist in Britain, credited the book with heavily influencing his world outlook.

No major British publisher published the book until forty years after Williams's death, although he had sought to have it published; it had been refused on grounds including that it undermined the humanitarian motivation for Britain's Slavery Abolition Act 1833. Publisher Fredric Warburg, who published several provocative books in 1930s Britain, considered that suggesting that the slave trade and slavery were abolished for economic and not humanitarian reasons was "contrary to the British tradition—I would never publish such a book". In 1964 André Deutsch published it in Britain, it went through numerous reprintings to 1991, and was published in the first UK mass-market edition by Penguin Modern Classics in 2022, becoming a best-seller.

=== Economic factors ===
Richard Pares, in an article written before Williams's book, had dismissed the influence of wealth generated from the West Indian plantations on the financing of the Industrial Revolution, stating that whatever substantial flow of investment from West Indian profits into industry there was had occurred after emancipation, not before. Heuman states:

In Capitalism and Slavery, Eric Williams argued that the declining economies of the British West Indies led to the abolition of the slave trade and of slavery. More recent research has rejected this conclusion; it is now clear that the colonies of the British Caribbean profited considerably during the Revolutionary and Napoleonic Wars.

Stanley Engerman finds that even without subtracting the associated costs of the slave trade or reinvestment of profits, the total profits from the slave trade and of West Indian plantations amounted to less than 5% of the British economy during any year of the Industrial Revolution. In support of the Williams thesis, Ryden (2009) presented evidence to show that by the early 19th century there was an emerging crisis of profitability. David Richardson (1998) finds Williams's claims regarding the Industrial Revolution are exaggerated, for profits from the slave trade amounted to less than 1% of domestic investment in Britain. He finds also that the "terms of trade" (how much the ship owners paid for the slave cargo) moved heavily in favour of the Africans after about 1750. Ward has argued that slavery remained profitable in the 1830s, because of innovations in agriculture.

=== Abolitionist sentiment ===
In a major attack on the propositions brought forward by Williams, Seymour Drescher in Econocide (1977) argued that the United Kingdom's abolition of the slave trade in 1807 resulted not from the diminishing value of slavery for the nation, but instead from the moral outrage of the British public which could vote. Geggus in 1981 gave details of the sugar industry of the British West Indies in the 1780s, casting some doubt on the method used by Drescher for capital valuation.

Carrington in a reply from 1984 advocated for two "main theses" stated in Capitalism and Slavery, and subsequently attacked by "historians from the metropolises": "the rise of industrial capitalism in Britain led to the destruction of the slave trade and slavery itself", and "the slave trade and the sugar industry based on slavery led to the formation of capital in England which helped in financing the Industrial Revolution". On the detail of Drescher's periodisation in arguing against the first of those theses, Carrington then says that Drescher is agreeing with what Ragatz had argued in 1928, namely that decline set in at peak prosperity for the planters, but was misplacing that peak by systematic neglect of the effects of the American Revolutionary War, and the slow subsequent recovery from those.

Professor David Eltis's 2025 book Atlantic Cataclysm:Rethinking the Atlantic Slave Trades highlights the fact that in the eighteenth century there was a thriving culture of reading newspaper and magazine with relatively high literacy rates in the english speaking world. These publications produced a steady flow of reporting about the violence on board slave-trading ships and in the slave colonies and these led to changes in attitudes to slavery. He says, "Value shifts in Britain and the northern US are an essential part of the explanation."

== Legacy ==
Robin Blackburn in The Overthrow of Colonial Slavery, 1776–1848 (1988) summarised the thesis of Capitalism and Slavery in the terms that it took slavery to be a part of colonial mercantilism, that was then overtaken by the colonial expansion and domestic wage labour of the rising European powers. Noting that Williams provided both argument and illustration, while ignoring slavery in the United States, he considers the schematic ultimately "mechanical and unsatisfactory". He finds David Brion Davis fuller on abolitionist thought, and Eugene Genovese better on the resistance ideas of the enslaved people.

Catherine Hall and the other authors of Legacies of British Slave-Ownership: Colonial Slavery and the Formation of Victorian Britain (2014) identified four key arguments of Capitalism and Slavery, and wrote of a schism between Anglo-American historians and those from the Caribbean on their status. The context is a series of projects run by University College London, with Web presence at www.ucl.ac.uk/lbs. The stated arguments are:

1. Slavery as key to the Industrial Revolution.
2. Slave-produced wealth as integral to the British economy in the 18th century.
3. Economic decline by 1783, or even 1763.
4. The role of the West Indian planters changed from the leading economic edge, to behind the times.

These are all recognised as somewhat contentious, with #1 and #3 particularly so. All four are considered fundamental to the project work, and capable of being illuminated by the gathering of further data.

Gareth Austin writing in the Cambridge History of Capitalism vol. II (2014) describes the rejection of Williams's thesis about the economic impact of slavery on the Industrial Revolution as revisionist interpretation. He goes on to describe a challenge to that interpretation by Joseph E. Inikori, based on whole-Atlantic trade and (for example) the hinterland trade of British cloth destined for West Africa. He footnotes a comment "One should distinguish the issue of causality of the industrial revolution from the fact that various specific industrial investments were indeed made with profits from slave ships or slave estates, as Williams documented."

In 2023, the Royal Historical Society hosted an event entitled: "Eric Williams’ Capitalism and Slavery: debates, legacies and new directions for research". Its panel included: Dr Heather Cateau, Dr Stephen Mullen, Professor Harvey Neptune, Professor Meleisa Ono-George and Professor Matthew J. Smith. They discussed its impact over the decades and the direction for future of historicism on slavery and the slave trade.

Professor David Eltis's 2025 book Atlantic Cataclysm:Rethinking the Atlantic Slave Trades highlights the fact that in 1804 there were 45 million enslaved people in the whole world of which the British held only about 750,000(1.7%) with far more being held in America and Brazil and asks the question - why didn't industrialization happen earlier in the Americas or in Spain or Portugal? He says, "Adopting these larger perspectives makes it beyond credulity that slavery or the slave trade that supported it could have kick-started economic growth. It is far more likely that the key to such developments lay in conditions within Britain, and eventually the Netherlands and the US, that enabled slaveholdings and other overseas activities to have had such an impact. Enslaved people and their owners could not by themselves have been critically important to industrialization."
