= Eric Williams =

Leader of Trinidad and Tobago from 1956 to 1981

The Honourable Eric Williams TC CH
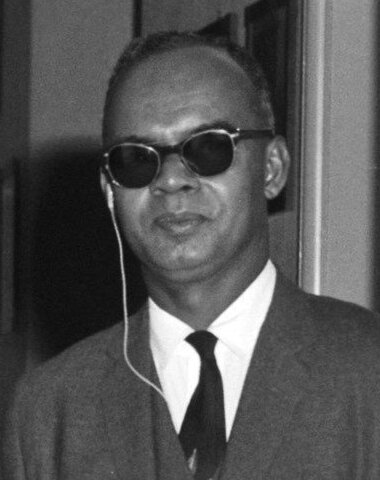
- Williams in 1962

1st Prime Minister of Trinidad and Tobago
- In office 31 August 1962 – 29 March 1981
- Monarchs: Elizabeth II (until 1976)
- President: Ellis Clarke (from 1976)
- Governors General: Solomon Hochoy; Ellis Clarke (until 1976)
- Preceded by: Office established; Himself (as Premier)
- Succeeded by: George Chambers

Premier of Trinidad and Tobago
- In office 9 July 1959 – 31 August 1962
- Monarch: Elizabeth II
- Governor: Edward Beetham; Solomon Hochoy
- Preceded by: Office established; Himself (as Chief Minister)
- Succeeded by: Office abolished; Himself (as Prime Minister)

2nd Chief Minister of Trinidad and Tobago
- In office 28 October 1956 – 9 July 1959
- Monarch: Elizabeth II
- Governor: Edward Beetham
- Preceded by: Albert Gomes
- Succeeded by: Office abolished; Himself (as Premier)

1st Leader of the People's National Movement
- In office 24 January 1956 – 29 March 1981
- Deputy: Patrick Solomon; A. N. R. Robinson; George Chambers
- Preceded by: Position established
- Succeeded by: George Chambers

Personal details
- Born: Eric Eustace Williams; 25 September 1911 Port of Spain, Trinidad and Tobago
- Died: 29 March 1981 (aged 69) Port of Spain, Trinidad and Tobago
- Party: PNM (1956–1981)
- Other political affiliations: WIFLP (1957–1962)
- Relations: Alexander Chamberlain Alexis (brother-in-law)
- Children: 3
- Education: St Catherine's College, Oxford; Queen's Royal College
- Nickname: Father of the Nation

Eric Eustace Williams (25 September 1911 – 29 March 1981) was a Trinidadian statesman, who has been dubbed the "Father of the Nation" having led the then-British Colony of Trinidad and Tobago to majority rule on 28 October 1956, to independence on 31 August 1962, and republic status, on 1 August 1976, leading an unbroken string of general election victories with his political party, the People's National Movement, until his death in 1981. He represented Port of Spain South in the Parliament of Trinidad and Tobago.

He was the first Prime Minister of Trinidad and Tobago and also a Caribbean historian, most noted for his Capitalism and Slavery.

== Early life ==
Williams was born on 25 September in 1911. His father Thomas Henry Williams was a minor civil servant and devout Roman Catholic, and his mother Eliza Frances Boissiere (13 April 1888 – 1969) was a descendant of the mixed French Creole Mulatto elite and had African and French ancestry. She was a descendant of the notable de Boissière family in Trinidad. Eliza's paternal grandfather was John Boissiere, a married upper-middle class Frenchman who had an intimate relationship with an African slave named Ma Zu Zule. From the union, Jules Arnold Boissiere, father of Eliza, was born. His sister Lucy married Alexander Chamberlain Alexis, who was a minister in his government.

He saw his first school years at Tranquillity Boys' Intermediate Government School and he was later educated at Queen's Royal College in Port of Spain, where he excelled both academically and at football. A football injury at QRC led to a hearing problem, after which he wore a hearing aid.

He won an island scholarship in 1932, which allowed him to attend St. Catherine's Society, Oxford (later renamed St. Catherine's College). In 1935, he received a first class honours degree, and ranked first among history graduates that year. He also represented the university at football. In 1938, he went on to obtain his doctorate. In Inward Hunger, his autobiography, he described his experience of studying at Oxford, including his frustrations with rampant racial discrimination at the institution, and his travels in Germany after the Nazis' seizure of power.

== Scholarly career ==
In Inward Hunger, Williams recounts that in the period following his graduation, he was "severely handicapped in my research by my lack of money ... I was turned down everywhere I tried ... and could not ignore the racial factor involved". However, in 1936, thanks to a recommendation made by Sir Alfred Claud Hollis (Governor of Trinidad and Tobago, 1930–36), the Leathersellers' Company awarded him a £50 grant to continue his advanced research in history at Oxford.

He completed the D.Phil in 1938 under the supervision of Vincent Harlow. His doctoral thesis was titled The Economic Aspects of the Abolition of the Slave Trade and West Indian Slavery, and was published as Capitalism and Slavery in 1944, although excerpts of his thesis were published in 1939 by The Keys, the journal of the League of Coloured Peoples. According to Williams, Fredric Warburg – a publisher of Marxist literature, who Williams asked to publish his thesis – refused to publish, saying that "such a book... would be contrary to the British tradition". His thesis was both a direct attack on the idea that moral and humanitarian motives were the key factors in the success of the British abolitionist movement, and a covert critique of the established British historiography on the West Indies (as exemplified by, in Williams' view, the works of Oxford professor Reginald Coupland) as supportive of continued British colonial rule. Williams's argument owed much to the influence of C. L. R. James, whose The Black Jacobins, also completed in 1938, also offered an economic and geostrategic explanation for the rise of abolitionism in the Western world.

Gad Heuman states:

In Capitalism and Slavery, Eric Williams argued that the declining economies of the British West Indies led to the abolition of the slave trade and of slavery. More recent research has rejected this conclusion; it is now clear that the colonies of the British Caribbean profited considerably during the Revolutionary and Napoleonic Wars.

However, Capitalism and Slavery covers the economic history of sugar and slavery beyond just the Revolutionary and Napoleonic Wars, and discusses the decline of sugar plantations from 1823 until the emancipation of the slaves in the 1830s. It also discusses the British government's use of the equalisation of the sugar duties Acts in the 1840s to sever their responsibilities to buy sugar from the British West Indian colonies, and to buy sugar on the open market from Cuba and Brazil, where it was cheaper. In support of the Williams thesis, David Ryden presented evidence to show that by the early nineteenth century there was an emerging crisis of profitability.

In contrast, recent interpretations of Capitalism and Slavery are less positive. David Brion Davis wrote that Wiliams' thesis "has now been wholly discredited by other scholars." Similarly, Nigel Biggar found that Williams' calculations were flawed, and profits from the slave trade were far less than he proposed.

Williams's argument about abolitionism went far beyond this decline thesis. He argued that the new economic and social interest created in the 18th century by the slave-based Atlantic economy generated new pro-free trade and anti-slavery political interests. These interacted with the rise of evangelical antislavery and with the self-emancipation of slave rebels, from the Haitian Revolution of 1792–1804 to the Jamaica Christmas Rebellion of 1831, to bring about the end of slavery in the 1830s.

In 1939, Williams joined the Political Science Department at Howard University. In 1943, Williams organised a conference about the "economic future of the Caribbean." He argued that small islands of the West Indies would be vulnerable to domination by the former colonial powers in the event that these islands became independent states; Williams advocated for a West Indian Federation as a solution to post-colonial dependence.

== Shift to public life ==
In 1944, Williams was appointed to the Anglo-American Caribbean Commission. In 1948, he returned to Trinidad as the Commission's deputy chairman of the Caribbean Research Council. In Trinidad, he delivered an acclaimed series of educational lectures. In 1955, after disagreements between Williams and the Commission, they elected not to renew his contract. In a speech at Woodford Square in Port of Spain, he declared that he had decided to "put down his bucket" in the land of his birth. He rechristened that enclosed park, which stood in front of the Trinidad courts and legislature, "The University of Woodford Square", and proceeded to give a series of public lectures on world history, Greek democracy and philosophy, the history of slavery, and the history of the Caribbean to large audiences drawn from every social class.

=== Entry into nationalist politics in Trinidad and Tobago ===
From that public platform on 15 January 1956, Williams inaugurated his own political party, the People's National Movement (PNM), which would take Trinidad and Tobago into independence in 1962, and dominate its post-colonial politics. Until this time his lectures had been carried out under the auspices of the Political Movement, a branch of the Teachers Education and Cultural Association, a group that had been founded in the 1940s as an alternative to the official teachers' union. The PNM's first document was its constitution. Unlike the other political parties of the time, the PNM was a highly organised, hierarchical body. Its second document was The People's Charter, in which the party strove to separate itself from the transitory political assemblages which had thus far been the norm in Trinidadian politics.

In elections held eight months later, on 24 September the People's National Movement won 13 of the 24 elected seats in the Legislative Council, defeating 6 of the 16 incumbents running for re-election. Although the PNM did not secure a majority in the 31-member Legislative Council, he was able to convince the Secretary of State for the Colonies to allow him to name the five appointed members of the council (despite the opposition of the Governor, Sir Edward Betham Beetham). This gave him a clear majority in the Legislative Council. Williams was thus elected Chief Minister and was also able to get all seven of his ministers elected.

=== Federation and independence ===
After the Second World War, the Colonial Office had preferred that British colonies move towards political independence in the kind of federal systems which had appeared to succeed since the Canadian confederation, which created Canada, in the 19th century. In the British West Indies, this goal coincided with the political aims of the nationalist movements which had emerged in all the colonies of the region during the 1930s. The Montego Bay conference of 1948 had declared the common aim to be the achievement by the West Indies of Dominion Status (which meant constitutional independence from the British government) as a federation. In 1958, a West Indies Federation emerged from the British Caribbean, which with British Guiana (now Guyana) and British Honduras (now Belize) choosing to opt out of the Federation, leaving Jamaica and Trinidad and Tobago as the dominant players. Most political parties in the various territories aligned themselves into one of two Federal political parties – the West Indies Federal Labour Party (led by Grantley Adams of Barbados and Norman Manley of Jamaica) and the Democratic Labour Party (DLP) led by Manley's cousin, Sir Alexander Bustamante. The PNM affiliated with the former, while several opposition parties (the People's Democratic Party, the Trinidad Labour Party and the Party of Political Progress Groups) aligned themselves with the DLP, and soon merged to form the Democratic Labour Party of Trinidad and Tobago.

The DLP victory in the 1958 Federal Elections and subsequent poor showing by the PNM in the 1959 County Council Elections soured Williams on the Federation. Lord Hailes (Governor-General of the Federation) also overruled two PNM nominations to the Federal Senate in order to balance a disproportionately WIFLP-dominated Senate. When Bustamante withdrew Jamaica from the Federation, this left Trinidad and Tobago in the untenable position of having to provide 75% of the Federal budget while having less than half the seats in the Federal government. In a speech, Williams declared that "one from ten leaves nought". Following the adoption of a resolution to that effect by the PNM General Council on 15 January 1962, Williams withdrew Trinidad and Tobago from the West Indies Federation. This action led the British government to dissolve the Federation.

In 1961 the PNM had introduced the Representation of the People Bill. This Bill was designed to modernise the electoral system by instituting permanent registration of voters, identification cards, voting machines and revised electoral boundaries. These changes were seen by the DLP as an attempt to disenfranchise illiterate rural voters through intimidation, to rig the elections through the use of voting machines, to allow Afro-Caribbean immigrants from other islands to vote, and to gerrymander the boundaries to ensure victory by the PNM. Opponents of the PNM saw "proof" of these allegations when A. N. R. Robinson was declared winner of the Tobago seat in 1961 with more votes than there were registered voters, and in the fact that the PNM was able to win every subsequent election until the 1980 Tobago House of Assembly Elections.

The 1961 elections gave the PNM 57% of the votes and 20 of the 30 seats. This two-thirds majority allowed them to draft the Independence Constitution without input from the DLP. Although supported by the Colonial Office, independence was blocked by the DLP, until Williams was able to make a deal with DLP leader Rudranath Capildeo that strengthened the rights of the minority party and expanded the number of Opposition Senators. With Capildeo's assent, Trinidad and Tobago became independent on 31 August 1962, 25 days after Jamaica. In addition to primeministership, Williams was also Minister of Finance from 1957 to 1961 and from 1966 to 1971.

== Black Power ==
Between 1968 and 1970 the Black Power movement gained strength in Trinidad and Tobago. The leadership of the movement developed within the Guild of Undergraduates at the St. Augustine Campus of the University of the West Indies. Led by Geddes Granger, the National Joint Action Committee joined up with trade unionists led by George Weekes of the Oilfields Workers' Trade Union and Basdeo Panday, then a young trade-union lawyer and activist. The Black Power Revolution started during the 1970 Carnival. In response to the challenge, Williams countered with a broadcast entitled "I am for Black Power". He introduced a 5% levy to fund unemployment reduction and established the first locally owned commercial bank. However, this intervention had little impact on the protests.

On 3 April 1970, a protester was killed by the police. This was followed on 13 April by the resignation of A. N. R. Robinson, Member of Parliament for Tobago East. On 18 April sugar workers went on strike, and there was the talk of a general strike. In response to this, Williams proclaimed a State of Emergency on 21 April and arrested 15 Black Power leaders. In response to this, a portion of the Trinidad and Tobago Defence Force, led by Raffique Shah and Rex Lassalle, mutinied and took hostages at the army barracks at Teteron. Through the action of the Trinidad and Tobago Coast Guard the mutiny was contained and the mutineers surrendered on 25 April.

Williams delivered three additional speeches in which he identified himself with the aims of the Black Power movement. He reshuffled his cabinet and removed three ministers (including two white members) and three senators. He also proposed a Public Order Bill which would have curtailed civil liberties in an effort to control protest marches. After public opposition, led by A. N. R. Robinson and his newly created Action Committee of Democratic Citizens (which later became the Democratic Action Congress), the Bill was withdrawn. Attorney General Karl Hudson-Phillips offered to resign over the failure of the Bill, but Williams refused his resignation.

== Personal life and death ==
Eric Williams had married Elsie Ribeiro, a music studies student born to a mother from Saint Vincent and the Grenadines and a Portuguese Trinidadian father, on 30 January 1937, while he was a postgraduate student at Oxford University. He had known Ribeiro from Trinidad before he left for the United Kingdom and she was the sister of his roommate in England. The ceremony was private, out of fear that the terms of his scholarship could have prohibited marriage. After he graduated, the couple moved to Washington, D.C. in the United States where he obtained a position at Howard University. They had a son, Alistair Williams, in 1943 and a daughter, Elsie Pamela Williams, in 1947. However, Williams questioned the paternity of Elsie Pamela, thus leading to problems in the marriage. In May 1948, Williams left Washington, D.C. to go back to Trinidad, abandoning his wife and children. His reason for not financially supporting them after leaving was because Ribeiro refused to send their children to Oxford University in the future.

After returning to Trinidad in 1948, he met Evelyn Siulan Soy Moyou, a typist 13 years his junior of Chinese descent on her father's side and Chinese, African, and Portuguese descent on her mother's side, and she was a niece of Solomon Hochoy, the future Governor and Governor-General of Trinidad and Tobago during Williams's premiership. She was working at the Caribbean Commission where Williams had taken up a position. They began a relationship, and he initiated divorce proceedings from Ribeiro in January 1950 on a Caribbean Commission trip to the US Virgin Islands.

Ribeiro responded with an injunction restraining him from proceeding with his petition. After dropping the proceedings, in a letter of April 1950 submitted to the jurisdiction of the District of Columbia court, he agreed to abide by its decision and be bound by an order regarding alimony. However, a few months later while on a research holiday in the United States he reinitiated divorce proceedings in Reno, Nevada, known for its quick divorces, due to the fact that Moyou was pregnant with his child. However, Ribeiro obtained an injunction preventing Williams from making any attempt at divorce, on the grounds that he had earlier subjected himself to the jurisdiction of the District of Columbia court. Williams filed formal proceedings for a divorce on 24 November 1950. On 13 December 1950, Williams was ordered to appear in court, most likely because he had filed for a divorce in Reno, even though he had earlier submitted himself to the jurisdiction of the District of Columbia. Even though a lawyer had been assigned to him, he did not appear and on 22 December 1950 he was ordered to be taken into custody by a US Marshal. His lawyer in Reno pointed out that his divorce had been granted, though a search of the court records showed no entry for a final decree. Williams eventually met the six-week residential requirement to obtain a Nevada divorce and on 2 January 1951, he married Moyou in Reno, in a ceremony performed by The Rev. Munroe Warner of First Christian Church. Their daughter, Erica Williams, was born on 12 February 1951, in Reno. After his second marriage, Ribeiro obtained a divorce from him on 20 January 1951, on grounds of desertion. It was made effective on 21 July 1951 and he was ordered to pay a monthly alimony of US$250 for the maintenance of his first wife and two children. On 26 May 1953, Moyou died from Tuberculosis.

He later married Mayleen Mook Sang, his daughter's dentist. She was of Chinese Guyanese origin. They were married on Caledonia Island on 13 November 1957 by Rev. Andrew McKean, of Greyfriars Presbyterian Church on Frederick Street in Port of Spain. However, the couple never lived together and the marriage was kept hidden by Williams. The marriage was exposed 18 months later when Mook Sang sent a copy of their marriage certificate to the Chronicle newspaper, following rumours of Williams having an affair with a local beauty queen. They remained married till his death. After his death she filed to receive Williams' benefits and pension from his premiership. However, the benefits were awarded to his daughter, Erica, who had been named heir in his will.

Williams died on 29 March 1981 at his official house in St. Ann's, Port of Spain. He was 69 years old at the time of his death.

== Legacy ==
=== Academic contributions ===
Williams specialised in the study of slavery. Many Western academics focused on his chapter on the abolition of the slave trade, but that is just a small part of his work. In his 1944 book, Capitalism and Slavery, Williams argued that the British government's passage of the Slave Trade Act in 1807 was motivated primarily by economic concerns rather than by humanitarian ones. Williams also argued that by extension, so was the emancipation of the slaves and the blockade of Africa, and that as industrial capitalism and wage labour began to expand, eliminating the competition from wage-free slavery became economically advantageous.

In an open letter to Solow, Yale Professor of History David Brion Davis refers to Williams' thesis of the declining economic viability of slave labour as "undermined by a vast mountain of empirical evidence and has been repudiated by the world’s leading authorities on New World slavery, the transatlantic slave trade, and the British abolition movement". A major work which was written to refute Eric Williams' thesis was Seymour Drescher's Econocide, which argued that when the slave trade was abolished in 1807, Britain's sugar economy was thriving. However, other historians have noted that Drescher ended his study of the economic history of the British West Indies in 1822, and did not address the decline of the British sugar industry (something which was highlighted by Williams) which began in the mid-1820s, and continued until the passage of the Slavery Abolition Act in 1833. The majority of Eric Williams' thesis, which addressed the decline of the sugar industry in the 1820s, the passage of the Slavery Abolition Act in 1833, and the sugar equalisation acts of the 1840s, has continued to influence the historiography of the 19th-century West Indies and its connection to the wider Atlantic world as a whole.

In addition to Capitalism and Slavery, Williams produced a number of other scholarly works focused on the Caribbean. Of particular significance are two published long after he had abandoned his academic career for public life: British Historians and the West Indies and From Columbus to Castro. The former, based on research done in the 1940s and initially presented at a symposium at Clark Atlanta University, sought to challenge established British historiography on the West Indies. Williams was particularly scathing in his criticism of the work of Scottish historian Thomas Carlyle. The latter work is a general history of the Caribbean from the 15th to the mid-20th centuries. The work appeared at the same time as a similarly titled book (De Cristóbal Colón a Fidel Castro) by another Caribbean scholar-statesman, Juan Bosch of the Dominican Republic.

Williams sent one of 73 Apollo 11 Goodwill Messages to NASA for the historic first lunar landing in 1969. The message still rests on the lunar surface today. He wrote, in part: "It is our earnest hope for mankind that while we gain the moon, we shall not lose the world."

=== The Eric Williams Memorial Collection ===
The Eric Williams Memorial Collection (EWMC) at the University of the West Indies in Trinidad and Tobago was inaugurated in 1998 by former US Secretary of State Colin Powell. In 1999, it was named to UNESCO's prestigious Memory of the World Register.

=== Film ===
In 2011, to mark the centenary of Williams' birth, Mariel Brown directed the documentary film Inward Hunger: the Story of Eric Williams, scripted by Alake Pilgrim.

== Selected bibliography ==
- Capitalism and Slavery, 1944
- Documents of West Indian History: 1492–1655 from the Spanish discovery to the British conquest of Jamaica, Volume 1, 1963
- History of the People of Trinidad and Tobago, 1964
- British Historians and the West Indies, 1964
- The Negro In The Caribbean, 1970
- Inward Hunger: The Education of a Prime Minister, 1971
- From Columbus to Castro: The History of the Caribbean 1492–1969, 1971
- Forged from the Love of Liberty: Selected Speeches of Dr. Eric Williams, 1981

== Notes ==
Preceded by Albert Gomes	Chief Minister of Trinidad and Tobago; 1956–59	Succeeded by none
Preceded by none	Premier of Trinidad and Tobago; 1959–61	Succeeded by none
Preceded by none	Prime Minister of Trinidad and Tobago; 1962–81	Succeeded by George Chambers
