= Alexander Chamberlain Alexis =

Trinidad and Tobago politician (1921–2014)

The Honourable Alexander Chamberlain Alexis MP

Member of Parliament for La Brea
- In office 1961–1976
- Succeeded by: Ian Anthony

Personal details
- Born: October 15, 1921 Grenada
- Died: September 26, 2014 (aged 93)
- Party: People's National Movement
- Relations: Eric Williams (brother-in-law)

Alexander Chamberlain Alexis (October 15, 1921 – September 26, 2014) was a Trinidad and Tobago politician from the People's National Movement.

== Career ==
Alexis served as a member of parliament and a cabinet minister in the post independence era.

== Personal life ==
His wife Lucy was the sister of Eric Williams.
