= Eric Williams Memorial Collection =

The Eric Williams Memorial Collection (EWMC), located at the University of the West Indies in Trinidad and Tobago, was inaugurated in 1998 by former US Secretary of State Colin Powell. In 1999, it was added to UNESCO’s Memory of the World international register. Powell heralded Eric Williams as a tireless warrior in the battle against colonialism, and for his many other achievements as a scholar, politician and international statesman.

The Collection consists of Williams' library and archives. Available for consultation by researchers, the Collection reflects its owner’s personal interests, comprising some 7,000 volumes, as well as correspondence, speeches, manuscripts, historical writings, research notes, conference documents and reports. The Museum contains a wealth of memorabilia of the period and copies of the translations of Williams’ seminal work, Capitalism and Slavery, into seven languages, Russian, Chinese and Japanese [1968, 2004] among them. Most recently, a Korean translation was released in 2006. Photographs depicting various aspects of his life and contribution to the development of Trinidad and Tobago complete the archive, as does a three-dimensional re-creation of Williams’ study.

Colin Palmer, Dodge Professor of History at Princeton University, said of the Collection: “as a model for similar archival collections in the Caribbean…I remain very impressed by its breadth...[It] is a national treasure.” Palmer’s new biography of Williams up to 1970, entitled Eric Williams and the Making of the Modern Caribbean, published by the University of North Carolina Press, is dedicated to the Collection.

Visitors of the EWMC Museum include the Vice President of India; the Prime Minister and former Prime Minister of St. Vincent/Grenadines and Jamaica respectively; former Mayor of New York City Rudolph Giuliani and two Nobel Laureates in Economics, Amartya Sen and Harry Markowitz. The museum is also a common field trip destination for thousands of Trinidad and Tobago students - along with schools from St. Lucia, Guadeloupe (including the Chamber of Commerce), the US Virgin Islands, Barbados (several groups), Chicago, Illinois, and the University of California, Fresno, US.

== The Eric Williams Memorial Lecture ==
The EWMC is actively involved in academia and Caribbean communities through the annual Eric Williams Memorial Lecture at Florida International University in Miami. Featured speakers at the Lecture include: John Hope Franklin, one of America’s premier Black historians (1999); Kenneth Kaunda, former President of Zambia, (2000); Hilary Beckles, Principal and Pro Vice-Chancellor of The University of the West Indies (2001); Cynthia Pratt, the Deputy Prime Minister of the Bahamas, Mia Mottley, the Attorney General of Barbados, and Beverley Anderson-Manley, former First Lady of Jamaica (2002). Angela Davis, civil and women’s rights activist, was the featured speaker in 2003, and in honour of the Haitian Bicentennial, University of Virginia political scientist Robert Fatton, Jr., and prize-winning author Edwidge Danticat spoke in 2004. In 2005, a Trinidad and Tobago national was welcomed to the podium for the first time - Hollis Liverpool a.k.a. Chalkdust, calypsonian and professor at the University of the Virgin Islands, who spoke on Eric Williams and calypso.

== Related academic initiatives ==
Colin Palmer’s new biography of Williams up to 1970, entitled Eric Williams and the Making of the Modern Caribbean, published by the University of North Carolina Press, is dedicated to the Collection. Three other scholarly biographies of Williams either have been published or are in progress in the eight years since the inception of the EWMC: The Elusive Eric Williams by Ken Boodhoo, of Florida International University (and published by Media and Editorial Projects Limited's Prospect Press and Ian Randle Publishers); an edition by Selwyn Ryan, University of the West Indies; and The Making of a Movement Intellectual by Maurice St. Pierre of Morgan State University.

The first-ever Spanish translation of Williams’ History of the Caribbean, From Columbus to Castro (2006); the 2000 republication, after decades, of the same book in Japanese, and its re-issue in the United Kingdom in 2004 after a hiatus of seven years. Also reissued in 2004 was the 1944 book, The Economic Future of the Caribbean – edited by Williams and the respected African-American sociologist E. Franklin Frazier. The Economic Future of the Caribbean is a selection of papers presented at a 1943 Howard University conference that Williams organized. The vision articulated in this work remains relevant to 21st-century Caribbean. To date, the new edition of the book has been launched in Trinidad and Tobago; Washington, DC; Toronto, Canada; and London, UK. The New York launch in 2006, sponsored jointly by members of the Caribbean Diplomatic Corps, also celebrated the declaration of June as National Caribbean American Month in the USA.

A new edition of Inward Hunger, Williams’ long out-of-print autobiography, (with an Introduction by Colin Palmer) is now available. His Negro in the Caribbean (with a new introduction by Winston James, University of California, Irvine professor) is slated for future re-release in the United States. University Press of Florida expressed interest in publishing the proceedings of the New York Schomburg Center Eric Williams conference in 2002 - Into The Post-Colonial Moment: Eric Williams and West Indian Nationalism, edited by Professors William Darity, Jr. (Duke University/University of North Carolina at Chapel Hill) and Tanya Shields, (UNC, Chapel Hill).

The EWMC has also supported the inclusion of entries on Eric Williams in: The Encyclopedia of Antislavery, Abolition and Emancipation, written by Joseph Inikori, University of Rochester; The Encyclopedia of the African Diaspora, by William Darity, University of North Carolina/Duke University, and Clare Newstead, University of Nottingham-Trent, UK.
