= London Society of West India Planters and Merchants =

British lobbying group founded 1775

The London Society of West India Planters and Merchants was an organisation established to represent the views of those engaged in the trade with the Caribbean that held a diverse range of views on the region, ranging from London-based merchants to British West Indian planters, including both pro and anti-abolitionists.‍

The Society was formed in 1775 and brought together three different groups: British-based sugar merchants, absentee planters and colonial agents.‍

== Background ==
Estimates of the size of the West India Lobby vary between 20 and 60 Members of Parliament, the wide variance arising from whether tight or loose criteria are used to define what was an informal lobby. This informal way of organizing was effective prior to 1763 while their interest was aligned with the mercantilist approach which dominated British thinking: by supplying tropical staples, they did not compete with produce grown in Britain, and they provided a market for the produce they imported from within the empire. Thus informal contacts, dinners and individual solicitation were sufficient to see the passage of the Molasses Act or the defeat of Henry Pelham's proposed sugar duty.‍

However, particularly during and following the American Revolution, the West Indian merchants lost not only a market for rum, but also a source of provisions. This situation was exacerbated with the entry of France into the American Revolutionary War in 1778. Still, West Indian planters exerted their influence in the House of Commons, and by the 1780s it was estimated that as many as 74 MPs were absentee planters or had connections with various British West Indian colonies.‍ These connections also translated into financial arrangements with the Incorporated Society for the Conversion and Religious Instruction of the Negro Slaves in the British West India Islands. The following is from the annual report of the Incorporated Society of the Conversion of Religious Instruction and Education of Negro Slaves in the British West India islands, "That the Treasurer of the West India Planters and Merchants, be authorized to pay over to the Treasurer of the Society of the Conversion of the Religious Instruction and Education of Negros in the British West India Islands of one thousand pounds from the general fund of the West India Planters and Merchants of the City of London."

The society started with a predominantly Jamaican leadership, but by the 1830s, as emancipation approached, the leadership came to include a broader ranger of planter interests from across the British West Indies.‍

The society evolved into a modern charity, the West India Committee.

== Archives ==
The Society's minute books were purchased by the government of Trinidad and Tobago. They are currently held at the Alma Jordan Library, at the University of the West Indies, St. Augustine.‍

== See also ==
- West India Interest
- Sugar plantations in the Caribbean
- Plantocracy – Ruling classes who profit from slavery
- West India Dock – Historic dock site in eastern London
