= Lobsang Rampa =

English writer (1910–1981)

- Lobsang Rampa
- Born: Cyril Henry Hoskin; 8 April 1910; Plympton, Devon, United Kingdom
- Died: 25 January 1981 (aged 70); Calgary, Alberta, Canada
- Other names: Tuesday Lobsang Rampa, Carl Kuon Suo
- Citizenship: British; Canadian
- Occupation: Author
- Years active: 1956–1980
- Known for: The Third Eye
- Spouse: San Ra'ab Rampa
- Children: Sheelagh Rouse (adopted)

Lobsang Rampa was the pen name of Cyril Henry Hoskin (8 April 1910 – 25 January 1981), an English author who wrote books with paranormal and occult themes. His best known work is The Third Eye, published in Britain in 1956.

Following the publication of the book, newspapers reported that Rampa had been born Cyril Henry Hoskin, and was a surgical fitter, the son of a plumber from Plympton in Devon, who claimed that his body hosted the spirit of a Tibetan lama going by the name of Tuesday Lobsang Rampa, who is purported to have authored the books. The name Tuesday relates to a claim in The Third Eye that Tibetans are named after the day of the week on which they were born.

== The Third Eye ==
Rampa's book The Third Eye was published in November 1956 in the United Kingdom. The book purported to relate Rampa's experiences while growing up in Chakpori Lamasery, Chokpori, Tibet, after being sent there at the age of seven. The title of the book is derived from an operation, similar to trepanation, that Rampa claimed he had undergone, in which a small hole was drilled into his forehead to arouse the third eye and enhance powers of clairvoyance. The book describes the operation as follows:

The instrument penetrated the bone. A very hard, clean sliver of wood had been treated by fire and herbs and was slid down so that it just entered the hole in my head. I felt a stinging, tickling sensation apparently in the bridge of my nose. It subsided and I became aware of subtle scents which I could not identify. Suddenly there was a blinding flash. For a moment the pain was intense. It diminished, died and was replaced by spirals of colour. As the projecting sliver was being bound into place so that it could not move, the Lama Mingyar Dondup turned to me and said: "You are now one of us, Lobsang. For the rest of your life you will see people as they are and not as they pretend to be."

During the story, Rampa sees yetis and eventually encounters a mummified body of himself from an earlier incarnation. He also takes part in an initiation ceremony in which he learns that during its early history the Earth was struck by another planet, causing Tibet to become the mountain kingdom that it is today.

The manuscript of The Third Eye had been turned down by several leading British publishers before being accepted by Secker & Warburg for an advance of £800 (£17,000 today). Fredric Warburg of Secker & Warburg had met the book's author, who at the time appeared in the guise of "Doctor Carl Kuon Suo". Intrigued by the writer's personality, Warburg sent the manuscript to a number of scholars, several of whom expressed doubts about its authenticity. Nevertheless, the book was published in November 1956 and soon became a global bestseller. The Times Literary Supplement said of the book: "It came near to being a work of art."

=== Controversy over authorship ===
Explorer and Tibetologist Heinrich Harrer was unconvinced about the book's origins and hired a private detective from Liverpool named Clifford Burgess to investigate Rampa. "In January 1957, Scotland Yard asked him to present a Tibetan passport or a residence permit. Rampa moved to Ireland. One year later, the scholars retained the services of Clifford Burgess, a leading Liverpool private detective. Burgess's report, when it came in, was terse. Lama Lobsang Rampa of Tibet, he determined after one month of inquiries, was none other than Cyril Henry Hoskin, a native of Plympton, Devonshire, the son of the village plumber and a high school dropout." The findings of Burgess' investigation were published in the Daily Mail in February 1958. Hoskin had never been to Tibet and spoke no Tibetan. In 1948, he had legally changed his name to Carl Kuon Suo before adopting the name Lobsang Rampa. An obituary of Fra' Andrew Bertie, Grand Master of the Sovereign Military Order of Malta, claims that he was involved in unmasking Lobsang Rampa as a West Country plumber.

Rampa was tracked by the British press to Howth, Ireland, and confronted with these allegations. He did not deny that he had been born as Cyril Hoskin, but claimed that his body was now occupied by the spirit of Lobsang Rampa. According to the account given in his third book, The Rampa Story, he had fallen out of a fir tree in his garden in Thames Ditton, Surrey, while attempting to photograph an owl. He was concussed and, on regaining his senses, had seen a Buddhist monk in saffron robes walking towards him. The monk spoke to him about Rampa taking over his body and Hoskin agreed, saying that he was dissatisfied with his current life. When Rampa's original body became too worn out to continue (following the events of his second book Doctor From Lhasa where, as a doctor in charge, he was questioned and tortured to the brink of death by the Japanese after being seized in the advance following the capture of Nanning as part of the Battle of South Guangxi), he took over Hoskin's body in a process of transmigration of the soul.

Rampa maintained for the rest of his life that The Third Eye was a true story. In the foreword to the 1964 edition of the book, he wrote: "I am Tuesday Lobsang Rampa, that is my only name, now my legal name, and I answer to no other."

To Donald S. Lopez Jr., an American Tibetologist, the books of Lobsang Rampa are "the works of an unemployed surgical fitter, the son of a plumber, seeking to support himself as a ghostwriter."

The authorship controversy was dramatised in a radio play, The Third Eye and the Private Eye, by David Lemon and Mark Ecclestone, first broadcast by BBC Radio 4 in August 2012.

=== Influence on Tibetologists' callings ===
Donald S. Lopez, Jr., in Prisoners of Shangri-La (1998), points out that when discussing Rampa with other Tibetologists and Buddhologists in Europe, he found that The Third Eye was the first book many of them had read about Tibet: "For some it was a fascination with the world Rampa described that had led them to become professional scholars of Tibet."

Lopez adds that when he gave The Third Eye to a class of his at the University of Michigan without telling them about its history, the "students were unanimous in their praise of the book, and despite six prior weeks of lectures and readings on Tibetan history and religion, [...] they found it entirely credible and compelling, judging it more realistic than anything they had previously read about Tibet."

== Role in the Tibetan cause ==
In his publications, Lobsang Rampa consistently presented himself as Tibetan. Despite doubts about his identity and criticism of his books, he continued to advocate for the Tibetan cause and repeatedly expressed sympathy for the Tibetan people and their spiritual traditions. In 1972, Rampa’s French-language agent, Alain Stanké, wrote to the Dalai Lama seeking his opinion on Rampa’s identity. The Dalai Lama’s deputy secretary, Lobsang Wangchuk, replied:

I wish to inform you that we do not place credence in the books written by the so-called Dr. T. Lobsang Rampa. His works are highly imaginative and fictional in nature.

— Lobsang Wangchuk, Deputy Secretary to the Dalai Lama, Central Tibetan Administration, Dharamsala, letter dated 13 October 1972.

The Dalai Lama had previously acknowledged that, although the books were fictional, they had helped to draw greater attention to Tibet. In a later account, the Dalai Lama is quoted as saying, “I must thank him; he has given us a lot of publicity!”

== Later career ==
Lobsang Rampa went on to write another 18 books containing a mixture of religious and occult material. One of the books, Living with the Lama, was described as being dictated to Rampa by his pet Siamese cat, Mrs. Fifi Greywhiskers. Faced with repeated accusations from the British press that he was a charlatan and a con artist, Rampa went to live in Canada in the 1960s. He and his wife, San Ra'ab, became Canadian citizens in 1973, along with his companion and secretary Sheelagh Rouse ("Buttercup"), described by the writer Eric Newby, sent by Rampa's publisher Secker & Warburg to meet Rampa in Ireland, as "a fresh-faced, very English-looking girl who told me that she had left her husband (who was a member of Lloyd's) and her three children in order to live as a disciple in the Lama's house". Lobsang Rampa died in Calgary on 25 January 1981, at the age of 70.

== Writings ==
- The Third Eye. London: Secker & Warburg. 1956.
- Doctor from Lhasa. London: Souvenir Press. 1959. Sequel to The Third Eye
- The Rampa Story. London: Souvenir Press. 1960. ISBN 0-285-50183-6. Sequel to Doctor from Lhasa
- Cave of the Ancients. London: Corgi Books. 1963. ISBN 0-552-11464-2.
- Living with the Lama. London: Corgi Books. 1964. ISBN 0-552-08408-5.
- You Forever. London: Corgi Books. 1965. ISBN 0-552-07144-7.
- Wisdom of the Ancients. London: Corgi Books. 1965. ISBN 0-552-07248-6.
- The Saffron Robe. London: Corgi Books. 1966. ISBN 0-552-07349-0.
- Chapters of Life. London: Corgi Books. 1967. ISBN 0-552-07652-X.
- Beyond the Tenth. London: Corgi Books. 1969. ISBN 0-552-08105-1.
- Feeding the Flame. London: Corgi Books. 1971. ISBN 0-552-08611-8.
- The Hermit. London: Corgi Books. 1971. ISBN 0-552-08765-3.
- The Thirteenth Candle. London: Corgi Books. 1972. ISBN 0-552-08880-3.
- Candlelight. London: Corgi Books. 1973. ISBN 0-552-09390-4.
- Twilight. London: Corgi Books. 1975. ISBN 0-552-09767-5.
- As It Was!. London: Corgi Books. 1976. ISBN 0-552-10087-0.
- I Believe. London: Corgi Books. 1976. ISBN 0-552-10416-7.
- Three Lives. London: Corgi Books. 1977. ISBN 0-552-10707-7.
- Tibetan Sage. London: Corgi Books. 1980. ISBN 0-552-11563-0.

== Unauthorized publications ==
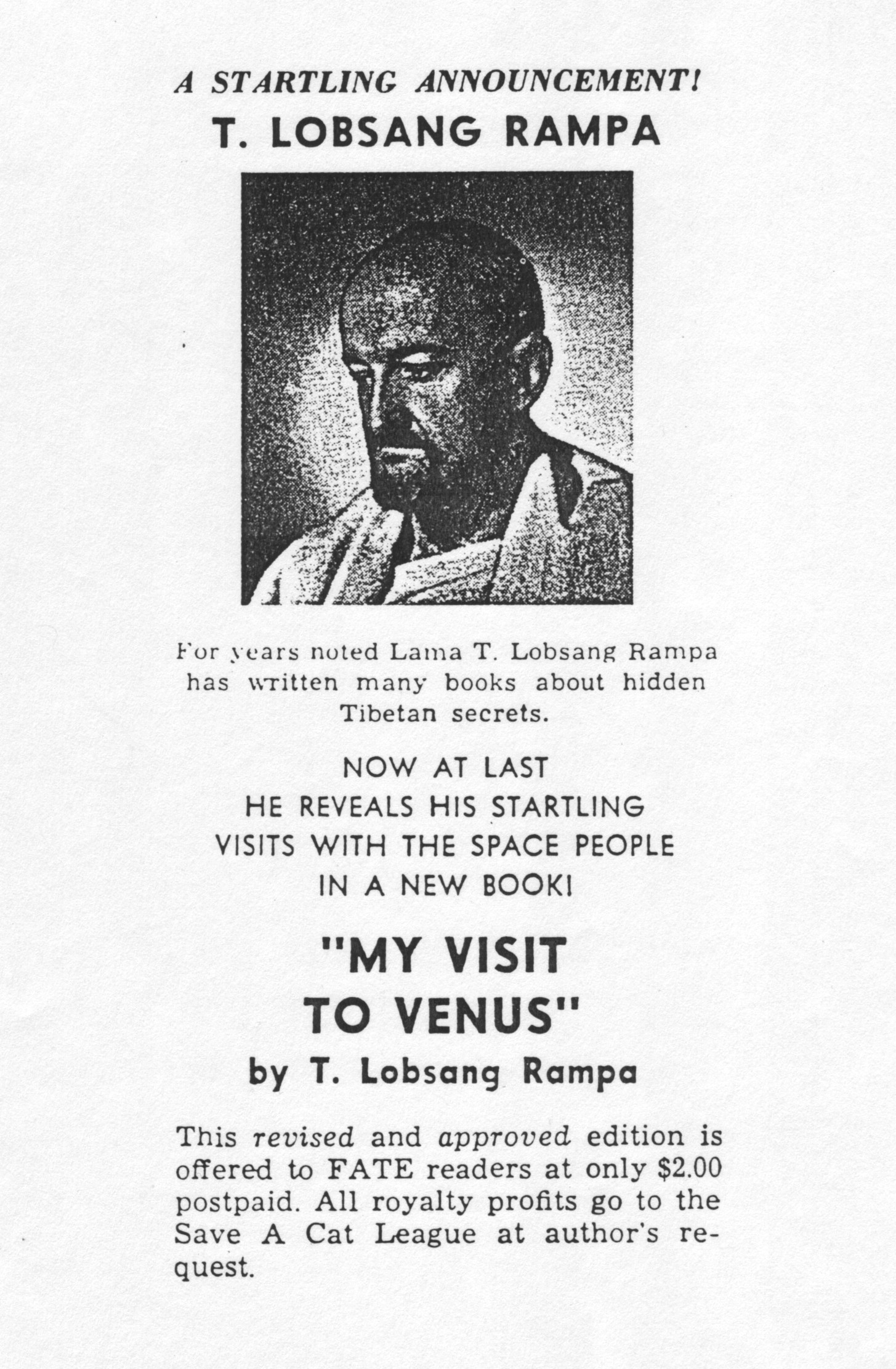
Publisher’s advertisement for a later edition of My Visit to Venus (first published in this form in 1966), a book compiled by Gray Barker (Saucerian Books), published without Rampa’s authorization and based only to a limited extent on earlier articles by Rampa.

- My Visit to Venus. Clarksburg, West Virginia: Saucerian Books. 1966. My Visit to Venus was not authorized by Lobsang Rampa. Although some of the material it contains was written by him, the resulting book was not. It was compiled by Gray Barker of Saucerian Books, who also expanded it with additional material to an extent that is not known, using Rampa’s name and articles without his permission while Rampa was living in Uruguay. Both the title of the book and its illustrations were Barker’s work. According to Rampa’s own account, the original articles amounted to only a few pages and had previously appeared in various UFO magazines. The articles “Saucers over Tibet” and “Flying into Space” are documented as having appeared in Flying Saucer Review in 1957. Rampa objected to the publication of My Visit to Venus, but offered to allow Barker to continue selling the book under certain conditions. For financial and health reasons, Rampa said that he was unable to take action against what he regarded as plagiarism. He opposed the book and explicitly did not recommend it. The extent to which the published version actually contains authentic material by Rampa, and which parts resulted from Barker’s additions, can no longer be established with certainty. Later promotional material from the publisher explained the book’s origins by stating that “it was rescued from the dustbin by Gray Barker”
- My Visit to Agharta: The Long Lost Books of Rampa. New Brunswick, NJ: Inner Light – Global Communications. 2003. ISBN 1-892062-34-8. According to the book, My Visit to Agharta originated from the estate of James (“Jim”) Sylvester Rigberg, publisher of the Flying Saucer News newsletter and proprietor of the Flying Saucer News Bookstore in Spanish Harlem, New York City. The book’s foreword states that Rampa had befriended Rigberg and, as a favour, sent him writings that had previously been rejected for publication. One of these envelopes allegedly contained the account of Rampa’s purported journey into the interior of the Earth. As My Visit to Agharta was not published until long after Rampa’s death, its authorship cannot be conclusively established.
- Cosmic Telepathy: A How-To Study Guide to Mental Telepathy. New Brunswick, NJ: Inner Light – Global Communications. 2012. ISBN 978-1-892062-62-8. This book was not written in collaboration with T. Lobsang Rampa. It was written solely by an author named Tuella, who claimed to have received the information telepathically from Lobsang Rampa. During his lifetime, Rampa had already distanced himself from similar claims of telepathic involvement.

== Discography ==
=== LP ===
- Meditation. A Touchstones Ltd., 1969, AR 887, UK (spoken word).
- The Power of Prayer. Saucerian Records, 1967, No. 169, US (spoken word). According to Rampa, the recording was never intended for release, and he explicitly disavowed it. It was released by Gray Barker through Saucerian Records without Rampa’s permission and against his wishes while Rampa was living in Uruguay.
