= Agnes Warburg =

British photographer (1872–1953)

Agnes Beatrice Warburg
- Born: 1872; London, United Kingdom
- Died: 4 January 1953 (aged 80–81); Surrey, United Kingdom
- Known for: Photography
- Movement: Pictorialism

Agnes Beatrice Warburg (1872 – 4 January 1953) was a British photographer.

== Career ==
She had been encouraged to take up photography by her brother, John Cimon Warburg (1867–1931), who also worked with colour.

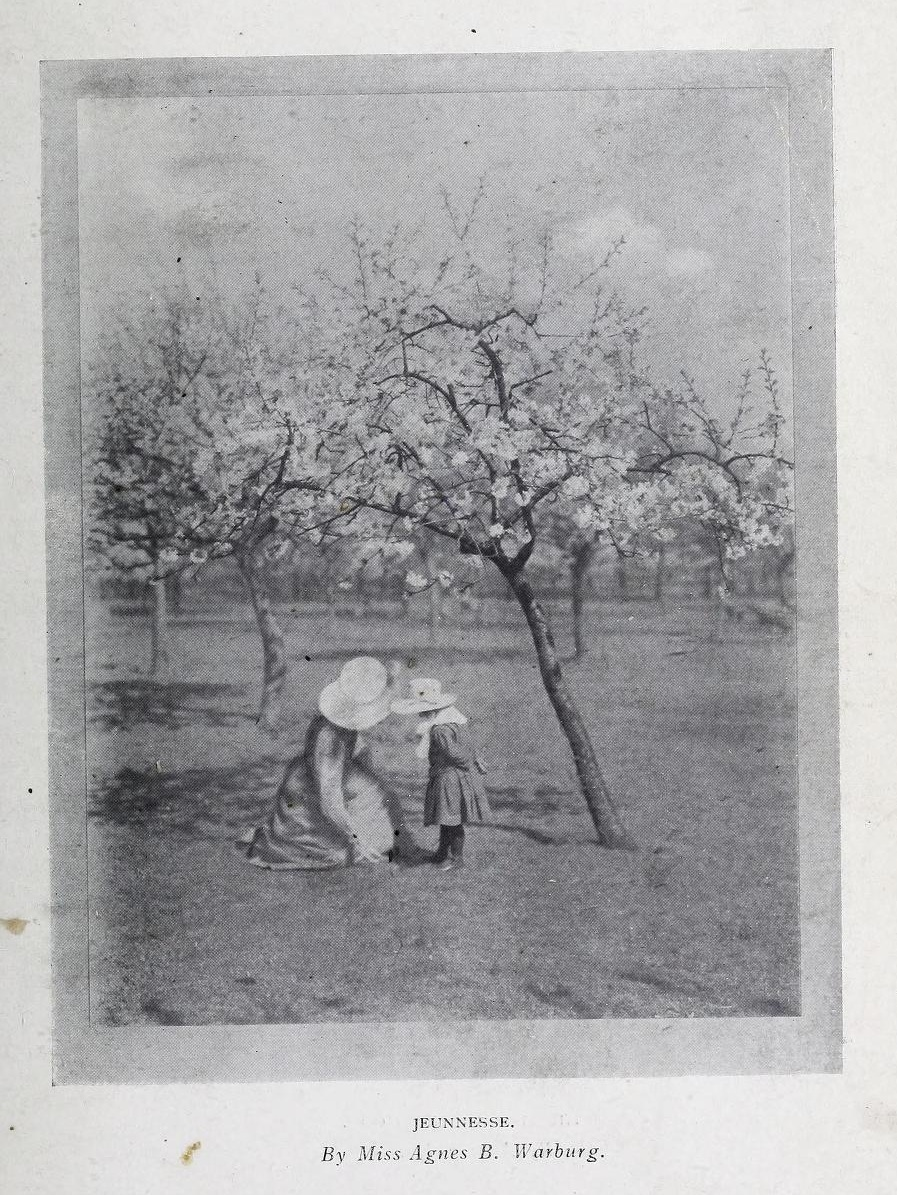
Jeunnesse by Agnes Warburg, 1907

Warburg's first colour photograph (1908) was created using a subtractive process Subtractive color and is preserved in the Royal Photographic Society collection at the Victoria and Albert Museum in London*. Warburg went on to exhibit with the Linked Ring and at the Royal Photographic Society, where she was a founder-member of the Pictorial and Colour Groups. As a result of her Pictorialist approach, she used photography as an art form rather than for commercial gain. Her results using the Autochrome process were of a remarkably high quality.

Warburg died on 4 January 1953 at her home in Bramley, Surrey, where she had lived for the final seven years of her life. In her will, she gave 70 acres (28 ha) of land on Box Hill to the National Trust.

Her nephew was the publisher Fredric Warburg. In his first volume of autobiography, Fredric credits her with providing crucial financial support for his company Secker & Warburg.
