= West India Interest =

The West India Interest lobbied on behalf of the Caribbean sugar trade in Britain during the late eighteenth century.

Beginning in the 17th century, Caribbean colonies appointed paid lobbyists, who were called colonial agents, to act on behalf of the legislatures in the colonies. These local legislatures represented the interests of the plantation owning class in the colonies. The agents, who lobbied to protect the interests of plantation owners, were often members of the British Parliament.

Lillian Penson identified three distinct interest groups in London, who decided to work together: agents from the West Indian colonies, merchants who traded with the colonies and plantation owners who lived in London. This group supported the Molasses Act 1733, which sought to tax molasses that was shipped to New England from the Caribbean. This tax was supposed to be collected from the American people. When tensions between the American colonies and the British Crown increased in the years before the American Revolutionary War, the West India Interest sided with the Crown.

In the 1780s, the British Parliament acted against the wishes of Caribbean plantation owners by banning American ships from ports in the Caribbean colonies. The relationship further deteriorated in 1790s when the British armed Caribbean slaves during the Anglo-French War.

The group's influence declined when sugar prices dropped in the late 1820s, which undermined their financial influence. Other factors that undermined the group's influence included the rise of the anti-slavery Whig Party and the passing of the Great Reform Act 1832. They blamed abolitionists for their increasing economic problems and lobbied for "compensation" until the Slavery Abolition Act 1833 was passed.

== See also ==
- Sugar plantations in the Caribbean
- London Society of West India Planters and Merchants
- Plantocracy
- West India Dock
