= Edward Stanford =

English businessman and cartographer

- Born: 27 May 1827; London, England
- Died: 3 November 1904 (aged 77)

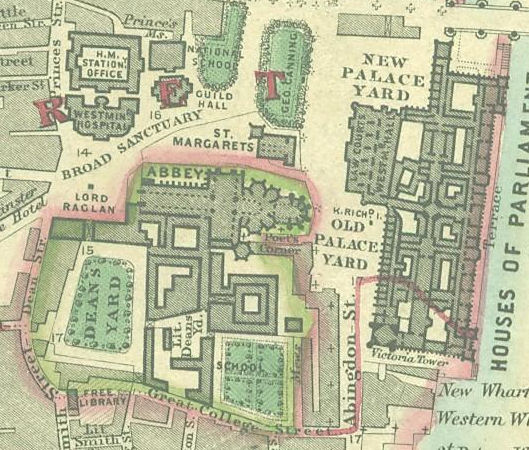
Detail of Westminster Abbey and the Palace of Westminster, from Stanford's 1862 map of London

Edward Stanford (27 May 1827 – 3 November 1904) was the founder of Stanfords, now a pair of map and book shops based in London and Bristol, UK.

== Biography ==
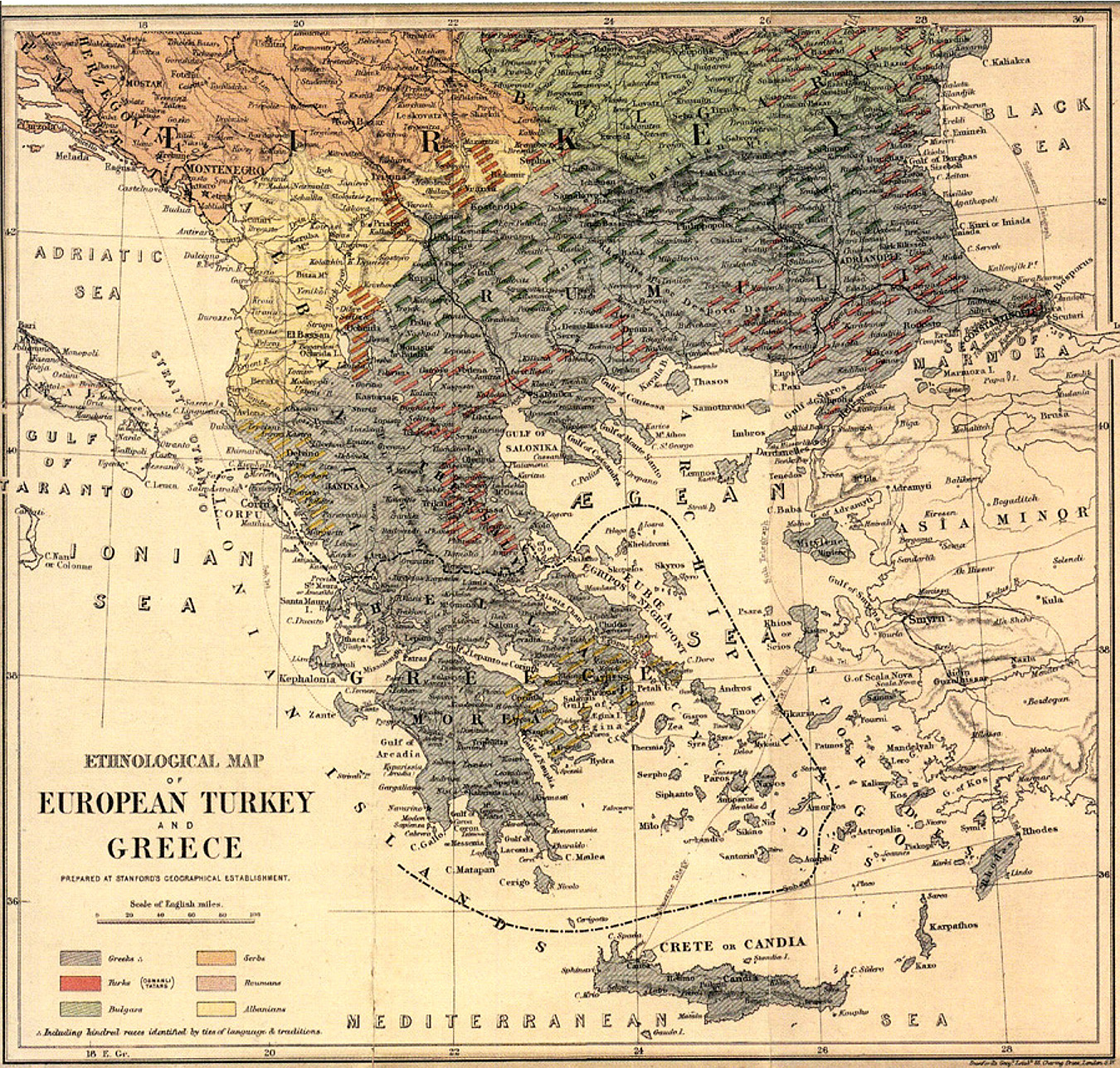
Ethnological map of the Balkans made by Edward Stanford in 1877

Born in 1827, and educated at the City of London School, Edward Stanford developed his interest in maps after being employed by Mr Trelawney Saunders at his map and stationery shop. He became a partner to Saunders in 1852 at the age of 25. In 1853, the company was dissolved, and Stanford took over the remains of the business with the intent of turning it into a map specialist. With British colonial expansion pushing the demand for maps worldwide, and being the sole specialist of maps in London, the move was both obvious and lucrative.

The name Stanfords became prominent in 1862 when his project to make the most accurate map of London possible was published. Stanford's Library Map of London is still on sale today, over 150 years later.

Company ownership remained in the family until 1947, when it was absorbed into George Philip & Son. However, in 2001 Stanfords separated from George Philip & Son and the name Stanfords is displayed on both stores and on many lines of maps and books produced by the company.

== See also ==
- Stanford's Guides (travel guide books)
