= Stanfords =

British specialist bookshop chain

Coordinates: 51.5122°N 0.1260°W

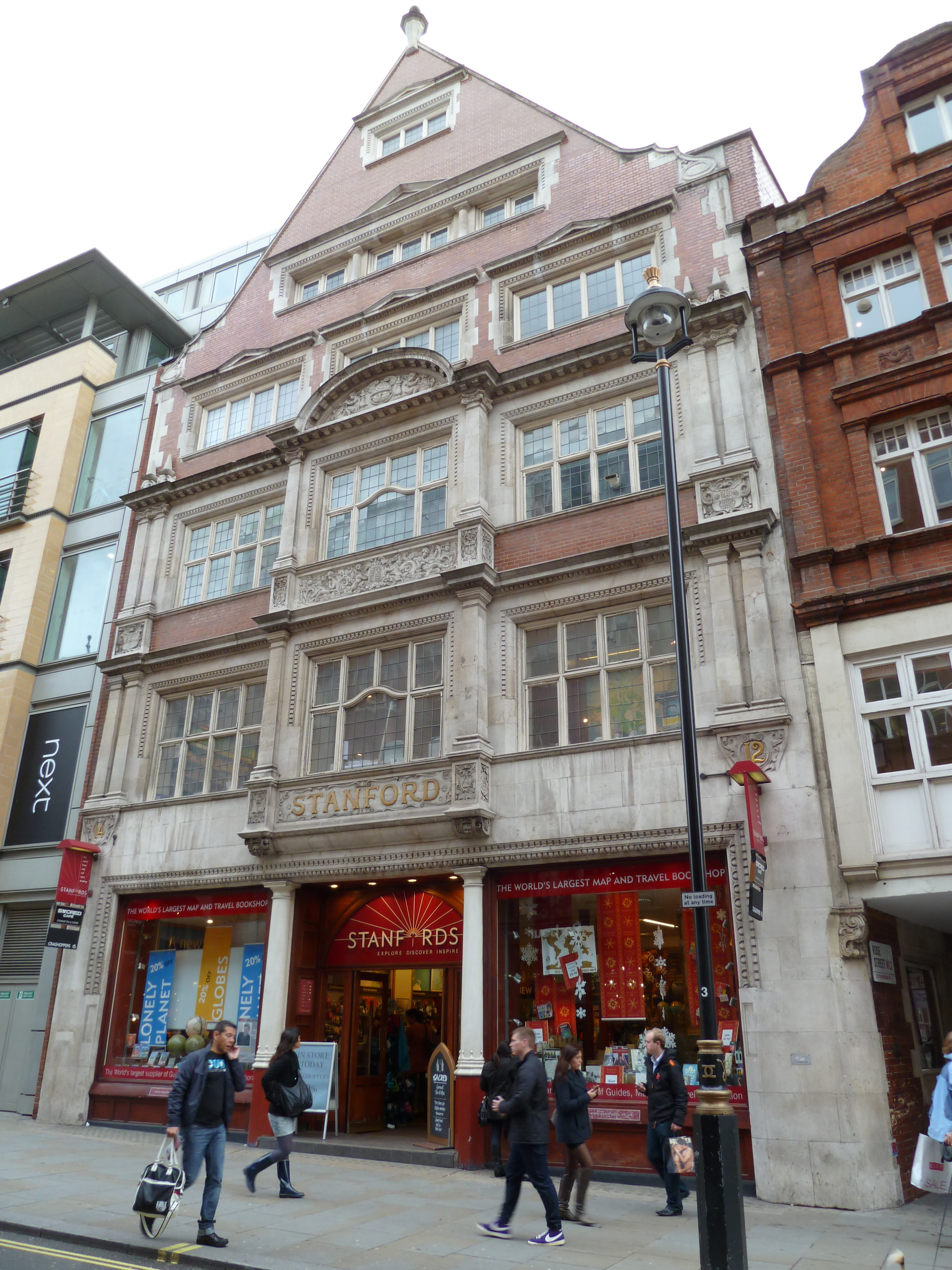
- Main frontage of the former shop in Long Acre, London, in 2011
- Type: Private
- Industry: Retail; Bookshop
- Founded: 1853
- Founder: Edward Stanford
- Headquarters: London
- Website: www.stanfords.co.uk

Stanfords is a specialist bookshop of maps and travel books in London, established in 1853 by Edward Stanford. Its collection of maps, globes, and maritime charts is considered the world's largest. It has also supplied cartography for the British Army and for James Bond films.

== History ==
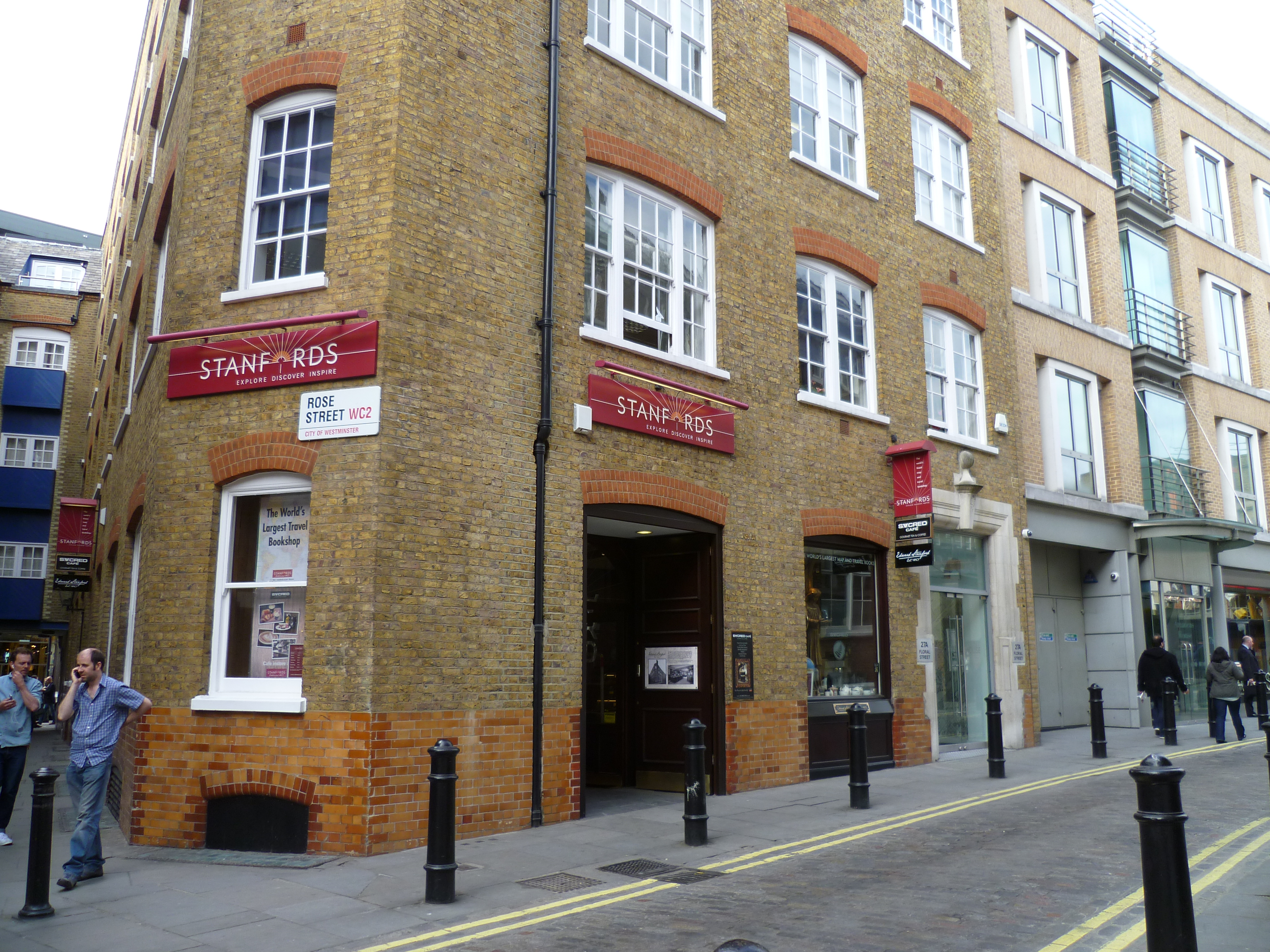
The Floral Street entrance to Stanfords

At the time of the shop's opening, it was the only mapmaker in London, with John Bolton as an in-house cartographer. Stanfords opened at the height of global exploration and colonialism, hence, cartographic works were in great demand. The shop quickly expanded to 7 and 8 Charing Cross whilst acquiring premises on Trinity Place for printing works. The store on Long Acre in Covent Garden, central London, was the location of the company's printing business before the entire operation moved there in January 1901.

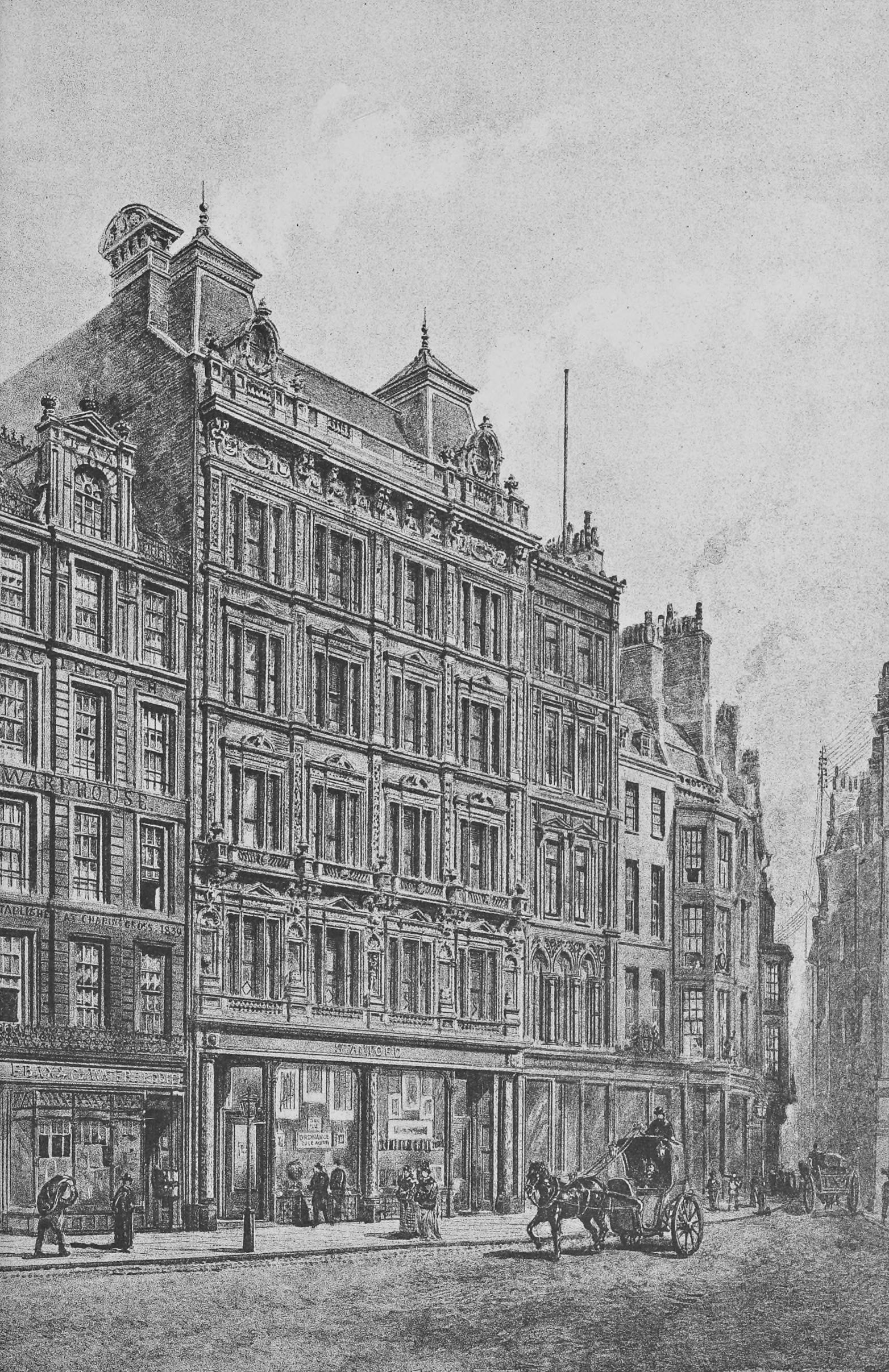
The 1888 offices at 26-27 Cockspur, designed by Thomas Barnes-Williams

Stanfords was hit by an incendiary bomb on the night of 15 April 1941 and it only survived due to the thousands of Ordnance Survey maps tightly stacked on the shop's upper floors, which kept the fire from spreading. In 1997 a second store opened in Bristol. The company also operates a division based in Manchester, providing mapping for business purposes such as large scale maps for planning applications. The bookshop in Spring Gardens was in business from 2003 to 2013.

For the shop's 150th anniversary in 2003 a National Geographic world map in vinyl, costing £40,000, was laid onto the ground floor, with maps of the Himalaya and London on the other floors. In 2015 the company took over sponsorship of the annual Dolman Travel Book Award, renaming it the Edward Stanford Travel Writing Awards. In 2018 Stanfords opened a new location at 7 Mercer Walk in Covent Garden; the Long Acre site closed in January 2019.

The shop closed in March 2020 because of loss of business from restrictions to prevent the spread of the coronavirus pandemic, but funds received from a crowdfunding appeal enabled it to reopen in 2021. On 31 January 2022 the company acquired the Bookharbour business from OneOcean, to expand its range of charts and navigation products.

== Notable clients ==
Customers past and present include David Livingstone, Robert Scott, Ernest Shackleton, Florence Nightingale, Ranulph Fiennes, Bill Bryson and Michael Palin. Stanfords also provided the charts for Amy Johnson's solo flight to Australia.

== In fiction ==
In Arthur Conan Doyle's 1902 novel, The Hound of the Baskervilles, Sherlock Holmes orders from Stanfords (named Stamfords in the story) a large-scale Ordnance Survey map of a suspected crime-scene on Dartmoor.

== See also ==
- Book trade in the United Kingdom
