= Elizabeth Donnan =

Historian of the slave trade

Elizabeth Donnan (1883–1955) was a historian of the slave trade in America and Professor Emeritus at Wellesley College from 1920 to 1949.

Donnan was born in Morrow County, Ohio to John W. Donnan and Annie Grisell. She graduated from Cornell University with a B.A/A.B. in 1908. She later credited George Lincoln Burr as an influence on her work, and in 1931 she contributed to an edited volume in his honour. In 1911 she joined the Department of Historical Research at the Carnegie Institution in Washington, where she worked under John Franklin Jameson.

She also worked as an assistant editor at the American Historical Review, the official publication of the American Historical Association, until 1919. In 1920, Donnan gained a position at Wellesley College, in Massachusetts, where she remained until her retirement in 1949, having become a Professor Emeritus of Economics. One of her most important publications was a four volume series called Documents Illustrative of the History of the Slave Trade to America, published between 1930 and 1935. After her retirement, she spent much of her time editing volumes of historical documents, such as the papers of her old colleague Jameson, which she was working on when she died in Washington on 15 March 1955. The text, titled An historian's world was published in 1956.

Her papers, notes, and writings were gifted to Yale University by her estate in 1957.
