= Sugar plantations in the Caribbean =

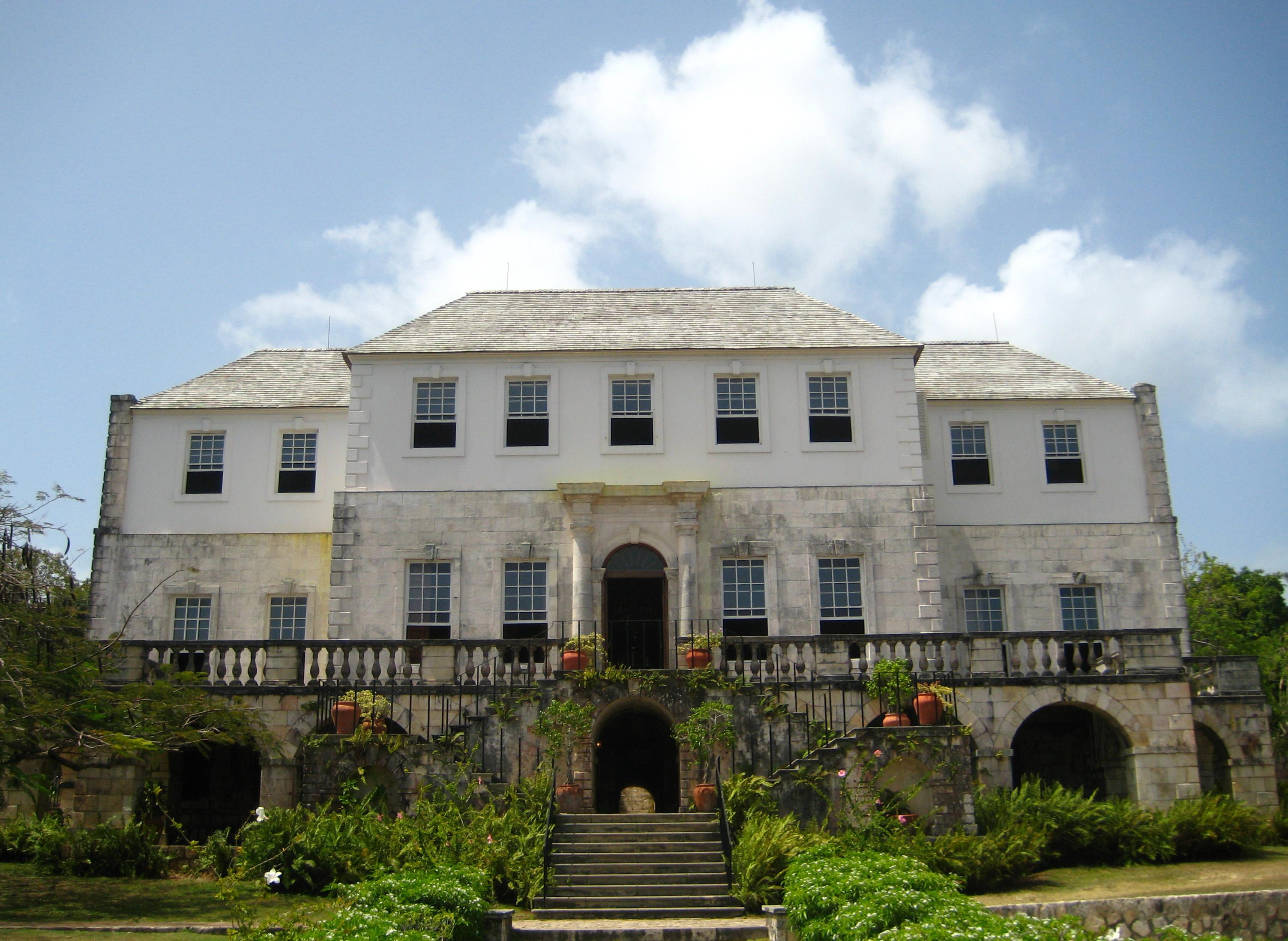
Rose Hall sugar plantation house, Jamaica

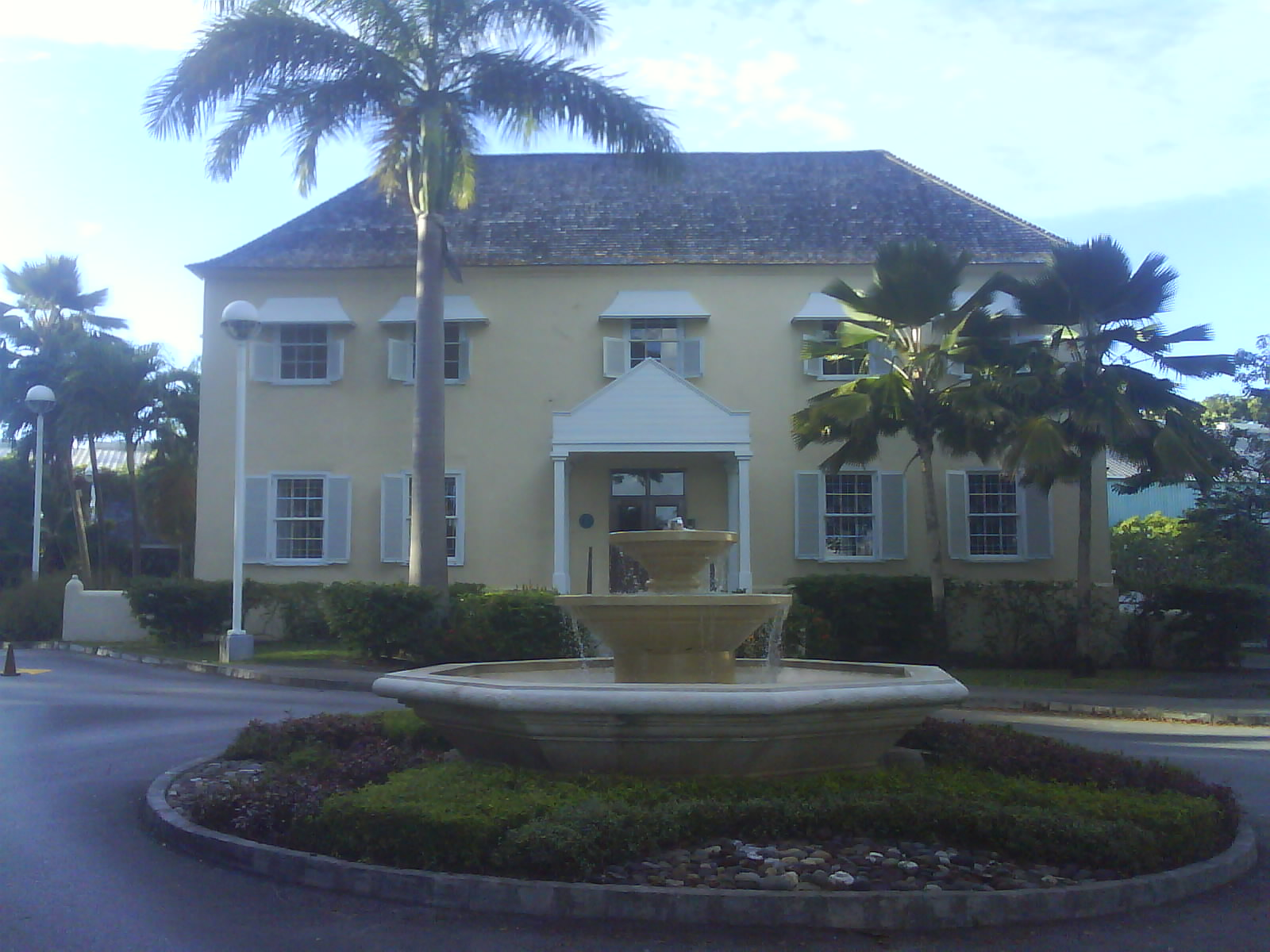
Warrens Great House, St. Michael, Barbados

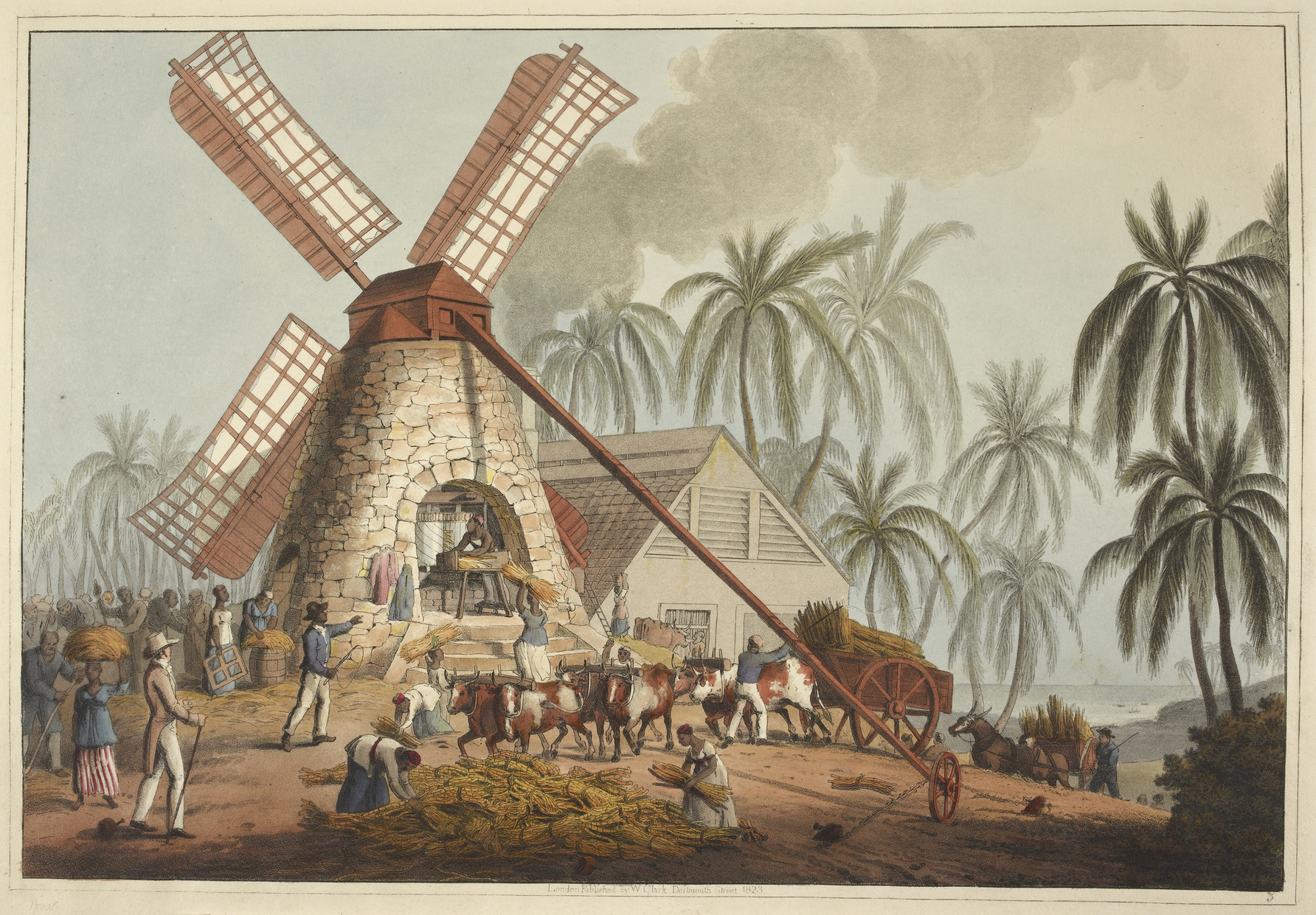
Sugar plantation in the British colony of Antigua, 1823

Sugar plantations in the Caribbean were a major part of the economy of Caribbean islands in the 18th, 19th, and 20th centuries. Most islands were covered with sugarcane fields and mills for refining the crop. The main source of labor, until the abolition of chattel slavery, was enslaved Africans. After the abolition of slavery, indentured laborers from India, China, Portugal and other places were brought to the Caribbean to work in the sugar industry. The plantations produced 80 to 90 percent of the sugar consumed in Western Europe, later supplanted by European-grown sugar beet.

== Sugar trade ==
=== Sugar cane development in the Americas ===
The Portuguese introduced sugar plantations in the 1550s off the coast of their Brazilian settlement colony, at Engenho dos Erasmos, located on the island of Sao Vincente. As the Portuguese and Spanish maintained a strong colonial presence in the Caribbean, the Iberian Peninsula amassed tremendous wealth from the cultivation of this cash crop. As other imperial states observed the economic boom catalyzed by the plantation system, they began colonizing the remaining American territories, hoping to capitalize on the lucrative cultivation and trade of natural resources.

Sugar was the most important crop throughout the Caribbean, although other crops such as coffee, indigo, and rice were also grown. Sugarcane was best grown on relatively flat land near coastal waters, where the soil was naturally yellow and fertile; mountainous parts of the islands were less likely to be used for cane cultivation. The coastal placement of commercial ports gave imperial states a geographic advantage in shipping crops throughout the transatlantic world.

Sugar created a unique political ecology—the relationship between labor, profits, and ecological consequences—in the Caribbean. Imperial powers forcefully displaced West African peoples to cultivate sugar using slave labor. Imperial conflicts arose in the Caribbean trying for political and economic control. For example, conflicts among the English, Spanish, French, Dutch, and various indigenous peoples manifested for territorial gain; regarding the region's political ecology, these European states exploited the environment's resources to such an extent that sugar production stagnated. Due to the loss of trees, needed for timber in the sugar refinement process, European imperial powers began competing and fighting over the Caribbean during the middle 17th century. This process would not have been possible without the invention of windmills to produce sugar more efficiently.

Following European settlers' entry into the Caribbean world, massive demographic changes occurred. Indigenous populations began dying at unprecedented rates with the influx of old-world diseases brought by colonists. Estimates of these population losses vary from 8.4 million to 112.5 million. This extreme decrease in native population numbers allowed greater opportunities for plantation construction and lessened the conflicts between Europeans and indigenous peoples.

=== Move from South America to the Caribbean ===
Although the sugar trade in the Americas was initially dominated by the Portuguese Empire, the Dutch–Portuguese War caused a shift which affected the further growth of the sugar trade in the Caribbean, and particularly the production of rum (made from sugarcane juice). In 1630, the Dutch seized Recife near Pernambuco in what is today Brazil (the Dutch called this New Holland after they took over) and this territory included some sugar plantations worked by African slaves who had been brought to the territory earlier. Some of the slave plantation owners were Cristão-Novo, i.e. "New Christian" (a term coined by Spanish chroniclers) Sephardic Jews who had, in response to pressure by the Portuguese Inquisition, adopted a veneer of Christianity while maintaining what traditions and practices they could. As the Dutch had provided support and asylum to Jews fleeing from Spanish Persecution, they were able and willing to incorporate Jewish plantation owners and overseers into the Dutch colonial structure. They even founded the first public synagogue in the Americas there in 1636; the Kahal Zur Israel Synagogue.

Further north in the Caribbean, the Protestant Kingdom of England was beginning to challenge the interest of the Catholic powers in the region such as the Spanish Empire and the Kingdom of France, taking control of islands including Jamaica and Barbados. Colonel James Drax who had interests in Barbados, visited Dutch Brazil in 1640 and purchased a triple-roller sugar mill and a set of copper cauldrons (used for turning sugarcane into molasses, i.e. sugarcane juice used in rum production). This technology originated in Sicily and had spread to the New World. Technological improvements aided the sugar plantations in other ways, bringing expert knowledge in cultivating rum and working as merchants, and supplying the plantations with African slaves. Barbados thus became the sugar capital of the Caribbean and the rum capital of the world. By 1706, the laws against Jews owning sugar plantations in Barbados were dropped, by which time Jewish involvement in rum production was reduced to a nominal status.

During the colonial period, the arrival of sugar culture deeply impacted the society and economy in the Caribbean. It dramatically increased the ratio of slaves to free men and increased the average size of slave plantations. Early sugar plantations made extensive use of slaves because sugar was considered a cash crop that exhibited economies of scale in cultivation; it was most efficiently grown on large plantations with many workers. Slaves from Africa were imported and made to work on the plantations. Prior to 1650 more than three-quarters of the islands' population were of European descent. In 1680, the median size of a plantation in Barbados had increased to about 60 slaves. Over the decades, the sugar plantations began expanding as the transatlantic trade continued to prosper. In 1832, the median-size plantation in Jamaica had about 150 slaves, and nearly one of every four bondsmen lived on units that had at least 250 slaves. For about 100 years, Barbados remained the richest of all the European colonies in the Caribbean region. The colony's prosperity remained regionally unmatched until sugar cane production expanded in larger colonies, such as Saint-Domingue (present-day Haiti) and Jamaica. As part of the mass sugar industry, sugarcane processing gave rise to related commodities such as rum, molasses, and falernum.

The West India Interest was formed in the 1740s, when the British merchants joined with the West Indian sugar planters. The British and West Indies shared profits and needs. This organization was the first sugar-trading organization which had a large voice in Parliament. In the 1740s, Jamaica and Saint Domingue became the world's main sugar producers. Production was further increased in Saint Domingue by using an irrigation system that French engineers built. The engineers also built reservoirs, diversion dams, levees, aqueducts, and canals. In addition, they improved their mills and used varieties of cane and grasses.

=== 19th century ===
Sugarcane plantation in Haiti, 1820 illustration

According to a 2021 study, "historical property rights institutions [in Haiti] created high transaction costs for converting land to cane production", relative to the other Caribbean countries. As a result, Haiti lost its place as the leading sugar producer in the world. After the end of slavery in Saint Domingue at the turn of the 19th century, with the Haitian Revolution, Cuba became the most substantial sugar plantation colony in the Caribbean, outperforming the British islands. The increase in production was also in part because of advances in technology, as this was around the time when the modern sugar mill was beginning to circulate. This was a result of more dependence on the quality of work, rather than quantity due to the decrease in easy access to free labor. In the 19th century, industry dedicated to the production of sugar dominated Martinique, Grenada, Jamaica, Saint Croix, Barbados, the Leeward Islands, Saint Domingue (Haiti), Cuba, as well as many other islands that had been run by French, British, or Spanish owners. During the late 19th and 20th centuries, the sugar cane industry came to dominate Puerto Rico's economy, both under the colonial rule of Spain and under the United States.

After slavery, sugar plantations used a variety of forms of labour including workers imported from colonial India and Southern China working as indentured servants on European owned plantations (coolie). In the 20th century, large-scale sugar production using wage labour continued in many parts of the region.

== Slavery ==
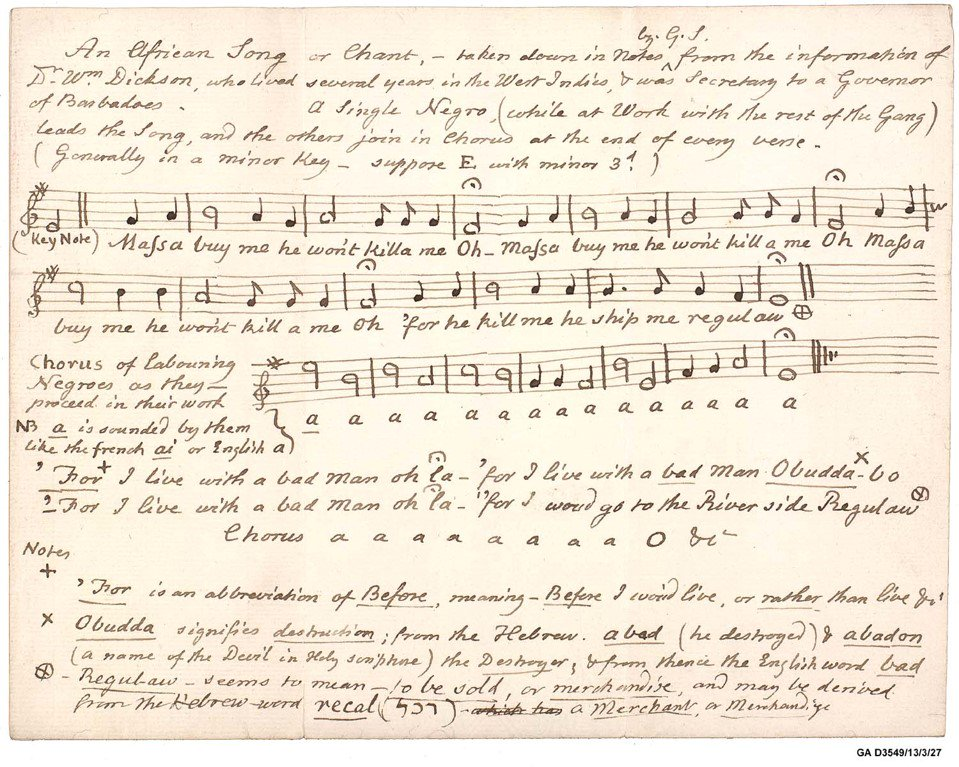
An African Song or Chant from Barbados, a transcribed work song from the late 18th century that has been given UNESCO Memory of the World status

The Europeans forced the indigenous peoples of various Caribbean islands to provide the physical labor necessary for the production of sugarcane. The indigenous populations were decimated by violence and illness after initial colonization introduced diseases that were foreign and deadly to native inhabitants. In order to continue production of the crop, Europeans first transported indentured servants, mostly from Ireland and Britain; African slaves were introduced to the islands shortly after through the Trans-Atlantic slave trade, benefitting from the already extensive investement that European colonial empires had placed in it. The time at which this happened varies from island to island depending on available indigenous labor and the attrition that they and the indentured servants suffered.

Sugarcane harvesting during the time of colonization in the Caribbean was a labor-intensive process. Firstly, it was harvested by hand, and the sucrose inside needed to be harvested quickly to not be spoiled. To extract the juice, it must be chopped, ground, pressed, pounded, or soaked in liquid before it is heated. Once heated, the liquids evaporate until only the crystals remain. Each step is labor-intensive and requires technical knowledge and skill. These tasks were performed by enslaved individuals until emancipation.

Slavery involved a series of interconnected relationships and power dynamics between the enslaved and the more elite population on the island. Women were integral in the social dynamic of the plantations and in the labor. "There was a gendering of health, wealth and energy on sugar plantations. The majority of field slaves were women and the majority of women worked in the field.". Women were heavily involved in the labor of the plantations and were also having children and going to work in the fields at the same time. The Newton Slave Burial Ground showed the evidence of this brutality towards enslaved women, "which may point towards greater levels of interpersonal abuse or even domestic violence for women".

In 1807 Parliament passed the Slave Trade Act prohibiting the trade of slaves in the British Empire. This act extended to the Caribbean plantations under British control. Without the labor influx of slaves through the Trans-Atlantic slave trade, the system became harder to maintain. Years later, in 1838, more than half a million people in the Caribbean were emancipated from slavery as a result of the 1833 Emancipation Bill.

== Environmental impact ==
The sugarcane industry had an adverse impact on the environment as this industry grew in Caribbean countries. These included the destruction of forests, water pollution, and loss of fertility and erosion of soils. These problems were seen on various different scales in the Dominican Republic in the 16th century; Martinique in the 17th century; Jamaica and Haiti in the 18th century; and Cuba and Puerto Rico in the 19th century.

In 1492, Christopher Columbus arrived on the northern coast of Hispaniola, and Spanish colonization began to establish itself. By the late 16th century, demand and production for sugar, one of the central exports of the island, had increased. Much of the indigenous population suffered from disease and famine, and many pre-colonial smaller-scale farms were replaced by larger-scale farms. These farms required more land and moist soil close to water sources, resulting in deforestation and water pollution.

During the 17th century in the Lesser Antilles, many of the islands suffered ecological losses after the introduction of monoculture for sugar plantations. On Nevis in particular, the island was nearly deforested during the mid-17th century, and much of the topsoil quality deteriorated as a result of a large influx of plantations. Although these nations have taken measures to mitigate the impacts of the sugar revolution, in some there are still traces of what historian Reinaldo Funes Monzote, describes as a "serious deterioration" of the natural environment, with socio-economic consequences. The impacts concerning irrigation and pollution of water runoff are seen as the most profound issues in sugar cane cultivation.

== See also ==
- Colonial molasses trade
- Casa-grande in Brazil
- Sugar production in the Danish West Indies
- Slavery in the British and French Caribbean
- Valle de los Ingenios – Valley of the Sugar Mills, Cuba
- London Society of West India Planters and Merchants
- Centre for the Study of the Legacies of British Slave-ownership
- "Habitations", French colonial plantations (fr)
