= Caribbean Commission =

The Caribbean Commission, originally the Anglo-American Caribbean Commission, was established on 9 March 1942 to improve the common social and economic problems of the region and deal with wartime issues. In 1946, the governments of the United States and United Kingdom invited France and the Netherlands to join, creating the Caribbean Commission with a central secretariat in Port-of-Spain, Trinidad and Tobago.

The so-called 'West-Indian Conferences' were held in 1944 (Barbados), 1946 (St. Thomas), 1948 (Guadeloupe), 1950 (Curaçao), 1952 (Jamaica), 1955 Porto Rico, 1957 (Curacao), 1959 (St. Thomas).

== See also ==
- Moyne Commission
