= Stanford's Guides =

Travel guide series

Stanford's Guides (est. 1850s) were a series of travel guide books to England and elsewhere published by Edward Stanford of London.

== List of Stanford's Guides by geographic coverage ==
=== Americas ===
- Catherine Parr Strickland Traill (1860), Canadian settler's guide, London: E. Stanford, ISBN 0665228600, OL 24363687M
- Tourist's Guide Book to the United States and Canada, London: Edward Stanford, 1884
- Harvey J. Philpot (1871), Guide book to the Canadian Dominion, London: E. Stanford, OCLC 8601809, OL 6599727M
- Algernon Edward Aspinall (1907), Pocket Guide to the West Indies, London: E. Stanford, OCLC 1902621, OL 6987761M

=== England ===
- Mackenzie Walcott (1860), Guide to the Cathedrals of the United Kingdom, London: Edward Stanford
- G. Phillips Bevan (1884), Tourist's Guide to the Channel Islands, Edward Stanford, OCLC 55576538, OL 20616231M

==== East Midlands region ====
- J. Charles Cox (1878), Tourist's Guide to Derbyshire, London: E. Stanford
- C.H.J. Anderson (1880), Lincoln Pocket Guide
- R.N. Worth (1889), Tourist's Guide to Worcestershire, London: Edward Stanford

==== East of England region ====
- Mackenzie E.C. Walcott (1861), East coast of England from the Thames to the Tweed
- Edward Walford (1882), Tourist's Guide to Essex, London: Edward Stanford
- Tourist's Guide to the County of Norfolk, London: Edward Stanford, 1885
- A.J. Foster (1889), Tourist's Guide to Bedfordshire, London: Edward Stanford
- A.G. Hill (1892), Edward Conybeare (ed.), Tourist's Guide to the County of Cambridge (2nd ed.), London: Edward Stanford
- Albert John Foster (1896), Tourist's Guide to Hertfordshire (2nd ed.), London: E. Stanford

==== London region ====
- Stanford's New London Guide, London: Edward Stanford, 1860
- W.J. Loftie (1881), Tourist's Guide through London, London: Edward Stanford

==== North West England region ====
- Mackenzie E.C. Walcott (1860), Guide to the mountains, lakes and north-west coast of England
- Henry Irwin Jenkinson (1879), Tourists' Guide to the English Lake District, Edward Stanford, OCLC 19700244, OL 20590274M

==== South East England region ====
- Mackenzie Walcott (1859), Guide to the Coast of Sussex, London: Edward Stanford
- Mackenzie Walcott (1859), Guide to the South Coast of England, London: Edward Stanford
- Edmund Venables (1860), Guide to the Isle of Wight, London: Edward Stanford
- Handbook to the County of Kent, E. Stanford, 1878
  - 1885 ed.
- G. Phillips Bevan (1881), Tourist's Guide to Hampshire, including the Isle of Wight, London: Edward Stanford + Index
- Edward Walford (1882), Tourist's Guide to Berkshire, London: Edward Stanford
- G. Phillips Bevan (1891), R.N. Worth (ed.), Tourist's Guide to the County of Surrey (4th ed.), London: Edward Stanford

==== South West England region ====
- Mackenzie Walcott (1859), Guide to the Coasts of Devon & Cornwall, London: Edward Stanford
- Mackenzie Walcott (1859), Guide to the Coasts of Hants & Dorset, London: Edward Stanford
- Walter H. Tregellas (1878), Tourist's Guide to Cornwall and the Scilly Isles, London: E. Stanford, OL 7216928M
- R.N. Worth (1880), Tourist's Guide to North Devon and the Exmoor district, Edward Stanford, OCLC 35309276, OL 23460003M
- R.N. Worth (1882), Tourist's Guide to Dorsetshire, Edward Stanford
- R.N. Worth (1883), Tourist's Guide to South Devon (3rd ed.), London: Edward Stanford
- R.N. Worth (1885), Tourist's Guide to Somersetshire (2nd ed.), E. Stanford, OCLC 78075179, OL 23457333M
  - 1888 ed.

==== West Midlands region ====
- G. Phillips Bevan (1894), Tourist's Guide to Warwickshire (2nd ed.), London: Edward Stanford
- Tourist's Guide to the Wye and Its Neighbourhood, 1892 + Index

==== Yorkshire and the Humber region ====
- G. Phillips Bevan (1884), Tourist's Guide to the East and North Ridings of Yorkshire (3rd ed.), London: Edward Stanford
- Tourist's Guide to the West Riding of Yorkshire, 1889

=== France ===
- Stanford's Paris guide, 1862
  - 1858 ed.

=== Switzerland ===
- M. Caviezel (1877), Tourist's Guide to the Upper Engadine, Translated from German by A.M.H., London: E. Stanford

== List of Stanford's Guides by date of publication ==
=== 1850s-1860s ===
- Mackenzie Walcott (1859), Guide to the Coasts of Devon & Cornwall, London: Edward Stanford
- Mackenzie Walcott (1859), Guide to the Coasts of Hants & Dorset, London: Edward Stanford
- Mackenzie Walcott (1859), Guide to the Coast of Sussex, London: Edward Stanford
- Mackenzie Walcott (1859), Guide to the South Coast of England, London: Edward Stanford
- Catherine Parr Strickland Traill (1860), Canadian settler's guide, London: E. Stanford, ISBN 0665228600, OL 24363687M
- Mackenzie Walcott (1860), Guide to the Cathedrals of the United Kingdom, London: Edward Stanford
- Edmund Venables (1860), Guide to the Isle of Wight, London: Edward Stanford
- Stanford's New London Guide, London: Edward Stanford, 1860
- Mackenzie E.C. Walcott (1860), Guide to the mountains, lakes and north-west coast of England
- Mackenzie E.C. Walcott (1861), East coast of England from the Thames to the Tweed
- Stanford's Paris guide, 1862
  - 1858 ed.

=== 1870s-1880s ===
- Harvey J. Philpot (1871), Guide book to the Canadian Dominion, London: E. Stanford, OCLC 8601809, OL 6599727M
- M. Caviezel (1877), Tourist's Guide to the Upper Engadine, Translated from German by A.M.H., London: E. Stanford
- Handbook to the County of Kent, E. Stanford, 1878
  - 1885 ed.
- Walter H. Tregellas (1878), Tourist's Guide to Cornwall and the Scilly Isles, London: E. Stanford, OL 7216928M
- J. Charles Cox (1878), Tourist's Guide to Derbyshire, London: E. Stanford
- Henry Irwin Jenkinson (1879), Tourists' Guide to the English Lake District, Edward Stanford, OCLC 19700244, OL 20590274M
- C.H.J. Anderson (1880), Lincoln Pocket Guide
- R.N. Worth (1880), Tourist's Guide to North Devon and the Exmoor district, Edward Stanford, OCLC 35309276, OL 23460003M
- Tourist's Guide to Hampshire, including the Isle of Wight, 1881
- W.J. Loftie (1881), Tourist's Guide through London, London: Edward Stanford
- Edward Walford (1882), Tourist's Guide to Berkshire, London: Edward Stanford
- R.N. Worth (1882), Tourist's Guide to Dorsetshire, Edward Stanford
- Edward Walford (1882), Tourist's Guide to Essex, London: Edward Stanford
- R.N. Worth (1883), Tourist's Guide to South Devon (3rd ed.), London: Edward Stanford
- G. Phillips Bevan (1884), Tourist's Guide to the Channel Islands, Edward Stanford, OCLC 55576538, OL 20616231M
- G. Phillips Bevan (1884), Tourist's Guide to the East and North Ridings of Yorkshire (3rd ed.), London: Edward Stanford
- Tourist's Guide Book to the United States and Canada, London: Edward Stanford, 1884
- Tourist's Guide to the County of Norfolk, London: Edward Stanford, 1885
- R.N. Worth (1885), Tourist's Guide to Somersetshire (2nd ed.), E. Stanford, OCLC 78075179, OL 23457333M
  - 1888 ed.
- A.J. Foster (1889), Tourist's Guide to Bedfordshire, London: Edward Stanford
- Tourist's Guide to the West Riding of Yorkshire, 1889
- R.N. Worth (1889) Tourist's Guide to Worcestershire, London: Edward Stanford

=== 1890s-1900s ===
- G. Phillips Bevan (1891), R.N. Worth (ed.), Tourist's Guide to the County of Surrey (4th ed.), London: Edward Stanford
- A.G. Hill (1892), Edward Conybeare (ed.), Tourist's Guide to the County of Cambridge (2nd ed.), London: Edward Stanford
- Tourist's Guide to the Wye and Its Neighbourhood, 1892
- G. Phillips Bevan (1894), Tourist's Guide to Warwickshire (2nd ed.), London: Edward Stanford
- Albert John Foster (1896), Tourist's Guide to Hertfordshire (2nd ed.), London: E. Stanford
- Algernon Edward Aspinall (1907), Pocket Guide to the West Indies, London: E. Stanford, OCLC 1902621, OL 6987761M
