= Slavocracy =

Society ruled by slaveowners

A slavocracy (also known as a plantocracy) is a society whose ruling class is primarily composed of slaveowners. The concept of a slavocracy emerged during the early modern period, when the European colonisation of the Americas led the establishment of several colonies which operated on plantation economies with the forced labor of people indigenous to the land and Africans who were enslaved. The term "slavocracy" was coined by abolitionists in the Northern United States as a pejorative term for the influence enslavers held in the US. The American slavocracy, which was primarily based in the Southern United States, played a major role in the history of the US.

Slavocracies are noted by historians to have existed across different regions of the Americas, most prominently in the West Indies, Southern United States and the Empire of Brazil. The slavocracy of the American South, "which saw the United States as slavery’s most powerful champion", played a major role in shaping the foreign policy of the United States during the late 18th and 19th centuries. During the late 18th and early 19th centuries, slavocracies attempted to resist the growing movement to abolish slavery, though such efforts were ultimately unsuccessful. In the 19th century, the slavocracies in Brazil and Spanish Cuba responded to industrial and socio-economic modernisation in different ways; the Brazilian slavocracy opposed modernisation while their Cuban counterpart supported efforts to modernise the economy to boost profits derived from slavery.

== See also ==
- Confederate States of America
- London Society of West India Planters and Merchants
- Slave Power, a term used by American abolitionists in the 1840s and 1850s to argue that Southern agrarian interests wielded disproportionate political power in the United States
- Slavery in Brazil
- Sugar plantations in the Caribbean
- Maroon (people)
- American gentry
- Planter class

== Sources ==
- B.W. Higman. "The West India Interest in Parliament," Historical Studies (1967), 13: pp. 1–19.
- See the historical journal: Plantation Society in the Americas for a host of pertinent articles.
- Steel, Mark James (PhD Dissertation). Power, Prejudice and Profit: the World View of the Jamaican Slaveowning Elite, 1788-1834, (University of Liverpool Press, Liverpool 1988).
- Luster, Robert Edward (PhD Dissertation). The Amelioration of the Slaves in the British Empire, 1790-1833 (New York University Press, 1998).
