= Trinidadians and Tobagonians =

People identified with the country of Trinidad and Tobago

- National Flag of Trinidad and Tobago

Total population
- c. 1.7 million

Regions with significant populations
- Trinidad and Tobago 1,405,646 (2022)
- United States: 223,639 (2013 est.)
- Canada: 68,225 (2011)
- United Kingdom: 25,000 (2013 est.)

Languages
- Primary languages: Trinidadian and Tobagonian English; Trinidadian English Creole; Tobagonian English Creole; Minority/Heritage languages: Trinidadian Hindustani; Trinidadian French-Creole; Spanish; Chinese; Portuguese; French; Arabic; others

Religion
- Christianity; Hinduism; Islam; Spiritual Baptist; Baháʼí; Orisha-Shango; Vodunu-RadaRastafari; Afro-American religions; Buddhism; Chinese folk religions; Sikhism; Judaism; others

Related ethnic groups
- Indo-Trinidadians and Tobagonians; Afro–Trinidadians and Tobagonians; Chinese Trinidadians and Tobagonians; European Trinidadians and Tobagonians; Portuguese Trinidadians and Tobagonians; Creoles-Mulatto; Dougla; Cocoa panyols; Island Caribs; Lokono; Arawak; Kalina; Arabs; Venezuelans; Hispanics-Latin Americans; Trinidadian and Tobagonian Americans; Trinidadian and Tobagonian Canadians; Trinidadian and Tobagonian British; Indo-Caribbean; Indo-Caribbean Americans; British Indo-Caribbean; Afro-Caribbean; British Afro-Caribbean; Caribbean people; Caribbean Americans

Trinidadians and Tobagonians, colloquially known as Trinis or Trinbagonians, are the people who are identified with the country of Trinidad and Tobago. The population of Trinidad is notably diverse, with approximately 35% Indo-Trinidadian, 34% Afro-Trinidadian, and 22.8% Mixed (particularly Dougla being 7.6%). The country is home to people of many different national, ethnic, and religious origins. As a result, Trinidadians do not equate their nationality with race and ethnicity, but with citizenship, identification with the islands as whole, or either Trinidad or Tobago specifically. Although citizens make up the majority of Trinidadians, there is a substantial number of Trinidadian expatriates, dual citizens and descendants living worldwide, chiefly elsewhere in the Anglosphere.

== Population ==
The total population of Trinidad and Tobago was 1,328,019 according to the 2011 census, an increase of 5.2 per cent since the 2000 census. According to the 2012 revision of the World Population Prospects the total population was estimated at 1,328,000 in 2010, compared to only 646,000 in 1950. The proportion of children below the age of 15 in 2010 was 20.7 per cent, 71 per cent was between 15 and 65 years of age, while 8.3 per cent was 65 years or older.

== Ethnic groups ==
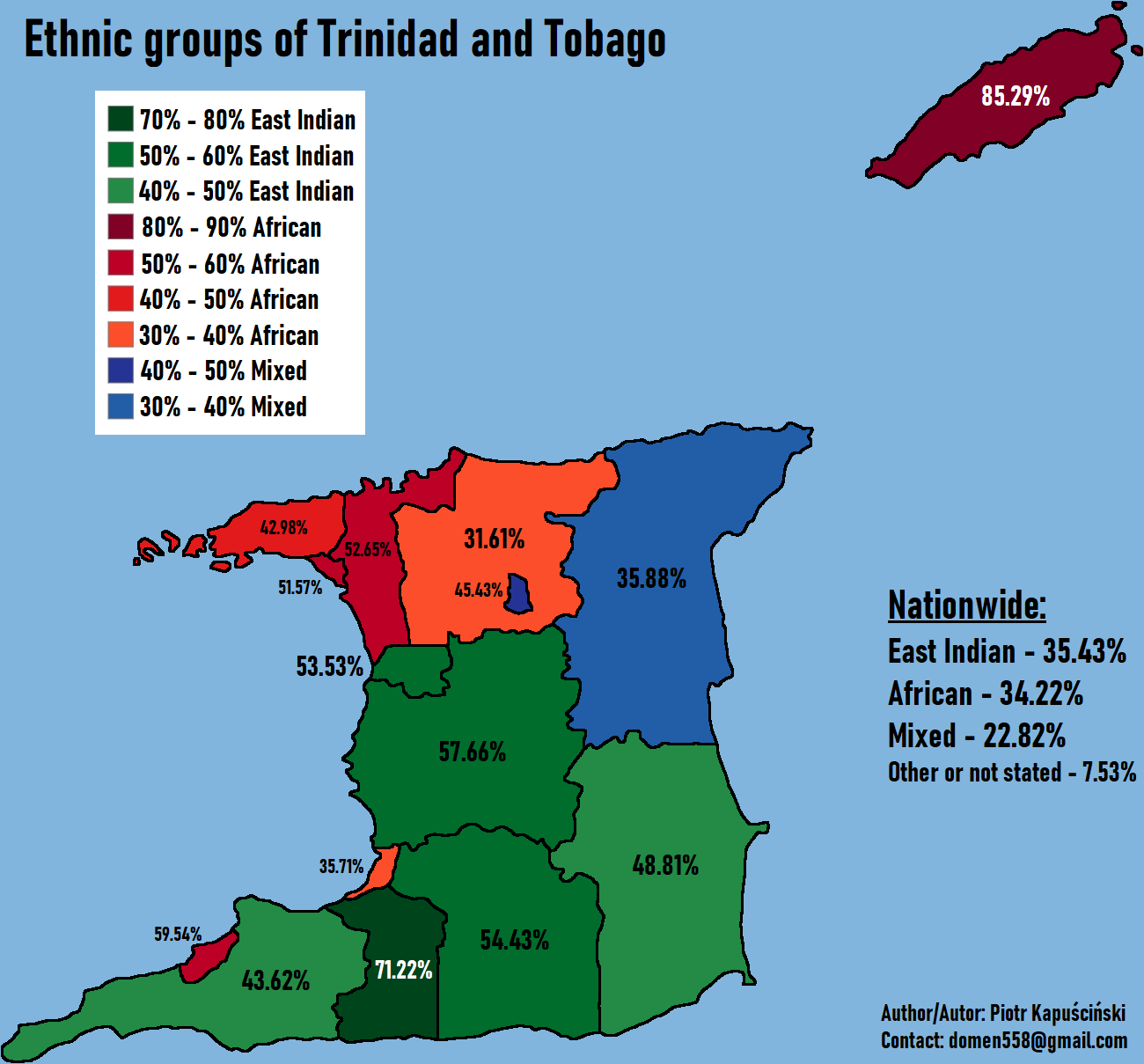
Distribution of ethnic groups of Trinidad and Tobago according to the 2011 census

The ethnic composition of Trinidad and Tobago reflects a history of conquest and immigration. While the earliest inhabitants were of Amerindian heritage, since the 20th century the two dominant groups in the country were those of South Asian and of African heritage.

=== Indians-South Asian ===
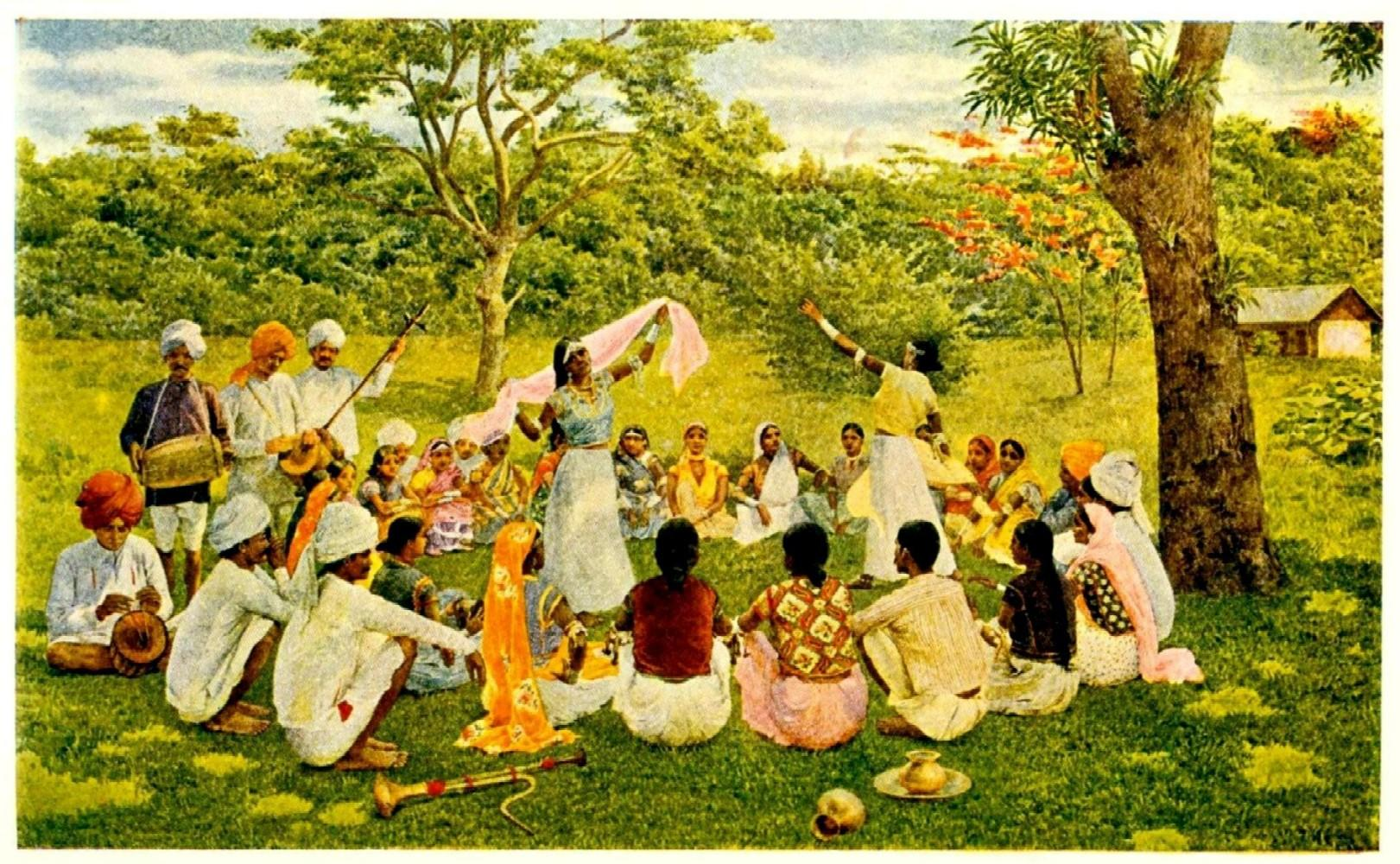
Early Indians in Trinidad

Indo-Trinidadians and Tobagonians make up the country's largest ethnic group (approximately 35.43 percent). They are primarily descendants from indentured workers from South Asia and India, brought to replace freed African slaves who refused to continue working on the sugar plantations from other Islands. Through cultural preservation residents of Indian descent continue to maintain the religions and traditions from their ancestral homeland.

=== Sub-Saharan African ===
Afro–Trinidadians and Tobagonians make up the country's second largest ethnic group, with approximately 34.22 percent of the population. Afro-Trinidadians are the descendants of enslaved West and Central Africans brought to the Trinidad and Tobago in the last few years of the Spanish colonial era and the beginning of the English colonial period through the trans-Atlantic slave trade.

=== Other origins ===
Chinese, Amerindians, Europeans, Arabs, Hispanic/Latinos, Douglas (mixed Indian and African), multiracial people, and Jews, reside in Trinidad and Tobago. White Trinidadians are descendants of Spanish, British, French, Corsican, Portuguese or German settlers. A small mixed indigenous Carib population is present around the Santa Rosa Carib Community. There is also a Cocoa panyol population who are of Spanish, indigenous, and African descent who came from Venezuela between the late 19th and early 20th century to work on the cocoa estates.

== Emigration ==
Emigration from Trinidad and Tobago, as with other Caribbean nations, has historically been high; most emigrants go to the United States, Canada, and Britain. Emigration has continued, albeit at a lower rate, even as the birth-rate sharply dropped to levels typical of industrialised countries. Largely because of this phenomenon, as of 2011, Trinidad and Tobago has been experiencing a low population growth rate (0.48 per cent).

== See also ==
- Demographics of Trinidad and Tobago
- Prime Ministers of Trinidad and Tobago
- Arab
- Hispanic-Latino
- Cocoa panyols
- Culture of Trinidad and Tobago
- Trinidadian and Tobagonian Americans
