= Trinidadian and Tobagonian Americans =

Americans of Trinidadian and Tobagonian birth or descent

Total population
- 218,783 (2019)

Regions with significant populations
- Connecticut, Florida, Maryland, New Jersey and New York

Languages
- English (American English, Trinidadian English, Trinidadian English Creole, Tobagonian English Creole)

Religion
- Christianity, Hinduism, Islam

Related ethnic groups
- Trinidadians and Tobagonians, Arawak, West Africans, Caribbean Americans, Indo–Trinidadians and Tobagonians, Afro–Trinidadians and Tobagonians, Chinese Trinidadians and Tobagonians, European Trinidadian and Tobagonian, Indian Americans, South Asian Americans, Indo-Caribbean Americans, Guyanese Americans, Surinamese Americans, African Americans, Chinese Americans, European Americans, Native Americans, Indigenous Trinidadians

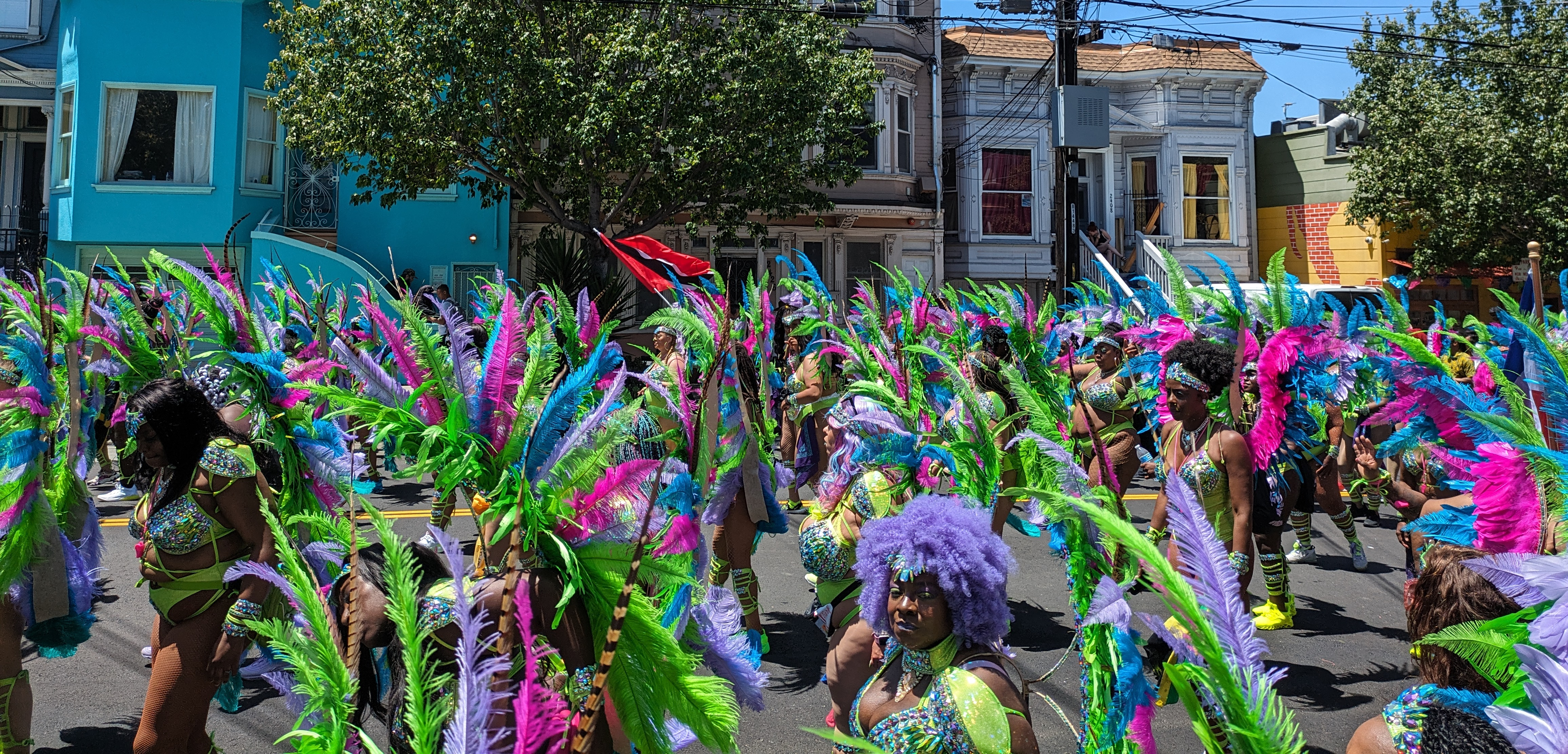
Trinidad and Tobago represented at Carnaval San Francisco in 2024

Trinidadian and Tobagonian Americans (also known as Trinidadian Americans, Tobagonian Americans and Trinbagonian Americans) are people with Trinidadian and Tobagonian ancestry or immigrants who were born in Trinidad and Tobago. Trinidad and Tobago is home to people of many different national, ethnic and religious origins. As a result, people of Trinidadian and Tobagonian descent do not equate their nationality with ethnicity. The largest proportion of Trinidadians lives in the New York area and parts of Western New York, with other large communities located in Connecticut, Florida, Maryland and New Jersey. There are more than 223,639 Trinbagonian Americans living in the United States.

== Historical immigration ==
=== First wave of Trinidadians and Tobagonians in America ===
Trinidadians, largely Afro-Trinidadians, began immigrating to the United States in the 19th century.

Trinidadian and Tobagonian immigration to the United States, which dates back to the 17th century, was spasmodic and is best studied in relation to the major waves of Caribbean immigration. The first documented account of black immigration to the United States from the Caribbean dates back to 1619, when a small group of voluntary indentured workers arrived in Jamestown, Virginia, on a Dutch frigate. The immigrants worked as free people until 1629 when a Portuguese vessel arrived with the first shipload of blacks captured off the west coast of Africa. In the 1640s Virginia and other states began instituting laws that took away the freedom of blacks and redefined them as chattel or personal property. Trinidad, like many other islands in the British West Indies, served as a clearinghouse for slaves en route to North America. The region also acted as a "seasoning camp" where newly arrived blacks were "broken-in" psychologically and physically to a life of slavery, as well as a place where they acquired biological resistance to deadly European diseases.

=== Second wave ===
From 1966 to 1970, 23,367 Trinidadian and Tobagonian immigrants, primarily from the educated elite and rural poor classes, legally migrated to the United States. From 1971 to 1975, the figure climbed to 33,278. It dropped to 28,498 from 1976 to 1980, and only half that amount between 1981 and 1984, when the Reagan administration began placing greater restrictions on U.S. immigration policy. Less than 2,300 Trinidadian and Tobagonian immigrants arrived in 1984 and that number scarcely increased during President Reagan's second term of office. A few European-Trinidadians migrated during the latter half of the 20th century, primarily because they were losing their grip on political power in the Republic with the rise of nationalism and independence. The majority of those immigrants came to the United States because Britain had restricted immigration from the Commonwealth islands to the British Isles. A larger number migrated in the late 1980s when oil prices fell, sending the Republic into a deep recession. Trinidadians and Tobagonians are now the second largest group of English-speaking West Indian immigrants in the United States.

== US communities with high percentages of people of Trinidadian and Tobagonian ancestry ==
The top US communities with the highest percentage of people claiming Trinidadian-Tobagonian ancestry are:

1. Lakeview, New York and Naranja, Florida 2.70%
2. South Floral Park, New York 2.50%
3. Mount Rainier, Maryland 2.30%
4. Orange, New Jersey and Blue Hills, Connecticut 2.20%
5. Brooklyn, New York 2.10%
6. Chillum, Maryland 2.00%
7. Roosevelt, New York 1.90%
8. Landover Hills, Maryland and Cheverly, Maryland 1.60%
9. Langley Park, Maryland 1.50%
10. Riverdale Park, Maryland 1.40%
11. North Amityville, New York, Surfside, Florida and Gordon Heights, New York 1.30%
12. Neptune City, New Jersey, Wheatley Heights, New York and Miramar, Florida 1.20%
13. Cottage City, Maryland, Hempstead, New York, North Valley Stream, New York, Uniondale, New York, North Lauderdale, Florida, Harrington Park, New Jersey and Beltsville, Maryland 1.10%
14. Bloomfield, Connecticut and Central Islip, New York 1.00%

== See also ==
- Trinidad and Tobago–United States relations
- African Americans
- Indo-Caribbean Americans
- West Indian Americans
- Trinidadian Canadians
- Trinidadian British
- Caribbean immigration to New York City
- History of Caribbean Americans in Baltimore
