= Languages of Trinidad and Tobago =

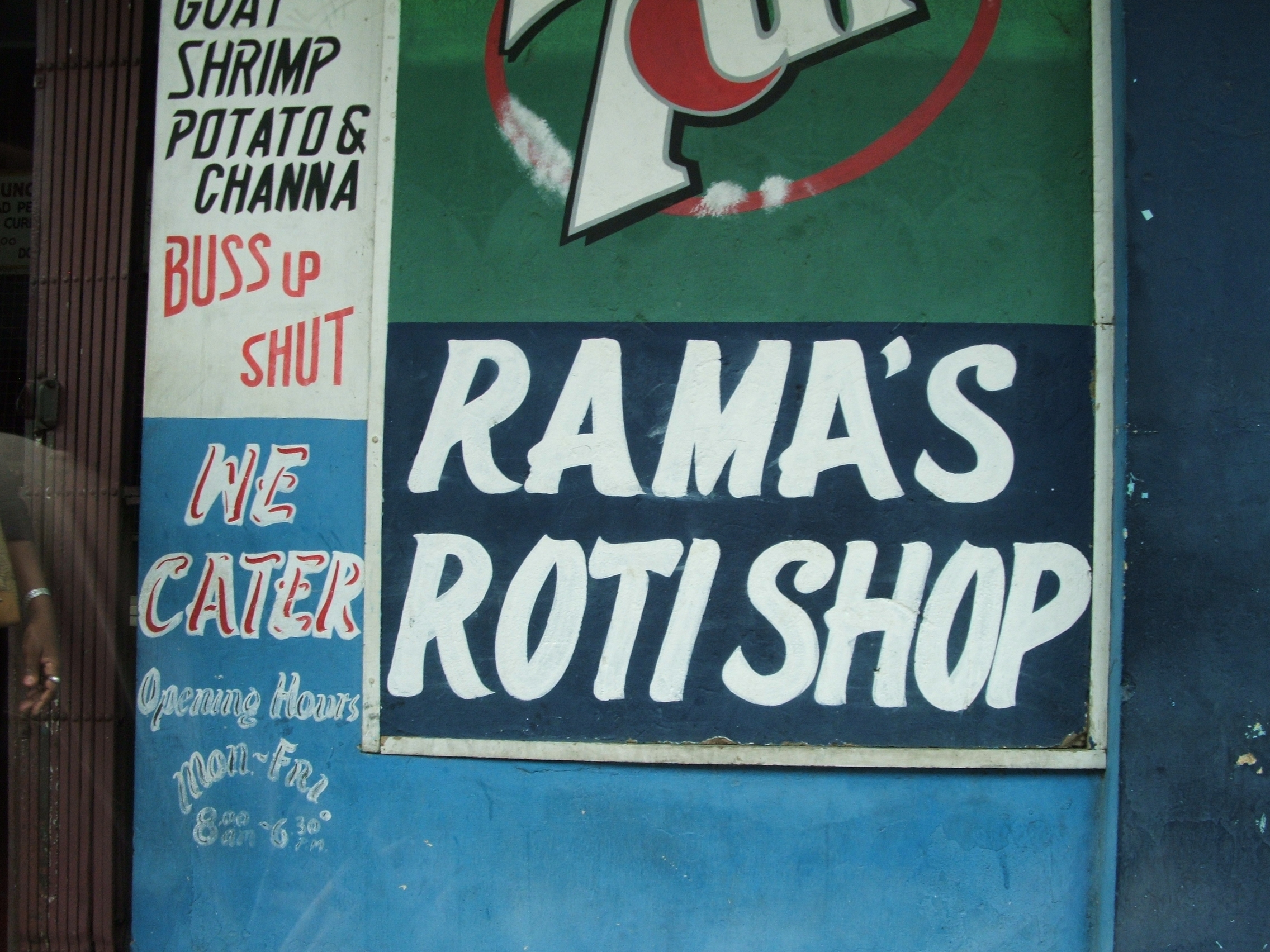
- Roti shop sign in English in Port of Spain; buss up shut is a Creole name for paratha.
- Official: English
- Indigenous: Carib, Yaio, Shebaya, Warao (all extinct)
- Vernacular: Trinidadian Creole and Tobagonian Creole
- Minority: Spanish, Trinidadian Hindustani, Trinidadian French-Creole (Patois), Chinese, Yoruba, Arabic, Portuguese
- Signed: Trinidad and Tobago Sign Language
- Keyboard layout: QWERTY

The languages of Trinidad and Tobago reflect its past of indigenous peoples, colonization, slavery, indentureship, and immigration. Trinidad and Tobago’s official language is English. Trinidadian Creole and Tobagonian Creole are the vernaculars spoken on each island, respectively. The creoles are English-based creoles that are influenced from the languages of the many ethnic groups in the country. The main heritage and minority languages spoken are Spanish, Trinidadian Hindustani, Trinidadian French-Creole (Patois), Chinese, Yoruba, Arabic, and Portuguese

== English and English creoles ==
English is the country's official language (the local variety of standard English is Trinidadian and Tobagonian English or more properly, Trinidad and Tobago Standard English, abbreviated as "TTSE"), but the main spoken language is either of two English-based creole languages (Trinidadian Creole or Tobagonian Creole), which reflects the Amerindian, European, African, and Asian heritage of the nation. Both creoles contain elements from a variety of African and South Asian languages; Trinidadian English Creole, however, is also influenced by French and Trinidadian French Creole (Patois).

== South Asian Languages ==
=== Hindustani ===
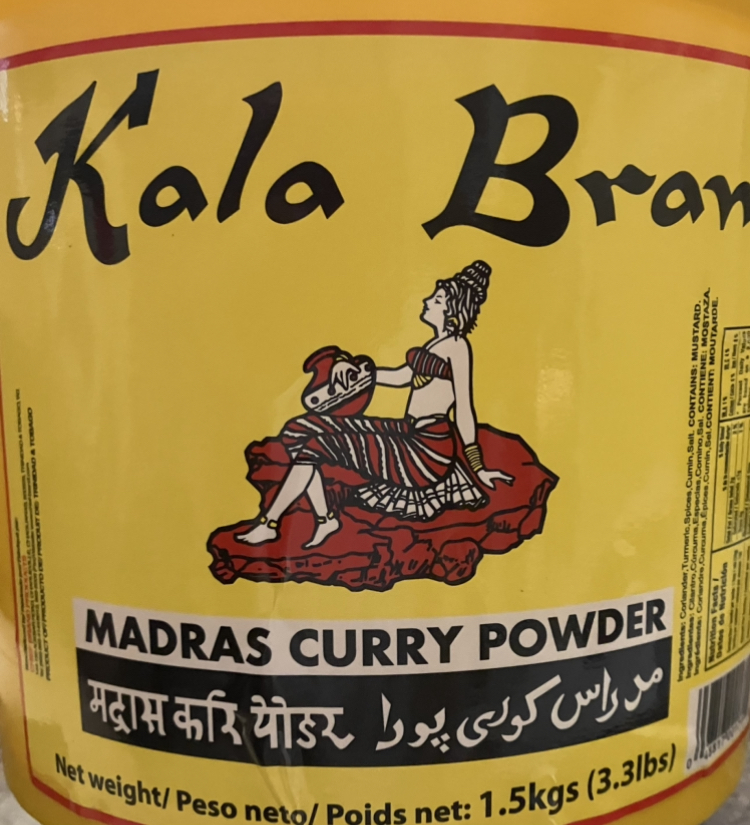
Trinidadian Hindustani text in the Devanagari and Perso-Arabic script on a bucket of curry powder from Trinidad and Tobago.

The variant that is spoken in Trinidad and Tobago is known as Trinidadian Hindustani, Trinidadian Bhojpuri, Trinidadian Hindi, Indian, Plantation Hindustani, or Gaon ke Bolee (Village Speech). A majority of the early Indian indentured immigrants spoke the Bhojpuri and Awadhi dialects, which later formed into Trinidadian Hindustani. In 1935, Indian movies began showing to audiences in Trinidad. Most of the Indian movies were in the Standard Hindustani (Hindi-Urdu) dialect and this modified Trinidadian Hindustani slightly by adding Standard Hindi and Urdu phrases and vocabulary to Trinidadian Hindustani. Indian movies also revitalized Hindustani among Indo-Trinidadian and Tobagonians. The British colonial government and estate owners had disdain and contempt for Hindustani and Indian languages in Trinidad. Due to this, many Indians saw it as a broken language keeping them in poverty and bound to the cane fields, and did not pass it on as a first language, but rather as a heritage language, as they favored English as a way out. Around the mid to late 1960s the lingua franca of Indo-Trinidadian and Tobagonians switched from Trinidadian Hindustani to a sort of Hindinized version of English. Today Hindustani survives on through Indo-Trinidadian and Tobagonian musical forms such as, Bhajan, Indian classical music, Indian folk music, Filmi, Pichakaree, Chutney, Chutney soca, and Chutney parang. As of 2003, there are about 15,633 Indo-Trinidadian and Tobagonians who speak Trinidadian Hindustani and as of 2011, there are about 10,000 who speak Standard Hindi. Many Indo-Trinidadians and Tobagonians today speak a type of Hinglish that consists of Trinidadian and Tobagonian English that is heavily laced with Trinidadian Hindustani vocabulary and phrases and many Indo-Trinidadians and Tobagonians can recite phrases or prayers in Hindustani today. There are many places in Trinidad and Tobago that have names of Hindustani origin. Some phrases and vocabulary have even made their way into the mainstream English and English Creole dialect of the country. World Hindi Day is celebrated each year on 10 January with events organized by the National Council of Indian Culture, Hindi Nidhi Foundation, Indian High Commission, Mahatma Gandhi Institute for Cultural Co-operation, and the Sanatan Dharma Maha Sabha.

=== Tamil, Telugu, and other Dravidian languages ===
The Tamil language is spoken by some of the older Tamil Indo-Trinidadian and Tobagonian population. It is mostly spoken by the few remaining children of indentured Indian laborers from the present-day state of Tamil Nadu in India. Few remaining children of the indentured labuorers also speak Telugu. Other speakers of the languages are recent immigrants from Tamil Nadu and Andhra Pradesh.

== French Creole (Patois) ==
Trinidadian French-Creole, also known as Patois or Patwa, is an Antillean French Creole of Trinidad taken to Trinidad by French Creole-speaking migrants from the islands such as Grenada, and the French Antilles, namely Guadeloupe and Martinique, and other French-colonised islands). All the creoles have slight differences in words, especially with regional dialects. Trinidad also has different ways to say or spell the same word in Creole.

== Spanish ==
In 2014, Spanish was the native language of 4,000 (0.3% of the total population) people in Trinidad and Tobago, being mostly made up of Venezuelan immigrants. Due to Trinidad and Tobago's proximity to Venezuela, current government regulations require that Spanish be taught in secondary education. Spanish is estimated to be spoken by around 5% of the population and has been promoted by recent governments as a "first foreign language" since March 2005 due to the country's proximity to Venezuela.

== Chinese ==
The Chinese language first came to Trinidad and Tobago in 1806, when the British had brought Chinese laborers in order to determine if they were fit to use as laborers after the abolition of slavery. About 2,645 Chinese immigrants arrived in Trinidad as indentured labour between 1853 and 1866. A majority of the people who immigrated in the 19th century were from southern China and spoke the Hakka and Yue dialects of Chinese. In the 20th century after the years of indentureship up to the present-day more Chinese people have immigrated to Trinidad and Tobago for business and they speak the dialects of the indenturees along with other Chinese dialects, such as Mandarin and Min.

== Indigenous languages ==
The indigenous languages were Yao on Trinidad and Karina on Tobago, both Cariban, and Shebaya on Trinidad, which was Arawakan. These languages have been extinct for over a century, but there are attempts to revive the Carib language by the Santa Rosa First Peoples Community.
