= Demographics of Trinidad and Tobago =

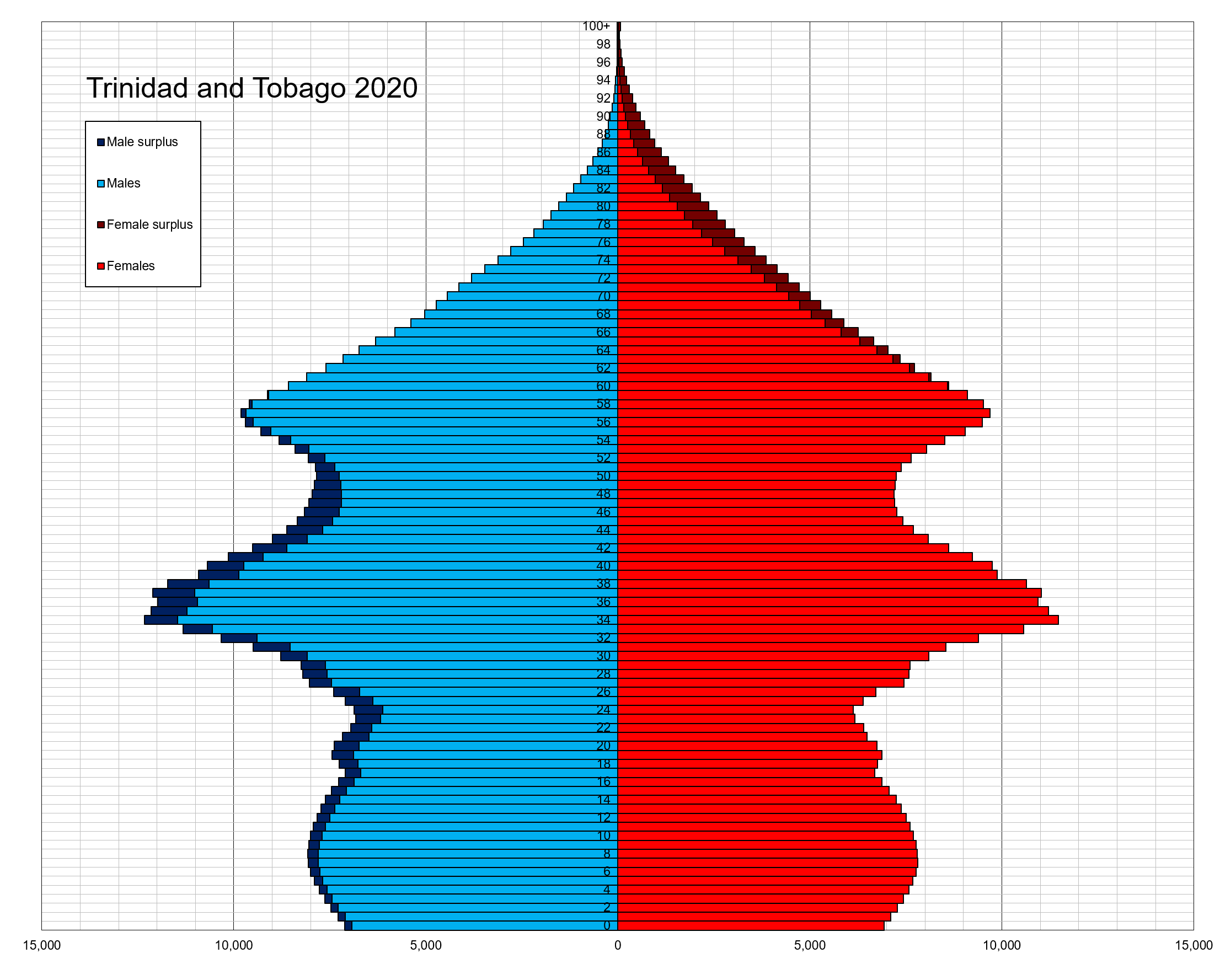
- Trinidad and Tobago population pyramid in 2020
- Population: 1,525,663
- Growth rate: 0.1% (2024 est.)
- Birth rate: 10.5 births/1,000 population (2024 est.)
- Death rate: 8.6 deaths/1,000 population (2024 est.)
- Life expectancy: 76.5 years (2024 est.)
  - male: 74.6 years (2024 est.)
  - female: 78.4 years (2024 est.)
- Fertility rate: 1.63 children born/woman (2024 est.)
- Infant mortality: 15.1 deaths/1,000 live births (2024 est.)
- Net migration rate: -0.9 migrant(s)/1,000 population (2024 est.)

Age structure
- 0–14 years: 18.7% (male 134,508/female 129,180) (2024 est.)
- 15–64 years: 67.2% (male 481,606/female 465,150) (2024 est.)
- 65 and over: 14.1% (male 92,146/female 106,376) (2024 est.)

Sex ratio
- Total: 1.01 male(s)/female (2024 est.)
- At birth: 1.04 male(s)/female (2024 est.)
- Under 15: 1.04 male(s)/female (2024 est.)
- 15–64 years: 1.04 male(s)/female (2024 est.)
- 65 and over: 0.87 male(s)/female (2024 est.)

Nationality
- Nationality: Trinidadian and Tobagonian

Language
- Official: English

This article is about the demography of the population of Trinidad and Tobago including population density, ethnicity, education level, health of the populace, economic status, religious affiliations and other aspects of the population.

Census population and growth rate
Year	Pop.	±% p.a.
1851	82,978	—
1861	99,848	+1.87%
1871	126,692	+2.41%
1881	171,179	+3.06%
1891	218,381	+2.47%
1901	273,899	+2.29%
1911	333,552	+1.99%
1921	365,913	+0.93%
1931	412,783	+1.21%
1946	563,222	+2.09%
1960	834,350	+2.85%
1970	945,210	+1.26%
1980	1,079,791	+1.34%
1990	1,213,733	+1.18%
2000	1,262,366	+0.39%
2011	1,328,019	+0.46%
2019	1,363,985	+0.33%

== Population ==
The total population of Trinidad and Tobago was 1,328,018 according to the 2011 census, an increase of 5.2% since the 2000 census. According to the 2022 revision of the World Population Prospects the total population was estimated at 1,525,663 in 2021, compared to only 646,000 in 1950. The proportion of children below the age of 15 in 2010 was 20.7%, 71% was between 15 and 65 years of age, while 8.3% was 65 years or older.

	Total population (x 1000)	Proportion aged 0–14 (%)	Proportion aged 15–64 (%)	Proportion aged 65+ (%)
1950	646	39.9	56.1	4.0
1955	740	42.2	54.2	3.7
1960	848	42.8	53.7	3.5
1965	912	43.4	53.2	3.4
1970	946	41.4	54.3	4.2
1975	1 011	37.6	57.5	4.8
1980	1 085	34.0	60.6	5.5
1985	1 171	34.3	60.2	5.6
1990	1 222	33.6	60.7	5.8
1995	1 255	30.8	63.2	6.1
2000	1 268	25.6	67.9	6.5
2005	1 297	21.8	70.9	7.2
2010	1 328	20.7	71.0	8.3

=== Structure of the population ===
Population by Sex and Age Group (Census 09.I.2011):

Age group	Male	Female	Total	%
Total	666 305	661 714	1 328 019	100
0–4	47 847	46 274	94 121	7.09
5–9	46 379	44 952	91 330	6.88
10–14	44 953	43 010	87 963	6.62
15–19	49 709	48 670	98 378	7.41
20–24	57 407	56 833	114 240	8.60
25–29	62 268	61 250	123 517	9.30
30–34	53 897	51 683	105 580	7.95
35–39	46 862	45 677	92 538	6.97
40–44	43 491	42 672	86 163	6.49
45–49	48 685	47 429	96 113	7.24
50–54	43 981	43 203	87 184	6.56
55–59	36 719	36 496	73 215	5.51
60–64	29 645	29 002	58 647	4.42
65–69	21 582	23 055	44 639	3.36
70–74	14 209	16 079	30 289	2.28
75–79	9 286	11 463	20 750	1.56
80+	9 384	13 966	23 351	1.76
Age group	Male	Female	Total	Percent
0–14	139 179	134 236	273 415	20.59
15–64	472 665	462 915	935 580	70.45
65+	54 461	64 563	119 024	8.96

Due to decreasing fertility, the proportion of children below the age of 15 is decreasing, while the proportion of elderly is increasing. The median age has increased from 21.6 in 1980, 24.1 in 1990, 28.1 in 2000 to 32.6 in 2011. The estimated mid-year population of 2014 is 1,344,000 (medium fertility scenario of The 2012 Revision of the World Population Prospects). As of January 2019, the estimated population is 1,383,368.

=== Emigration ===
Emigration from Trinidad and Tobago, as with other Caribbean nations, has historically been high; most emigrants go to the United States, Canada, and the United Kingdom. Emigration has continued, albeit at a lower rate, even as the birth-rate sharply dropped to levels typical of industrialised countries. Largely because of this phenomenon, as of 2011, Trinidad and Tobago has been experiencing a low population growth rate (0.48%). More recently, there has been some return migration, chiefly from the United States after the recession of 2008, which caused a population jump in the last census in 2011.

== Vital statistics ==
View source data.
View source data.
View source data.

=== Registered births and deaths ===
	Average population	Live births	Deaths	Natural change	Crude birth rate (per 1000)	Crude death rate (per 1000)	Natural change (per 1000)	TFR
1934	428,000	12,743	7,970	4,773	29.8	18.6	11.2	
1935	435,000	14,352	7,618	6,734	33.0	17.5	15.5	
1936	442,000	14,625	7,230	7,395	33.1	16.4	16.7	
1937	450,000	14,226	7,848	6,378	31.6	17.4	14.2	
1938	458,000	15,119	7,283	7,836	33.0	15.9	17.1	
1939	466,000	14,525	7,491	7,034	31.2	16.1	15.1	
1940	476,000	16,535	7,499	9,036	34.7	15.8	19.0	
1941	492,000	16,494	7,906	8,588	33.5	16.1	17.5	
1942	510,000	17,729	9,028	8,701	34.8	17.7	17.1	
1943	525,000	20,210	8,699	11,511	38.5	16.6	21.9	
1944	536,000	20,944	8,055	12,889	39.1	15.0	24.0	
1945	547,000	21,616	7,959	13,657	39.5	14.6	25.0	
1946	561,000	21,767	7,734	14,033	38.8	13.8	25.0	
1947	578,000	22,342	7,828	14,514	38.7	13.5	25.1	
1948	600,000	23,940	7,293	16,647	39.9	12.2	27.7	
1949	616,000	22,931	7,487	15,444	37.2	12.2	25.1	
1950	646,000	23,722	7,665	16,057	37.5	12.1	25.4	
1951	659,000	23,804	7,815	15,989	36.7	12.0	24.6	
1952	676,000	22,923	8,000	14,923	34.6	12.1	22.5	
1953	695,000	25,565	7,262	18,303	37.7	10.7	27.0	
1954	717,000	29,253	6,807	22,446	41.9	9.8	32.2	
1955	740,000	30,216	7,462	22,754	41.9	10.3	31.6	
1956	763,000	27,447	7,136	20,311	36.9	9.6	27.3	
1957	786,000	28,848	7,283	21,565	37.7	9.5	28.2	
1958	809,000	29,667	7,288	22,379	37.6	9.2	28.4	
1959	829,000	30,592	7,476	23,116	37.4	9.2	28.3	
1960	848,000	32,858	6,608	26,250	39.1	7.9	31.2	
1961	865,000	32,880	6,891	25,989	37.9	7.9	30.0	
1962	880,000	34,107	6,465	27,642	37.9	7.2	30.7	
1963	893,000	32,898	6,668	26,230	35.6	7.2	28.4	
1964	903,000	32,955	6,675	26,280	34.7	7.0	27.6	
1965	912,000	31,953	6,731	25,222	32.8	6.9	25.9	
1966	920,000	30,079	7,060	23,019	30.2	7.1	23.1	
1967	926,000	28,462	6,775	21,687	28.2	6.7	21.5	
1968	931,000	28,107	7,116	20,991	27.5	7.0	20.6	
1969	938,000	25,130	7,068	18,062	24.4	6.9	17.6	
1970	946,000	25,151	6,956	18,120	24.4	6.8	17.6	
1971	956,000	26,116	7,044	18,473	24.6	6.8	17.9	
1972	969,000	28,049	6,955	20,099	26.3	7.0	19.2	
1973	983,000	26,231	7,517	18,714	24.8	7.1	17.7	
1974	997,000	26,138	6,716	19,422	24.5	6.3	18.2	
1975	1,011,000	25,673	6,899	18,774	25.4	6.8	18.6	
1976	1,026,000	27,149	7,388	19,761	26.5	7.2	19.3	
1977	1,040,000	27,895	7,311	20,584	26.8	7.0	19.8	
1978	1,054,000	28,295	6,824	21,471	27.0	6.5	20.5	
1979	1,069,000	29,698	7,060	22,638	27.9	6.6	21.3	
1980	1,085,000	29,869	7,506	22,363	27.6	6.9	20.7	
1981	1,103,000	32,177	7,355	24,822	29.4	6.7	22.7	
1982	1,121,000	32,537	7,641	24,896	29.2	6.8	22.3	
1983	1,139,000	33,208	7,546	25,662	29.2	6.6	22.5	
1984	1,156,000	31,599	7,819	23,780	27.0	6.7	20.3	
1985	1,171,000	33,719	8,026	25,693	28.8	6.9	21.9	
1986	1,184,000	31,886	7,699	24,187	26.9	6.5	20.4	
1987	1,195,000	29,167	8,054	21,113	24.4	6.7	17.7	
1988	1,205,000	26,983	8,036	18,947	22.4	6.7	15.7	
1989	1,214,000	25,072	8,213	16,859	20.7	6.8	13.9	
1990	1,222,000	23,960	8,196	15,764	19.6	6.7	12.9	2.45
1991	1,230,000	22,368	8,192	14,176	18.2	6.7	11.5	2.34
1992	1,237,000	23,064	8,533	14,531	18.6	6.9	11.7	2.23
1993	1,244,000	21,094	8,807	12,287	17.0	7.1	9.9	2.13
1994	1,250,000	19,682	9,265	10,417	15.7	7.4	8.3	2.04
1995	1,255,000	19,258	9,042	10,216	15.3	7.2	8.1	1.96
1996	1,258,000	17,992	9,376	8,616	14.3	7.5	6.8	1.90
1997	1,261,000	18,452	9,157	9,295	14.6	7.3	7.4	1.84
1998	1,263,000	17,898	9,365	8,533	14.2	7.4	6.8	1.80
1999	1,265,000	18,321	10,014	8,307	14.5	7.9	6.6	1.77
2000	1,268,000	18,160	9,478	8,682	14.3	7.5	6.8	1.75
2001	1,272,000	18,078	9,753	8,325	14.2	7.7	6.5	1.74
2002	1,278,000	16,990	9,797	7,193	13.3	7.7	5.6	1.74
2003	1,284,000	17,989	10,206	7,783	14.0	7.9	6.1	1.75
2004	1,290,000	17,235	9,872	7,363	13.4	7.7	5.7	1.76
2005	1,294,494	17,264	9,885	7,379	13.3	7.6	5.7	1.77
2006	1,297,944	18,090	9,668	8,422	13.9	7.5	6.4	1.78
2007	1,303,188	18,889	9,654	9,235	14.5	7.4	7.1	1.79
2008	1,308,587	19,888	10,463	9,425	15.2	8.0	7.2	1.80
2009	1,310,106	17,499	9,693	7,806	13.4	7.4	6.0	1.80
2010	1,317,714	19,092	10,477	8,615	14.5	8.0	6.5	1.81
2011	1,328,019	18,141	10,007	8,134	13.7	7.5	6.2	1.80
2012	1,335,194	19,801	9,627	10,174	14.8	7.2	7.6	1.738
2013	1,340,557	18,741	10,376	8,365	14.0	7.7	6.3	1.741
2014	1,345,343	18,431	10,642	7,789	13.7	7.9	5.8	1.751
2015	1,349,667	18,896	11,580	7,316	14.0	8.6	5.4	1.678
2016	1,353,895	18,373	11,145	7,228	13.6	8.2	5.4	1.666
2017	1,356,633	17,393	11,655	5,738	12.8	8.6	4.2	1.506
2018	1,359,193	17,218	11,658	5,560	12.7	8.6	4.1	1.493
2019	1,363,985	16,058	11,266	4,792	11.8	8.3	3.5	
2020	1,366,725	~15,731	~12,984	~2,747	11.5	9.5	2.0	
2021	1,367,558	~14,223	~13,388	~883	10.4	9.8	0.6	
2022	1,365,805	~14,000	~18,356	~–4,357	10.3	13.4	–3.2	
2023	1,367,510	~13,073	~13,976	~–889	9.6	10.2	–0.7	
2024	1,368,333	~12,041	~13,820	~–1,779	8.8	10.1	–1.3	
2025	1,367,764				8.0	10.3	–2.3	

=== Life expectancy at birth ===
Period	Life expectancy in Years	Period	Life expectancy in Years
1950–1955	57.9	1985–1990	68.2
1955–1960	60.8	1990–1995	68.4
1960–1965	64.1	1995–2000	68.7
1965–1970	64.8	2000–2005	69.3
1970–1975	65.5	2005–2010	70.2
1975–1980	66.7	2010–2015	70.8
1980–1985	67.3		

Source: UN World Population Prospects

== Ethnic groups ==
Population of Trinidad and Tobago according to ethnic group
Ethnic group	Census 1946		Census 1960		Census 1970		Census 1980		Census 1990		Census 2000		Census 2011	
Ethnic group	Number	%	Number	%	Number	%	Number	%	Number	%	Number	%	Number	%
Indian	195,747	35.1	301,946	36.5	373,538	40.1	426,660	40.3	453,069	40.3	446,273	40.0	468,524	35.43
African	261,485	46.9	358,588	43.3	398,765	42.8	434,730	41.1	445,444	39.6	418,268	37.5	452,536	34.22
Mixed	78,775	14.1	134,749	16.3	133,706	14.4	175,150	16.5	207,558	18.4	228,089	20.5	301,866	22.82
European including Portuguese	15,283	2.7	20,202	2.4	11,383	1.2	9,850	0.9	7,254	0.6	7,034	0.6	8,669	0.65
Chinese	5,641	1.0	8,361	1.0	7,962	0.9	5,670	0.5	4,314	0.4	3,800	0.3	4,003	0.30
Amerindian													1,394	0.11
Syrian, Lebanese or Arab	889	0.2	1,590	0.2			1,010	0.1	934	0.1	849	0.1	1,029	0.08
Other			6,714	0.8	4,332	0.5	2,900	0.3	1,724	0.2	1,972	0.2	2,280	0.17
Unknown or undeclared	150	0.0	291	0.0	1,385		2,350	0.2	4,831	0.4	8,487	0.8	82,246	6.22
Total	557,970		827,957				1,058,320		1,125,128		1,114,772		1,322,546	

Ethnic groups of Trinidad and Tobago
Ethnic groups	percent
Indian	35.4%
African	34.2%
Mixed	15.3%
Dougla (Mixed African/Indian)	7.7%
Unspecified	6.2%
Other	1.3%

=== Indo-Trinidadian and Tobagonians ===
Indo-Trinidadians make up the country's largest ethnic group (approximately 35.43%). Indo-Trinidadians are primarily the descendants of indentured workers from British India.

=== Afro-Trinidadian and Tobagonians ===
Afro-Trinidadian and Tobagonian make up the country's second largest ethnic group (approximately 34.22%). Although enslaved Africans were first imported in 1517, they constituted only 11 percent of the population (310) in 1783. Many Afro-Trinbagonians have ancestors hailing from West and West-central Africa, akin to numerous other Caribbean islands and in some cases a result of later migration between the islands. This would have been from many kingdoms, states, and peoples from a range of modern-day Senegal in the north to Angola in the south. The majority of the enslaved Africans were brought in the last few years of Trinidad's Spanish colonial era, and the beginning of the British colonial period. The Cedula of Population transformed a small colony of 1,000 in 1773 to 18,627 by 1797. In the census of 1777 there were only 2,763 people recorded as living on the island, including some 2,000 Arawaks. In 1807, the UK Parliament passed the Slave Trade Act 1807 that abolished the trading of enslaved persons, and the Slavery Abolition Act 1833 abolished the practice of slavery itself. Numerous staples of Trinbagonian culture have Afro-Trinbagonian roots, such as Calypso, Carnival, and traditional dishes such as callaloo.

=== European Trinidadian and Tobagonians ===
The European Trinidadian (or White Trinidadian) population is primarily descended from early settlers and immigrants. The recent census counted 8,669 people of European descent including those of Portuguese descent. These numbers do not include people who have at least some European ancestry or self-identify as African or Indian.

The French arrived mostly during the Spanish period to take advantage of free agricultural lands. Some Portuguese arrived in the mid-nineteenth century and more came at the turn of the century. The Europeans who remained in Trinidad live in areas in and around Port of Spain. Furthermore, British rule led to an influx of settlers from the United Kingdom and the British colonies of the Eastern Caribbean and descendants of English indentured workers brought in as overseers following the end of the Second World War.

The Portuguese came to Tobago and Trinidad as early as the 17th century, including groups of Jews, Catholics and Protestants. For over 140 years, from 1834 up to 1975, the ancestors of the modern Portuguese community in Trinidad and Tobago hailed mostly from the archipelago of Madeira, starting from 1846, with the earliest registers being from the Azores in 1834.

Most Portuguese came directly from Madeira, and also via Guyana, St Vincent, Antigua and St Kitts.

Important communities settled in Port of Spain, Arima, Arouca, Chaguanas, San Fernando and Scarborough.

In 2011, the Madeiran Portuguese Community of Trinidad and Tobago celebrated their 165th Anniversary of arrival of the first Madeirans in Trinidad back in 1846.

Recalling the presence of the Portuguese in the nation today are over 100 Portuguese surnames, some of which have become street nomenclature. As an independent nation, the country has recognised several members of the Portuguese community through official awards.

In Tobago, many white residents are retirees who have recently arrived there.

=== Mixed ethnicity ===
Given the large number of ethnic identities in Trinidad and Tobago, many citizens have a mixed ethnic heritage due to influences from European, West African, Indian or Han Chinese ancestry. Common ethnic mixtures include people of African and European descent (Mulatto-Creoles) 15-20% and African and Indian descent (often colloquially known as Dougla) 7-10%. This mixed population is estimated at 30%.

==== Notable Mixed Trinidadians and Tobagonians Include ====
- Eric Willams
- Anthony Carmona
- George Maxwell Richards
- Nicki Minaj
- Giselle Laronde
- Kees Dieffenthaller
- Mervyn Dymally
- Andre Rampersad
- Gema Ramkeesoon

=== Chinese-Trinidadians and Tobagonians ===
There are groups of Chinese who, like the Indians, are descended from indentured labourers. They account for about 4,000 people and live mostly in Port-of-Spain and San Fernando.

In Trinidad there were, about twenty years ago [i.e. about 1886], 4,000 or 5,000 Chinese, but they have decreased to probably about 2,000 or 3,000, [2,200 in 1900]. They used to work in sugar plantations, but are now principally shopkeepers, as well as general merchants, miners and railway builders, etc.

=== Arab-Trinidadians and Tobagonians ===
There are also more than 1,000 Arabs, originating from Syria and Lebanon who live mostly in Port-of-Spain. The Syrian and Lebanese communities of Trinidad are predominantly Christian, migrating from the Middle East in the 19th century from the Ottoman Empire later landing in the Caribbean and Latin America. Other Lebanese and Syrians came in the early to middle 20th century to escape the war and turmoil in the region.

=== Indigenous (Caribs) ===
Finally, there are the mixed raced Caribs who are descended from the native, precolonial people of the islands. They are organized around the Santa Rosa Carib Community and live mostly in and around Arima.

== Religion ==
Religions of Trinidad and Tobago
Religion	percent
Roman Catholic	21.6%
Hindu	18.2%
Pentecostal/Evangelical/Full Gospel	12%
Unspecified	11.1%
Other	8.4%
Baptist	6.9%
Anglican	5.7%
Islam	5%
Seventh-Day Adventist	4.1%
None	2.2%
Presbyterian/Congregational	2.5%
Jehovah's Witness	1.5%

In 2011, according to census data, Roman Catholicism was again the largest religious denomination with 285,671 followers (21.6% of the total population), having declined from a membership of 289,711 in 2000 (26% of the population). Other religious denominations that experienced decreases in their membership in 2011 were Hinduism (from 22.5% in 2000 to 18.2% in 2011), Anglican (from 7.8% to 5.7%), Presbyterian/Congregational (from 3.3% to 2.5%) and Methodist (from 0.9% to 0.7%). The number of persons claiming affiliation to Pentecostal/Evangelical/Full Gospel more than doubled from 76,327 in 2000 (6.8%) to 159,033 in 2011 (12.0%). The number of Muslims slightly increased but as proportion of the total population there was a decrease from 5.8% in 2000 to 5.0% in 2011. The category ‘None’ witnessed a small increase from 1.9% to 2.2%, while those who did not state a religion increased significantly, from 1.4% to 11.1%. Approximately 1.2% of the population are adherents of the Baháʼí Faith. The African religions and specifically Orisha have become institutions in Trinidad and Tobago's society. They serve not only the obvious religious needs but also as a source of inspiration for personal identity. Many people, motivated by the need to re-claim their African heritage can now openly support these religions because they see in them a source of understanding and a coming to terms with their enslavement and the colonial past.

== Language ==
Languages of Trinidad and Tobago
- Official: English
- Indigenous: Carib, Yaio, Shebaya, Warao (all extinct)
- Vernacular: Trinidadian Creole and Tobagonian Creole
- Minority: Spanish, Trinidadian Hindustani, Antillean French Creole (Patois), Chinese, Arabic

=== English and creoles ===
English is the country's official language (the local variety of standard English is Trinidadian and Tobagonian English or more properly, Trinidad and Tobago Standard English, abbreviated as "TTSE"), but the main spoken language is either of two English-based creole languages (Trinidadian Creole or Tobagonian Creole), which reflects the Amerindian, European, African, and Asian heritage of the nation. Both creoles contain elements from a variety of African and South Asian languages; Trinidadian English Creole, however, is also influenced by French and French Creole (Patois).

=== Hindustani ===
The variant that is spoken in Trinidad and Tobago is known as Trinidadian Hindustani, Trinidadian Bhojpuri, Trinidadian Hindi, Indian, Plantation Hindustani, or Gaon ke Bolee (Village Speech). A majority of the early Indian indentured immigrants spoke the Bhojpuri and Awadhi dialects, which later formed into Trinidadian Hindustani. In 1935, Indian movies began showing to audiences in Trinidad. Most of the Indian movies were in the Standard Hindustani (Hindi-Urdu) dialect and this modified Trinidadian Hindustani slightly by adding Standard Hindi and Urdu phrases and vocabulary to Trinidadian Hindustani. Indian movies also revitalized Hindustani among Indo-Trinidadian and Tobagonians. The British colonial government and estate owners had disdain and contempt for Hindustani and Indian languages in Trinidad. Due to this, many Indians saw it as a broken language keeping them in poverty and bound to the cane fields, and did not pass it on as a first language, but rather as a heritage language, as they favored English as a way out. Around the mid to late 1960s the lingua franca of Indo-Trinidadian and Tobagonians switched from Trinidadian Hindustani to a sort of Hindinized version of English. Today Hindustani survives on through Indo-Trinidadian and Tobagonian musical forms such as, Bhajan, Indian classical music, Indian folk music, Filmi, Pichakaree, Chutney, Chutney soca, and Chutney parang. As of 2003, there are about 15,633 Indo-Trinidadian and Tobagonians who speak Trinidadian Hindustani and as of 2011, there are about 10,000 who speak Standard Hindi. Many Indo-Trinidadians and Tobagonians today speak a type of Hinglish that consists of Trinidadian and Tobagonian English that is heavily laced with Trinidadian Hindustani vocabulary and phrases and many Indo-Trinidadians and Tobagonians can recite phrases or prayers in Hindustani today. There are many places in Trinidad and Tobago that have names of Hindustani origin. Some phrases and vocabulary have even made their way into the mainstream English and English Creole dialect of the country. World Hindi Day is celebrated each year on 10 January with events organized by the National Council of Indian Culture, Hindi Nidhi Foundation, Indian High Commission, Mahatma Gandhi Institute for Cultural Co-operation, and the Sanatan Dharma Maha Sabha.

=== Spanish ===
In 2014, Spanish was the native language of 4,000 (0.3% of the total population) people in Trinidad and Tobago, being mostly made up of Venezuelan immigrants. Due to Trinidad and Tobago's proximity to Venezuela, current government regulations require that Spanish be taught in secondary education. Spanish is estimated to be spoken by around 5% of the population and has been promoted by recent governments as a "first foreign language" since March 2005 due to the country's proximity to Venezuela.

=== Tamil ===
The Tamil language is spoken by some of the older Tamil Indo-Trinidadian and Tobagonian population. It is mostly spoken by the few remaining children of indentured Indian laborers from the present-day state of Tamil Nadu in India. Other speakers of the language are recent immigrants from Tamil Nadu.

=== Chinese ===
The Chinese language first came to Trinidad and Tobago in 1806, when the British had brought Chinese laborers in order to determine if they were fit to use as laborers after the abolition of slavery. About 2,645 Chinese immigrants arrived in Trinidad as indentured labour between 1853 and 1866. A majority of the people who immigrated in the 19th century were from southern China and spoke the Hakka and Yue dialects of Chinese. In the 20th century after the years of indentureship up to the present-day more Chinese people have immigrated to Trinidad and Tobago for business and they speak the dialects of the indenturees along with other Chinese dialects, such as Mandarin and Min.

=== Indigenous languages ===
The indigenous languages were Yao on Trinidad and Karina on Tobago, both Cariban, and Shebaya on Trinidad, which was Arawakan. These languages have been extinct for over a century, but there are attempts to revive the Carib language by the Santa Rosa First Peoples Community.
