= Afro–Trinidadians and Tobagonians =

Trinidadians and Tobagonians of African descent

Afro-Trinidadians and Tobagonians
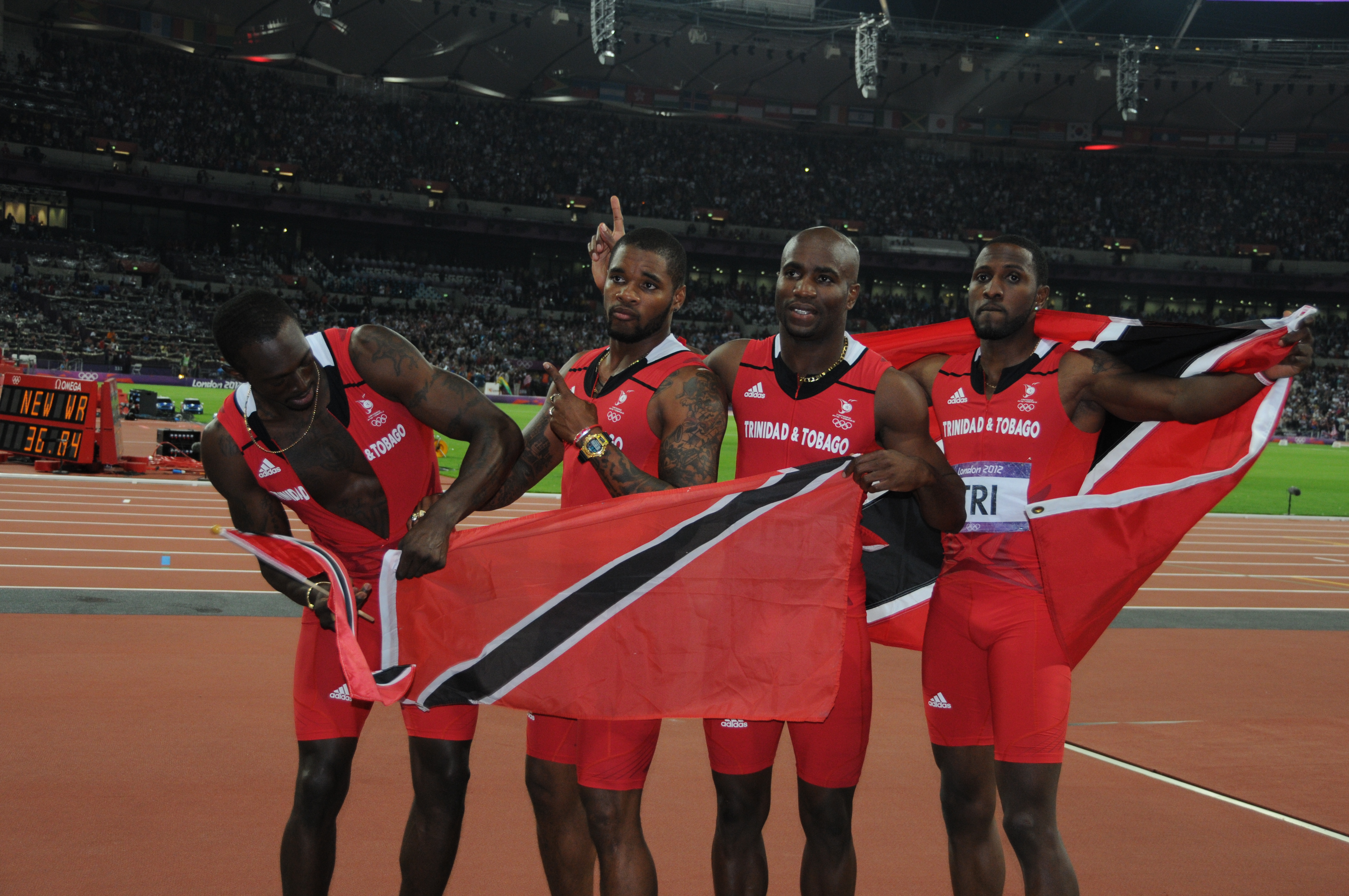
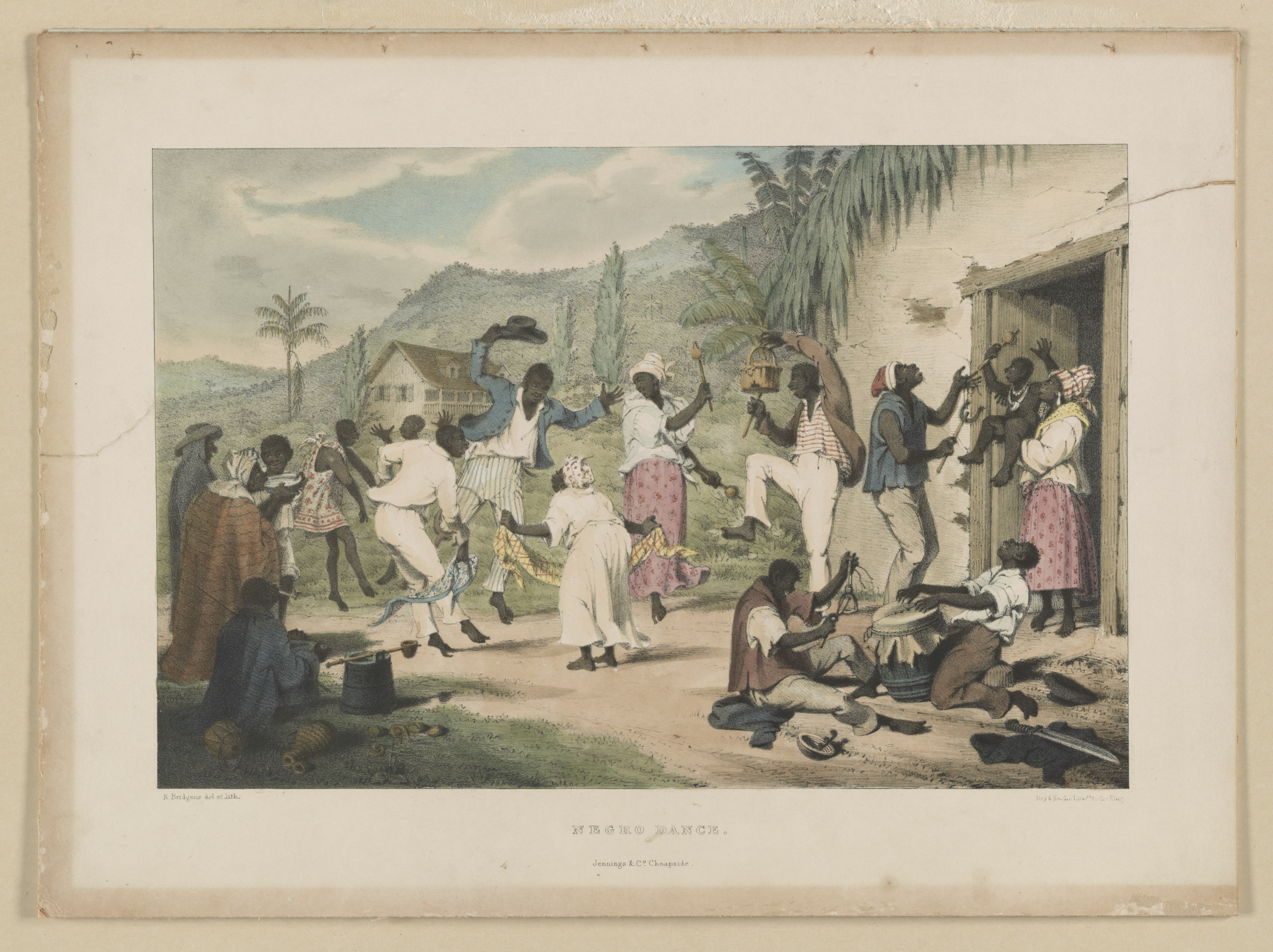
- Afro-Trinidadians and Tobagonians competing at the 2012 London Olympics (left). Lithograph of Afro-Trinidadians and Tobagonians dancing in colonial times (right).

Regions with significant populations
- Concentrated in Tobago and the North, West, and Southwest of Trinidad with pockets in the northeast and East–West Corridor of Trinidad; Trinidad and Tobago 452,536

Languages
- Trinidadian and Tobagonian English • Trinidadian English Creole • Tobagonian English Creole • Trinidadian French Creole (Patois)

Religion
- Majority: Christianity; Minority: Spiritual Baptist • Rastafari • Islam • Orisha-Shango • Vodunu-Rada • other African diaspora religions

Related ethnic groups
- Afro-Caribbeans • Afro-Caribbean Americans • British Afro-Caribbean people • Afro-Grenadians • Afro-Guyanese • Afro-Haitians • Afro-Jamaicans • Afro-Venezuelans • African People • African diaspora • Akans • Igbo • Mandinkas • Yoruba • Merikins • African Americans • Afro–Latin Americans • Douglas • Mulatto-Creole • Cocoa panyols

Afro–Trinidadians and Tobagonians, also known as Afro-Trinbagonians or Black Trinidadians and Tobagonians, are people from Trinidad and Tobago whose ancestors are of sub-Saharan African origin, primarily from West and Central Africa, brought to the islands during the period of British colonial rule via transatlantic slave trade beginning in the 17th century.

According to the 2011 Trinidad and Tobago Census, Afro–Trinidadians and Tobagonians made up 34.2% of the population, the second largest ethnic group, with 22.8% identifying as Multiracial, including 8-10% of the ethnic group identifying specifically as Dougla, a mix of African and Indian descent.

During the colonial era, terms such as Mulatto, Creole, Dougla, Zambo, Maroon, Pardo, Quadroon, Octoroon, and Hexadecaroon (Quintroon) were used to classify people based on proportions of African ancestry. These classifications were common across the Caribbean, Latin America, and North American regions.

== Origins ==
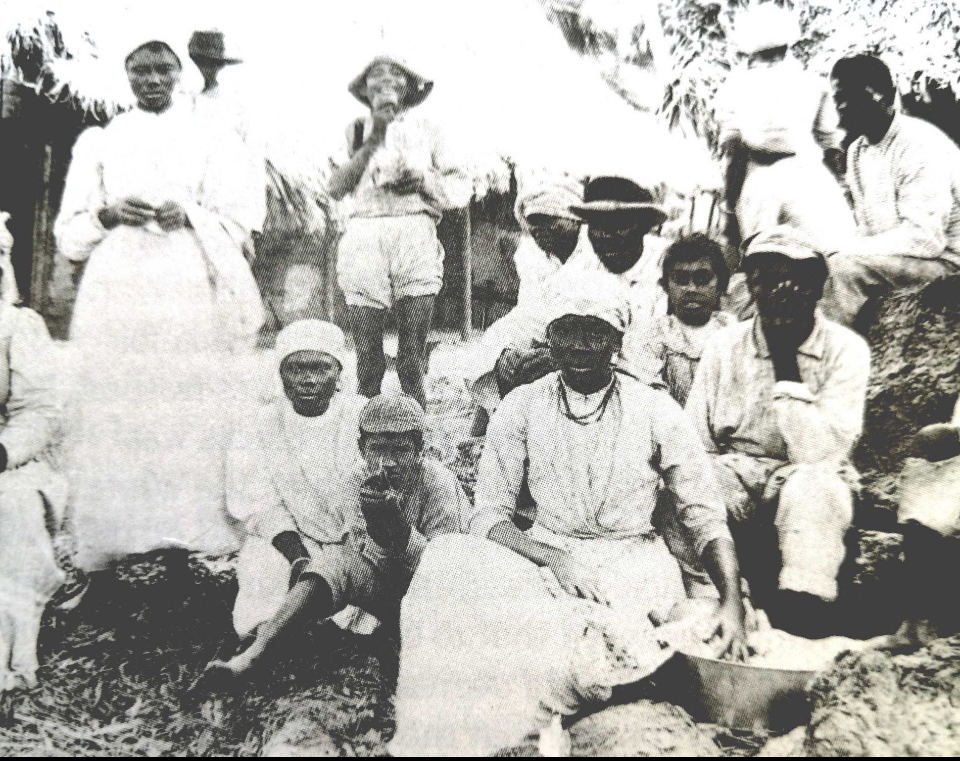
Afro-Trinidadians during the post-emancipation period.

The ultimate origin of most African ancestry in Trinidad and Tobago is in West and Central Africa. The most common ethnic groups of the enslaved West and Central Africans in Trinidad and Tobago were Igbo, Kongo, Ibibio, Yoruba and Malinke people. All of these groups, among others, were heavily affected by the Atlantic slave trade. The population census of 1813 shows that among African-born slaves the Igbo were the most numerous.

African ethnicities over 500 in Trinidad (1813)
Igbo	2,863
Kongo	2,450
Ibibio	2,240
Malinke	1,421
Total Africans	13,984
Origins of Creoles over 400 in Trinidad (1813)
Trinidad	7,088
Martinique	962
Grenada	746
Saint Vincent	438
Guadeloupe	428
Total Creoles	11,633

Around half of Afro-Trinidadians were the descendants of migrants from other Caribbean islands, especially Martinique, Guadeloupe, Saint Vincent, and Grenada. The other half of Afro-Trinidadians traced their ancestry to the escaped enslaved Africans from America who were recruited by the British during the War of 1812 commonly known as “Merikins” to fight the Americans in exchange for freedom and migration to Trinidad and Tobago. As well as enslaved Africans and indentured laborers bought directly from West Africa.

== Culture ==
=== Music ===
Afro-Trinidadians have played a foundational role in the development of Trinidad and Tobago’s musical identity. Genres such as calypso music, soca music, and the invention of the steelpan originated largely within Afro-Trinidadian communities, reflecting a fusion of African rhythms, oral storytelling, and Caribbean innovation.

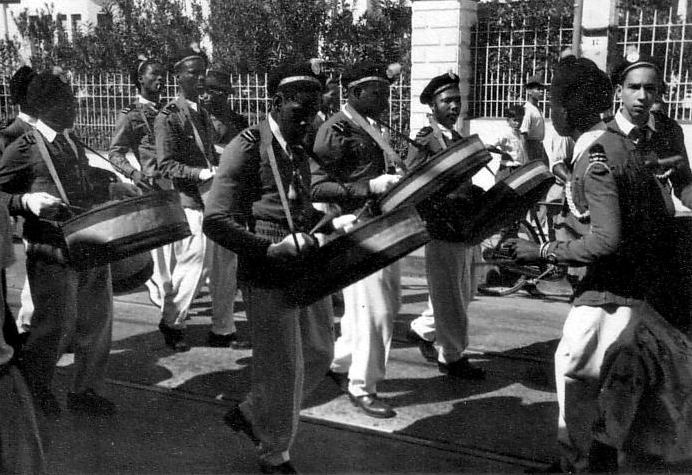
Afro-Trinidadian steelpan and calypso players.

Soca music and many other Trinidadian genres like rapso, ragga soca, bouyon soca, and parang soca all trace their roots to Afro-Trinidadian culture and the foundation laid by calypso (Afro-Trinidadian-made genre of music). Born from West African rhythms and oral traditions, calypso served as a tool of resistance, expression, and storytelling during and after slavery. As it evolved, Afro-Trinidadians pioneered new sounds—fusing calypso with funk, reggae, and Afro beats—giving rise to modern forms like soca and its many offshoots. These genres continue to reflect Afro-Trinidadian identity and remain central to Trinidadian Carnival, social commentary, and cultural pride.

=== Sports ===
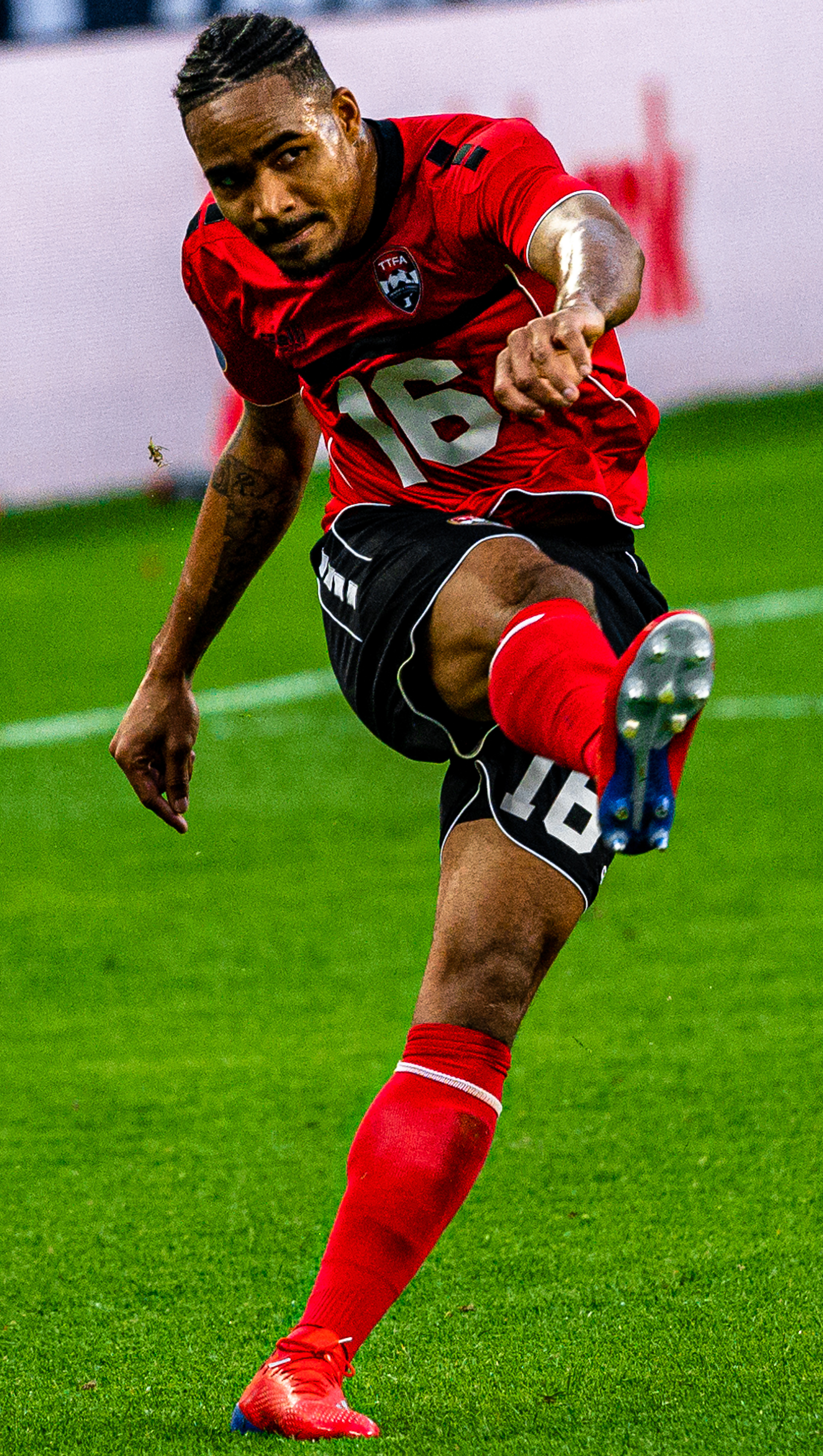
Alvin Jones representing Trinidad and Tobago in international football.

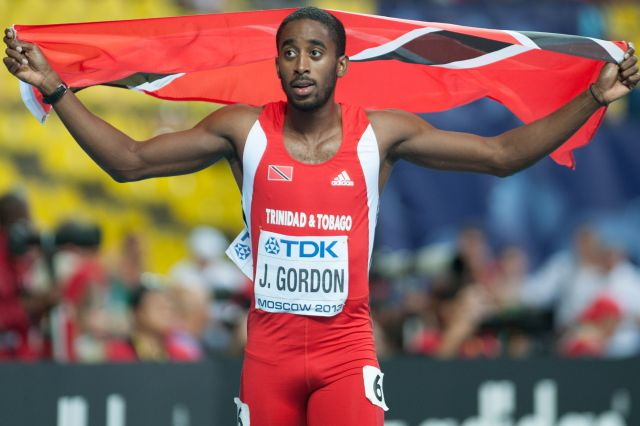
Jehue Gordon after winning gold at the 2013 World Championships.

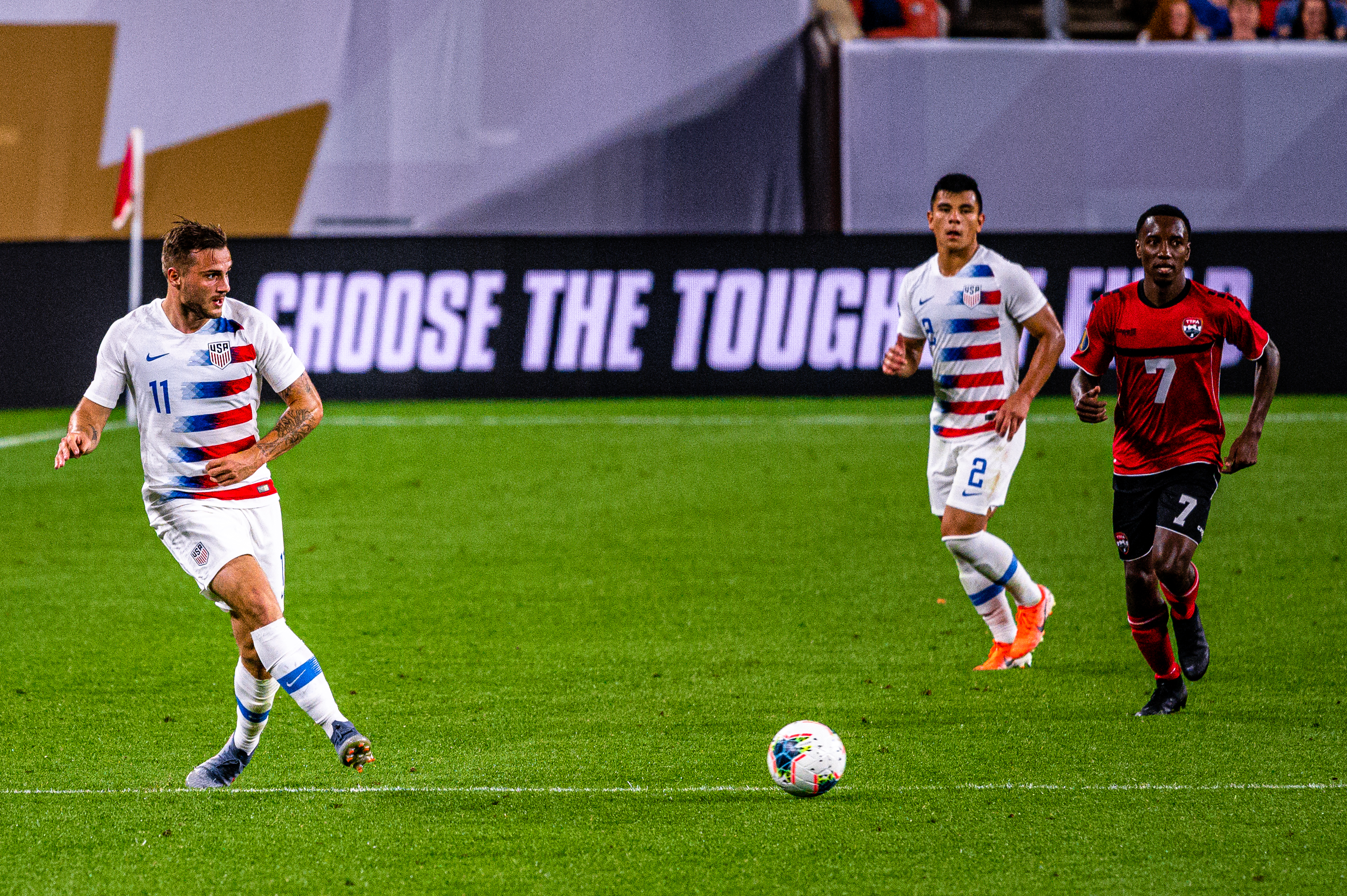
Levi García during a 2019 Gold Cup match.

Football (soccer) and Track and Field are deeply rooted in Afro-Trinidadian culture, especially in urban areas like Laventille, Morvant, and San Fernando. Both serve as powerful sources of pride, identity, and community unity. In Tobago, these sports are also widely embraced, playing a key role in youth development and island life. Afro-Trinidadian athletes have brought international recognition to Trinidad and Tobago—most notably when the national football team qualified for the 2006 FIFA World Cup, and through Olympic achievements in track and field, with medalists like Ato Boldon and Keshorn Walcott. In addition, goat racing—especially popular in Buccoo, Tobago—is a unique sport with deep Afro-Trinidadian roots, celebrated as both a cultural tradition and competitive event.

=== Cuisine ===
Afro-Trinidadian cuisine reflects a rich heritage rooted in African culinary traditions, adapted to local ingredients and cultural influences. Signature dishes include Callaloo, a stew made with dasheen leaves, okra, and often crab or pigtail, simmered in coconut milk and spices. Another staple is pelau, a one-pot dish combining rice, pigeon peas, and meat, caramelized with brown sugar for depth of flavor. Macaroni pie, a baked macaroni and cheese casserole, is also a beloved side dish. These meals are central to Afro-Trinidadian identity, especially during family gatherings, Sunday lunches, and cultural celebrations.

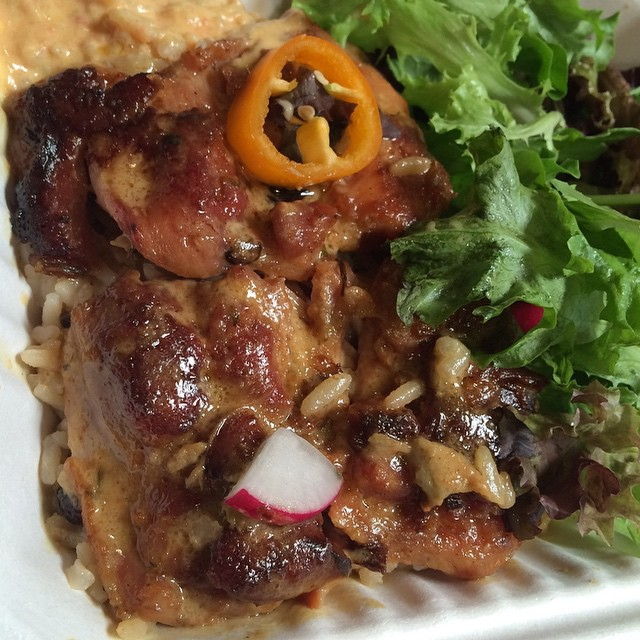
A traditional plate of chicken pelau, a signature Afro-Trinidadian dish.

Staples such as pelau, callaloo, oil down, stew chicken, and provision with saltfish trace back to African cooking methods brought by enslaved Africans. Over time, Afro-Trinidadians adapted these recipes using local foods, developing signature dishes like macaroni pie and bakes with fried fish. These meals remain central to Afro-Trinidadian identity, especially during family gatherings, Sunday lunches, and cultural celebrations.

== Politics ==
Afro-Trinidadian and Tobagonian Political Leaders

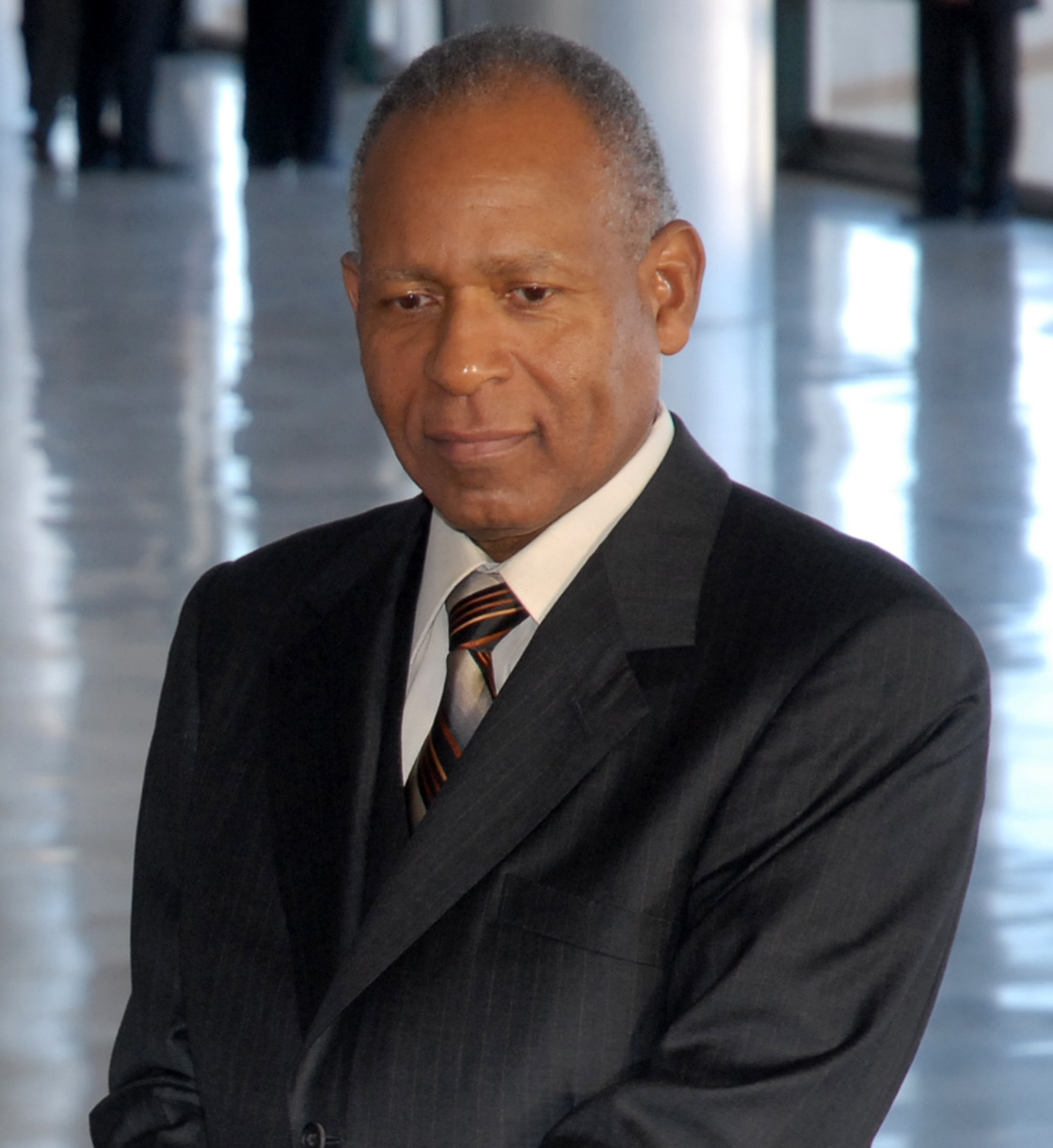
Patrick Manning

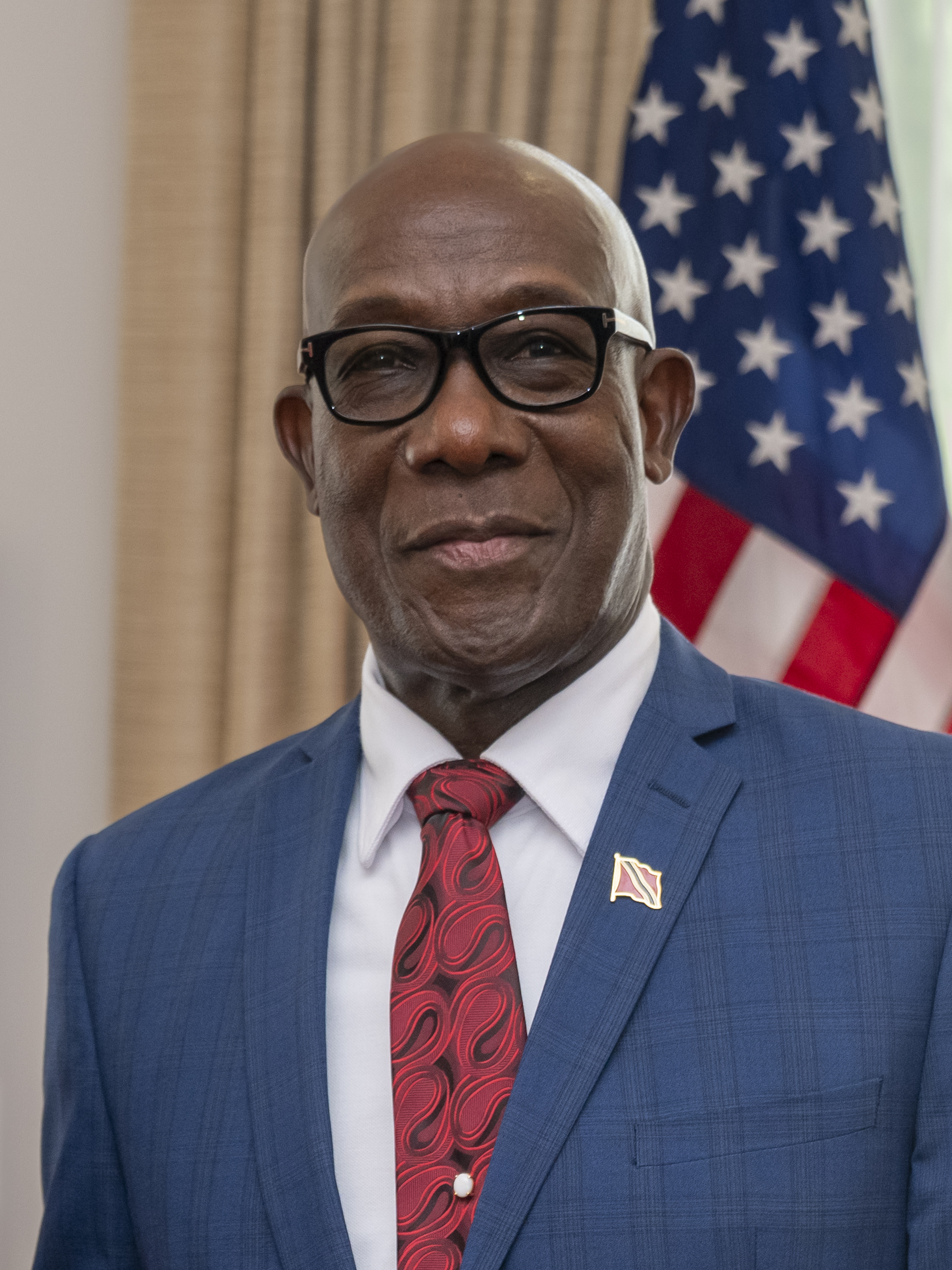
Keith Rowley

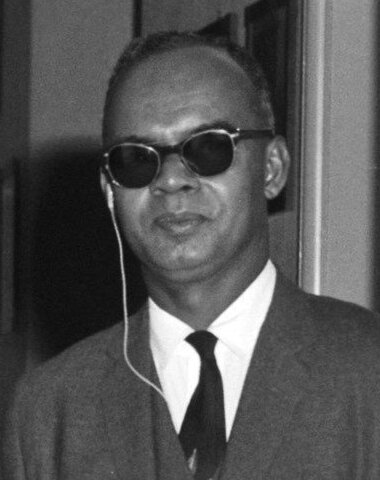
Eric Williams

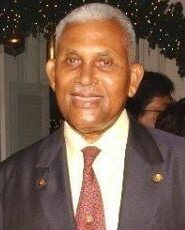
A. N. R. Robinson

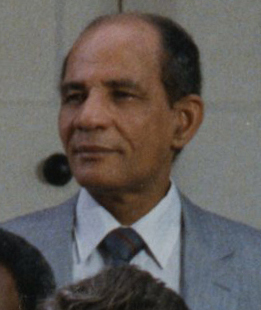
George Chambers

Afro-Trinidadians have played a pivotal role in shaping the political landscape of Trinidad and Tobago. The People's National Movement (PNM), was founded in 1956 by Eric Williams, the nation's first Prime Minister, the PNM has been historically supported by the Christian Afro-Trinidadian community. In politics, the United National Congress (UNC), the predominantly Hindu and Presbyterian Indo-Trinidadian-led party, has been the biggest opposition party to the PNM since 1991. The Spiritual Baptist Afro-Trinidadian and Tobagonians have supported the UNC due to them legalizing their practices and giving them a public holiday.

Williams' leadership was instrumental in steering the country towards independence in 1962.

A significant moment in Afro-Trinidadian political activism was the Black Power Revolution of 1970. Led by figures such as Makandal Daaga, this movement sought to address racial inequalities and promote Black consciousness, drawing inspiration from global Black Power movements. The revolution led to widespread demonstrations and brought about social and political reforms.

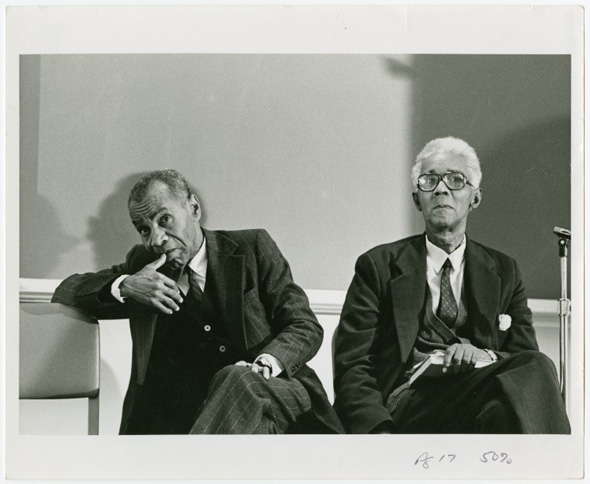
Afro-Trinidadian intellectual C. L. R. James (left) with French Guianese poet Léon Damas at the 2nd Congress of Afrikan People in San Diego, 1972—a gathering of global Black thinkers, writers and activists.

Other notable Afro-Trinidadian political figures include Isabel Ursula Teshea, the first woman to serve in the House of Representatives and as a cabinet minister, and Camille Robinson-Regis, a long-serving member of parliament and minister in various portfolios. Their contributions have been vital in advancing social justice and political representation for Afro-Trinidadians.

Afro-Trinidadians have been central to the political leadership of Trinidad and Tobago since independence. They’ve dominated national politics through key parties like the People’s National Movement (PNM), founded by Dr. Eric Williams, the country's first Prime Minister and "Father of the Nation". Other notable Afro-Trinidadian leaders include A. N. R. Robinson, who served as both Prime Minister and President, and Patrick Manning, known for his contributions to economic development. Dr. Keith Rowley, who served as Prime Minister from 2015 to 2025, continued this legacy, focusing on economic diversification and regional leadership. Their leadership has helped shape the country’s institutions, policies, and national identity.

== Emergence of Afro-Trinidadian and Tobagonians ==
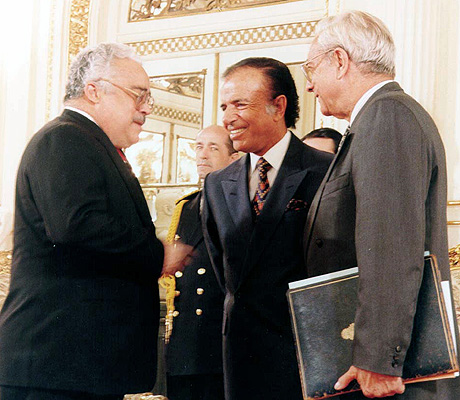
Afro-Trinidadian Ambassador Robert Torry of Trinidad and Tobago presenting credentials in Argentina.

Between 1968 and 1970, the Black Power Revolution gained significant momentum in Trinidad and Tobago. The National Joint Action Committee (NJAC) was formed by a group of undergraduate students at the St. Augustine Campus of the University of the West Indies. The movement was influenced by international figures and movements, including Fidel Castro, Stokely Carmichael, and Malcolm X, as well as the Black Power movement and Civil Rights Movement in the United States. The National Joint Action Committee demonstrated to bring about Black Power and a return to African heritage and African culture.

On 6 April 1970, protester Basil Davis—a 24-year-old supporter of Trinidad and Tobago’s Black Power Movement—was fatally shot by police during a demonstration at Woodford Square. His killing, which occurred as he reportedly pleaded with officers not to arrest another protester, sparked national outrage and became a turning point for the Black Power Revolution in the country.

This was followed by on 13 April with the resignation of A. N. R. Robinson, Member of Parliament for Tobago East who stepped down in protest over the government’s handling of the Black Power Movement and its failure to implement meaningful reforms.

On 18 April, predominantly Indo-Trinidadian sugar workers, represented by the All Trinidad Sugar Estates and Factory Workers Union—went on strike in response to the killing of Basil Davis, as well as longstanding issues of unfair treatment, lack of job security, and poor working conditions. Their action marked a powerful show of solidarity with Afro-Trinidadian protesters involved in the Black Power Movement. The shared outrage and unified demand for justice helped bridge ethnic divides, strengthening the bond between the two major communities and intensifying calls for national reform.

In response to this, Prime Minister Eric Williams at the time proclaimed a State of Emergency the 21 of April and arrested 15 Black Power leaders. Responding in turn, a portion of the Trinidad Defence Force, led by Raffique Shah and Rex Lassalle, mutinied and took hostages at the army barracks at Teteron. Through the action of the Coast Guard and negotiations between the Government and the rebels, the mutiny was contained and the mutineers surrendered on 25 April. It was around this time that the term Afro-Trinidadian started to be used.

== History ==
In 1498, Christopher Columbus landed on the island of Trinidad, where he encountered various groups of Indigenous people. Shortly after Columbus's arrival, Trinidad became a territory of the Spanish Empire. The Spanish enslaved the native population and, over time, intermingled with them, leading to the emergence of the Mestizo identity. The term "Mulatto" originated when Europeans began transporting enslaved Africans to Trinidad and mixing with them in 1517, via the Atlantic slave trade.

In 1783, the King of Spain enacted the Cedula of Population law, which promised free land to Europeans willing to relocate to Trinidad to work. This law encouraged French settlers from the French Antilles to migrate to Trinidad and establish sugar cane plantations. These settlers contributed to the island's diverse ancestry, giving rise to the Creole identity. Languages spoken included Spanish, French, and Antillean Creole (Patois).

After emancipation in 1838, many Afro-Trinidadians left the plantations and settled in towns, villages, and developing urban centres across Trinidad. Significant migration took place to areas such as Port of Spain and San Fernando, where job opportunities were growing. Others moved to Arima, Chaguanas and Princes Town, while oil-rich regions, including Point Fortin, Fyzabad and La Brea, later attracted Afro-Trinidadians seeking employment in the energy sector. Some, particularly the Merikins (descendants of freed African-American soldiers), established their own villages in areas such as Moruga and south Trinidad. These movements helped shape the social and geographic landscape of post-emancipation Trinidad.

In the 1840s, European indentured servants began arriving, including the French, Spanish, Germans, Swiss, Portuguese, English, Scottish, Welsh, Cornish, Irish, Corsican, Italians, Dutch, Norwegian, and Polish. Over time, many of these settlers intermarried with the families of freed Afro-Trinidadian slaves, contributing to the island's mixed population and ethnic diversity within the Afro-Trinidadian demographic.

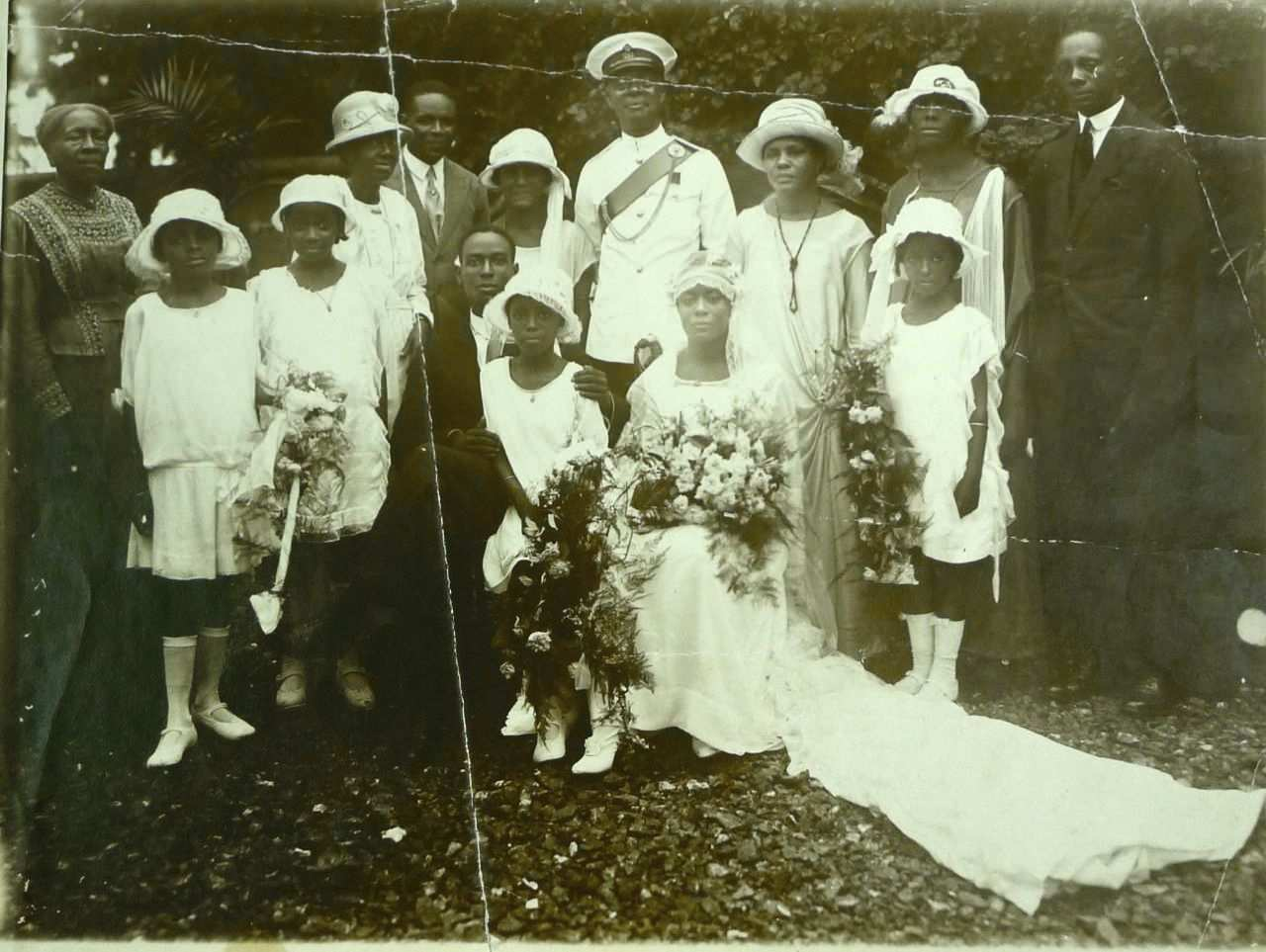
Trinidadian Pan-Africanist George Padmore and Julia Semper on their wedding day, 1924.

On 30 May 1845, the British transported indentured servants from India to Trinidad. This day is known as Indian Arrival Day. A portion of this group of Indians began to racially mix into the already mixed Afro-Trinidadian populace, and their descendants became known as the Dougla people. After the system of indentured servitude was abolished in 1917, a second group of Indians steadily migrated to Trinidad from India, mostly for business.

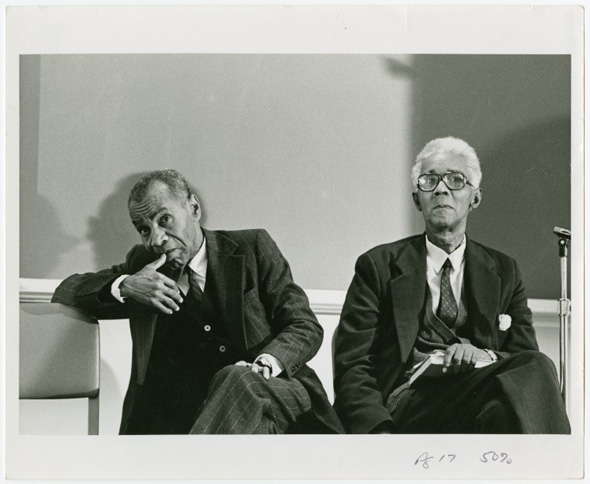
Afro-Trinidadian intellectual C. L. R. James (left) with French Guianese poet Léon Damas at the 2nd Congress of Afrikan People in San Diego, 1972—a gathering of global Black thinkers, writers and activists.

Other notable Afro-Trinidadian political figures include Isabel Ursula Teshea, the first woman to serve in the House of Representatives and as a cabinet minister, and Camille Robinson-Regis, a long-serving member of parliament and minister in various portfolios. Their contributions have been vital in advancing social justice and political representation for Afro-Trinidadians.

Afro-Trinidadians have been central to the political leadership of Trinidad and Tobago since independence. They’ve dominated national politics through key parties like the People’s National Movement (PNM), founded by Dr. Eric Williams, the country's first Prime Minister and "Father of the Nation". Other notable Afro-Trinidadian leaders include A. N. R. Robinson, who served as both Prime Minister and President, and Patrick Manning, known for his contributions to economic development. Dr. Keith Rowley, who served as Prime Minister from 2015 to 2025, continued this legacy, focusing on economic diversification and regional leadership. Their leadership has helped shape the country’s institutions, policies, and national identity.

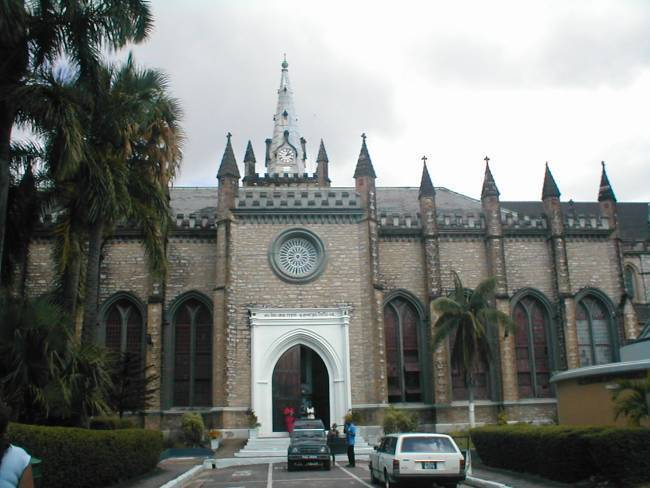
Cathedral in Trinidad and Tobago

== Religion ==
Majority of Afro-Trinidadian and Tobagonians are Christian, with the largest group being Roman Catholics 60%, and (in Tobago) Methodists 31%. Smaller numbers follow Afro-Caribbean syncretic faiths such as Rastafari and the Spiritual Baptist Church. Non-Christians include adherents of Islam, the Orisha-Shango faith, Trinidadian Vodunu, other Afro-Caribbean religions, the Baháʼí Faith, Hinduism or are followers of Sai Baba.

== See also ==
- Slavery in the British and French Caribbean
- Creole peoples
- Dougla people
- Demographics of Trinidad and Tobago
