= Trinidadian and Tobagonian British =

Trinidadian and Tobagonian British people
Total population
- Trinidad and Tobago-born residents 21,283 (2001 Census); 25,000 (2013 ONS estimate)

Regions with significant populations
- Throughout the UK, in particular Greater London, West Midlands and Greater Manchester

Languages
- English (British English, Trinidadian English), Trinidadian Hindustani

Religion
- Christianity, Hinduism, Islam, Rastafari

Related ethnic groups
- British African-Caribbean community, British Indo-Caribbean community, Black British, Black African, Multiracial, Indo-Trinidadians, Afro-Trinidadians, Trinidadian and Tobagonian Americans, Trinidadian and Tobagonian Canadians, Indian British, Asian British, British Chinese

Trinidadian and Tobagonian British people are citizens or residents of the United Kingdom whose ethnic origins lie fully or partially in Trinidad and Tobago.

== Demographics ==
=== Population ===
21,283 Trinidad and Tobago-born people were living in the UK at the time of the 2001 Census. The 2011 Census recorded 22,872 Trinidad and Tobago-born residents in England and Wales. The censuses of Scotland and Northern Ireland recorded 663 and 62 Trinidad and Tobago-born residents respectively. More recent estimates by the Office for National Statistics put the figure at 25,000 in 2013.

== See also ==
- Trinidad and Tobago–United Kingdom relations
- Black British people
- British Indians
- British Chinese
