= Isabel Ursula Teshea =

Afro-Trinidadian social worker, human rights activist and politician

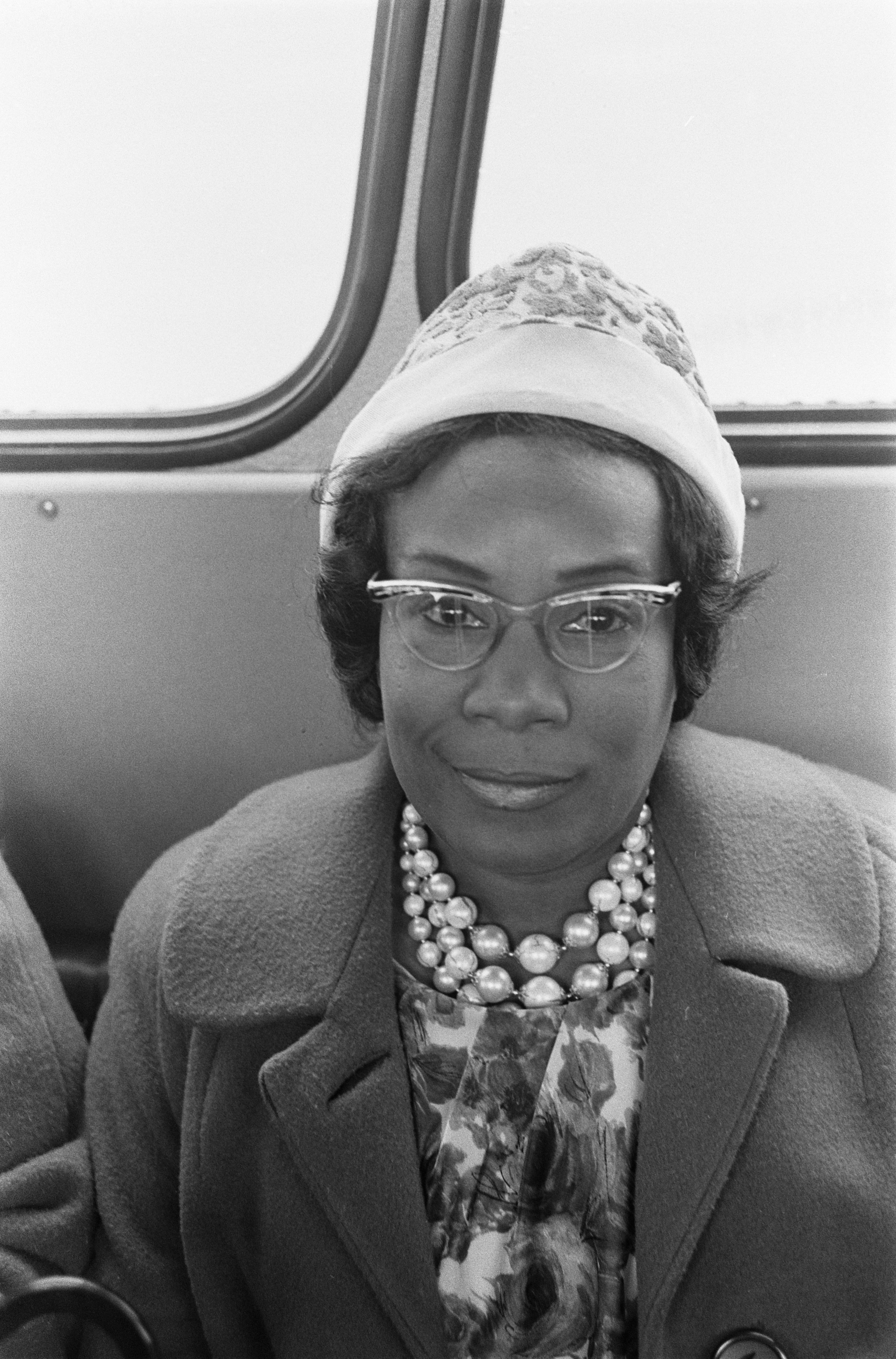
- Born: Isabel Ursula Cadogan; 24 July 1911; San Fernando, Trinidad, British West Indies
- Died: 14 April 1981 (aged 69); Port of Spain, Trinidad
- Other names: Isabel Teshea
- Occupations: social worker, politician
- Years active: 1923–1977
- Known for: first woman to serve in the House of Representatives, as a cabinet Minister and as an ambassador for Trinidad and Tobago.

Isabel Ursula Teshea, TC (24 July 1911 – 14 April 1981) was an Afro-Trinidadian social worker, human rights activist, and politician. One of the founders of the People's National Movement, she served as vice chair of the party and was the first woman to hold the office. When Trinidad and Tobago gained its independence from Britain, she ran as a candidate, becoming the first woman elected in the newly established House of Representatives. She became the first woman cabinet Minister and later ambassador for the country. Posthumously, she was awarded the Trinity Cross, the highest honor of the country.

== Early life ==
Isabel Ursula Cadogan was born on 24 July 1911 in San Fernando, on the island of Trinidad, in the British West Indies's colony of Trinidad and Tobago, to Maude and Thomas Cadogan. Her father was a tailor and soon after her birth, the family moved to Princes Town, where Cadogan grew up and attended the Government Primary School. Having little access to secondary education, common in the country at that time, Cadogan continued her education under the pupil-teacher system. While working as a student teacher, she began organizing student clubs arranging concerts, dances and speaking events. She founded a boys’ club in Princes Town and worked on numerous charitable events to assist the underprivileged in her local parish, through St. Stephen's Anglican Church.

== Career ==
Upon completing her schooling, Cadogan began working at the dairy of the Petit Morne Sugar Estate in Sainte Madeleine, working her way up to a clerk in the plantation sugar office. After some years, she moved to Port of Spain and began working at Perreira's and Company, as an inventory control clerk. She enrolled in courses at the University of Puerto Rico and then on 24 September 1938, married George McGregor Teshea. Teshea joined the Teachers' Education and Cultural Association (TECA), the People's Education Movement (PEM) and the Federation of Women's Institutes (FWI), becoming politically active. These women's organizations were focused on education and providing social services throughout the island. In 1955, during the push for decolonization, the PEM was reorganized as the women's arm of the People's National Movement. Going door-to-door Teshea and other women campaigned and organized fundraisers for candidates. She also worked as a researcher, reading transcripts of speeches of British Parliamentarians, known as the Hansard, to assist in the writing of speeches.

Teshea had developed a network of ties with various village councils and became a valuable asset to Eric Williams in the formation of the People's National Movement (PNM). Teshea was appointed as one of the vice chairs of the party in 1956 and simultaneously became chair of the PNM Women's League, as well as the FWI. Her marriage dissolved in 1959, and Teshea devoted more time to politics, coming to national prominence. When Trinidad and Tobago gained their independence and elections were held in 1961, Teshea, frustrated that women's roles had theretofore been limited to supporting male candidates, ran for a seat in the Port of Spain East District, winning by more than 7,000 votes. Her election to the newly established House of Representatives, made her the first woman to serve in that capacity in Trinidad. Appointed as parliamentary secretary, she served in the Ministry of Local Government and Community Development. The department maintained responsibility for ensuring for health, water, and sanitation needs of the island.

In 1963, Williams, who was Prime Minister, reorganized his cabinet, making Teshea the Minister of Health and Housing, the first woman to serve as a Minister in the country. During her tenure she put a number of initiatives in place to improve educational opportunity; provide cultural, home economic and moral training; and promote racial harmony between the Afro- and Indo-Trinidadian and Tobagonian communities. She toured the major African states with Prime Minister Williams in 1964 and was featured in a women's magazine in Senegal during the trip. Two years later, when her Ministry was split into the Ministry of Health and the Ministry of Housing, Teshea was assigned responsibility for both portfolios, which she served until 1970. She shared responsibilities in the Ministry of Health with Dr. Leonard Comissiong, the island's chief medical officer.

Teshea was appointed as ambassador to Ethiopia in 1969, the first woman ambassador from Trinidad. Zambia was added to her ambassadorial duties and she served the posts until 1971, when she returned to Trinidad and was appointed as Minister of Education and Culture, serving in that office through 1975. In 1974, she was appointed as high commissioner of Guyana and retained that post, though made Trinidad and Tobago's ambassador to Senegal in 1975. While serving in Guyana, she participated in the regional negotiations which led to the establishment of Caricom. She served through 1976 in Senegal and through 1977 in Guayana before retiring from public life.

== Death and legacy ==
Teshea died 14 April 1981 and was posthumously awarded four months after her death Trinidad's highest honor, the Trinity Cross. Teshea did not consider herself a woman's rights activist, though she often worked to improve the status of women. She described herself as "not a feminist by definition, but a believer in …'human rights'".
