= Trinidadian Vodunu =

Afro-diasporic religion practiced in Trinidad and Tobago

Trinidadian Vodunu, also known as Rada Feast or Rada, is the practice of Vodun, a traditional West African religion, as it is observed in Trinidad and Tobago, particularly within the Rada community.

== History ==
Trinidadian Vodunu has its roots in the Kingdom of Dahomey (present-day Benin) in West Africa. The religion was brought to Trinidad and Tobago by African individuals who arrived on the islands after the formal end of slavery. One notable figure in the establishment of the Rada community, where Trinidadian Vodunu thrived, was Abojevi Zahwenu, also known as Papa Nanee. He arrived unchained aboard a Portuguese slaver and established the Dangbwe Comme Compound in Belmont, Trinidad, in 1868, which became a spiritual base for the Rada people. The compound has remained a significant center for the practice of Trinidadian Vodunu to this day.

== Practices ==
Trinidadian Vodunu encompasses various rituals and ceremonies. Seasonal and non-seasonal sacrificial ceremonies, known as Vodunu or Saraka, are central to the practice. These ceremonies involve the offering of sacrifices to deities and ancestors, with animals such as hens, pigeons, morrocoys (turtles), goats, or cows being prepared and offered. The preparation of these sacrifices takes place in the kitchen adjacent to the sacred shrines. Animal sacrifice holds symbolic importance, and the blood is ritually consumed, following a distinctive method where the blood is fried and eaten.

The Rada community places emphasis on sacred drumming during rituals, with skilled drummers playing consecrated drums as a means to connect with the spirit world.

Syncretism is another significant aspect of Trinidadian Vodunu, where elements of Catholicism are integrated into the practice. Images of Christian saints and crucifixes can often be found alongside traditional African religious objects within the vodunkwe, the house of the gods.

== Priesthood ==
Within Trinidadian Vodunu, there is a spiritual hierarchy led by a hubono, the spiritual leader or priest. The hubono plays a crucial role in guiding the community and maintaining the religious customs and traditions. Notable hubonos of the Rada community include Papa Nanee, Achovi, Padonu, Sobo, Sedley Antoine, and the current hubono, Henry Antoine. The hubono is responsible for conducting rituals, leading ceremonies, preserving knowledge and traditions, and ensuring the continuity of the Trinidadian Vodunu tradition.
