= Spanish language in Trinidad and Tobago =

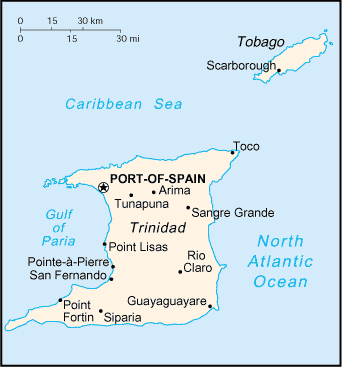
Trinidad and Tobago

In 2014, Spanish was the native language of around 4,000 people (or 0.3% of the total population) living in Trinidad and Tobago. The number has grown substantially referred to the massive immigration of Venezuelans due to the ongoing crisis in that country.

== Spanish presence in the country ==
Texts document the existence of a small Spanish-speaking community present in some parts of the island even in the 20th century, but it may be an erroneous statement due to the knowledge of the language by the citizens, due to trade with Venezuela.

Parang (parranda, in Spanish) music characterizes Trinidad and Tobago Christmas and is reflected in traditional Spanish songs and Hispanic folk dances. The origin of parang is discussed. Some maintain that the custom was introduced by Spain during the Spanish colonial era of Trinidad (1498-1797). Others believe that its roots are in trade with Venezuela. At Christmas many parang bands sing throughout the country and dance to the music.

== Current situation ==
Due to the country's proximity to the coast of Venezuela, the country is currently slowly developing a relationship with Spanish-speaking peoples, and therefore the government requires that Spanish be taught in secondary education. Specifically, in 2004, when the government appointed Spanish as the first foreign language, launched in March 2005. Currently, an estimated 5% of the country's inhabitants speak Spanish.
