= Trinidadian Creole =

English-based creole language spoken in Trinidad

Trinidadian Creole English
- Native to: Trinidad and Tobago
- Region: Trinidad
- Native speakers: 1,000,000 (2011)
- Language family: English-African and Indian Creole: Guinea Coast Creole English; Caribbean Creole English; Eastern Caribbean; Barbados-Eustatius; Barbados-Trinidad; Trinidadian Creole English

Language codes
- ISO 639-3: trf
- Glottolog: trin1276
- Linguasphere: 52-ABB-au

Trinidadian Creole is an Caribbean English-based creole language commonly spoken throughout the island of Trinidad in Trinidad and Tobago. It is distinct from Tobagonian Creole – particularly at the basilectal level – and from other Lesser Antillean creoles.

English is the country's official language (the national standard variety is Trinidadian and Tobagonian English), but the main spoken languages are Trinidadian Creole and Tobagonian Creole. Prior to English being designated as the country’s official language, a French mixed with formerly enslaved African languages type of Creole was more prominent throughout the island amongst former slaves.

English became the country's official language in 1823. Consequently, government and educational institutions endorsement of the language change significantly and influenced the progressive transition and phaseout of the former French mixed Creole to an English based Creole, that is now more widely spoken.

Both creoles contain elements from a variety of other languages, brought to the island over time by mostly West African slaves and Indian indentured laborers. As of 2011, there were 1 million native speakers.

== History ==
Like other Caribbean English-based creoles, Trinidadian Creole English has a primarily English-derived vocabulary. In the mid-nineteenth century, when the use of slavery was demolished, people from China, Portuguese islands, Venezuela, Madeira, India, west Africa, Syria and Lebanon were used as labourers for the island. The island also has a creole with a largely French lexicon, which was in widespread use until the late nineteenth century, when it started to be gradually replaced, due to influence and pressure from the British.

Arawakn, Hindustani, Cariban, French Creole (Patois), Spanish and West African languages have also influenced the language, to varying degrees. In addition, Trinidadian linguist Jo-Anne Ferreira sees occasional words influenced by Arabic and Chinese.

== Phonological features ==
Although there is considerable variation, some generalizations can be made about the speech of Trinidad:

- Like a number of related creoles, Trinidadian English Creole is non-rhotic, meaning that /r/ does not occur after vowels, except in recent loanwords or names from Spanish, Hindi/Bhojpuri, and Arabic.
- In mesolectal forms, cut, cot, caught, and curt are all pronounced with [ɒ].
- The dental fricatives of English are replaced with dental/alveolar stops.
- Trinidad English Creole is usually syllable-timed and not stress-timed; therefore it often has full vowels where Standard English has the reduced form /ə/.
- Although, there is no clear connection between pitch and stress, words of Trinidad English Creole are marked by a stress-initial syllable.

== Vowels ==
	front	central	back
close	i ɪ	ʊ	u
close-mid	e	ə	o
open-mid	ɛ	ɜ ʌ	ɔ
open		a ɑ	ɒ

== Consonants ==
		Labial	Alveolar	Palatal	Velar	Glottal
Stop	voiceless	p	t		k	
Stop	voiced	b	d	dʒ	g	
Fricative		f	s	ʃ		h
Nasal		m	n		ŋ	
Approximant		w	l	j		
Rhotic			r			

== Morphological features ==
- Trinidad English Creole verbs do not use marks for people or numbers {-ed}, {-s}.

== Usage ==
Both Trinidad and Tobago feature creole continua between more conservative Creole forms and forms much closer to Trinidadian English, with the former being more common in spontaneous speech and the latter in more formal speech. Trinidad English Creole is one of the first languages learnt for most speakers. Trinidadian English is introduced in primary schools which are carried out in standardized English. Because of the social values attributed to linguistic forms, the more common varieties (that is, more creolized forms) carry little prestige in certain contexts.

== Example words and phrases ==
- allyuh: you all
- back chat: insolence
- bacchanal: any incident or time marked by drama, scandal, confusion or conflict
- bad-john: a bully or gangster.
- bazoodee: light-headed, in shock, or crazy.
- bhowgie/bhauji: Indian sister-in-law (brother's wife), but is also used to address any slightly older Indo-Trinidadian woman than oneself.
- bobolee: someone easily taken advantage of; also used to refer to an effigy made on Good Friday that is beaten and used to represent Judas and traitors.
- broughtupsy/brought-upsie: good manners, proper upbringing or home training.
- buss-up shut: another name for Paratha from its resemblance to a bursted shirt when the paratha is clapped after cooking.
- calypso: a musical or lyrical comment on something, particularly popular during Carnival.
- chamkay: to dance and shake the waist originally meant to shine
- chinksin: miserly; distributing less than one could or should.
- chupidee: a stupid foolish person.
- churile: a wretched women; also a ghost of a pregnant women in local folklore.
- comess: drama and confusion.
- cunumunu: awkward or idiot.
- daru: rum
- dhansirya: a woman who wastes money.
- dheere-dheere: slow
- dingolay: cheerful dance that involves fast paced movements.
- donkey years: a very long time ago.
- dotish: stupid or incompetent.
- Dougla: a person having both Indian and African parentage.
- doux-doux/doo-doo: sweetheart or darling.
- dulaha: Indian bridegroom
- dulahin: Indian bride; also used to call a newlywed Indo-Trinidadian woman by her husband and in-laws.
- fête: party
- ganja: cannabis
- goat-mouth: to have or give bad luck with one's words.
- jahaji: the literal meaning is "of the ship"; used to refer to the Indian indentured laborers.
- horn: infidelity
- jhanjat: confusion
- jumbee: a ghost or demonic spirit.
- junjunnee: cramp
- korhee: lazy
- kuchur: trouble
- labar-labar/lab-lab: to do carelessly.
- licks: a physical beating or a strict spanking.
- lime/limming: to relax and hangout.
- Madrassi: a person with South Indian heritage.
- macco: someone who gets into other people's business.
- maljo/mal yeaux: a sickness manifested upon newborn babies and young animals (like puppies) out of envy or ill wishes.
- mamaguy: to deceive or mislead by flattery.
- mamoo: Indian maternal uncle; also used to refer to any older Indo-Trinidadian man.
- najar: evil eye
- nara: abdominal pain
- neemakharam: ingrate
- ole' talk/old talk: superficial chatting
- pothound: a mongrel dog of no specific breed or whose breed is unknown; mutt.
- poohar: sloppy or untidy.
- quelbe/quelba/quilbay: a kind of African dance possibly of Congo origin, comprising songs, drumming and dances performed by women.
- rachifee/ratcheefi/ratchifi/rachify: something done in a makeshift, careless, or slightly devious way.
- tabanca: heartbreak
- tanty/tantie: aunt
- tarkari/talkari: any vegetarian curry dish.
- toting feelings: not able to move on from a previous relationship.
- ups kabat: a type of game played with marbles, otherwise known as "marble pitch".
- Venee: Venezuelan
- wajang: someone with bad conduct or unworthy.
- whine: a dance involving gyrating of the hips.
- zaboca: avocado
