= Trinidadian French-Creole =

French Creole of Trinidad

Trinidadian French Creole
- Patwa or Patwa-La-Trinidad
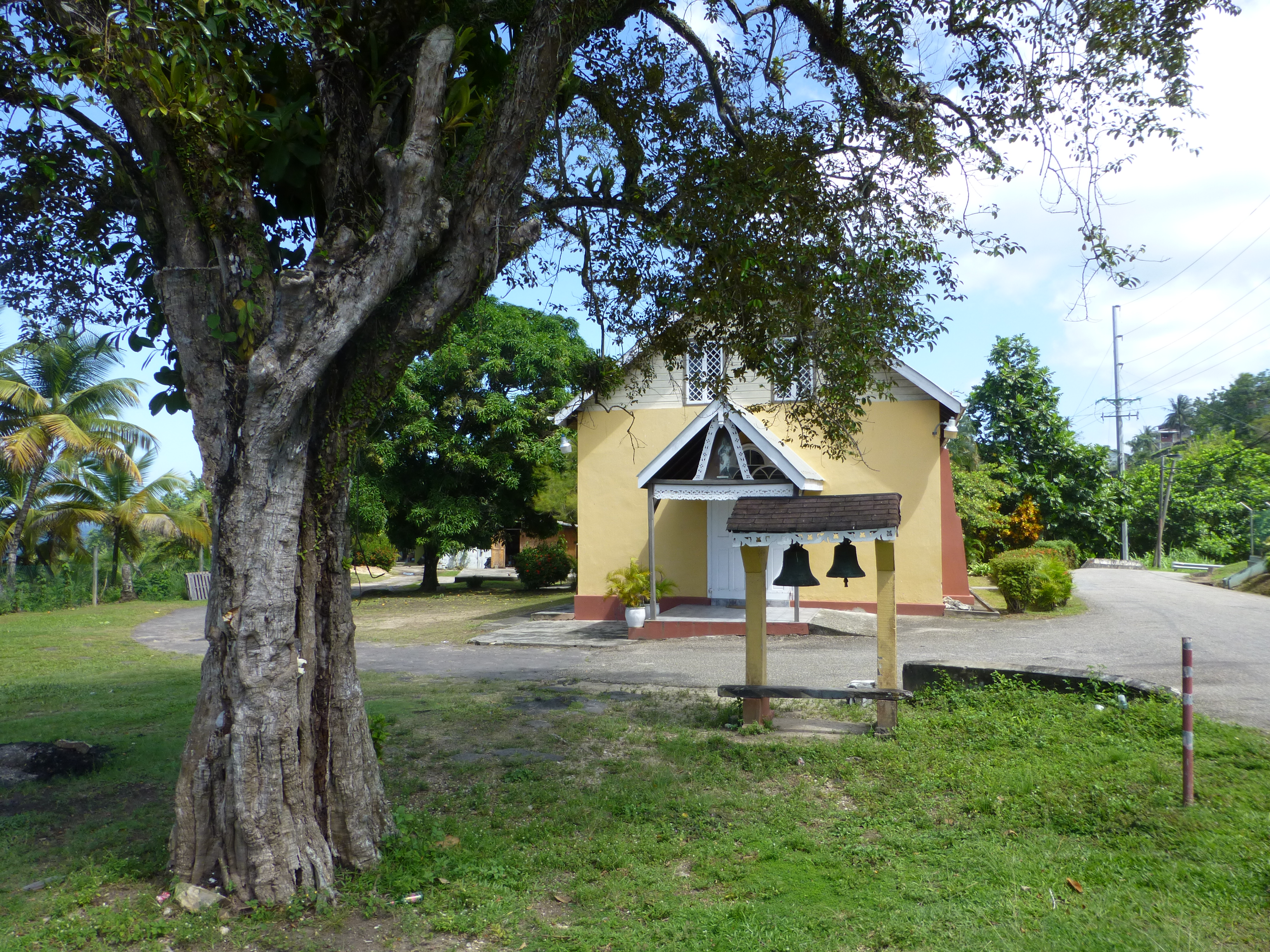
- A church in Blanchisseuse. Various churches in Trinidad still conduct mass in French Creole (Patwa)
- Native to: Trinidad and Tobago (mainly northern Trinidad)
- Native speakers: 3,800 (2022)
- Language family: French Creole: Antillean Creole; Trinidadian French Creole

Language codes
- ISO 639-3: None (mis)
- Glottolog: None

Trinidadian French Creole (also known as Patois or Patwa) is a French creole of Trinidad taken to Trinidad by French creole-speaking migrants from the islands such as Grenada, and the French Antilles, namely Guadeloupe and Martinique, and other French-colonised islands). All the creoles have slight differences in words, especially with regional dialects. Trinidad also has different ways to say or spell the same word in Creole.

== History ==
The Cedula of Population of 1783 laid the foundation and growth of the population of Trinidad. French planters and the Africans they enslaved, free coloureds and mulattos, from the French Antilles of Dominica, Grenada, Guadeloupe and Martinique, migrated to Trinidad during the French Revolution (5 May 1789 to 9 November 1799). The immigrants established communities in Arima, Blanchisseuse, Carenage, Cascade, Champs Fleurs, Laventille, Paramin, etc. Trinidad's population, which numbered less than 1,400 in 1777, soared to over 15,000 by the end of 1789.

In 1797, Trinidad became a British crown colony, with a large French-speaking and Patois-speaking population. Today, Trinidadian French Creole can be found spoken in regional pockets among the elders, particularly in the villages of Paramin, Lopinot and Talparo. Other rural and fishing villages also have French Creole remnants. The language is facing a slow revival in some of these villages. The language was the lingua franca for parts of Trinidad for many decades in the 19th and early 20th centuries. The language is still spoken in Paramin, Blanchisseuse and other smaller villages, and there are efforts both online and in person (schools) to try preserve and revitalise it.

Singers such as Mighty Sparrow have sung in Trinidadian Creole (which is very similar to other Creoles, most notably Grenadian Creole French). Songs such as 'Gade Zinah' and 'Par Quiea Mweh (Pa Kwiyé Mwen)' are sung exclusively in Trinidadian French Creole.

Many Trinidadians went to Venezuela through the late 18th and 19th centuries, and took French and English Creole along with them and hence known as Venezuelan French Creole, which is also a dying language variety which has ongoing preservation efforts.

== Grammar ==
=== Alphabet ===
The Creole alphabet is very similar to the English and French alphabet. However, there are some differences. The first is the absence of the letters “C”, “Q”, “U” and “X”, and another difference is the inclusion of a few extra letters. The alphabet is as follows:

Letter in Creole	Letter in Creole word	Creole word translation	Closest English equivalent
A	Ba	To give	Attack
An	Tan	Time	”Uh” (Nasal sound)
B	Bazodi	Dazed	Bank
Ch	Chapo	Hat	Ship
D	Doudou	Darling	Dump
Dj	Djab	Devil	Jump (hard J)
E	Paime	Paime (a Trinidadian dish)	Cheese
É	Édé	To help	”Eh” (with a rise in tone at the end)
È	Lè	When	fest
En	Enmen	To like/love	Enter
F	Fou-fou	Crazy	Fat
G	Gangang	Grandmother	Great
H	Hòtòto-so	To liberally (too much)	Him
I	Itali	Italy	Universe
J	Janbé	To jump/cross over	Japan
K	Klas	Class	Kick
L	Lanmou	To love (another word for “to Love”)	Lick
M	Mako	Nosey	Make
N	Nèg	Black/black person	Nice
Ng	Lanng	Tongue/Language	Sang
O	Obliyé	Must	Bot
Ò	Ògannizé	To organise	Door
On	Nonk/Tonton	Uncle	On
Ou	Ouvé	To open	You
P	Paski	Because	Perchance
R	Roro	Row (uproar)	Right
S	Si	If	Sat
T	Tanbou/Tambou	Drum	Track
Tj	Tjè	Heart	”Tch”
V	Vann	To sell	Van
W	Woulé	To roll	What
Y	Yonn	One	Yes
Z	Zabòka	Avocado	Zoom

=== Nouns and articles ===
In Trinidadian French Creole the word 'yon/on' is added to the front of a noun as an indefinite article (so 'a' or 'an'). For example, 'yon bato' means 'a boat' or 'yon-chouval' means 'a horse'. There is no significant difference between 'yon' or 'on', although yon is used more often.

The word for the definite article ('the') is added on the end of a word (as a suffix) instead of at the front like with 'Yon'. So in Trinidadian, to say 'the boat' would result in 'bato-a'. If the word ends in a vowel then '-a is added instead of '-a' so instead of 'misyé-a' the correct form would be 'misyé-la' ('the gentleman'). There are also other forms of the definite article such as “-an” and “-lan” but they are not used as often.

The possessive is also added as a suffix, for example the phrase 'my house' would be 'lakay-mwen'. Adjectives usually come after the word they describe 'fanm-a bon' (the good woman), although sometimes Creole takes the English sentence structure and so the adjective can come before the word it describes, hence byen fanm-a could also be acceptable.

=== Negatives ===
To make something negative then 'pa' — similar to the French pas — is placed before the verb. Examples are below:
Mwen pa palé

=== Verbs ===
Most verbs end in “é” such as “chanté” and “manjé”, so they are similar to French, and there are also irregular verbs which end in other letters such as “vini” (to come) or “bizwen” (to need). The verbs do not change regardless of number or when the action takes place.

==== Sample Verbs ====
- Alé: to go
- Ataké: Attack
- Bizwen: (Irregular) to need
- Chanté: to sing
- Degouté: to dislike
- Édé: to help
- Hayi: to hate
- Enmen: to love
- Mové: to be malicious (can also be used as an adjective)
- Manjé: to eat

=== Gender ===
French Creole does not have grammatical gender, but it has lexical gender. Some words of French origin can be gendered such as Milat and Milatwès (Mulatto male and Mulatto female). However, verbs, nouns and adjectives never change due to the gender of the speaker or person being mentioned.

=== Pronouns ===
The pronouns of Trinidadian French Creole are the exact same as most other Creoles (with only small differences from the neighbouring Grenadian French Creole).

In English	In Creole	Example	Example translation
I/my/me	Mwen	Mwen sa chou-chou	I can whisper
You	Ou	Ou sa hay	You can hate
He/she/it	I/Li	I sé yon kounoumounou	He is an idiot
We/us	Nou	Nou enmen jwé	We like to play
You (pl)	Zòt / Zò	Zò sé moun sòt	You people are silly
They/them/their	Yo	Yo sé kamawad-mwen	They are my friends

To form the possessive pronoun (words such as “yours” or “mine”) the relevant possessive pronoun is added to the word “sla” for example the word for “yours” is “sla-ou” (sometimes shortened to “sla’w”). For the plural form it is necessary to add “a” “an” or “la” after the word. For example, “yours” plural would be sla’w-a.

=== Tenses ===
In Creole the verb does not change depending on who or when the action is being done, but the word before the verb does (ka/ké/té ka etc.).

Tense in Creole	Example	Example translation
Ka	Mwen ka alé	I am going (present tense)
No Tense marker (although sometime “Té” is used)	Mwen alé	I went (simple past tense)
Té	Mwen té alé	I had gone (pluperfect tense)
Té ka	Mwen té ka alé	I was going/I used to go (imperfect tense)
Ka alé	Mwen ka alé alé	I am going to go (immediate future tense)
Kay/ké	Mwen kay/ké alé	I will go (simple future tense)

== Sample vocabulary ==
Most words in Trinidadian French Creole are derived from French. However, some come from other sources. The ones from different sourced are marked with a note below.

- Jouvé: daybreak of carnival
- Bakanal: raucous party (sometimes used to mean 'crazy')
- Dingolay: carefree dancing/to fall over
- Karnaval: Carnival
- Kaka: (vulgar) faeces (African-derived)
- Djab: devil
- Bondjé/bondyé: good god/good lord
- Mako: nosey
- Dlo: water
- Mwen: me/I/myself
- Ou: you
- i/li: he/she/it
- Nou: we (plural)
- Zòt: you (plural)
- Yo: they
- Manjé: to eat
- Kwiyé: to call
- Obiyah/obeah: magic medicine
- Tjwé: to kill
- Chouval: horse
- Ninnin: riddle (African-derived)
- Wanga: magic charm (African-derived)
- Doudou darling/sweetheart
- Konnèt: to know (someone, place)
- Sav: To know (something, how to do something)
- Sòti: to come from
- Balyé: broom
- Chanté: to sing

=== Sample sayings ===
Some regularly used sayings in Trinidadian French-Creole:

- Tonné ka fè pè mé zéklè ka tjwé: The thunder frightens, but the lightning smites (Thunder makes fear but the lightning kills)
- Makak konnèt ki bwa monté [or] Makak konnè ki bwa monté: Monkey knows which tree to climb
- Makak sav ki pyé-bwa i ka monté: Monkey knows which tree of wood it climbs (“Sav” is commonly used in French Guiana, Martinique and Guadeloupe but other islands also use it as well as “Konné”)
- Sé bouch kabwit ki ka wand kabwit: The goat betrays itself by its own voice (Is the mouth of the goat that betrays the goat).
- Sé yon-vole ki ka twapé lót: It takes a thief to catch a thief (Is a thief that captures another).

== Food names taken from Trinidadian French-Creole ==
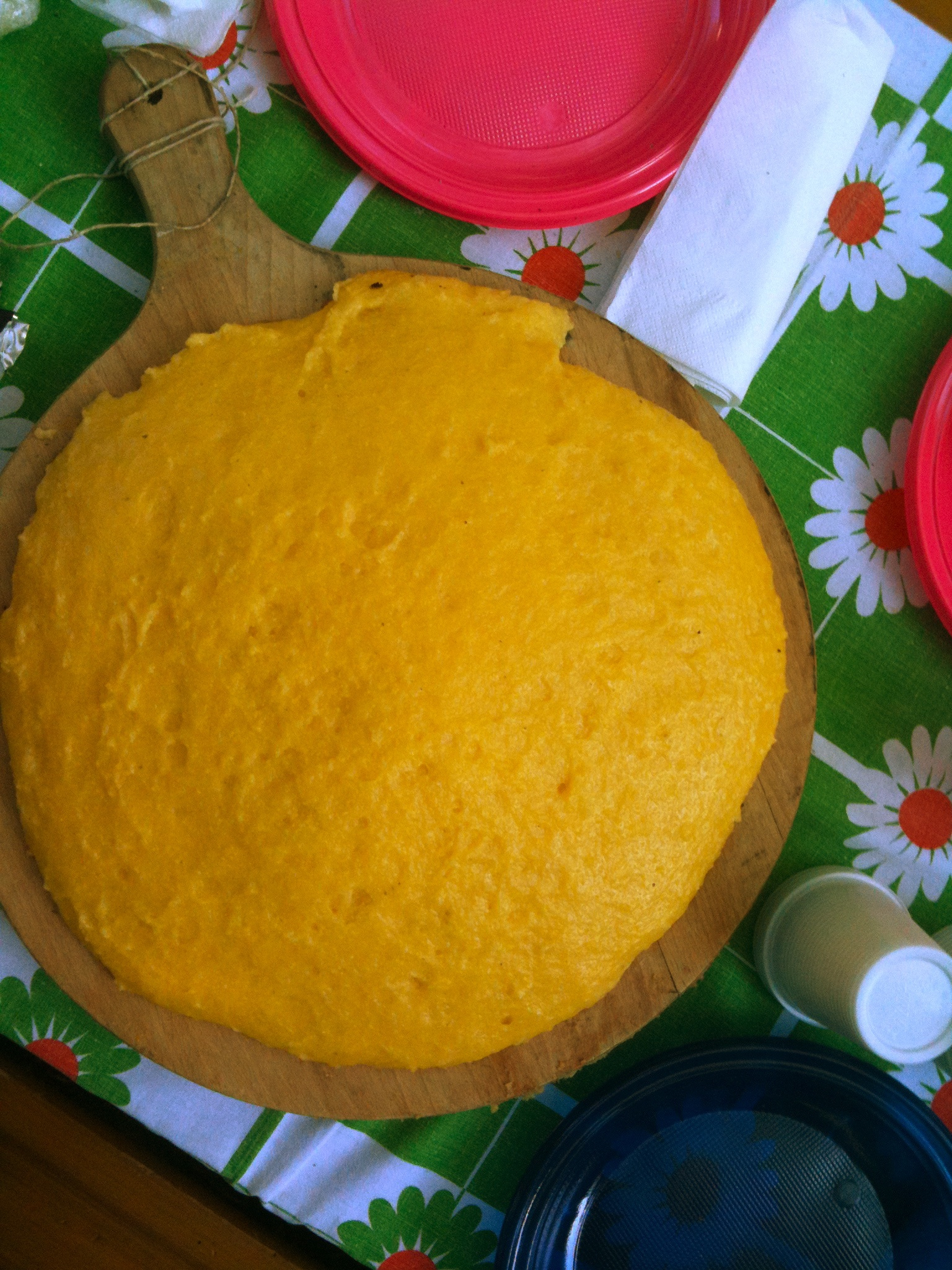
Cornmeal (Known as “Timi” in Creole) is eaten across the Caribbean and is the base for the Trinidadian sweet treat “Paime”

Trinidad is known for its diverse food. Some foods are habitually referred to using their French Creole names rather than in English, as the French Creole words have been borrowed by English and English Creole.

Callaloo is a dish with a mix of dasheen leaves, okra, crab and ham. This dish was originally part of the culture of French Creole life in Trinidad and other French-influenced islands, but now has a broader popularity and has been referred to as a "Trinidadian masterpiece". The word callaloo is found in other French Creole languages and in Portuguese, with a number of theories available as to the underlying etymology.

Pen mi (Pain Mi) or paime is a dish made of sugared cornflour mixed with other ingredients such as coconut, pumpkin, spices such as nutmeg among other ingredients, and made into a paste, then it is covered in banana leaves and cooked in boiling water (or steamed). Boiling water is known as “Bouya” in Trinidad and Grenada.

Doudou/Doudous mango (In English: Sweet-sweet mango): A type of Caribbean mango.

Zabwiko mango: Apricot mango
