= Tobagonian Creole =

English-based creole of Tobago

Tobagonian English Creole
- Native to: Trinidad and Tobago
- Region: Tobago
- Native speakers: 300,000 (2011)
- Language family: English-African Creole: Guinea Coast Creole English; Caribbean Creole English; Eastern Caribbean; Vincent-Grenadian Creole; Grenada-Tobago Creole; Tobagonian English Creole

Language codes
- ISO 639-3: tgh
- Glottolog: toba1282
- Linguasphere: 52-ABB-at

Tobagonian Creole is an English-based creole language and the generally spoken language in Tobago. It is distinct from Trinidadian Creole and closer to other Lesser Antillean creoles.

== See also ==
- Trinidadian English

== Sources ==
- James, Winford, 2001 Di NAR Nuh Deh-een.
- James, Winford 2001, A Signature of Tobagonian Speech.
