= Trinidadian and Tobagonian English =

Dialect of the English language used in Trinidad and Tobago

- Region: Trinidad and Tobago
- Language family: Indo-European: Germanic; West Germanic; North Sea Germanic; Anglo–Frisian; Anglic; English; Caribbean English; Trinidadian and Tobagonian English
- Early forms: Old English: Middle English; Early Modern English
- Dialects: Trinidadian English Creole; Tobagonian English Creole
- Writing system: Latin (English alphabet); Unified English Braille

Official status
- Official language in: Trinidad and Tobago (state language)

Language codes
- ISO 639-3: –
- Glottolog: None
- IETF: en-TT

Trinidadian and Tobagonian English (TE) or Trinidadian and Tobagonian Standard English is a standard dialect of English used in Trinidad and Tobago. Trinidadian and Tobagonian English co-exists with both non-standard varieties of English as well as other dialects, namely Trinidadian Creole in Trinidad and Tobagonian Creole in Tobago.

== History ==
Trinidadian English was initially based on a standard of British English, including having a non-rhotic accent. In the Americas, TE now uses many Americanisms, including apartment and trunk (of a car). It is understandable by speakers of international standard English, although it uses a number of terms that are unique to it (perhaps coming from Trinidadian Creole), such as "to lime," meaning "to hang out."

Speech in Trinidad (and, to some degree, in Tobago) may vary by location and circumstance and is often remarked for its "sing-song" (i.e., a rising and falling inflection) intonation. While this may be true, it is not fully clear what prosodic aspects results in this lay reaction from listeners, but it is suggested that both phonological and phonetic characteristics of Trinidadian English and Trinidadian Creole may play a role. Phonologically, Trinidadian English is said to have a high frequency of intonation such as phrase final rises in declarative utterances. Phonetically, the degree of pitch variation may also contribute to this "sing song" perception of the language variety.

== See also ==
- Regional accents of English speakers

== Sources ==
- Mendes, John (1986). Cote ce Cote la: Trinidad & Tobago Dictionary. Arima, Trinidad.
- Solomon, Denis. The Speech of Trinidad: A Reference Grammar (ISBN 9766200289). Port-of-Spain: UWI School of Continuing Studies, 1993.
- James, Winford, 2001, Trinidad and Tobago Standard English?.
- James, Winford, 2003, Doing our own thing with English I.
- James, Winford, 2003, Doing our own thing with English II.
- James, Winford, 2004, What kind of question is this?.
- James, Winford, 2004, What kind of question is this? Pt2.
