= Heights of Aripo Village =

Heights Of Aripo Village
- Location within Trinidad and Tobago

Highest point
- Coordinates: 10°40′00″N 61°13′00″W

Geography
- Country: Trinidad and Tobago
- State: Trinidad
- Settlement: Arima
- Parent range: Northern Range

Heights of Aripo Village is located in the Northern Range of the island of Trinidad. It is presumed this village, which lies in known Amerindian territory of the Nepuyo people, was at one point inhabited by first peoples. The work provided by later Cocoa Estates would have been a major draw for labour and settlers in the 20th century. Few of the Estate houses remain; many Cocoa Houses are still visible in the community: Either repurposed and inhabited, or dilapidated. Most of the villagers have moved away from cocoa production, though agricultural production still remains a big part of the community. The area is now the second largest producer of watercress on the island and the village has been working with The Caribbean Natural Resources Institute (CANARI) to further business opportunities for the village and help its sustainability.

== See also ==
- El Cerro del Aripo
- Geography of Trinidad and Tobago
