= Caroni Plain =

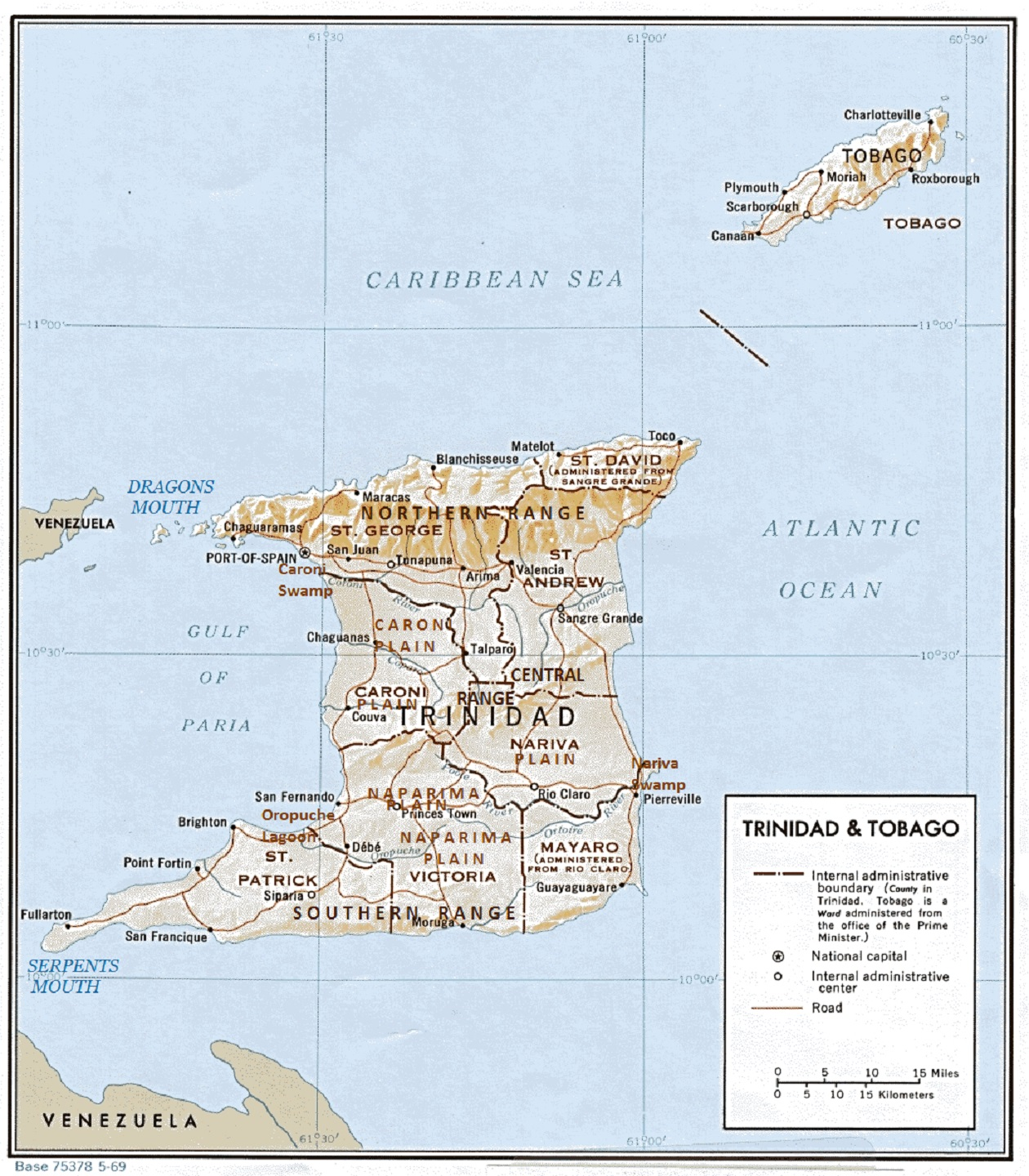
Physical relief map of Trinidad, showing the Caroni Plain in the northwest

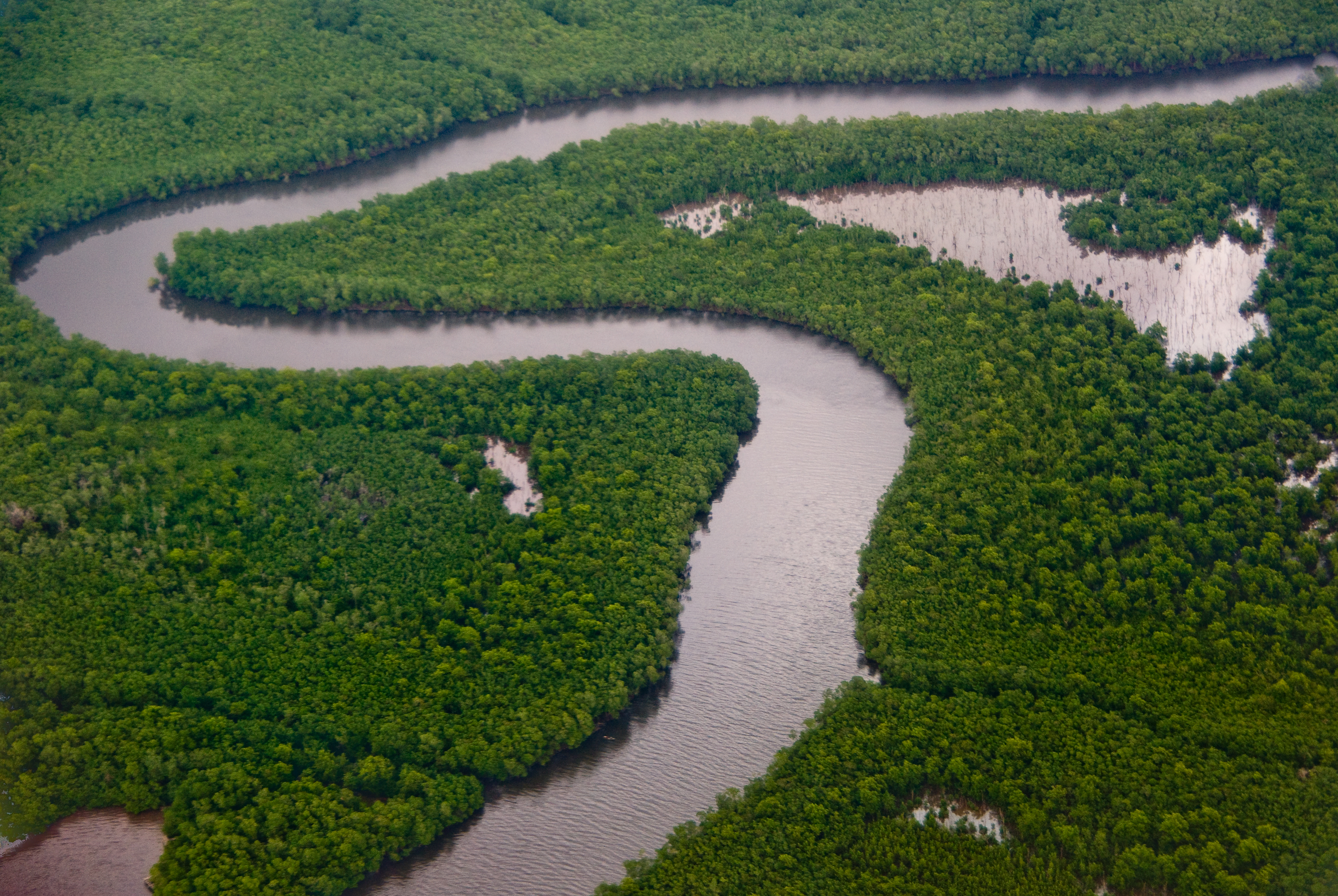
Aerial view of the Caroni Swamp on the northwestern Gulf of Paria coast of Trinidad

On the island of Trinidad in the Republic of Trinidad and Tobago, the Caroni Plain is a lowland area between the Northern Range and the Central Range. The lowland areas to the south of the Central Range are the Naparima Plain on the west and the Nariva Plain on the east. The lowland areas are either flat or consist of gently rolling hills. The 25-mile long Caroni river flows westward through the Caroni Plain and drains into the Caroni Swamp on the Gulf of Paria coast. The Caroni Plain was a major region of sugar and cocoa production in the 18th and 19th centuries and the first half of the 20th century.

== See also ==
- Nariva Swamp
- Southern Range
