= El Cerro del Aripo =

Mountain in Trinidad and Tobago

- Location within Trinidad and Tobago

Highest point
- Elevation: 940 m (3,080 ft)
- Prominence: 940 m (3,080 ft)
- Listing: Country high point
- Coordinates: 10°43′00″N 61°15′00″W

Geography
- Location: Trinidad and Tobago
- Region: Tunapuna–Piarco
- Parent range: Northern Range

El Cerro del Aripo, at 940 metres (3,084 ft), is the highest point in the Republic of Trinidad and Tobago. It is part of the Aripo Massif and is located in the Northern Range on the island of Trinidad, northeast of the town of Arima.

El Cerro del Aripo lies on the border of the St. George and St.Andrew Counties in the biodiverse Northern Range. Unlike many of Trinidad's mountain peaks, El Cerro del Aripo has a flat summit from which no views are available. Its climate is subtropical. Due to constant fog and cloud cover, temperature may decrease significantly at night compared to the lowlands, and the orographic influence of the Northern Range produces rainfall in the region that is the highest in the country, possibly exceeding 3500 mm per year. These climate factors of high rainfall, humidity (as fog and cloud), relatively lower temperatures and high winds permit the persistence of Elfin woodland and cloud forest at the summit, and tropical montane forest on the slopes and upper valleys below.

El Cerro del Aripo is home to the golden treefrog, only found in the highest peaks in Trinidad and the Paria Peninsula, Venezuela . The constant cloud/fog cover and lower temperatures associated with the region's high elevation and that support Cloud Forest or Elfin Woodland are also factors important to the survival of the elusive frog. It inhabits a type of water-collecting epiphytic bromeliad found at these elevations. Also restricted to the relatively cooler and wetter tropical cloud and montane forests of Cerro del Aripo and other higher reaches of the Northern Range is the endemic so-called Luminous Lizard Riama shrevei.

The mountain lies above the Heights of Aripo Village and Aripo and Guanapo river valleys. Springs that emanate from the Aripo Massif form the headwaters of the Caroni River's largest tributaries. The Guanapo river valley features interesting rock gorges associated with these fast flowing streams. The southern slopes and valleys below the Aripo Massif host a number of caves including the Aripo Cave. The Aripo Cave is home to a large oilbird colony, and features stunning stalactite and stalagmite formations.

El Cerro del Aripo is accessible for hikers, and is located near the world-famous Asa Wright Nature Centre. The centre is a bird-watching hotspot and is one of the most biodiverse areas in the West Indies and over 400 species of birds can be viewed from there.

== See also ==
- El Tucuche
