= Nariva Plain =

Coordinates: 10.34°N 61.13°W

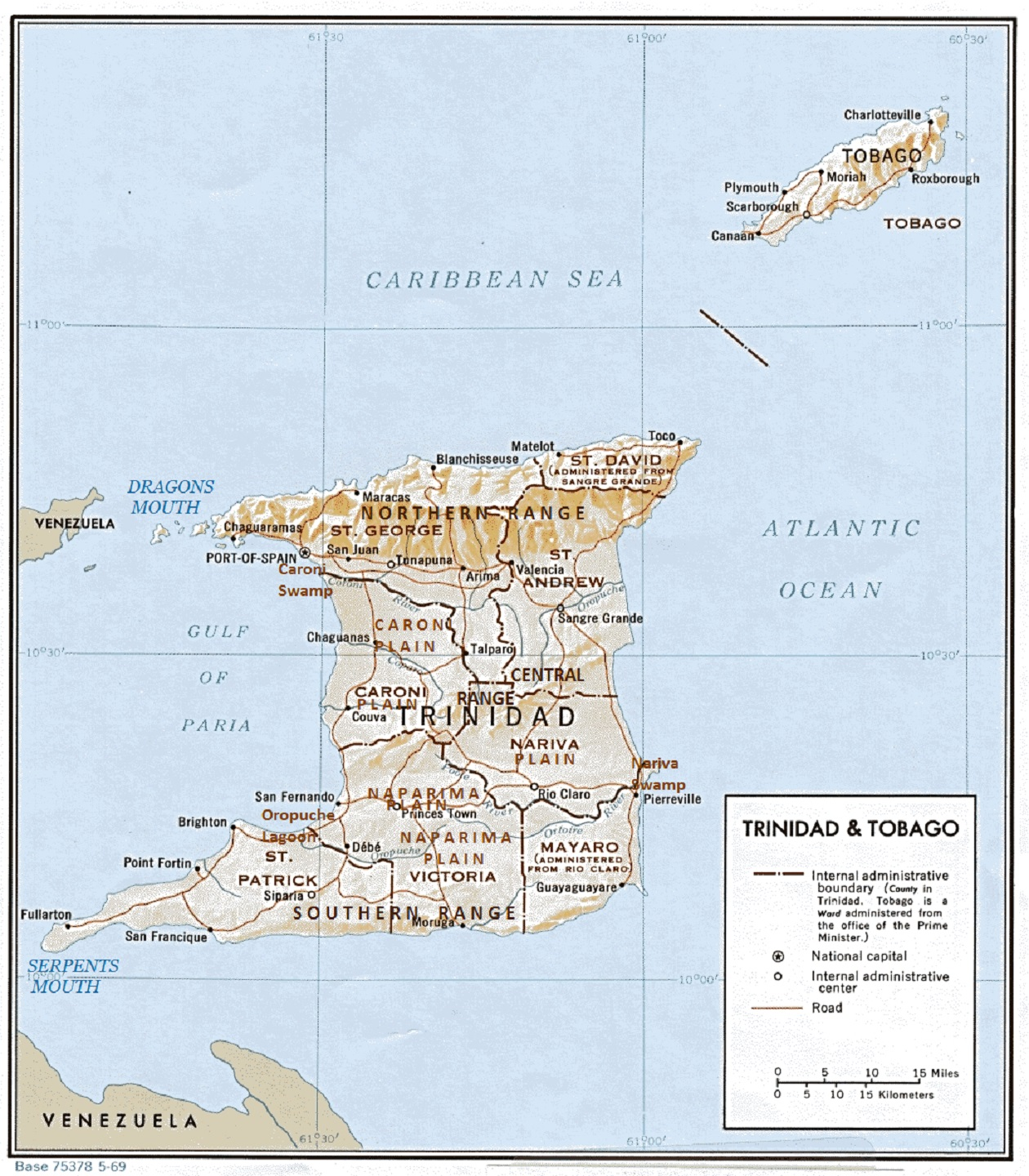
A physical relief map of Trinidad showing the Nariva Plain in the southeast

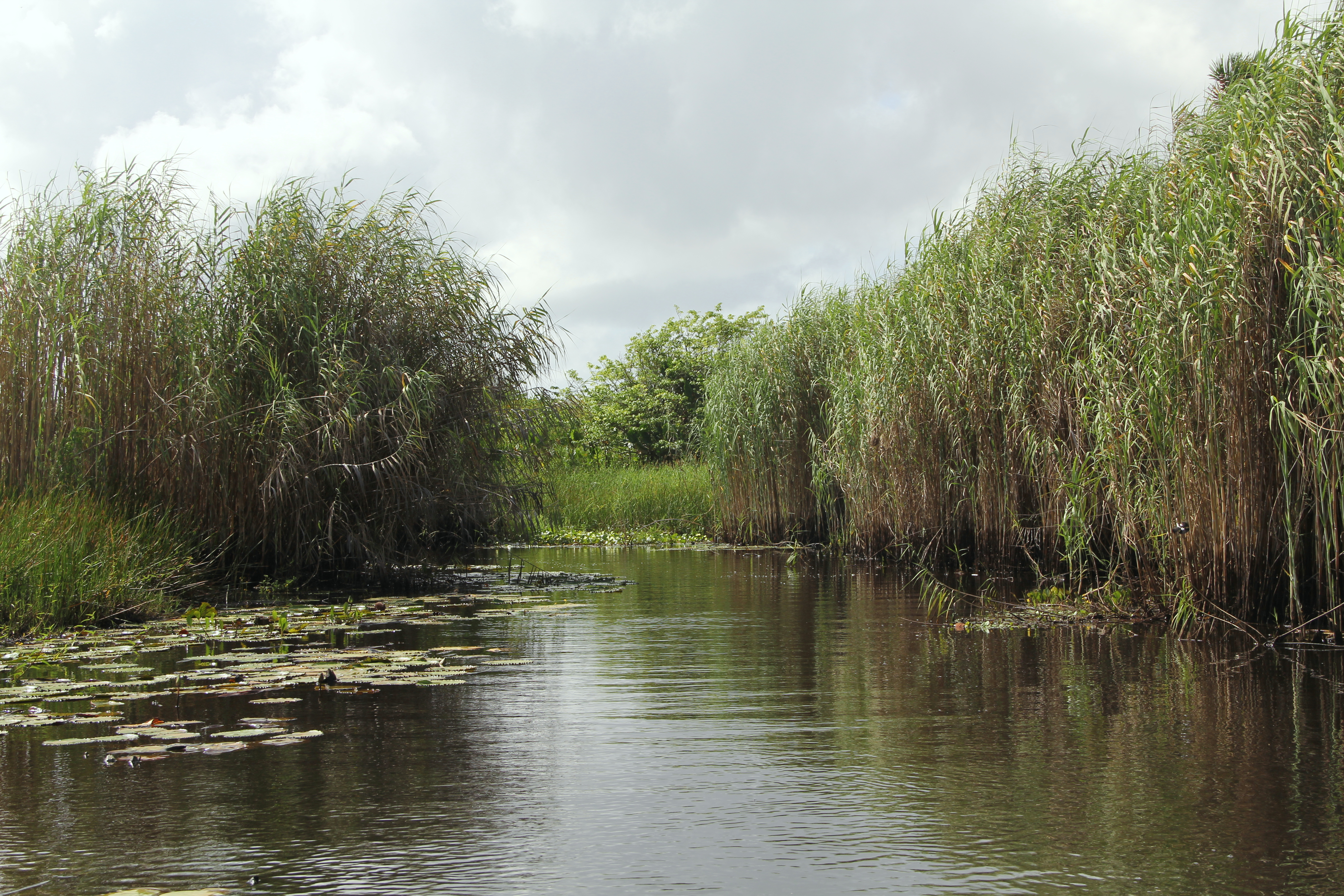
The Nariva Swamp on the mouth of the Ortoire River in Trinidad

On the island of Trinidad, the Nariva Plain is a lowland area on the east between the Central Range and the Southern Range; the lowland area on the west is the Naparima Plain. To the north of the Central Range is the Caroni Plain. The lowland areas are either flat or consist of gently rolling hills. The eastern half of the island is not as thickly settled as the western. The 35-mile long Ortoire River flows eastward through the Nariva Plain and drains in the Nariva Swamp (see map and picture below) on the Atlantic Ocean coast.
