= Caroni River =

Caroni River may refer to:

- Caroní River (Venezuela), one of the largest rivers of the Orinoco basin
- Caroni River (Trinidad and Tobago), the major river on the island of Trinidad
