= Caroni River (Trinidad and Tobago) =

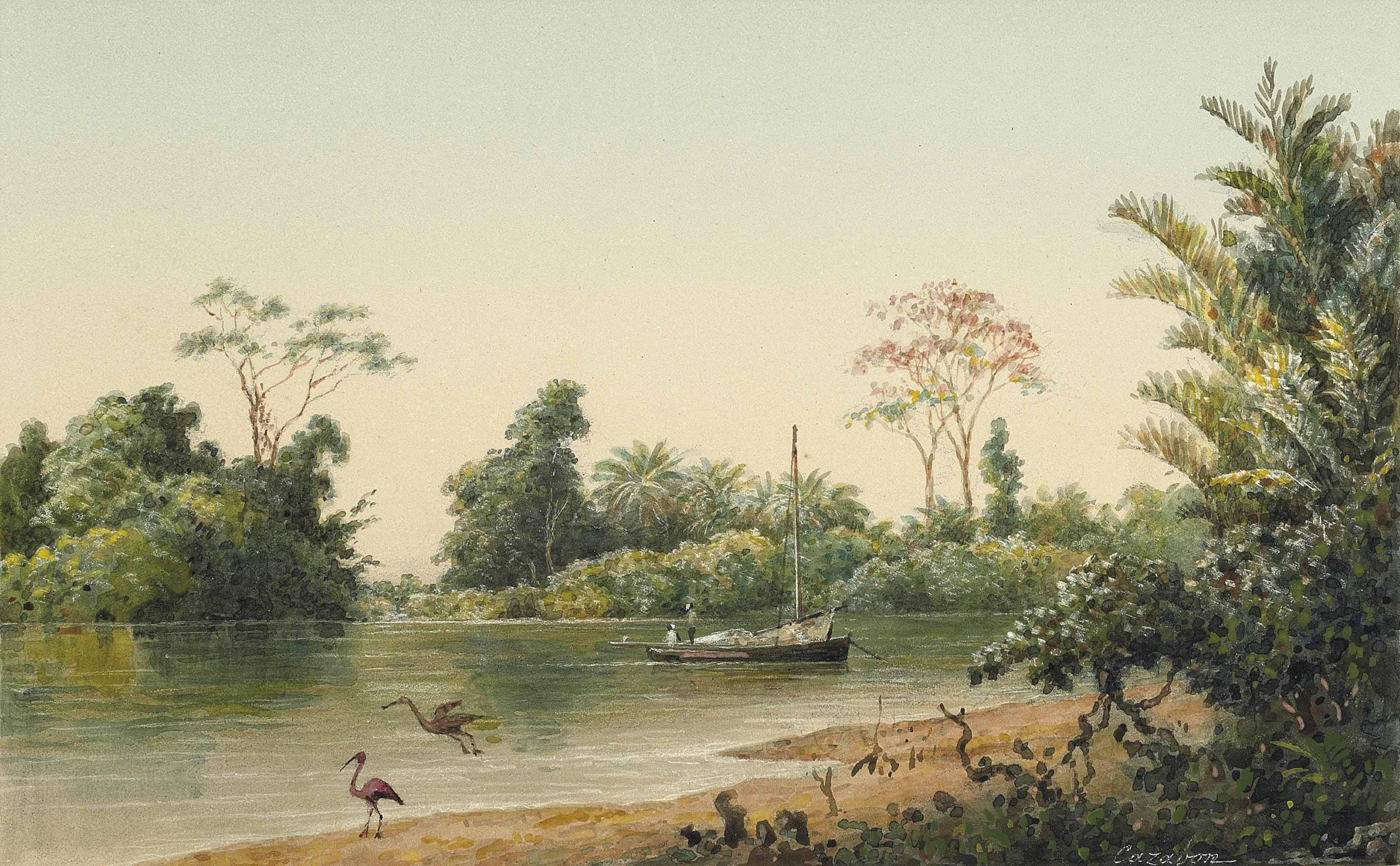

- Location of mouth

Location
- Country: Trinidad and Tobago

Physical characteristics
- Mouth
  - coordinates: 10°37′N 61°30′W

The Caroni River is the largest river in Trinidad and Tobago, running for 40 km (25 mi) from its origins in the Northern Range on the island of Trinidad, through the northern lowlands of the Caroni Plains and enters the Gulf of Paria at the Caroni Swamp.

The Caroni and its tributaries drain into one of the most densely populated parts of Trinidad, the East–West Corridor, and also provides most of its drinking water through the Caroni–Arena Dam. Point and non-point pollution is thus a major concern, as is the deforestation of its watershed on the southern slopes of the Northern Range. The banks of the Caroni River are one of the two main sites for Hindu cremations.

The River is known to have strong currents and occasionally floods during heavy rainfall, devastating crops, livestock, fields, and farms in the Caroni area.

== Course ==
The Caroni River originates as the Aripo River in the Northern Range and drains west into the mangrove wetlands of the Caroni Swamp.

=== Major tributaries ===
Twelve tributaries join the Caroni River from the Northern Range: the San Juan River, the Saint Joseph River, the Tunapuna River, the Tacarigua River, the Arouca River, the Oropuna River, the Mausica River, the Carapo River, the Arima River, the Guanapo River, El Mamo River, and the Aripo River. A further six tributaries drain the Central Range: the Tumpuna River, the Talparo River, the Cumuto River, the Guatapajaro River and two rivers which bear the name Arena.

== Catchment basin ==
The catchment basin of the Caroni River covers about 600 square kilometres (230 sq mi) in north Trinidad and occupies three of the five major physiographic units that make up the island of Trinidad: the Northern Range, the Northern Basin (or Caroni Plain), and the Central Range. The wider Caroni River basin, which includes the Caroni River and other smaller rivers that drain into the Caroni Swamp, covers 22% of the land area of the island of Trinidad.

== History ==
A shell midden along the San Juan River provides the oldest evidence of human habitation within the drainage basin of the Caroni River. These first Trinidadians belonged to the Ortoiroid people, who were hunters and gatherers. Remains associated with the Saladoid people, a later cultural group of agriculturalists, are known from along the Tumpuna River in the Central Range, in the Maracas Valley, in Tacarigua just east of the Tacarigua River, and in the town of St. Joseph, the first capital of Trinidad under Spanish rule.

In 1592 a Spanish official, Domingo de Vera, took possession of Trinidad on behalf of Antonio de Berrío y Oruña and established the town of San José de Oruña (modern St. Joseph) on the banks of the St. Joseph River. Berrío came to Trinidad in 1593 and used it as a base for exploring the mainland of South America while trying to prevent the establishment of English privateers and traders on the island.

== See also ==
- List of rivers in Trinidad and Tobago
