= Caroni Swamp =

Largest mangrove wetland in Trinidad and Tobago

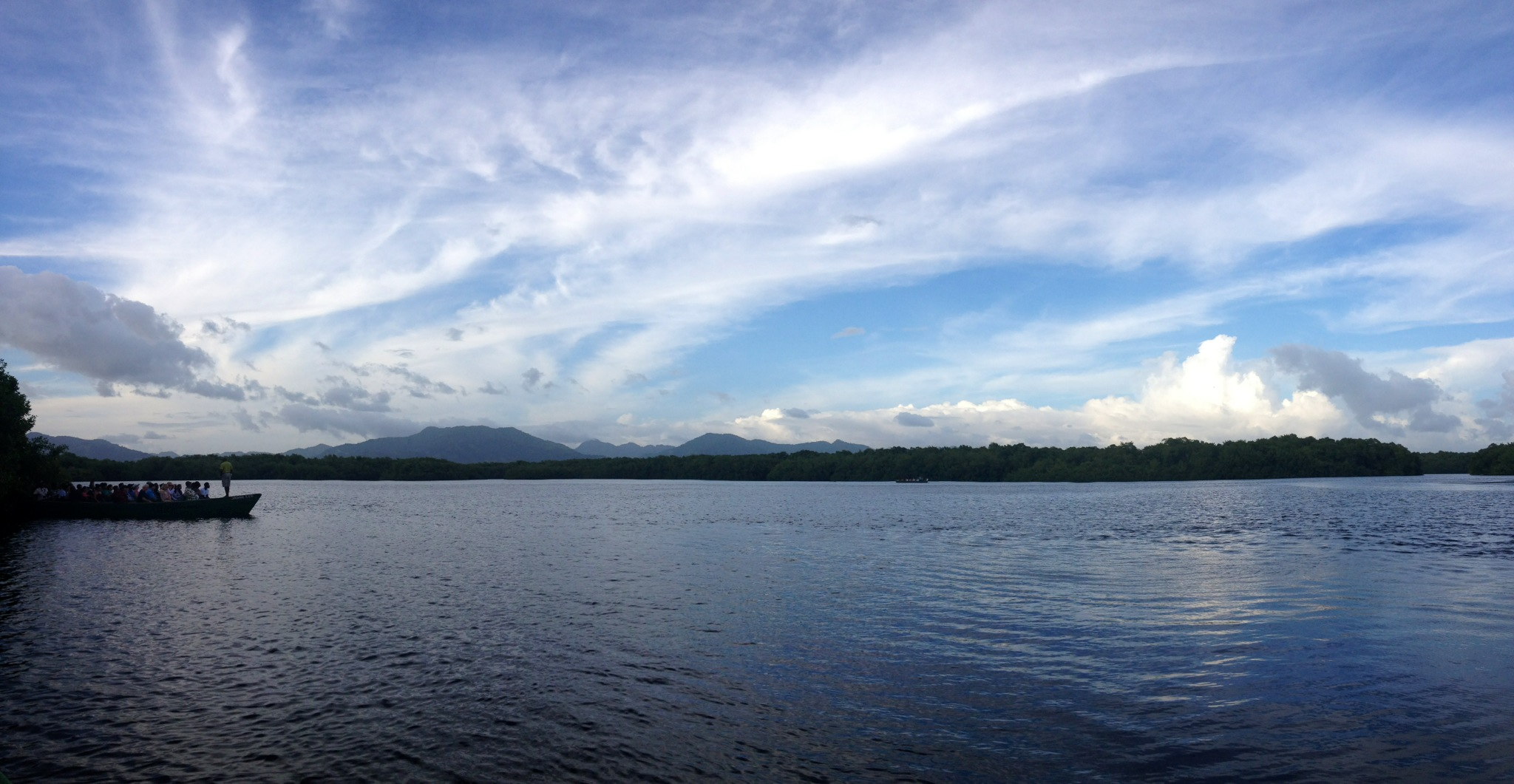
- Panoramic view of Caroni Swamp, with Trinidad’s northern range in the background.

- Location within Trinidad and Tobago

Geography
- Location: San Juan-Laventille, Trinidad and Tobago, Trinidad and Tobago
- Coordinates: 10.5914°N 61.4553°W
- Area: 56.1 km^{2} (21.7 sq mi)

Administration
- Status: Protected
- Administrator: Ramsar Convention

Ecology
- Ecosystem: Mangrove forest
- Dominant tree species: Mangrove trees

Ramsar Wetland
- Official name: Caroni Swamp
- Designated: 8 July 2005
- Reference no.: 1497

The Caroni Swamp is the largest mangrove forest and the second largest wetland in Trinidad and Tobago. It is located on the west coast of Trinidad, south of Port of Spain and northwest of Chaguanas, where the Caroni River meets the Gulf of Paria.

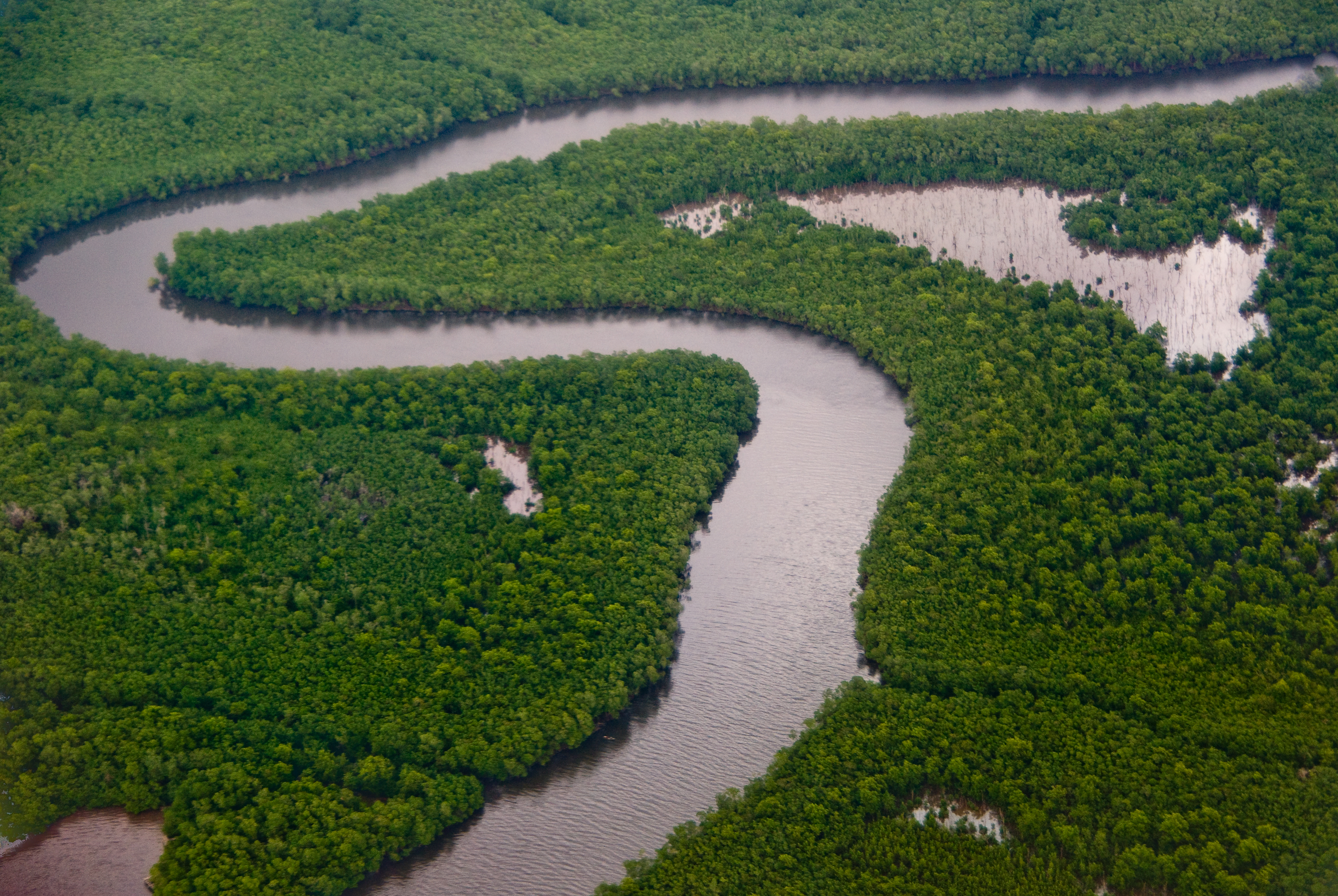
View of the Caroni Swamp from above, showing a river and mangrove trees.

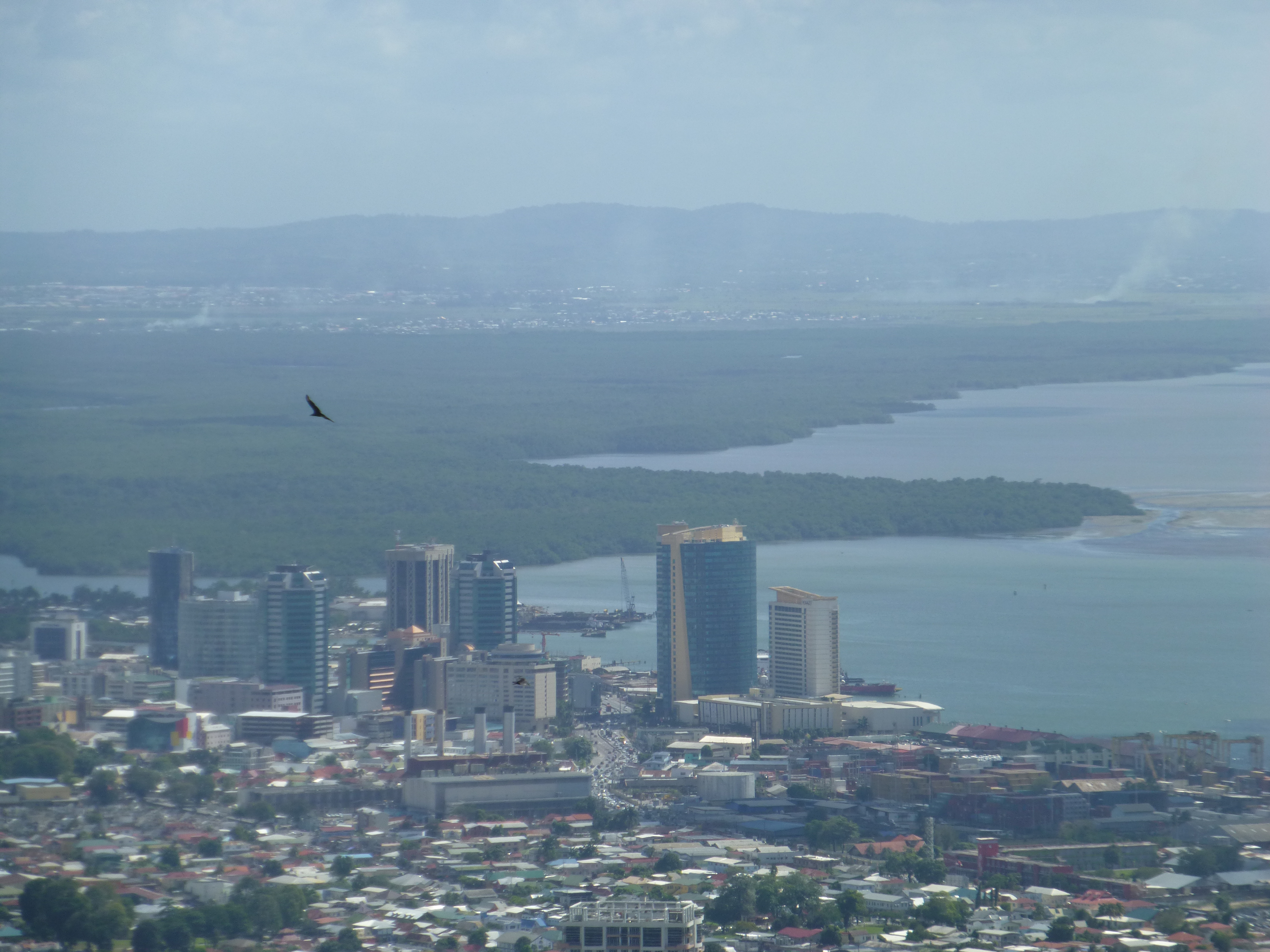
View of the Caroni Swamp from a hill, with Port of Spain in the foreground.

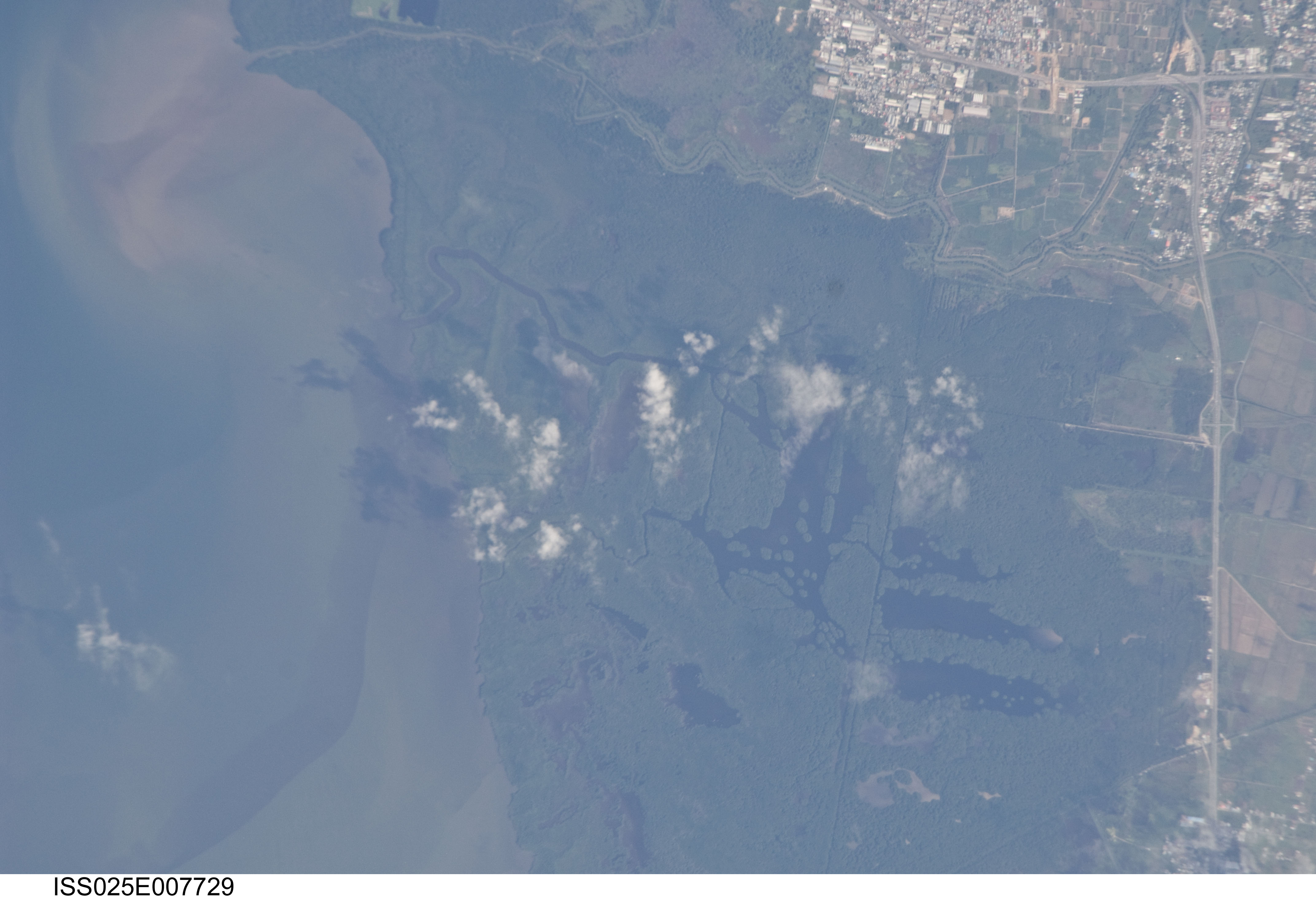
Caroni Swamp from the International Space Station

The Caroni Swamp is an estuarine system comprising 5,611 hectares of mangrove forest and herbaceous marsh, interrupted by numerous channels, and brackish and saline lagoons, and with extensive intertidal mudflats on the seaward side. The swamp is an important wetland since it is ecologically diverse, consisting of marshes, mangrove trees, and tidal mudflats in close proximity. The wetland provides a variety of habitats for flora and faunal species, it's a productive system that provides food and protection, and is a nursery for marine and freshwater species.

== Description ==
The Caroni Swamp is a 12,000 acre swamp located on the west coast of the island of Trinidad, making it the largest mangrove forest on the island. The Caroni Swamp is protected under the Ramsar Convention as a wetland of international importance. The Caroni Swamp runs along the banks of the Caroni River and contains numerous channels, brackish and saline lagoons with intertidal mudflats. The Caroni Swamp also contains fresh water and saltwater marshes and is also known as a bird sanctuary. The central section of the acreage is designated as a wildlife sanctuary and is a major home for one of Trinidad and Tobago's national birds, the scarlet ibis. The Caroni Swamp is the largest roosting place for the scarlet ibis and is also the home of over 100 avian species.

== Protected Area and Species ==
The Caroni Swamp is protected under the Ramsar Convention. The Ramsar Convention is the intergovernmental treaty that provides the framework for the conservation and wise use of wetlands and their resources. It all started during the 1960s when people became concerned about the increasing loss and the degradation of wetland habitat for migratory birds. The treaty was first adopted in the Iranian city of Ramsar in 1971. The Ramsar Convention is the oldest intergovernmental environmental agreements which came into force in 1975.

The Caroni Swamp has a total of 20 endangered species and is ecologically diverse. It provides a variety of habitats for flora and fauna. Caroni Swamp supports a rich biodiversity. It is a productive area of wetland that provides food (organic production) and also provides protection. It is also a nursery for marine and freshwater species. The Caroni Swamp is important economically and is a popular site for ecotourism.

=== Important Bird Area ===
The swamp has been designated an Important Bird Area (IBA) by BirdLife International because it supports a significant population of scarlet ibis as well as other waterbirds. It is also important for silky anteaters and crab-eating raccoons.

== Educational Usage / Eco-tourism ==
The Caroni Swamp is visited by thousands of nationals and eco-tourists per year, and is important to local communities. The Caroni Swamp is not only an attraction for tourism but it also provides goods and services to local communities and to the island of Trinidad. For example, the swamp provides coastal storm surge protection, carbon sequestration (the uptake and storage of carbon by trees and plants that absorb carbon dioxide), and sediment filtration for near-shore ecosystems.

In 2011 a project was started in order to evaluate the TEV, total economic value, of the Caroni Swamp. The study looks at the way the Caroni Swamp provides for Trinidad and Tobago and to the wider Caribbean. The study also predicts the potential damage that climate change can have on wetlands and ecosystems such as the Caroni Swamp. This study may provide strategies for preventing damage to other wetlands as well.

== Scarlet ibis ==
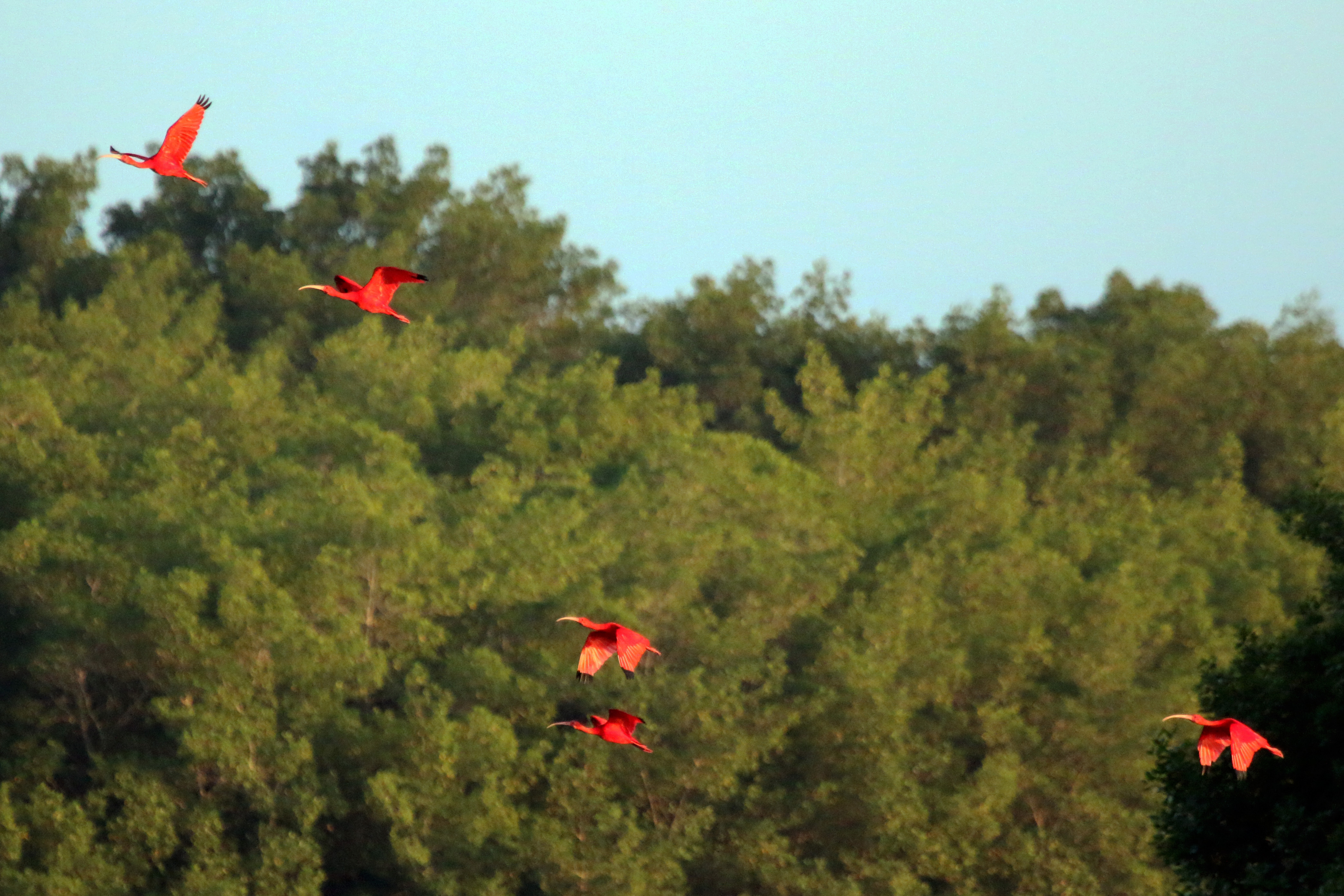
Scarlet ibis flying in the Caroni Swamp to roost in its mangrove trees

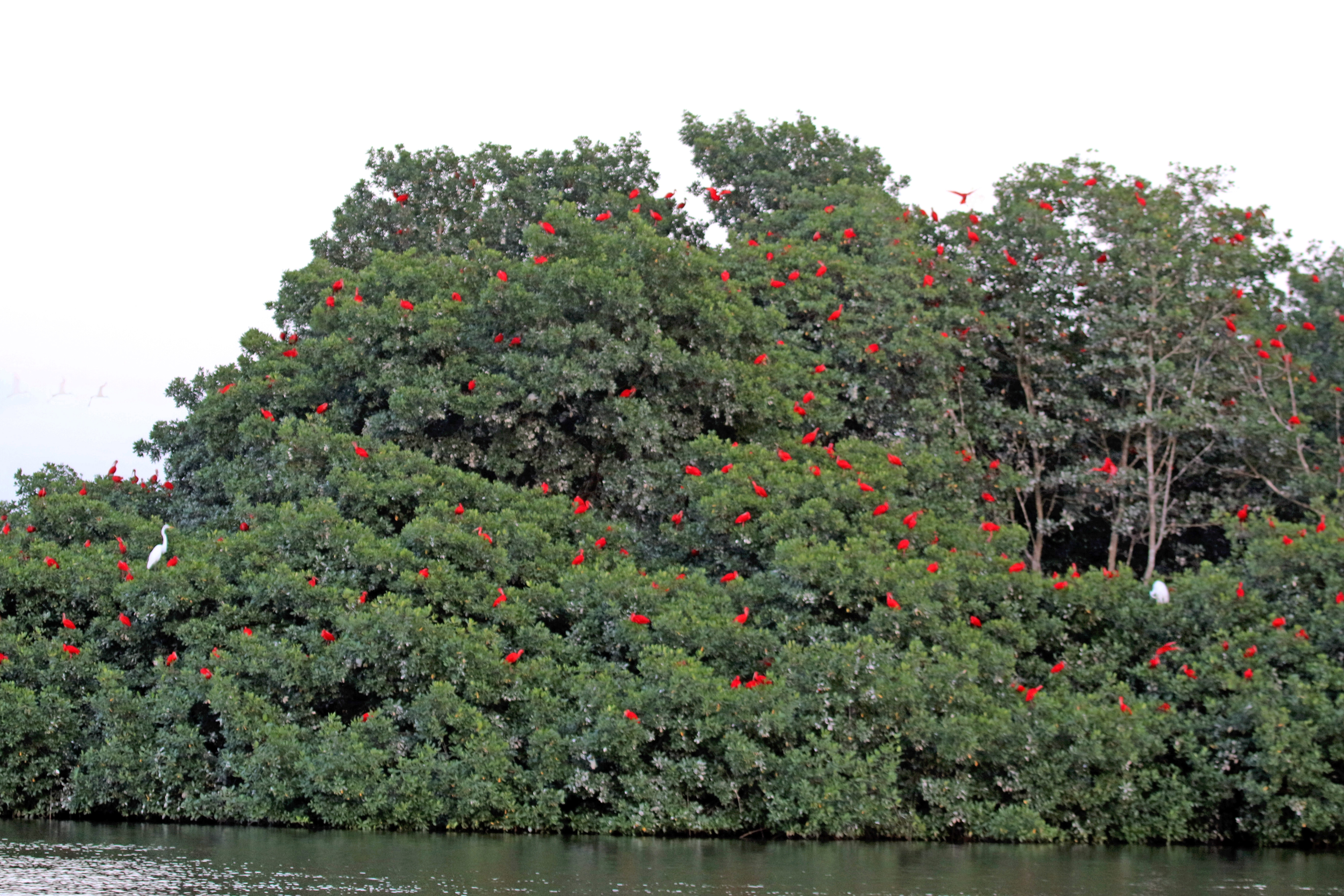
Many scarlet ibis roosting in the mangrove trees of the swamp

The Caroni Swamp is a popular site for bird watching and is home to over 100 bird species. In 1962 when Trinidad and Tobago gained independence from the United Kingdom, the scarlet ibis was chosen as the national bird of Trinidad. The scarlet ibis then gained protection and could no longer be hunted.

The scarlet ibis travels to northeastern Venezuela every day from the Caroni Swamp and the distance between the swamp and the Venezuelan mainland is around 11 miles. During the evening, many scarlet ibis return to the swamp to roost in its mangrove trees. Watching scarlet ibis return from feeding on the mainland of Venezuela is the main attraction for many tourists and nationals, as their red feathers fill the sky as they return to the swamp.

The scarlet ibis’ bright red colour comes from the pigments from their food, as their diet consists of crustaceans, crabs, small fish, mollusks, worms, and insects. The scarlet ibis is protected in Trinidad and Tobago but is at risk from poaching and pollution of the swamp.

== Caroni Bird Sanctuary Tours ==
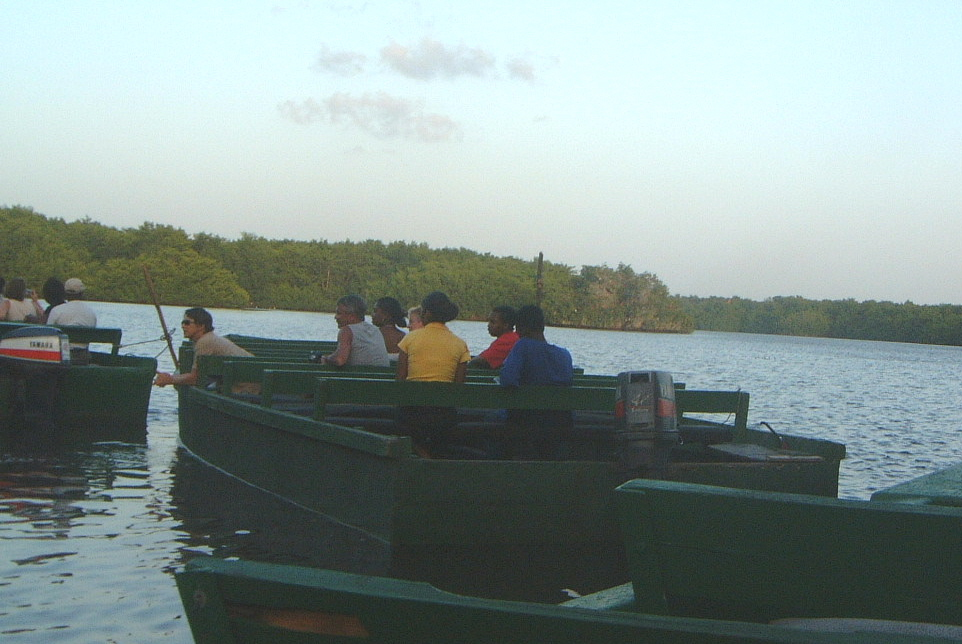
Many people ride on boats to travel across the Caroni Swamp on rivers.

The Nanan's Bird Sanctuary Tours started in the 1930s and is named after Winston Nanan. Winston Nanan of Trinidad, was an acknowledged expert on the flora and fauna of the Caroni Swamp Bird Sanctuary. He helped get a petition signed along with his father, Simon Oudit Nanan, to make the Swamp a bird sanctuary. Nanan's Caroni Bird Sanctuary tours conduct lectured boat tours daily into the Caroni Swamp by trained guides. The tours include specialized bird watching tours, fishing tours, water sampling trips, educational and research trips, photography and filming trips, and also destination weddings at the Caroni Swamp.

== Caroni Swamp Today ==
The Caroni Swamp is a popular destination in Trinidad, as many nationals and tourists take Nanan's tour guides to the swamp. Climate change and pollution to the swamp is becoming a main concern as Trinidad and Tobago tries to conserve the Caroni Swamp. Illegal hunting and harvesting of oysters as well as harvesting of mangrove bark may be few of the problems for the Caroni Swamp. The government of Trinidad is trying to keep the Swamp conserved knowing that it not only provides for the flora and fauna but for humans as well.

== Wildlife highlights ==
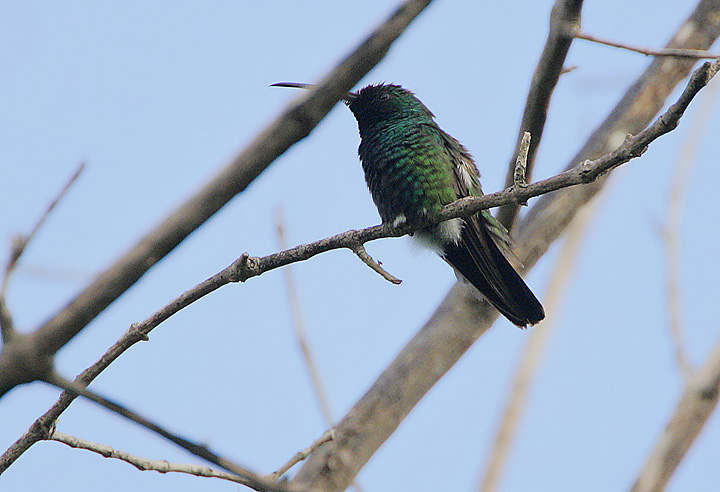
A male green-throated mango hummingbird on a branch, commonly found in mangrove swamps

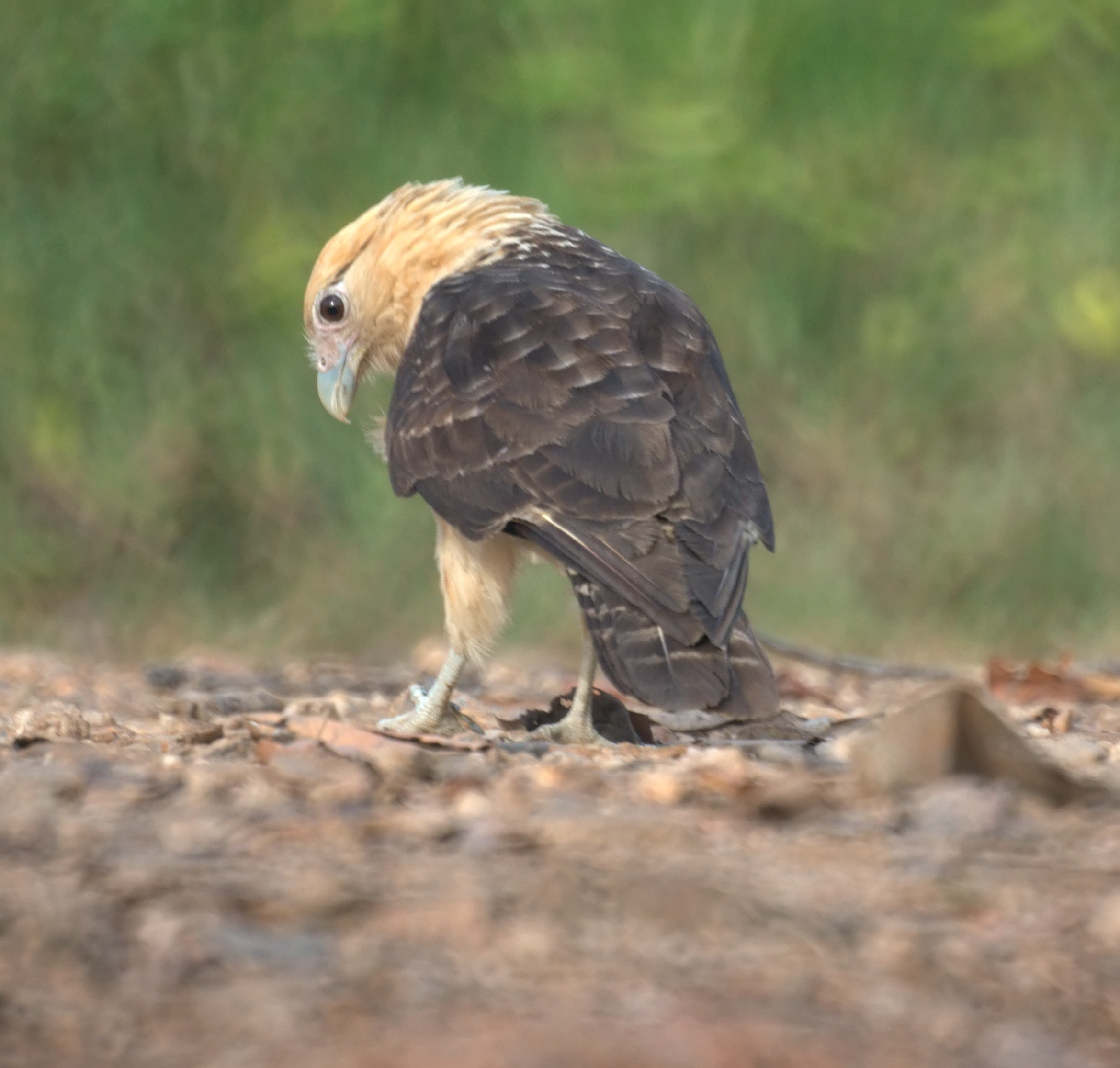
A Yellow-headed caracara

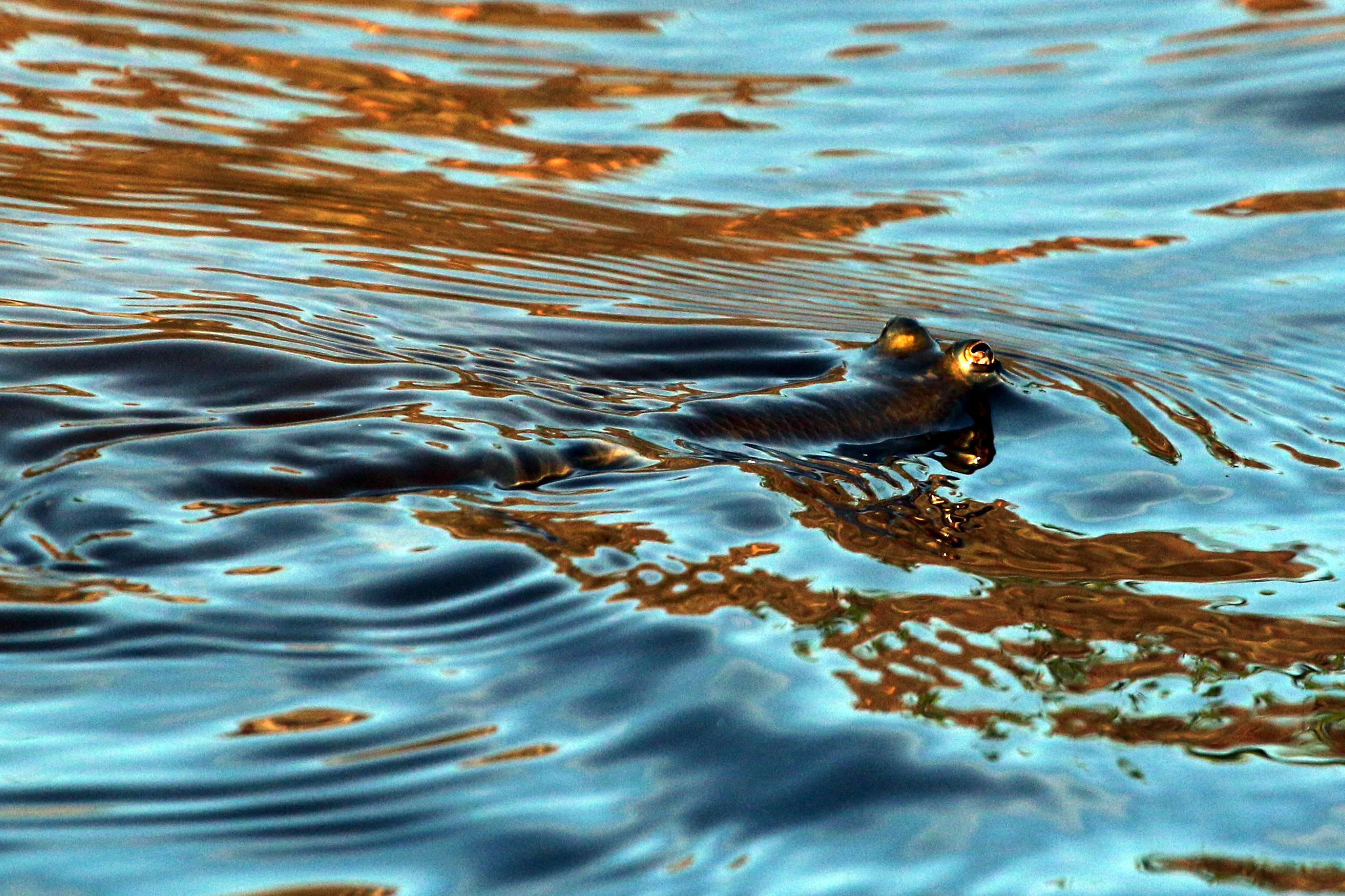
A four-eyed fish (Anableps anableps) in the waters of the Caroni Swamp

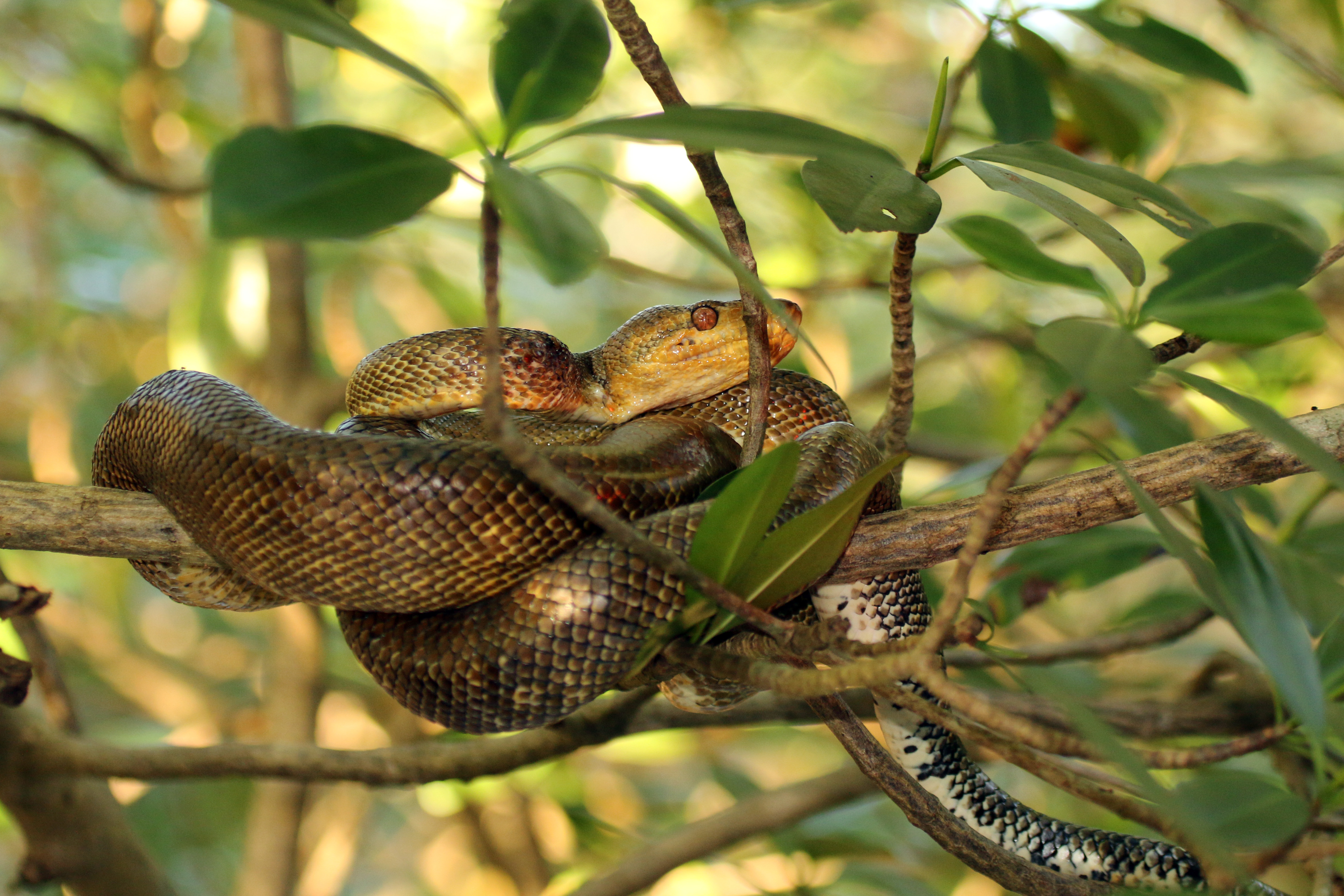
A Trinidad tree boa seen resting on a branch in the Caroni Swamp

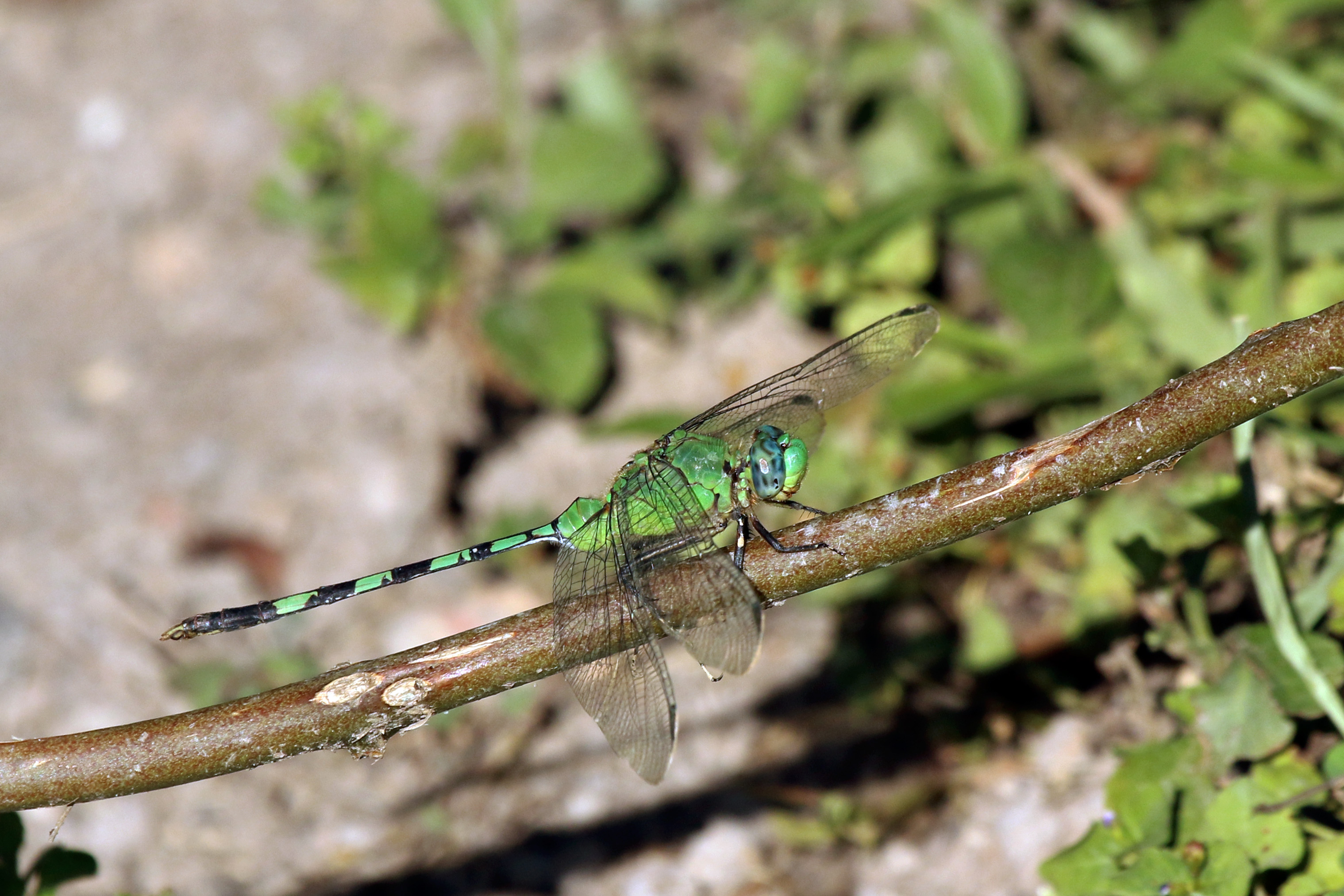
A male great pondhawk dragonfly on a branch
