= Moruga =

- Village
- Location in Trinidad and Tobago
- Coordinates: 10°5′18″N 61°16′49″W
- Country: Trinidad and Tobago
- Region: Princes Town

The village of Moruga lies on the central south coast of Trinidad at the western end of the Trinity Hills. It is in Princes Town region and is served by the Princes Town Regional Corporation.

The village is close to Trinidad's oil reserves, and that and fishing are the area's main economies with some of the residents of the community working in the region's capital Princes Town and San Fernando. It is somewhat of a rural dormitory district for these larger urban areas.

Moruga was in the national news in 1998 when a historic bridge near the town collapsed as a van was being driven over it (there were no fatalities).

The main communities within the Moruga district (heading south from Princes Town) are Indian Walk, Fifth Company, Preau (St Mary's), Cachipe, Rock River, Basse Terre, Bois Jean Jean, Grand Chemin, La Lune and Marac, with the last three communities located on the coast. Basse Terre has the largest population and Grand Chemin is the location of the major government buildings such as the local police station, library and public health facility. Moruga Proper hosts the Moruga museum, a small museum depicting the history of Moruga and Trinidad.

Moruga is said to be the place where Christopher Columbus landed when he discovered Trinidad.

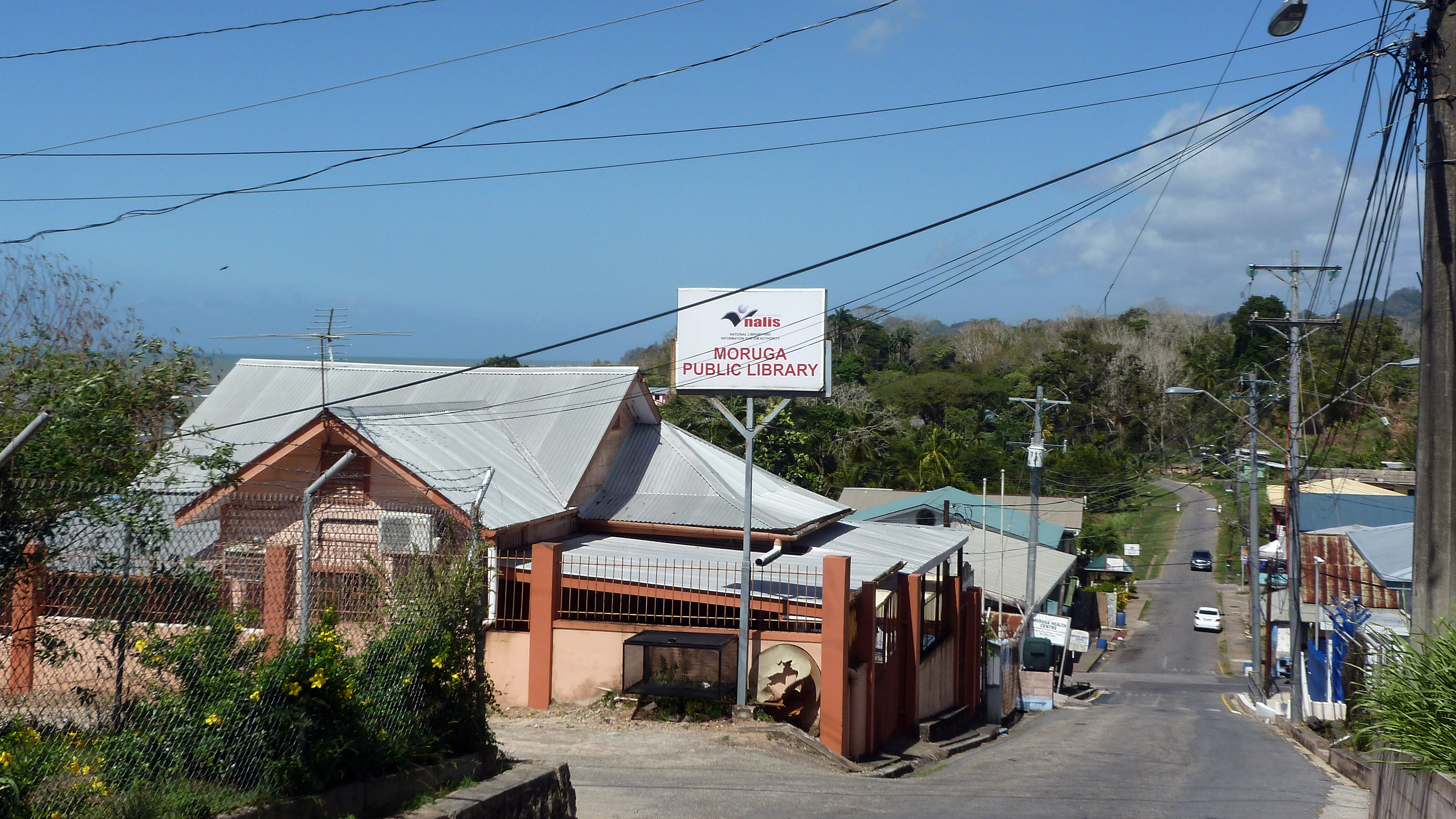
Moruga - Village on the south coast of Trinidad, West Indies. Main occupations are agriculture and fishing. The well-known Moruga Scorpion hot pepper, one of the hottest pepper varieties, takes its name from the area.

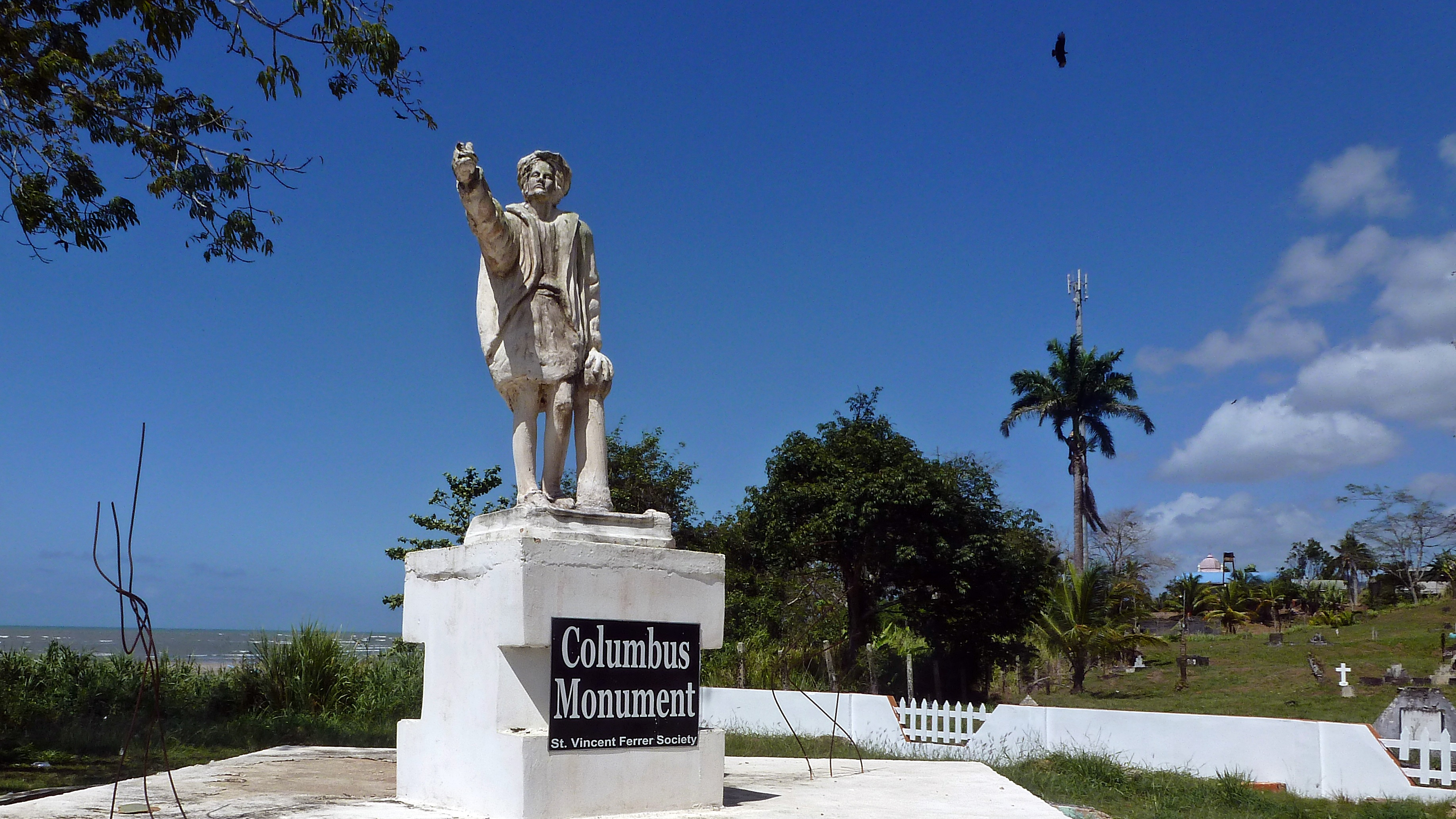
Moruga - Christopher Columbus monument. Columbus landed here on his third voyage in 1498. This is on the southern coast of the island of Trinidad, West Indies

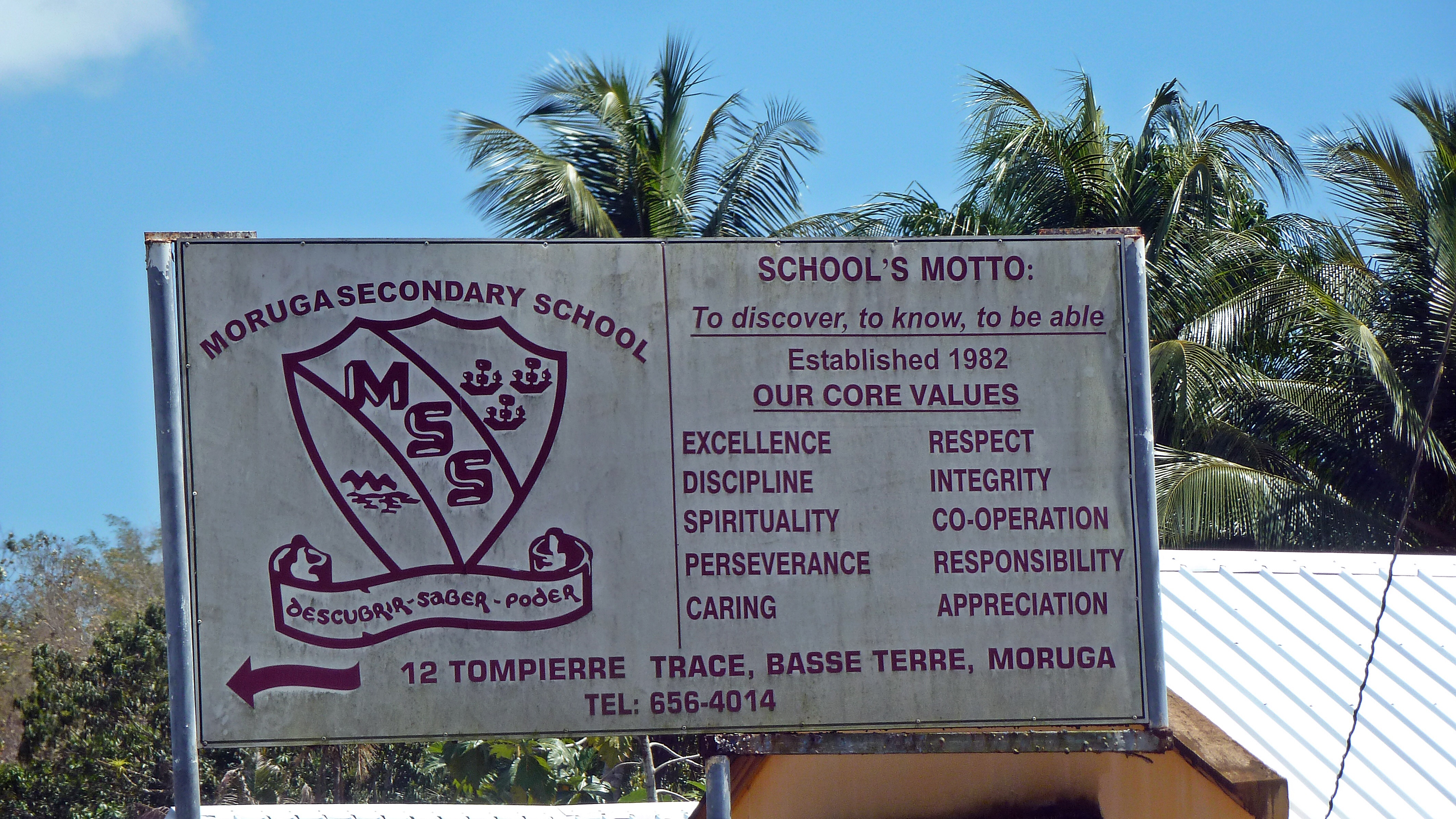
Moruga - Secondary school

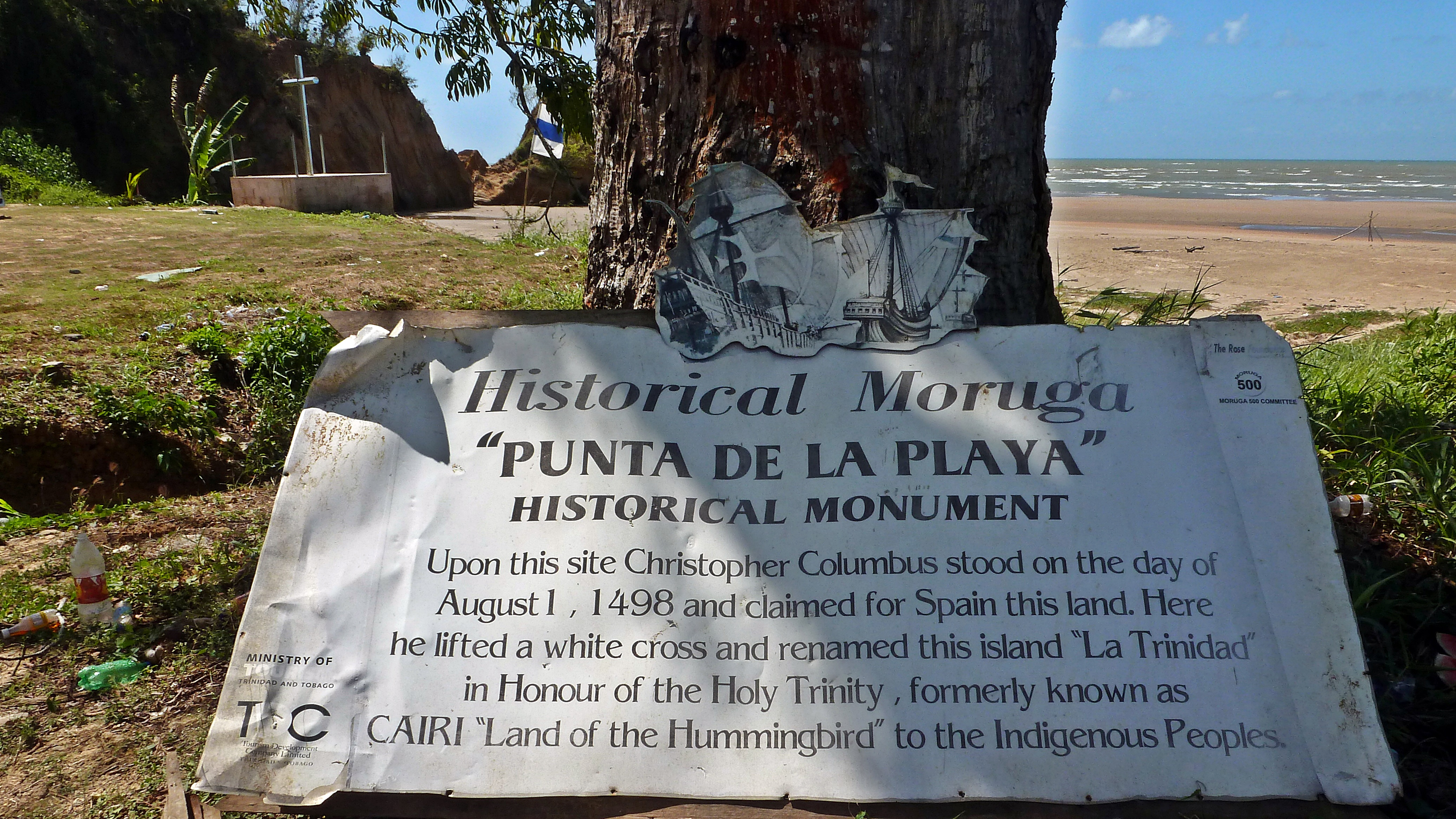
Moruga - Columbus historical monument. Columbus landed here on his third voyage in 1498. This is on the southern coast of the island of Trinidad, West Indies. the sea in the background is named the Columbus channel. it separates the island of Trinidad from Venezuela

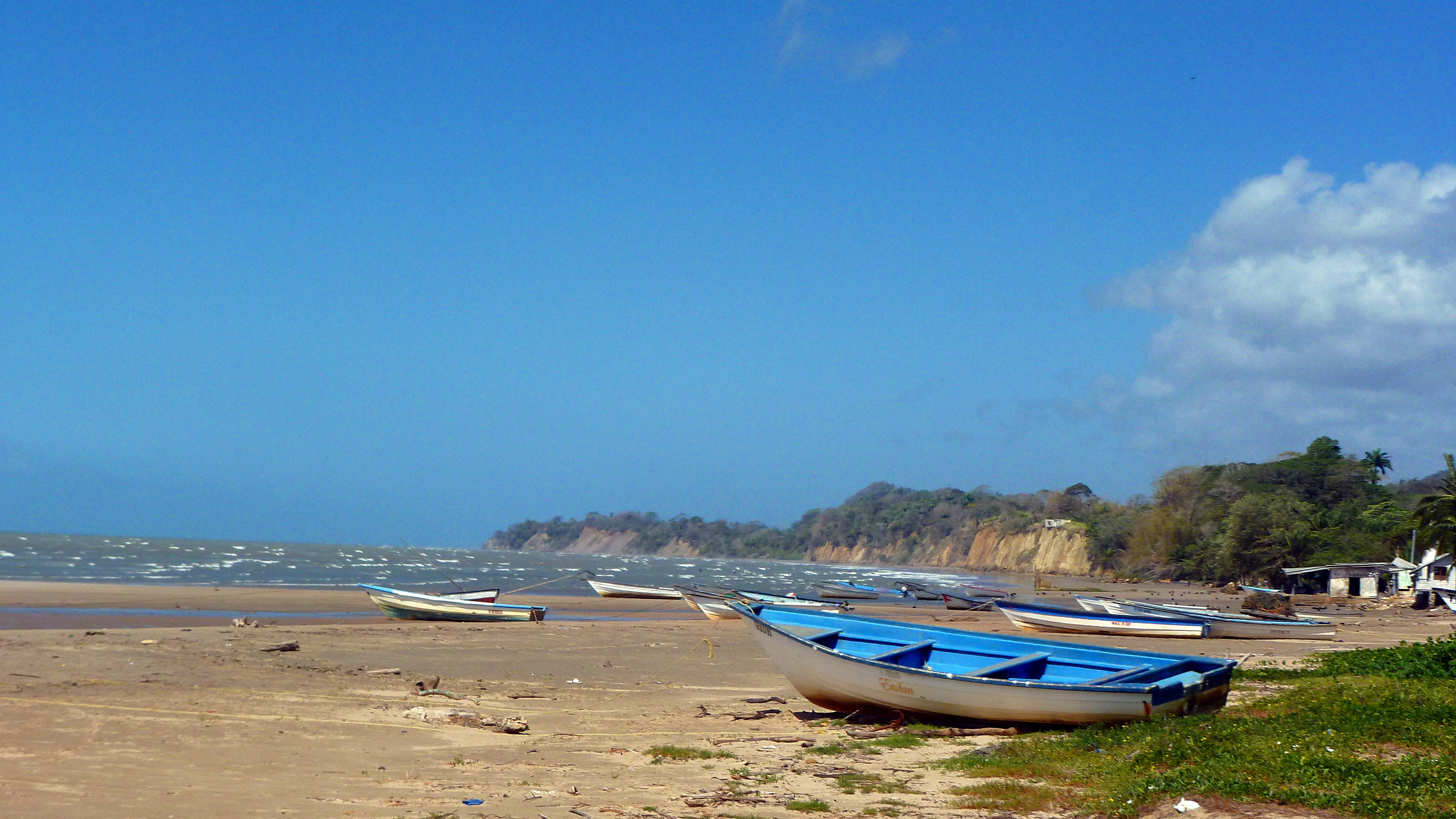
Moruga coastline - Columbus Channel

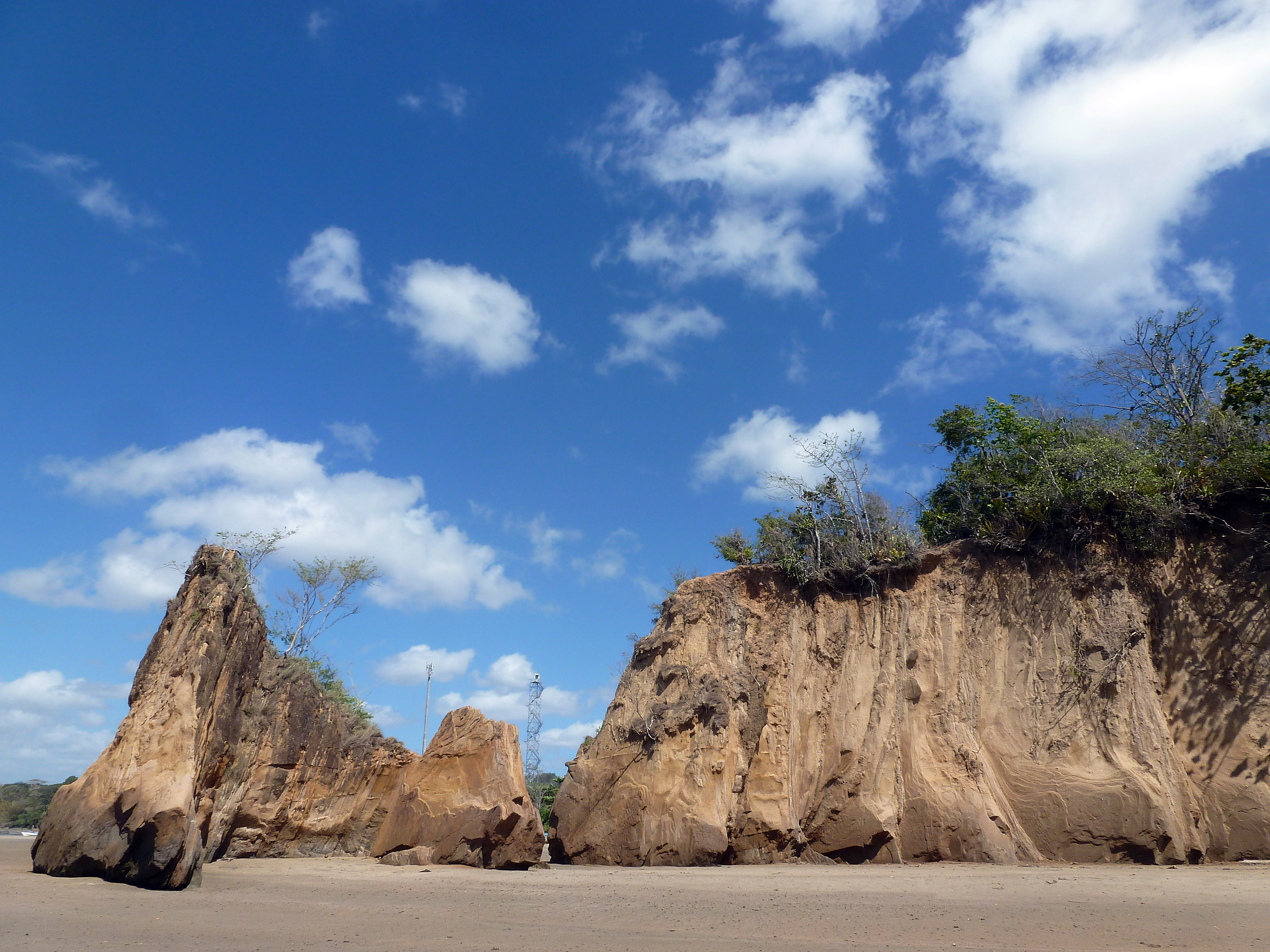
Moruga coastline. The south coast of the island of Trinidad is subject to severe coastal erosion. The soft sandstone rocks are constantly battered by rough seas. Stacks, arches, sand spits and lagoons are common coastal features along this coastline.
