= Naparima Plain =

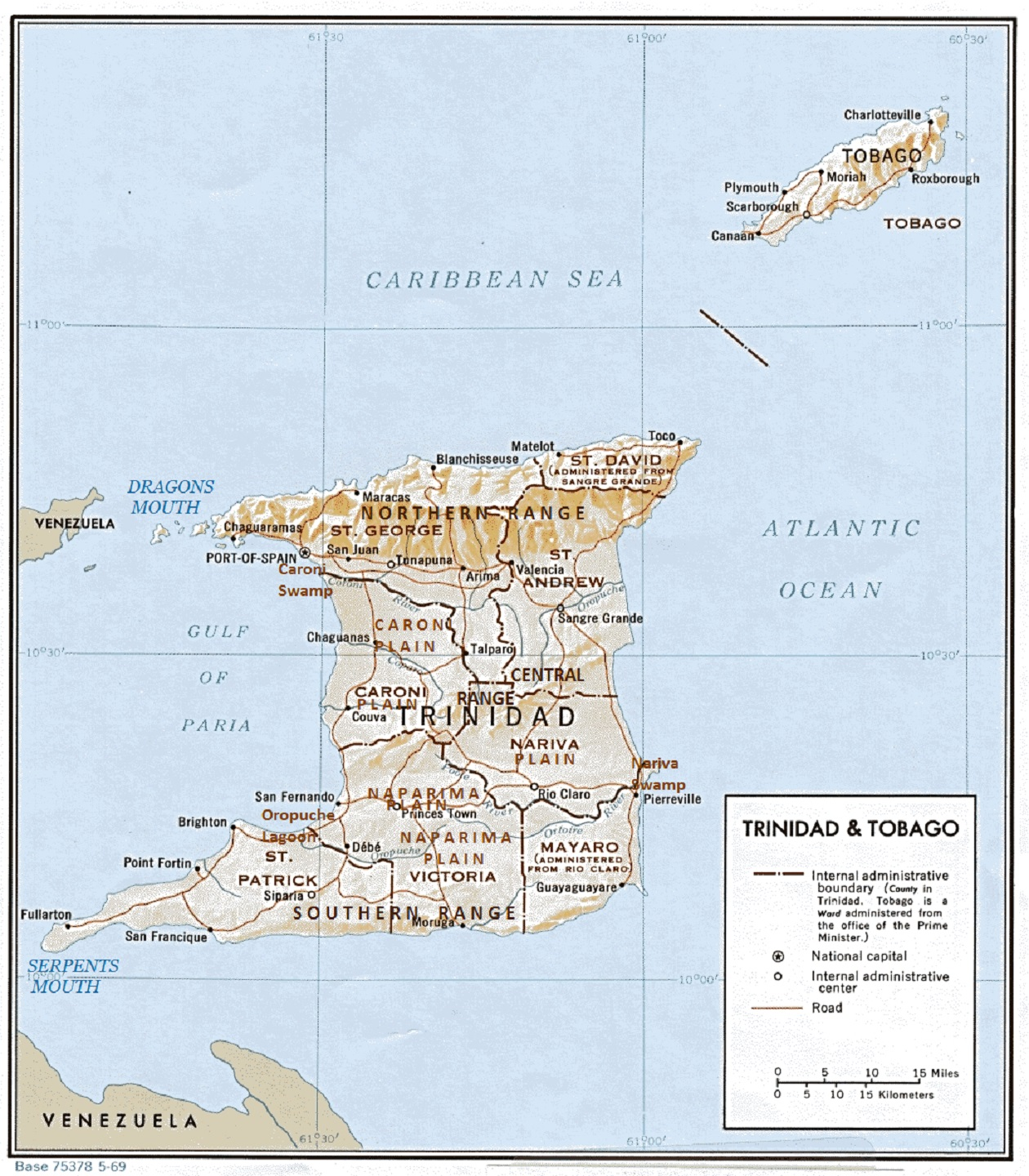
A physical relief map of Trinidad showing the Naparima Plain in the southwest

On the island of Trinidad, the Naparima Plain is a broad lowland area on the west between the Central Range and the Southern Range (see map); the lowland area on the east is the Nariva Plain. To the north of the Central Range is the Caroni Plain. The Oropouche river flows through the Naparima Plain and drains into the Oropouche Lagoon, a swampy area, on the Gulf of Paria coast. The northern region of the Naparima Plain has alluvial soil; the southern region is sandy and less fertile.

The Banwari Trace archaeological site, the oldest site in the Caribbean, is located in the Naparima Plains (Oropouche River plains).
