= Northern Range =

Trinidad and Tobago mountain range

Coordinates: 10°44′N 61°15′W

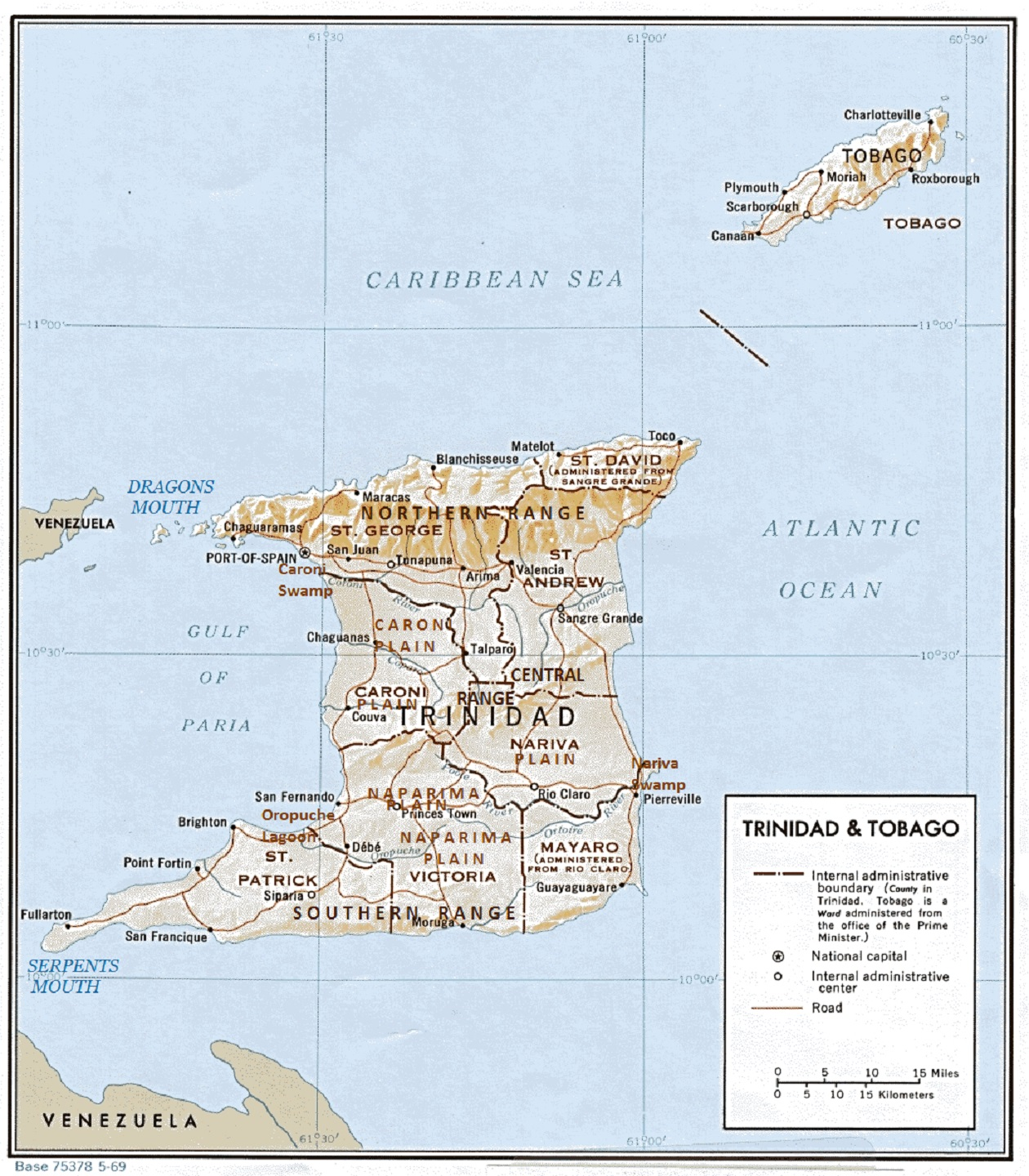
A shaded relief map of Trinidad showing the Northern Range

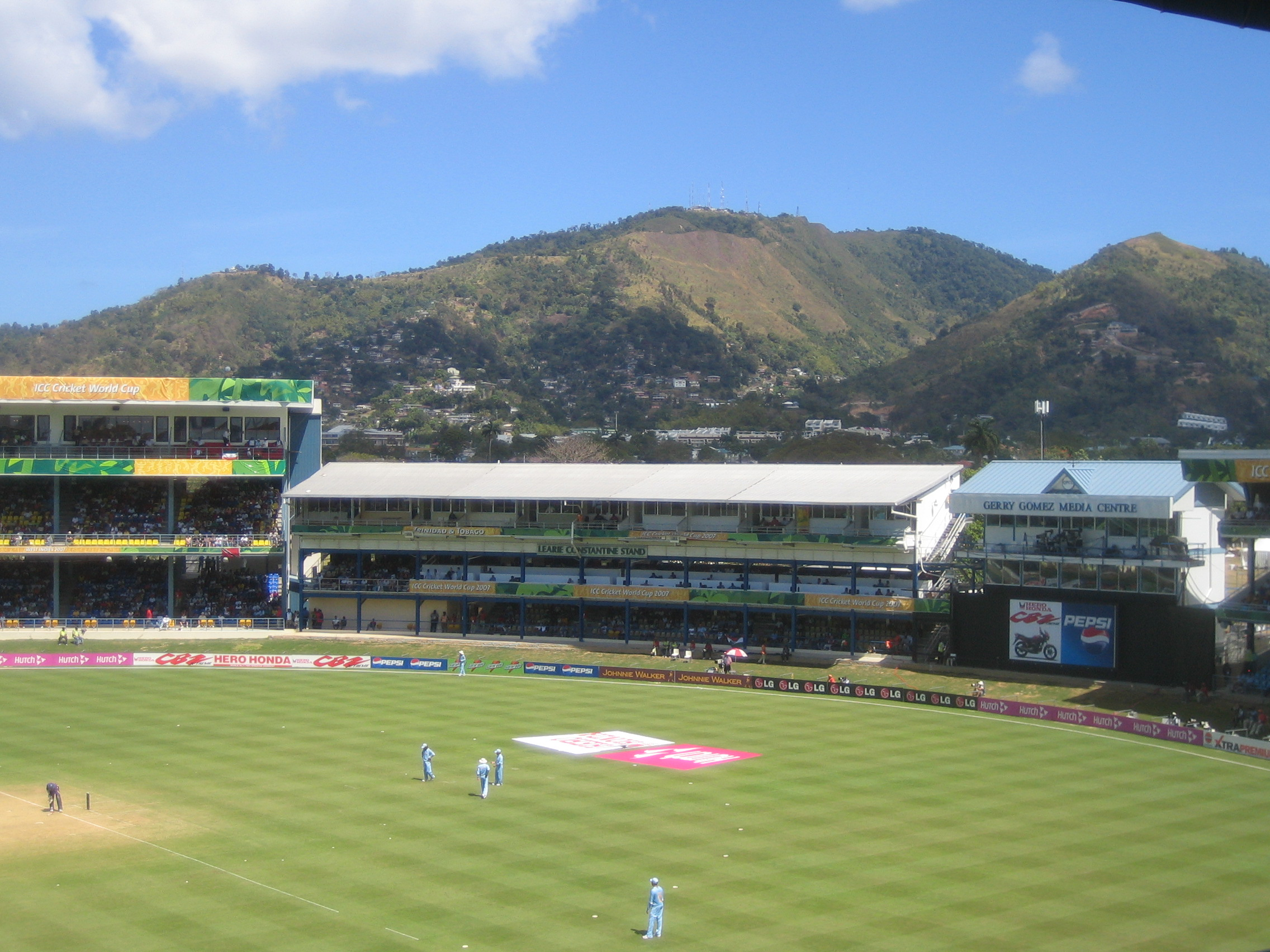
The hills of the Northern Range rising behind the Queen's Park Oval in Trinidad.

The Northern Range is the range of tall hills across north Trinidad, the major island in the Republic of Trinidad and Tobago. The hills range from the Chaguaramas peninsula on the west coast to Toco in the east. The Northern Range covers approximately twenty-five percent of the land area of Trinidad.

== Geography ==
The Northern Range runs from the Chaguaramas Peninsula in the west to Toco in the east. The eastern Northern Range (areas east of Arima) remain most heavily forested. Portions west of Arima, especially the southern slopes and valleys, have been extensively deforested, since they lie immediately north of the most heavily populated parts of the island.

At the western end of the Northern Range, the capital city, Port of Spain, climbs into the hills and the valleys are settled and largely deforested.

The Arima Valley remains as the westernmost valley that is still primarily forested, in a large part due to the presence of the Asa Wright Nature Centre in this valley.

The hills rise abruptly from the lowlands of northern Trinidad (the so-called East–West Corridor), but only the two tallest peaks, El Cerro del Aripo and El Tucuche top 900 m. The south-facing valleys run deep into the hills and support major rivers, such as the Caroni River, while the north-facing valleys are generally short and are drained by smaller streams.

There are numerous streams and waterfalls in the Northern Range. The highest waterfall is Maracas waterfall, towering 91.5 metres (300 ft) high. Other waterfalls include the Rincon Falls, Rio Seco Falls and Marianne Falls.

== Geology ==
The Northern Range consists mainly of sedimentary rocks, schists and limestones; portions at the eastern end of the range are of volcanic origin.

The country's largest cave system, the Aripo Cave, is located in the Northern Range. The caves feature stalagmite and stalactite formations. These caves are inhabited by nocturnal oilbirds, and bats.

Numerous sulphur springs occur on the river beds of Rio Seco Falls, demonstrating the volcanic nature of the region.

== Ecology ==
The biodiversity within the Northern Range, which represents a combination of species from the South American continent and from the Caribbean islands further north is high. The densely forested peaks are home to over 100 species of mammals and 430 species of birds. Animals such as red howler monkeys, capuchin monkeys, neotropical river otters, collared peccary, ocelots and red brocket deer, to name a few, inhabit the lush forests, making the Northern Range the only mountain range in the Caribbean to host such species.

The hills are mostly forested, although deforestation and the formation of fire-savannahs is one of the major environmental concerns in Trinidad.

On the summits of El Cerro del Aripo and El Tucuche, the vegetation is quite different from the lower montane forests. Elfin woodland and cloud forests cover the summits, and are home to the near endemic El Tucuche golden tree frog.

== Gallery ==
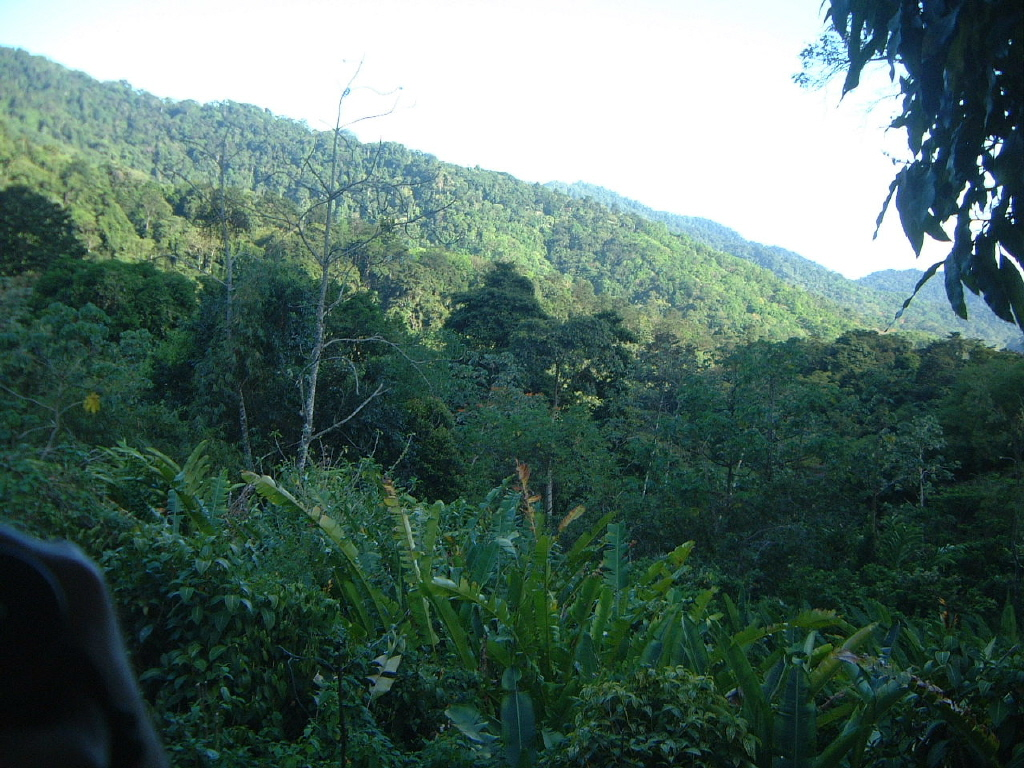
Northern Range from Asa Wright Nature Centre

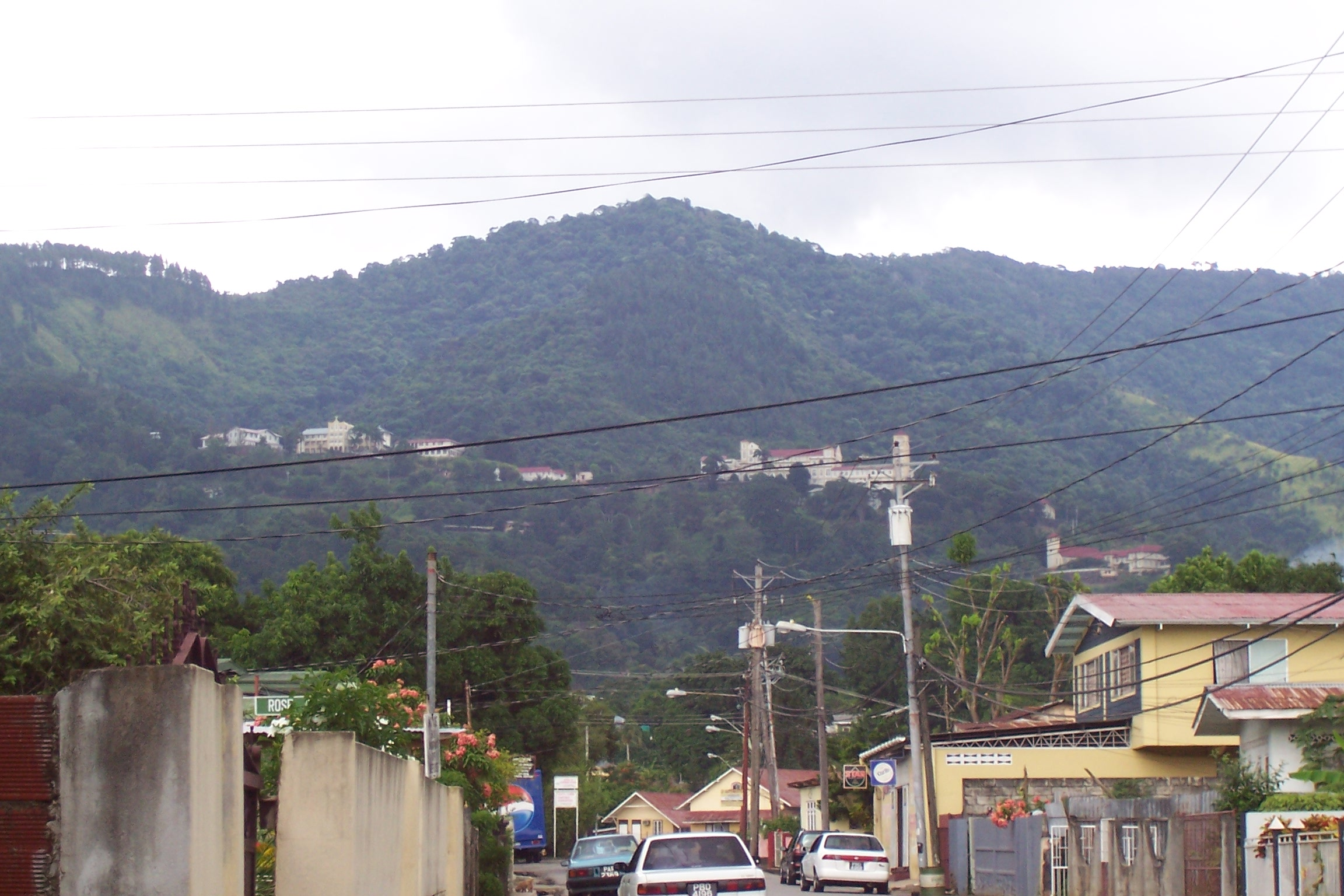
Southern slopes of the Northern Range showing the Benedictine abbey of Mount Saint Benedict

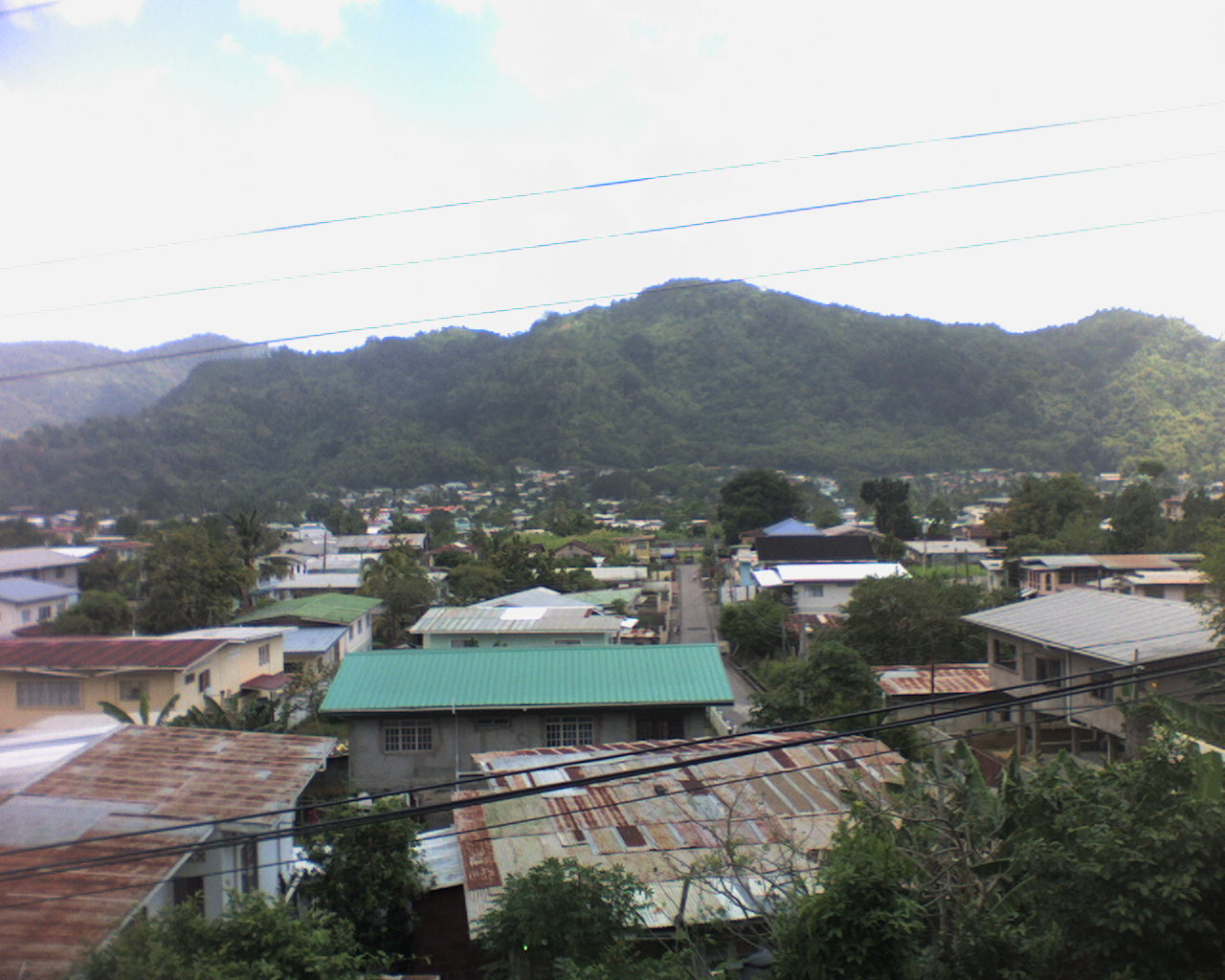
The western Northern Range viewed from the Diego Martin valley

Port of Spain Hills

== See also ==
- Southern Range
- Central Range, Trinidad and Tobago
- Caroni Plain
- Naparima Plain
- Nariva Plain
