= Southern Range =

Mountain range in Trinidad and Tobago

Coordinates: 10°07′N 61°20′W

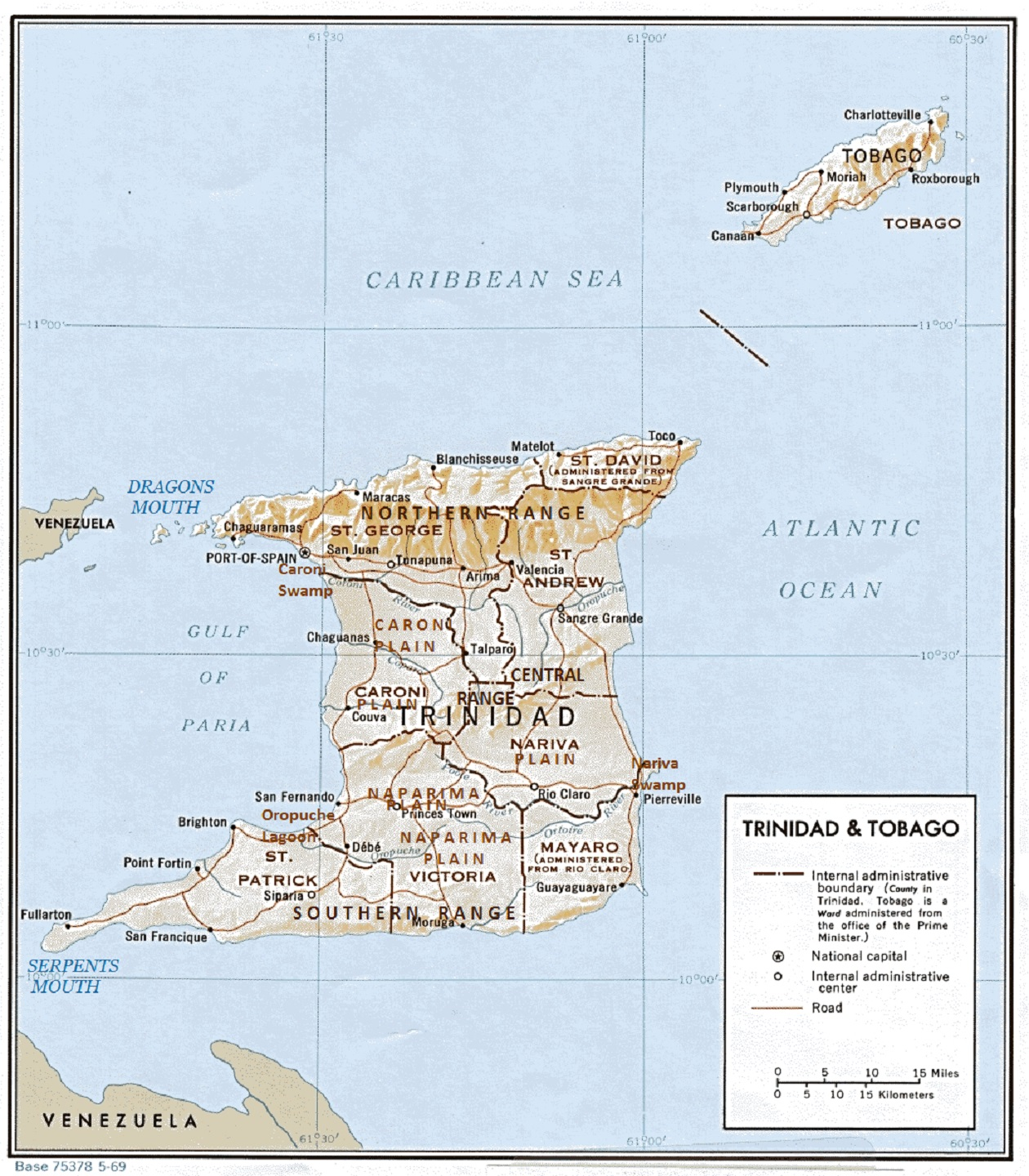
A physical relief map of Trinidad showing the Southern Range.

On the island of Trinidad, the Southern Range is a discontinuous chain of low hills along the southern coast, reaching their highest altitude in the 1,000 feet (300 m) high Trinity Hills of the southeast. According to legend, the sight of the three neighboring hilltops of the then unnamed Trinity Hills, led to Christopher Columbus, on his third voyage to the New World, to name the island, "La Trinidad" (as a form of devotion to his notion of god as the Holy Trinity). The broad lowland area on the west between the Southern Range and the Central Range is the Naparima Plain; the lowland area on the east is the Nariva Plain. The Oropuche River flows through the Naparima Plain and drains into the Oropuche Lagoon, a swampy area, on the Gulf of Paria coast, whereas the 31-mile long Ortoire River flows through the Nariva Plain and drains into the Nariva Swamp on the Atlantic Ocean coast. The Southern region of the island has sandy and less fertile soil. The Southern Range, particularly its Western and Central parts, consists of unconsolidated segments.

The Trinity Hills wildlife reserve and sanctuary is located in the southern range and is rich in wildlife. Howler monkeys, white-fronted capuchin monkeys, Red brocket deer and the elusive Ocelot can be seen here. The Lagon Bouffe mud volcano, one of Trinidad's largest mud volcanos is located here. Trinity Hills is the highest point in the Southern Range, at 325 meters.
