= Trinity Hills =

Coordinates: 10°07′N 61°07′W

The Trinity Hills are a range of hills in southeastern Trinidad. According to legend, it is after these hills that Christopher Columbus named the island of Trinidad. Columbus had promised to name the next land he discovered after the Holy Trinity. The lookout, Alonzo Perez reported that he saw three hills. Based on their location, it has been questioned as to whether Perez could have seen the Trinity Hills. This interpretation has been questioned by Hans Boos who stated that three peaks, presumably Morne Derrick, Gros Morne, and Guaya Hill, are visible when approaching Trinidad from the southeast along the route taken by Columbus.

The Trinity Hills lie between to Guayaguayare and Moruga, on the south coast of Trinidad.
