= Aripo Cave =

Cave in Trinidad and Tobago

Aripo Cave (Aripo Main Cave) is a cave in the Northern Range, in Trinidad and Tobago. This is the longest accessible cave in Trinidad and Tobago, with 862 m length and 160 m depth. It is one of several caves created by recrystallised limestone. The cave is a notable bat roost, and that bats contribute considerable amounts of guano, which in turn support vast numbers of cave-dwelling invertebrates.

One of the caves more notable inhabitants are the Oilbirds. These are the only nocturnal fruit-eating birds in the world. They forage at night, navigating by echolocation in the same way as the bats.
