= Central Range (Trinidad and Tobago) =

Mountain range on the island of Trinidad

Coordinates: 10°25′N 61°15′W

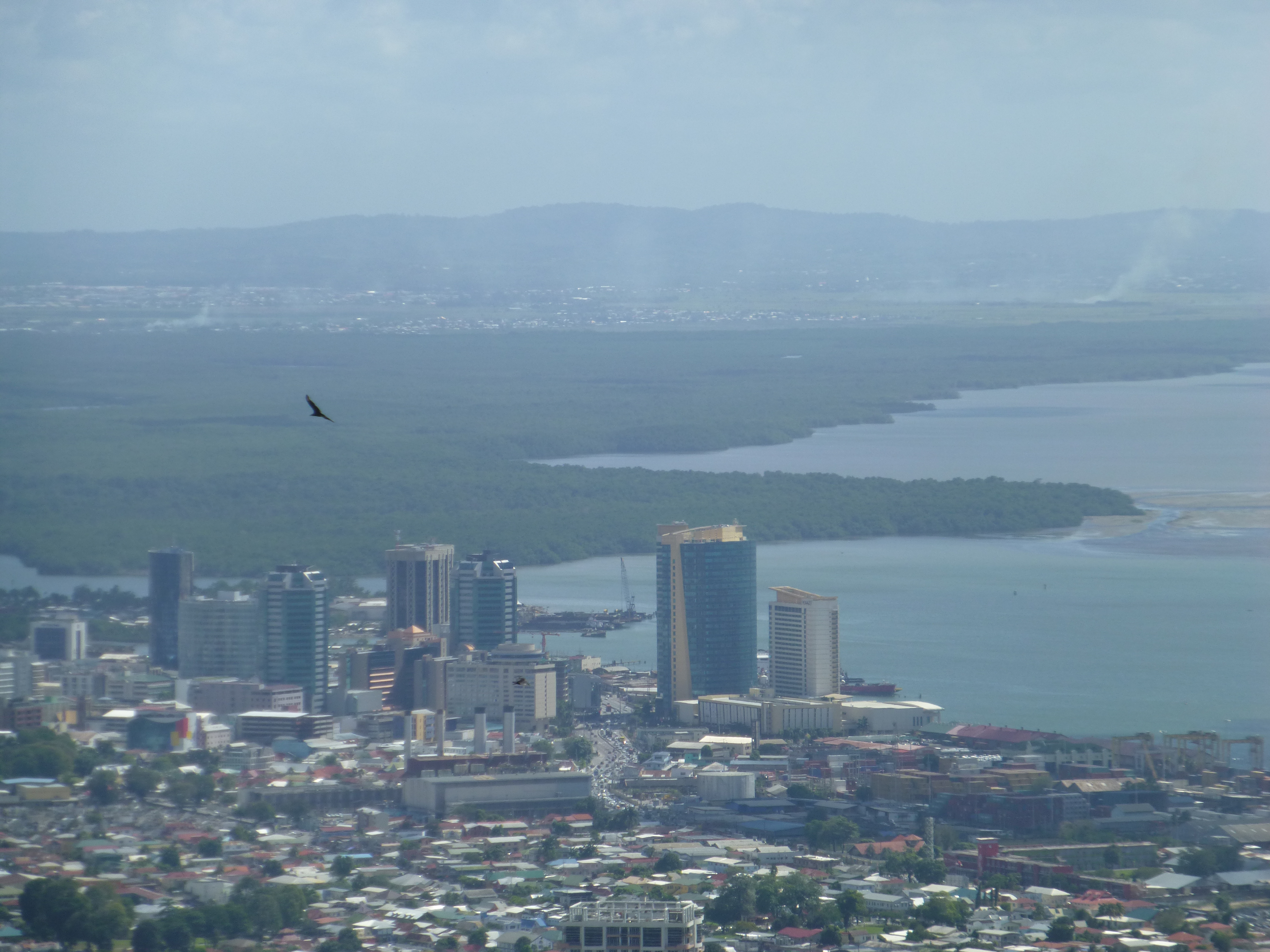
Central Range (in the far background)

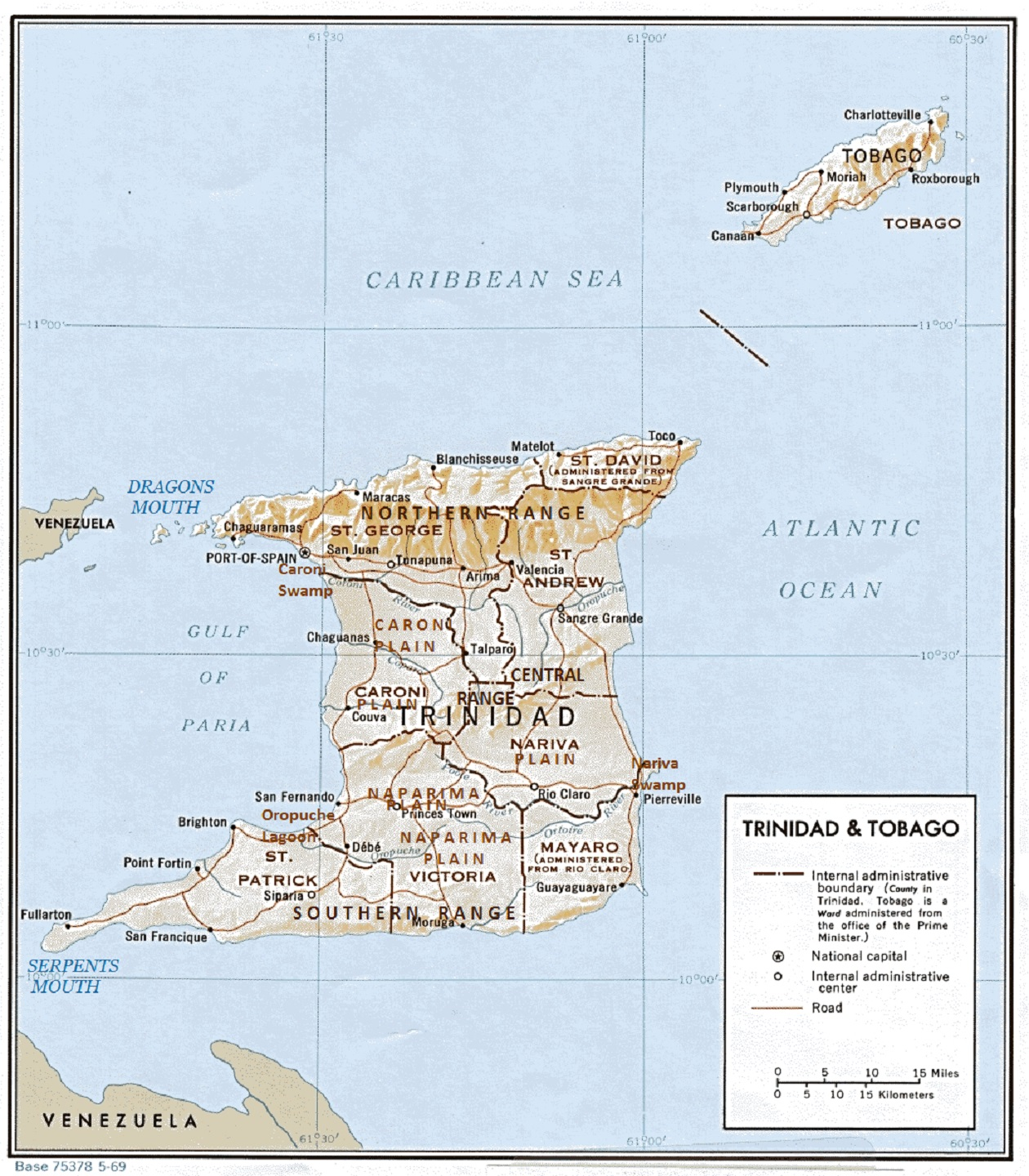
The Central Range shown in a shaded relief map of Trinidad

The Central Range is a mountain range on the island of Trinidad. It extends diagonally across the island and is a low-lying range rising from swampy areas into rolling hills. The tallest hills in the range are Mount Tamana (307 m), Mount Harris and Brigand Hill; all located in the northeastern portion of the range. The Central Range mountains are biodiverse, and are home to the Tamana Caves - the site of Trinidad's largest bat roost. Howler monkeys can be found here and numerous species of birds as well.

There are numerous streams and clean springs that flow from the Central Range. However there are few waterfalls. The most prominent of these falls are the Brasso Venado falls in Brasso Venado, and Gran Couva falls, or Carmelita falls, located in Gran Couva. To the north of the range are the Northern Lowlands (East–West Corridor and Caroni Plain).

== See also ==
- Northern Range
- Southern Range
- Trinity Hills
