= Trinidad =

Largest island of Trinidad and Tobago

Native name: Iëre • Kairi (Arawakan languages) Nickname: Land of the Hummingbird
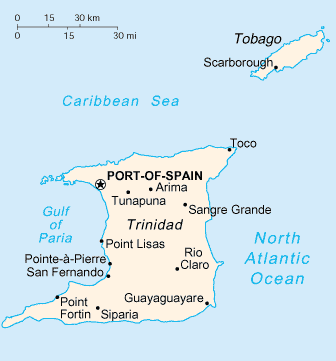
- Map of Trinidad and Tobago

- Location within Lesser Antilles
- Other names: La Isla de la Trinidad (Spanish); Chinidat (Trinidadian Hindustani)

Geography
- Location: Eastern Caribbean
- Coordinates: 10.5°N 61.3°W
- Area: 4,768 km^{2} (1,841 sq mi)
- Highest elevation: 940 m (3080 ft)
- Highest point: El Cerro del Aripo

Administration
- Trinidad and Tobago
- Island: Trinidad
- Regions: 14
- Capital city: Port of Spain
- Largest settlement: Chaguanas (pop. 83,516)
- President: Christine Kangaloo
- Prime Minister: Kamla Persad-Bissessar

Demographics
- Demonym: Trinidadian; Trini (colloquial)
- Population: 1,267,145 (2011)
- Pop. density: 266/km^{2} (689/sq mi)
- Languages: Official; English; Vernacular; Trinidadian English Creole; Other; See Languages of Trinidad and Tobago
- Currency: Trinidad and Tobago dollar (TTD)
- Religions: Christianity; Hinduism; Islam; Spiritual Baptist; Orisha-Shango; Vodunu-Rada; Rastafari; African diaspora religions; Bahá'í; Sikhism; Chinese folk religion; Buddhism; Irreligion; others
- Ethnic groups: 37% Indo–Trinidadians; 31.8% Afro-Trinidadians; 23.5% Mixed; 7.8% Dougla; 1.3% Others (Note: incl. 0.66% European (incl. 0.07% Portuguese), 0.31% Chinese, 0.11% Indigenous, 0.08% Arabs, 0.17% Others (incl. Latin Americans)); 6.4% Not stated

Additional information
- Time zone: AST (UTC −4) (Trinidad does not observe DST)
- Postal code: 10xxxx – 87xxxx

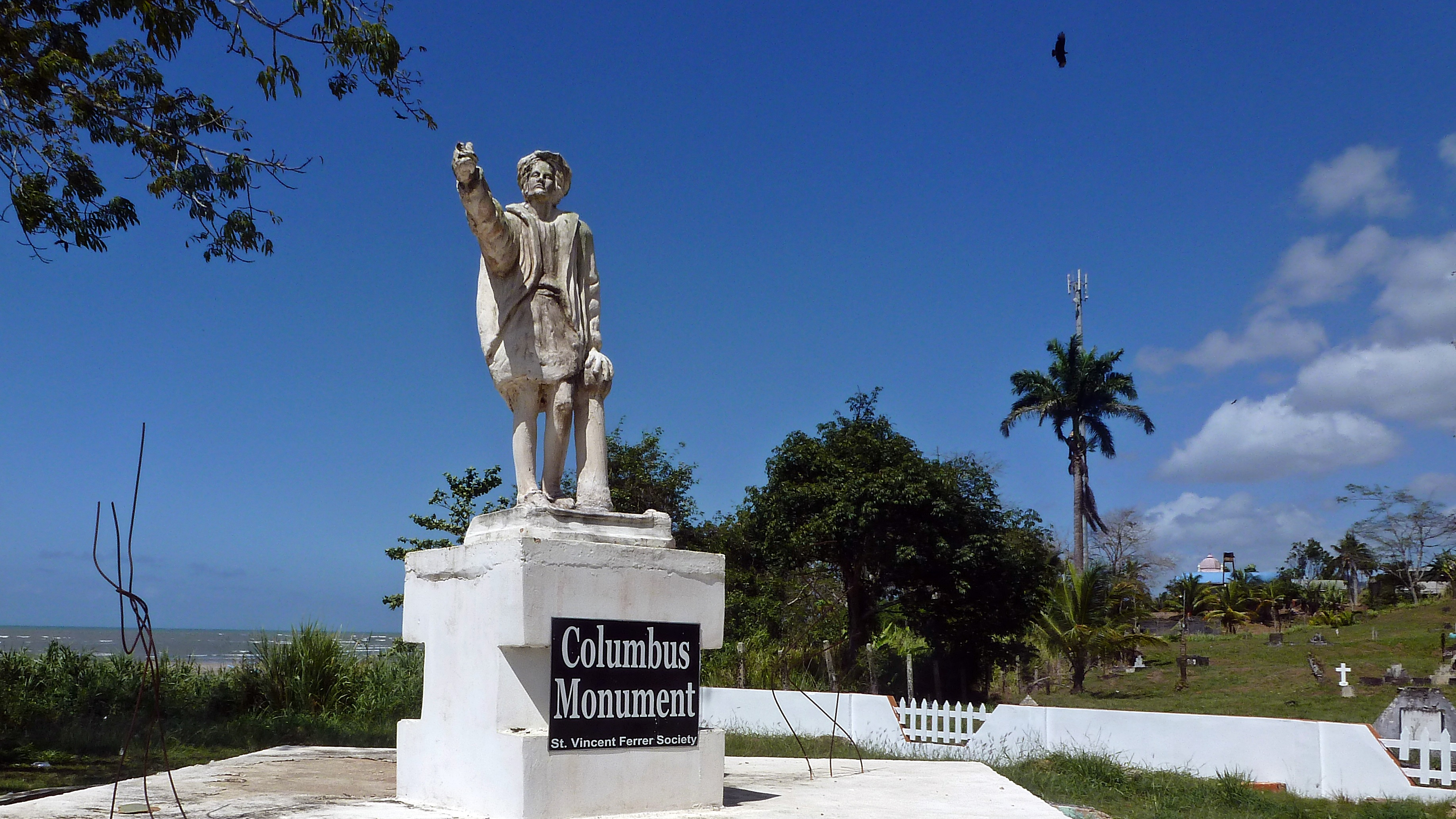
Moruga – Christopher Columbus monument. Columbus landed here on his third voyage in 1498. This is on the southern coast of the island of Trinidad

Trinidad (Note: Pronounced /ˈtrɪnɪdæd/) is the largest and most populous island of the Republic of Trinidad and Tobago. The island lies 11 km (7 mi) off the northeastern coast of Venezuela and sits on the continental shelf of South America. It is the southernmost island in the Caribbean. With an area of 4,768 km^{2} (1,841 sq mi), it is also the fifth-largest in the Caribbean.

== Name ==
The original name for the island in the Arawakan languages was Iëre which meant "Land of the Hummingbird". Christopher Columbus renamed it La Isla de la Trinidad ('The Island of the Trinity'), fulfilling a vow he had made before setting out on his third voyage. This has since been shortened to Trinidad. Indo-Trinidadians called the island चीनीदत्त (Devanagari script), 𑂒𑂲𑂢𑂲𑂠𑂞𑂹𑂞 (Kaithi script), چینی دت (Perso-Arabic script), Chinidat, Chinidad, or Chinitat in Trinidadian Hindustani which translated to the land of sugar. The usage of the term goes back to the 19th century when recruiters from India would call the island Chinidat as a way of luring workers into indentureship. On Tuesday, 31 July 1498 Columbus sent a sailor to climb up to the main top and sighted a cluster of three peaks, therefore Columbus named the island Trinidad from the three peaks and Columbus's special devotion to the Trinity.

== History ==
Kalinago people and Arawakan-speaking people lived in Trinidad long before Christopher Columbus encountered the islands on his third voyage on 31 July 1498. The island remained Spanish until 1797, but it was settled mostly by French colonists from the French Caribbean, especially Martinique. In 1889 the two islands became a single British crown colony. Trinidad and Tobago was granted self-governance in 1958 and independence from the United Kingdom in August 1962, and it became a republic in September 1976.

== Geography ==
Major landforms include the hills of the Northern, Central and Southern Ranges (Dinah ranges), the Caroni, Nariva and Oropouche Swamps, and the Caroni and Naparima Plains. Major river systems include the Caroni, North and South Oropouche and Ortoire Rivers. There are many other natural landforms such as beaches and waterfalls. Trinidad has two seasons per the calendar year: the rainy season and the dry season. El Cerro del Aripo, at 940 metres (3,084 ft), is the highest point in Trinidad. It is part of the Aripo Massif and is located in the Northern Range on the island, northeast of the town of Arima.

== Demographics ==
Largest ethnic group of each region

As of the 2011 Trinidad and Tobago Census, Trinidad's population was 37% Indo-Trinidadian, 32% Afro-Trinidadian, and 24% mixed race. Venezuela has also had a great impact on Trinidad's culture, such as introducing the music style parang to the island. Many groups overlap. For example, a "Dougla" is a person of African and Indian descent.

== Culture ==
There are multiple festivals on Trinidad, featuring the music of the Caribbean and the steelpan (which originated on Trinidad and is the country's national instrument); These festivals include the multi-national, pre-Lenten Carnivál, J'ouvert, and Panorama, the national steelpan competition.

In addition to the traditional Christian holidays and official public days (such as Boxing Day, Christmas, Easter Sunday, Easter Monday, Emancipation Day, Good Friday, Independence Day, Labour Day, New Year's Day, and Republic Day) in Trinidad, the island nation also celebrates a significant percentage of its population's Indian ancestry (of both Hindu and Muslim backgrounds), with officially-recognised holidays such as Divali, Eid al-Fitr and Indian Arrival Day. Sites of cultural or religious significance include Mount Saint Benedict, the Temple in the Sea, and the Karyasiddhi Hanuman murti in Carapichaima.

== Zoology ==
The island of Trinidad has a rich biodiversity. The fauna is overwhelmingly of South American origin. There are about 100 species of mammals including the Guyanese red howler monkey, the collared peccary, the red brocket deer, the ocelot and about 70 species of bats. There are more than 400 species of birds including the endemic Trinidad piping-guan. Reptiles are well represented, with about 92 recorded species including the largest species of snake in the world, the green anaconda, the spectacled caiman, and one of the largest lizards in the Americas, the green iguana. Trinidad is also the largest leatherback turtle nesting site in the western hemisphere; they nest on Trinidad's eastern and northern beaches. There are 37 recorded frog species, including the tiny El Tucuche golden tree frog, Trinidad poison frog, and the more widespread huge cane toad. About 43 species of freshwater fish are known from Trinidad, including the well known guppy. It is estimated that there are at least 80,000 arthropods, and at least 600 species of butterflies.

The William Beebe Tropical Research Station (founded by William Beebe), also known as Simla, lies 8 kilometres (5 mi) north of Arima.

== Economy ==
The economy of Trinidad and Tobago is diversified, based to a large extent on oil and natural gas. It is one of the leading gas-based export centres in the world, being one of the top five exporters of liquefied natural gas and the largest onshore natural gas well was recently discovered in southern Trinidad. This has allowed Trinidad to capitalise on the biggest mineral reserves within its territories. It is an oil-rich country and stable economically.

== Geology ==
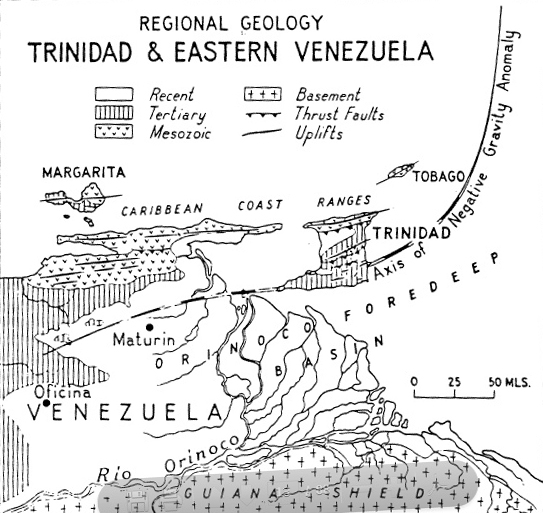
Regional Geology of Trinidad and Venezuela

The Venezuela Tertiary Basin is a subsidence basin formed between the Caribbean and South American plates, and is bounded on the north by the coast ranges of Venezuela and the Northern Range of Trinidad, and bounded on the south by the Guiana Shield. This Guiana Shield supplied fine-grained clastic sediments, which with the subsidence, formed a regional negative gravity anomaly and growth faults. Oil and gas discoveries from the Pliocene Moruga Group include Teak (1968), Samaan (1971), Poui (1972) and Galeota. These fields are mainly faulted anticline traps producing from depths of 1.2 to 4.2 km (0.75 to 2.61 mi) subsea, with Teak possessing a hydrocarbon column almost 1 km (0.62 mi) thick.

The Northern Range is an Upper Jurassic-Lower Cretaceous range of metamorphic rocks striking east and dipping south. The range's southern boundary is marked by a fault extending from the El Pilar Fault System in Venezuela. South of this fault is the Northern Basin, or Caroni Syncline, consisting of Tertiary sedimentary rocks unconformably overlying Jurassic and Cretaceous sedimentary rocks. South of this basin is the Central Range, consisting of Upper Tertiary sedimentary rocks lying unconformably atop Lower Eocene and Paleocene rocks. South of this range is the Naparima Plain, a thrust belt of Oligocene and Lower Tertiary beds.

Hydrocarbon bearing anticlines include those associated with Pitch Lake, Forest Reserve, Point Fortin, Penal, Barrackpore, and Balata Fields. The Los Bajos Fault is a wrench fault, with Lower Pliocene displacement of 6.51 miles, bordered on the north by the Siparia syncline, and on the south by the Erin syncline. Finally, the Southern Range consists of anticlinal folds, including the Rock Dome-Herrera anticline and the Moruga-West Field. East of this Rock Dome are en echelon folds containing the Lizard Springs Field. South of these folds is another fold trend containing the Moruga-East, Guayaguayare, Beach, and Galeota Fields. South of the Morne Diablo-Quinam Erin Field westward is a strongly folded anticline associated with shale diapirism, which extends west southwestward to the Pedernales Field in southeast Venezuela. The northeast portion of the Southern Range separates into a northern trend containing the Lizard Springs, Navette, and Mayaro Fields, while the southern trend contains the Beach Field.

== Recreation ==
Trinidad is considered one of the best places in the world to catch Atlantic tarpon, a species vulnerable to extinction.

== See also ==
- Culture of Trinidad and Tobago
- Hinduism in Trinidad and Tobago
- Islam in Trinidad and Tobago
- Music of Trinidad and Tobago
- Religion in Trinidad and Tobago
- Trinidad and Tobago literature
- Trinidad and Tobago cuisine

== Sources ==
- Bane, S. C.; Chanpong, R. R. (1980). "Geology and Development of the Teak Oil Field, Trinidad, West Indies". in Giant Oil and Gas Fields of the Decade: 1968–1978. AAPG Memoir 30. Tulsa: American Association of Petroleum Geologists. ISBN 0891813063.
