= Black Power Revolution =

1970 Trinidad and Tobago uprising

- Part of Black Power
- Date: 1968–1970
- Location: Trinidad and Tobago
- Methods: Demonstrations, Striking, Mutiny

The Black Power Revolution, also known as the Black Power Movement, 1970 Revolution, Black Power Uprising or February Revolution, was a period of political unrest in Trinidad and Tobago as a result of a series of actions spearheaded by Black power and left-wing political groups in the country aiming to achieve radical socio-political changes.

== History ==
Between 1968 and 1970, a movement gained strength in Trinidad and Tobago around the same time as the civil rights movement in the United States. The National Joint Action Committee (NJAC) was formed out of the Guild of Undergraduates at the St. Augustine campus of the University of the West Indies (UWI). Under the leadership of Geddes Granger (later Makandal Daaga), NJAC and the Black Power Movement appeared as a serious challenge to the authority of Prime Minister Eric Williams.

This was coupled with a growing strike action on behalf of workers by the trade union movement, led by George Weekes of the Oilfields Workers' Trade Union, Clive Nunez of the Transport and Industrial Workers Union and Basdeo Panday, then a young trade union lawyer and activist. The Black Power Revolution began with a 1970 Carnival band named Pinetoppers whose presentation entitled "The Truth about Africa" included portrayals of "revolutionary heroes" including Fidel Castro, Kwame Ture and Tubal Uriah Butler.

This was followed by a series of marches and protests. Williams countered with a broadcast entitled I am for Black Power. He introduced a 5% levy to fund unemployment reduction and later established the first locally owned commercial bank. However, this intervention had little impact on the protests.

== Leadership ==
It was mainly led by NJAC's duo of Makandal Daaga and Khafra Khambon in tandem with other various interests within the trade unions, and other social groups like Afro-Trinidadians and were noted to attract many disaffected members of the then ruling People's National Movement (PNM) under Eric Williams. A large turnout of the disaffected poor of the cities and towns, as well as those black youth of the disaffected communities were attracted to the uprising and were present in the movement, as well as youths and others from the St. Augustine campus of UWI.

== Escalation ==
On 6 April 1970 a protester, Basil Davis, was killed by the police. This was followed on 13 April by the resignation of A. N. R. Robinson, Member of Parliament for Tobago East. The death of this protester led to the movement gaining momentum. On 18 April sugar workers went on strike, and there was talk of a general strike. In response to this, Williams proclaimed a State of Emergency on 21 April and arrested 15 Black Power leaders. Responding in turn, a portion of the Trinidad Defense Force, led by Raffique Shah and Rex Lassalle, mutinied and took hostages at the army barracks at Teteron. Through the action of the Coast Guard, led by Commander David Bloom and negotiations between the Government and the rebels, the mutiny was contained and the mutineers surrendered on 25 April.

Williams made three additional speeches in which he sought to identify himself with the aims of the Black Power movement. He re-shuffled his Cabinet and removed three Ministers (including two white members) and three senators. He also introduced the Public Order Act, which reduced civil liberties in an effort to control protest marches. After public opposition, led by A. N. R. Robinson and his newly created "Action Committee of Democratic Citizens" (which later became the Democratic Action Congress), the bill was withdrawn. Attorney General Karl Hudson-Phillips offered to resign over the failure of the bill, but Williams refused his resignation.

== See also ==
- Black Consciousness Movement
- Black Power
- Afro Surrealism
- Négritude
- Rodney riots

== Notes and references ==
- Zeno Obi Constance, De Roaring 70s:An Introduction to the Politics of the 1970s;
- Brian Meeks, Radical Caribbean: From Black Power to Abu Bakr, University of the West Indies Press, 1996, ISBN 978-9766400231
- Selwyn Ryan & Taimion Stewart (eds), The Black Power Revolution 1970: A Retrospective;
- Susan Craig, "Background to the 1970 Confrontation" in Contemporary Caribbean;
- Ian K. Ramdhanie & Vidya Lall (eds), The Deosaran Files: Two Decades of Social and Political Commentary (1971- 1991); Volume 2: Race, Politics and Democracy;
- Ralph Premdas (ed.), Ethnicity and identity in the Caribbean: Decentering a Myth, The Helen Kellogg Institute for International Studies (1996)
- Holger Henke & Fred Reno (eds), Modern Political Culture in the Caribbean, University of the West Indies Press, ISBN 978-9766401351
- Bridget Brereton, General History of the Caribbean: The Caribbean in the Twentieth Century; Volume V;
- Clement Burkett, Reflections of a Soldier: A Memoir of 1970 and Events Before and After.
