= June 18 =

June 18 this year in various calendars
- Thursday, 18 June 2026
Akan	Nkyiyaw
Armenian	3 Hrotich 1475
Aztec	Teotleco 19, 4 Mazātl
Babylonian	2 Simanu, 2337 SE
Balinese pawukon	Luang, Pepet, Kajeng, Sri, Umanis, Urukung, Wraspati of Dunggulan, Sri, Dadi, Duka
Bengali	4 Asharh, BS 1433
Chinese	Yin Water Pig・Well Mansion; 4 Wǔyuè, Bǐngwǔnián (Mangzhong, 3 days until Xiazhi)
Common Era	18 June 2026 CE
Coptic	11 Paoni, AM 1742
Egyptian	3 Athyr, 2775 NE
Ethiopian	11 Sanē, 2018 Amätä Məhrät
French Republican	Décade III, Décadi de Prairial de l'Année 234 de la République
Gregorian	18 June, AD 2026
Hebrew	3 Tamuz, AM 5786
Hindu	Puṣya・Dhruva; Solar: 4 Āṣāḍha, 1948 SE; Lunisolar: Caturthī, Śukla pakṣa of Jyeṣṭha, 2083 VE; Rāudra・5127 KY・1,872,744
Icelandic	Fimmtudagur, 27 Skerpla 2026
Islamic	2 Muharram, AH 1448 (using tabular method)
ISO week date	2026-W25-4
Japanese	4 Satsuki, Reiwa 8 (Bōshu, 3 days until Geshi)
Julian	5 June, AD 2026 (AM 7534)
Julian day	2461210
Korean	4 Maldal, 4359 DE
Maya	13.0.13.12.7; 0 Tzec, 4 Manik
Roman	Nonis Iuniis, MMDCCLXXIX AUC
Solar Hijri	28 Khordad, SH 1405
Tibetan	4 snron, me pho rta 2153 or 1772 or 1000

<<	June					>>
Su	Mo	Tu	We	Th	Fr	Sa
	1	2	3	4	5	6
7	8	9	10	11	12	13
14	15	16	17	18	19	20
21	22	23	24	25	26	27
28	29	30
2026

June 18 in recent years
2026 (Thursday)
2025 (Wednesday)
2024 (Tuesday)
2023 (Sunday)
2022 (Saturday)
2021 (Friday)
2020 (Thursday)
2019 (Tuesday)
2018 (Monday)
2017 (Sunday)

June 18 is the 169th day of the year (170th in leap years) in the Gregorian calendar; 196 days remain until the end of the year.

== Events ==
=== Pre-1600 ===
- 618 – Li Yuan becomes Emperor Gaozu of Tang, initiating three centuries of Tang dynasty rule over China.
- 656 – Ali becomes Caliph of the Rashidun Caliphate.
- 860 – Byzantine–Rus' War: A fleet of about 200 Rus' vessels sails into the Bosphorus and starts pillaging the suburbs of the Byzantine capital Constantinople.
- 1053 – Battle of Civitate: Three thousand Norman horsemen of Count Humphrey rout the troops of Pope Leo IX.
- 1155 – Pope Adrian IV crowns Frederick Barbarossa as Holy Roman Emperor.
- 1156 – The treaty of Benevento between Pope Adrian IV and William I of Sicily is concluded.
- 1264 – The Parliament of Ireland meets at Castledermot in County Kildare, the first definitively known meeting of this Irish legislature.
- 1265 – A draft Byzantine–Venetian treaty is concluded between Venetian envoys and Emperor Michael VIII Palaiologos, but is not ratified by Doge Reniero Zeno.
- 1391 – Tokhtamysh–Timur war: Battle of the Kondurcha River: Timur defeats Tokhtamysh of the Golden Horde in present-day southeast Russia.
- 1429 – Charles VII's army defeats an English army under John Talbot at the Battle of Patay during the Hundred Years' War. The English lost 2,200 men, over half their army, crippling their efforts during this segment of the war.

=== 1601–1900 ===
- 1633 – Charles I is crowned King of Scots at St Giles' Cathedral, Edinburgh.
- 1684 – The charter of the Massachusetts Bay Colony is revoked via a scire facias writ issued by an English court.
- 1757 – Battle of Kolín between Prussian forces under Frederick the Great and an Austrian army under the command of Field Marshal Count Leopold Joseph von Daun in the Seven Years' War.
- 1778 – American Revolutionary War: The British Army abandons Philadelphia.
- 1799 – Action of 18 June 1799: A frigate squadron under Rear-admiral Jean-Baptiste Perrée is captured by the British fleet under Lord Keith.
- 1803 – Haitian Revolution: The Royal Navy led by Rear-Admiral John Thomas Duckworth commence the blockade of Saint-Domingue against French forces.
- 1812 – The United States declaration of war upon the United Kingdom is signed by President James Madison, beginning the War of 1812.
- 1815 – Napoleonic Wars: The Battle of Waterloo results in the defeat of Napoleon Bonaparte by the Duke of Wellington and Gebhard Leberecht von Blücher, forcing Napoleon to abdicate the throne of France for the second and last time.
- 1822 – Konstantinos Kanaris blows up the Ottoman navy's flagship at Chios, killing the Kapudan Pasha Nasuhzade Ali Pasha.
- 1837 – St. Joseph Mutiny: African soldiers in the 1st West India Regiment – led by former slave trader Daaga – launch a rebellion in the British colony of Trinidad in an attempt to escape to Africa.
- 1858 – Charles Darwin receives a paper from Alfred Russel Wallace that includes nearly identical conclusions about evolution as Darwin's own, prompting Darwin to publish his theory.
- 1859 – First ascent of Aletschhorn, second summit of the Bernese Alps.
- 1873 – Susan B. Anthony is fined $100 for attempting to vote in the 1872 presidential election.
- 1887 – The Reinsurance Treaty between Germany and Russia is signed.

=== 1901–present ===
- 1906 – Sultan Abdelaziz of Morocco ratifies the agreement reached in the Algeciras Conference in a personal decree.
- 1907 – Most resistance societies in Santiago return to work, bringing an end to the 1907 Chilean general strike.
- 1908 – Japanese immigration to Brazil begins when 781 people arrive in Santos aboard the ship Kasato-Maru.
- 1908 – The University of the Philippines is established.
- 1920 – The Troubles in Ulster (1920–1922) begin with a week of sectarian violence in Derry.
- 1928 – Aviator Amelia Earhart becomes the first woman to fly in an aircraft across the Atlantic Ocean (she is a passenger; Wilmer Stultz is the pilot and Lou Gordon the mechanic).
- 1935 – Police in Vancouver, British Columbia, Canada, clash with striking longshoremen, resulting in a total of 60 injuries and 24 arrests.
- 1940 – World War II: Appeal of 18 June by Charles de Gaulle.
- 1940 – World War II: The "Finest Hour" speech is delivered by Winston Churchill.
- 1945 – William Joyce ("Lord Haw-Haw") is charged with treason for his pro-German propaganda broadcasting during World War II.
- 1946 – Dr. Ram Manohar Lohia, a Socialist, calls for a Direct Action Day against the Portuguese in Goa.
- 1948 – Columbia Records introduces the long-playing record album in a public demonstration at the Waldorf-Astoria Hotel in New York City.
- 1948 – Britain, France and the United States announce that on June 21, the Deutsche Mark will be introduced in western Germany and West Berlin. Over the next six days, Communists increasingly restrict access to Berlin.
- 1953 – The Egyptian revolution of 1952 ends with the overthrow of the Muhammad Ali dynasty and the declaration of the Republic of Egypt.
- 1953 – A United States Air Force C-124 crashes and burns near Tachikawa, Japan, killing 129.
- 1954 – Carlos Castillo Armas leads an invasion force across the Guatemalan border, setting in motion the 1954 Guatemalan coup d'état.
- 1958 – Benjamin Britten's one-act opera Noye's Fludde premieres at the Aldeburgh Festival.
- 1965 – Vietnam War: The United States Air Force uses B-52 bombers to attack guerrilla fighters in South Vietnam.
- 1972 – Staines air disaster: One hundred eighteen people are killed when a BEA H.S. Trident crashes minutes after takeoff from London's Heathrow Airport.
- 1979 – SALT II is signed by the United States and the Soviet Union.
- 1981 – The Lockheed F-117 Nighthawk, the first operational aircraft initially designed around stealth technology, makes its first flight.
- 1982 – Italian banker Roberto Calvi's body is discovered hanging beneath Blackfriars Bridge in London, England.
- 1983 – Space Shuttle program: STS-7, astronaut Sally Ride becomes the first American woman in space.
- 1983 – Mona Mahmudnizhad, together with nine other women of the Baháʼí Faith, is sentenced to death and hanged in Shiraz, Iran, over her religious beliefs.
- 1984 – A major clash between about 5,000 police and a similar number of striking miners takes place at Orgreave, South Yorkshire, during the 1984–85 UK miners' strike.
- 1994 – The Troubles: Members of the Ulster Volunteer Force (UVF) attack a crowded pub with assault rifles in Loughinisland, Northern Ireland. Six Catholic civilians are killed and five wounded. It was crowded with people watching the 1994 FIFA World Cup.
- 1998 – Propair Flight 420 crashes near Montréal–Mirabel International Airport in Quebec, Canada, killing 11.
- 2006 – The first Kazakh space satellite, KazSat-1, is launched.
- 2007 – The Charleston Sofa Super Store fire kills nine firefighters in Charleston, South Carolina.
- 2009 – The Lunar Reconnaissance Orbiter (LRO), a NASA robotic spacecraft is launched.
- 2018 – An earthquake of magnitude 6.1 strikes northern Osaka.
- 2023 – Titan, a submersible operated by OceanGate Expeditions, implodes in the North Atlantic Ocean while attempting to view the wreck of the Titanic, killing all five people on board, including OceanGate co-founder and CEO Stockton Rush.

== Births ==
=== Pre-1600 ===
- 1269 – Eleanor of England, Countess of Bar (died 1298)
- 1318 – Eleanor of Woodstock (died 1355)
- 1332 – John V Palaiologos, Byzantine Emperor (died 1391)
- 1466 – Ottaviano Petrucci, Italian printer (died 1539)
- 1511 – Bartolomeo Ammannati, Italian architect and sculptor, designed the Ponte Santa Trinita (died 1592)
- 1517 – Emperor Ōgimachi of Japan (died 1593)
- 1521 – Maria of Portugal, Duchess of Viseu (died 1577)

=== 1601–1900 ===
- 1667 – Ivan Trubetskoy, Russian field marshal (died 1750)
- 1673 – Antonio de Literes, Spanish composer (died 1747)
- 1677 – Antonio Maria Bononcini, Italian cellist and composer (died 1726)
- 1716 – Joseph-Marie Vien, French painter and educator (died 1809)
- 1717 – Johann Stamitz, Czech violinist and composer (died 1757)
- 1757 – Ignaz Pleyel, Austrian-French pianist and composer (died 1831)
- 1757 – Gervasio Antonio de Posadas, Argentine lawyer and politician 1st Supreme Director of the United Provinces of the Río de la Plata (died 1833)
- 1769 – Robert Stewart, Viscount Castlereagh, Irish-English politician, Secretary of State for Foreign and Commonwealth Affairs (died 1822)
- 1799 – William Lassell, English astronomer and merchant (died 1880)
- 1812 – Ivan Goncharov, Russian journalist and author (died 1891)
- 1815 – Ludwig Freiherr von und zu der Tann-Rathsamhausen, German general (died 1881)
- 1816 – Hélène Napoleone Bonaparte, French daughter of Napoleon (died 1907)
- 1816 – Jung Bahadur Rana, Nepali ruler (died 1877)
- 1833 – Manuel González Flores, Mexican general and President (1880-1884) (died 1893)
- 1834 – Auguste-Théodore-Paul de Broglie, French philosopher and academic (died 1895)
- 1839 – William H. Seward Jr., American general and banker (died 1920)
- 1845 – Charles Louis Alphonse Laveran, French physician and parasitologist, Nobel Prize laureate (died 1922)
- 1850 – Richard Heuberger, Austrian composer and critic (died 1914)
- 1854 – E. W. Scripps, American publisher, founded the E. W. Scripps Company (died 1926)
- 1857 – Henry Clay Folger, American businessman and philanthropist, founded the Folger Shakespeare Library (died 1930)
- 1858 – Andrew Forsyth, Scottish-English mathematician and academic (died 1942)
- 1858 – Hector Rason, English-Australian politician, 7th Premier of Western Australia (died 1927)
- 1862 – Carolyn Wells, American novelist and poet (died 1942)
- 1863 – George Essex Evans, English-Australian poet and author (died 1909)
- 1868 – Miklós Horthy, Hungarian admiral and politician, Regent of Hungary (died 1957)
- 1870 – Édouard Le Roy, French mathematician and philosopher (died 1954)
- 1877 – James Montgomery Flagg, American painter and illustrator (died 1960)
- 1881 – Zoltán Halmay, Hungarian swimmer (died 1956)
- 1882 – Georgi Dimitrov, Bulgarian compositor and politician, 32nd Prime Minister of Bulgaria (died 1949)
- 1884 – Édouard Daladier, French captain and politician, Prime Minister of France (died 1970)
- 1886 – George Mallory, English lieutenant and mountaineer (died 1924)
- 1886 – Alexander Wetmore, American ornithologist and paleontologist (died 1978)
- 1887 – Tancrède Labbé, Canadian businessman and politician (died 1956)
- 1896 – Blanche Sweet, American actress (died 1986)
- 1897 – Martti Marttelin, Finnish runner (died 1940)
- 1900 – Vlasta Vraz, Czech-American relief worker, editor, and fundraiser (died 1989)

=== 1901–present ===
- 1901 – Grand Duchess Anastasia Nikolaevna of Russia (died 1918)
- 1901 – Llewellyn Rees, English actor (died 1994)
- 1902 – Louis Alter, American musician (died 1980)
- 1902 – Paavo Yrjölä, Finnish decathlete (died 1980)
- 1903 – Jeanette MacDonald, American actress and singer (died 1965)
- 1903 – Raymond Radiguet, French author and poet (died 1923)
- 1904 – Keye Luke, Chinese-American actor (died 1991)
- 1904 – Manuel Rosenthal, French conductor and composer (died 2003)
- 1905 – Eduard Tubin, Estonian composer and conductor (died 1982)
- 1906 – Kay Kyser, American bandleader and radio personality(died 1985)
- 1907 – Frithjof Schuon, Swiss-American metaphysicist, philosopher, and author (died 1998)
- 1908 – Bud Collyer, American actor and game show host (died 1969)
- 1908 – Stanley Knowles, American-Canadian academic and politician (died 1997)
- 1908 – Nedra Volz, American actress (died 2003)
- 1910 – Dick Foran, American actor and singer (died 1979)
- 1910 – Avon Long, American actor and singer (died 1984)
- 1910 – Ray McKinley, American singer, drummer, and bandleader (died 1995)
- 1912 – Glenn Morris, American decathlete (died 1974)
- 1913 – Wilfred Gordon Bigelow, Canadian soldier and surgeon (died 2005)
- 1913 – Sammy Cahn, American pianist and composer (died 1993)
- 1913 – Sylvia Porter, American economist and journalist (died 1991)
- 1913 – Françoise Loranger, Canadian playwright and producer (died 1995)
- 1913 – Robert Mondavi, American winemaker and philanthropist (died 2008)
- 1913 – Oswald Teichmüller, German mathematician (died 1943)
- 1914 – E. G. Marshall, American actor (died 1998)
- 1914 – Efraín Huerta, Mexican poet (died 1982)
- 1915 – Red Adair, American firefighter (died 2004)
- 1915 – Robert Kanigher, American author (died 2002)
- 1915 – Alice T. Schafer, American mathematician (died 2009)
- 1916 – Julio César Turbay Ayala, Colombian lawyer and politician, 25th President of Colombia (died 2005)
- 1917 – Richard Boone, American actor, singer, and director (died 1981)
- 1917 – Jack Karnehm, English snooker player and sportscaster (died 2002)
- 1917 – Erik Ortvad, Danish painter and illustrator (died 2008)
- 1918 – Alf Francis, West Prussia-born, English motor racing mechanic and race car constructor (died 1983)
- 1918 – Jerome Karle, American chemist and academic, Nobel Prize laureate (died 2013)
- 1918 – Franco Modigliani, Italian-American economist and academic, Nobel Prize laureate (died 2003)
- 1919 – Jüri Järvet, Estonian actor and screenwriter (died 1995)
- 1920 – Ian Carmichael, English actor and singer (died 2010)
- 1920 – Aster Berkhof, Belgian author and academic (died 2020)
- 1922 – Claude Helffer, French pianist and educator (died 2004)
- 1924 – George Mikan, American basketball player and coach (died 2005)
- 1925 – Robert Beadell, American composer and educator (died 1994)
- 1926 – Philip B. Crosby, American businessman and author (died 2001)
- 1926 – Allan Sandage, American astronomer and cosmologist (died 2010)
- 1926 – Tom Wicker, American journalist and author (died 2011)
- 1927 – Eva Bartok, Hungarian-English actress (died 1998)
- 1927 – Paul Eddington, English actor (died 1995)
- 1928 – Michael Blakemore, Australian actor, director, and screenwriter (died 2023)
- 1928 – David T. Lykken, American geneticist and academic (died 2006)
- 1929 – Jürgen Habermas, German sociologist and philosopher (died 2026)
- 1929 – Tibor Rubin, Hungarian-American soldier, Medal of Honor recipient (died 2015)
- 1929 – Björn Lüning, Swedish chemist (died 2024)
- 1931 – Fernando Henrique Cardoso, Brazilian sociologist, academic, and politician, 34th President of Brazil
- 1932 – Dudley R. Herschbach, American chemist and academic, Nobel Prize laureate
- 1932 – Geoffrey Hill, English poet and academic (died 2016)
- 1933 – Colin Brumby, Australian composer and conductor (died 2018)
- 1933 – Tommy Hunt, American singer (died 2025)
- 1934 – Brian Kenny, English general (died 2017)
- 1934 – Mitsuteru Yokoyama, Japanese author and illustrator (died 2004)
- 1934 – Barack Obama Sr., Kenyan economist (died 1982)
- 1936 – Denny Hulme, New Zealand race car driver (died 1992)
- 1936 – Ronald Venetiaan, Surinamese politician, 6th President of Suriname (died 2025)
- 1937 – Del Harris, American basketball player and coach
- 1937 – Jay Rockefeller, American lawyer and politician, 29th Governor of West Virginia
- 1937 – Bruce Trigger, Canadian archaeologist, anthropologist and historian (died 2006)
- 1937 – Vitaly Zholobov, Ukrainian colonel, engineer, and astronaut
- 1938 – Kevin Murray, Australian footballer and coach
- 1939 – Lou Brock, American baseball player and sportscaster (died 2020)
- 1939 – Jean-Claude Germain, Canadian historian, author, and journalist
- 1939 – Brooks Firestone, American businessman and politician
- 1941 – Roger Lemerre, French footballer and manager
- 1941 – Paul Mayersberg, English director and screenwriter
- 1941 – Delia Smith, English chef and author
- 1942 – John Bellany, Scottish painter (died 2013)
- 1942 – Roger Ebert, American journalist, critic, and screenwriter (died 2013)
- 1942 – Pat Hutchins, English author and illustrator (died 2017)
- 1942 – Thabo Mbeki, South African politician and 2nd President of South Africa
- 1942 – Paul McCartney, English singer-songwriter and guitarist
- 1942 – Richard Perry, American record producer (died 2024)
- 1942 – Carl Radle, American bass player and producer (died 1980)
- 1942 – Nick Tate, Australian actor and director
- 1942 – Hans Vonk, Dutch conductor (died 2004)
- 1943 – Barry Evans, English actor (died 1997)
- 1943 – Raffaella Carrà, Italian singer, dancer, and actress (died 2021)
- 1943 – Éva Marton, Hungarian soprano and actress
- 1944 – Bruce DuMont, American broadcaster and political analyst
- 1944 – Sandy Posey, American pop/country singer
- 1946 – Russell Ash, English journalist and author (died 2010)
- 1946 – Bruiser Brody, American wrestler (died 1988)
- 1946 – Fabio Capello, Italian footballer and manager
- 1946 – Maria Bethânia, Brazilian singer
- 1946 – Gordon Murray, British automobile designer
- 1947 – Ivonne Coll, Puerto Rican-American model and actress, Miss Puerto Rico 1967
- 1947 – Bernard Giraudeau, French actor, director, producer, and screenwriter (died 2010)
- 1947 – Linda Thorson, Canadian actress
- 1948 – Philip Jackson, English actor
- 1948 – Sherry Turkle, American academic, psychologist, and sociologist
- 1949 – Chris Van Allsburg, American author and illustrator
- 1949 – Jarosław Kaczyński, Polish lawyer and politician, 13th Prime Minister of Poland
- 1949 – Lech Kaczyński, Polish lawyer and politician, 4th President of Poland (died 2010)
- 1950 – Rod de'Ath, Welsh drummer and producer (died 2014)
- 1950 – Annelie Ehrhardt, German hurdler
- 1950 – Mike Johanns, American lawyer and politician, 28th United States Secretary of Agriculture
- 1950 – Jackie Leven, Scottish singer-songwriter and guitarist (died 2011)
- 1951 – Mohammed Al-Sager, Kuwaiti journalist and politician
- 1951 – Miriam Flynn, American actress and comedian
- 1951 – Ian Hargreaves, English-Welsh journalist and academic
- 1951 – Stephen Hopper, Australian botanist and academic
- 1951 – Gyula Sax, Hungarian chess player (died 2014)
- 1952 – Tiiu Aro, Estonian physician and politician, Estonian Minister of Social Affairs
- 1952 – Denis Herron, Canadian ice hockey player
- 1952 – Carol Kane, American actress
- 1952 – Isabella Rossellini, Italian actress, director, producer, and screenwriter
- 1952 – Lee Soo-man, South Korean singer and businessman, founded S.M. Entertainment
- 1953 – Peter Donohoe, English pianist and educator
- 1955 – Ed Fast, Canadian lawyer and politician
- 1956 – Brian Benben, American actor and producer
- 1956 – John Scott, English organist and conductor (died 2015)
- 1957 – Miguel Ángel Lotina, Spanish footballer and manager
- 1957 – Richard Powers, American novelist
- 1958 – Peter Altmaier, German jurist and politician, Federal Minister for Special Affairs of Germany
- 1958 – Gary Martin, British voice actor and actor
- 1959 – Joe Ansolabehere, American animation screenwriter and producer
- 1960 – Barbara Broccoli, American director and producer
- 1960 – Steve Murphy, Canadian journalist
- 1961 – Oz Fox, American singer-songwriter, guitarist, and producer
- 1961 – Andrés Galarraga, Venezuelan baseball player
- 1961 – Angela Johnson, American novelist and poet
- 1961 – Alison Moyet, English singer-songwriter
- 1962 – Lisa Randall, American physicist and academic
- 1963 – Dizzy Reed, American keyboard player and songwriter
- 1963 – Bruce Smith, American football player
- 1964 – Uday Hussein, Iraqi commander (died 2003)
- 1964 – Patti Webster, American publicist and author (died 2013)
- 1966 – Kurt Browning, Canadian figure skater, choreographer, and sportscaster
- 1966 – Troy Kemp, Bahamian high jumper
- 1966 – Dexter Romweber, American musician (died 2024)
- 1967 – Clifton Campbell, American sprinter
- 1968 – Frank Müller, German decathlete
- 1969 – Haki Doku, Albanian cyclist
- 1969 – Christopher Largen, American journalist and author (died 2012)
- 1970 – Katie Derham, English journalist
- 1970 – Ivan Kozák, Slovak footballer
- 1970 – Greg Yaitanes, American director and producer
- 1971 – Kerry Butler, American actress and singer
- 1971 – Jason McAteer, English-Irish footballer and manager
- 1971 – Nathan Morris, American soul singer
- 1971 – Nigel Owens, Welsh rugby referee and TV presenter
- 1972 – Anu Tali, Estonian pianist and conductor
- 1972 – Wikus du Toit, South African actor, director, and composer
- 1973 – Julie Depardieu, French actress
- 1973 – Stephen Thomas Erlewine, American author and music critic
- 1973 – Ray LaMontagne, American singer-songwriter and guitarist
- 1973 – Alexandra Meissnitzer, Austrian skier
- 1973 – Matt Parsons, Australian rugby league player
- 1973 – Gavin Wanganeen, Australian footballer and coach
- 1974 – Vincenzo Montella, Italian footballer and manager
- 1974 – Sergey Sharikov, Russian fencer and coach (died 2015)
- 1975 – Marie Gillain, Belgian actress
- 1975 – Aleksandrs Koliņko, Latvian footballer
- 1975 – Martin St. Louis, Canadian ice hockey player
- 1976 – Blake Shelton, American singer-songwriter and guitarist
- 1978 – Wang Liqin, Chinese table tennis player
- 1978 – Tara Platt, American actress, producer, and screenwriter
- 1979 – Yumiko Kobayashi, Japanese voice actress and singer
- 1979 – Ivana Wong, Hong Kong singer-songwriter and actress
- 1980 – Antonio Gates, American football player
- 1980 – Sergey Kirdyapkin, Russian race walker
- 1980 – Craig Mottram, Australian runner
- 1980 – Antero Niittymäki, Finnish ice hockey player
- 1981 – Scooter Braun, American music executive
- 1981 – Clint Newton, American-Australian rugby league player
- 1981 – Marco Streller, Swiss footballer
- 1982 – Nadir Belhadj, French-Algerian footballer
- 1982 – Marco Borriello, Italian footballer
- 1982 – Nathan Cavaleri, Australian singer-songwriter, guitarist, and actor
- 1983 – Billy Slater, Australian rugby league player
- 1983 – Cameron Smith, Australian rugby league player
- 1984 – Nanyak Dala, Canadian rugby player
- 1985 – Chris Coghlan, American baseball player
- 1985 – Alex Hirsch, American animator and television producer
- 1986 – Edgars Eriņš, Latvian decathlete
- 1986 – Richard Gasquet, French tennis player
- 1986 – Richard Madden, Scottish actor
- 1987 – Omar Arellano, Mexican footballer
- 1987 – Moeen Ali, English cricketer
- 1988 – Elini Dimoutsos, Greek footballer
- 1988 – Josh Dun, American musician
- 1989 – Pierre-Emerick Aubameyang, French-born Gabonese footballer
- 1989 – Chris Harris Jr., American football player
- 1990 – Luke Adam, Canadian ice hockey player
- 1990 – Sandra Izbașa, Romanian gymnast
- 1990 – Derek Stepan, American ice hockey player
- 1990 – Christian Taylor, American triple jumper
- 1993 – Dennis Lloyd, Israeli musician, producer, singer, songwriter, and multi-instrumentalist
- 1994 – Sean McMahon, Australian rugby player
- 1994 – Takeoff, American rapper (died 2022)
- 1995 – Maxim Kovtun, Russian figure skater
- 1996 – Alen Halilović, Croatian footballer
- 1996 – Niki Wories, Dutch figure skater
- 1997 – Katharina Hobgarski, German tennis player
- 1997 – Latrell Mitchell, Australian rugby league player
- 1999 – Choi Ye-won, South Korean singer and actress
- 1999 – Trippie Redd, American rapper
- 2001 – Evan Mobley, American basketball player
- 2004 – Gabi Moura, Brazilian influencer
- 2005 – Kane Parsons, American YouTuber and filmmaker

== Deaths ==
=== Pre-1600 ===
- 741 – Leo III the Isaurian, Byzantine emperor (born 685)
- 908 – Zhang Hao, general of Yang Wu
- 1095 – Sophia of Hungary (born c. 1050)
- 1164 – Elisabeth of Schönau, German Benedictine visionary (born c. 1129)
- 1234 – Emperor Chūkyō of Japan (born 1218)
- 1250 – Theresa of Portugal, Queen of León
- 1291 – Alfonso III of Aragon (born 1265)
- 1333 – Henry XV, Duke of Bavaria (born 1312)
- 1464 – Rogier van der Weyden, Flemish painter (born 1400)
- 1588 – Robert Crowley, English minister and poet (born 1517)

=== 1601–1900 ===
- 1629 – Piet Pieterszoon Hein, Dutch admiral (born 1577)
- 1650 – Christoph Scheiner, German priest, physicist, and astronomer (born 1575)
- 1673 – Jeanne Mance, French-Canadian nurse, founded the Hôtel-Dieu de Montréal (born 1606)
- 1704 – Tom Brown, English author and translator (born 1662)
- 1726 – Michel Richard Delalande, French organist and composer (born 1657)
- 1742 – John Aislabie, English politician, Chancellor of the Exchequer (born 1670)
- 1749 – Ambrose Philips, English poet and politician (born 1674)
- 1772 – Johann Ulrich von Cramer, German jurist and scholar (born 1706)
- 1772 – Gerard van Swieten, Dutch-Austrian physician and reformer (born 1700)
- 1788 – Adam Gib, Scottish religious leader (born 1714)
- 1794 – François Buzot, French lawyer and politician (born 1760)
- 1794 – James Murray, Scottish-English general and politician, 20th Governor of the Province of Quebec (born 1721)
- 1804 – Maria Amalia, Duchess of Parma (born 1746)
- 1815 – Thomas Picton, Welsh-English general and politician (born 1758)
- 1833 – Robert Hett Chapman, American minister, missionary, and academic (born 1771)
- 1835 – William Cobbett, English farmer and journalist (born 1763)
- 1860 – Friedrich Wilhelm von Bismarck, German army officer and writer (born 1783)
- 1866 – Prince Sigismund of Prussia (born 1864)

=== 1901–present ===
- 1902 – Samuel Butler, English novelist, satirist, and critic (born 1835)
- 1905 – Carmine Crocco, Italian soldier (born 1830)
- 1916 – Max Immelmann, German lieutenant and pilot (born 1890)
- 1917 – Titu Maiorescu, Romanian critic and politician, 23rd Prime Minister of Romania (born 1840)
- 1921 – Abdul Awwal Jaunpuri, Indian Islamic scholar and author (born 1867)
- 1922 – Jacobus Kapteyn, Dutch astronomer and academic (born 1851)
- 1926 – Olga Constantinovna of Russia, Queen consort of the Hellenes (born 1851)
- 1928 – Roald Amundsen, Norwegian pilot and explorer (born 1872)
- 1936 – Maxim Gorky, Russian novelist, short story writer, and playwright (born 1868)
- 1937 – Gaston Doumergue, French politician, 13th President of France (born 1863)
- 1942 – Arthur Pryor, American trombonist, bandleader, and politician (born 1870)
- 1943 – Elias Degiannis, Greek commander (born 1912)
- 1945 – Florence Bascom, American geologist and educator (born 1862)
- 1945 – Simon Bolivar Buckner Jr., American general (born 1886)
- 1947 – Shigematsu Sakaibara, Japanese admiral (born 1898)
- 1948 – Edward Brooker, English-Australian politician, 31st Premier of Tasmania (born 1891)
- 1959 – Ethel Barrymore, American actress (born 1879)
- 1963 – Pedro Armendáriz, Mexican-American actor (born 1912)
- 1964 – Giorgio Morandi, Italian painter (born 1890)
- 1967 – Geki, Italian race car driver (born 1937)
- 1967 – Beat Fehr, Swiss race car driver (born 1942)
- 1971 – Thomas Gomez, American actor (born 1905)
- 1971 – Paul Karrer, Russian-Swiss chemist and academic, Nobel Prize laureate (born 1889)
- 1974 – Júlio César de Mello e Souza, Brazilian mathematician and academic (born 1896)
- 1974 – Georgy Zhukov, Russian marshal and politician, Minister of Defence for the Soviet Union (born 1896)
- 1975 – Hugo Bergmann, German-Israeli philosopher and author (born 1883)
- 1978 – Walter C. Alvarez, American physician and author (born 1884)
- 1980 – Terence Fisher, English director and screenwriter (born 1904)
- 1980 – André Leducq, French cyclist (born 1904)
- 1982 – Djuna Barnes, American novelist, journalist, and playwright (born 1892)
- 1982 – John Cheever, American novelist and short story writer (born 1912)
- 1982 – Curd Jürgens, German-Austrian actor and director (born 1915)
- 1984 – Alan Berg, American lawyer and radio host (born 1934)
- 1985 – Paul Colin, French illustrator (born 1892)
- 1986 – Frances Scott Fitzgerald, American journalist (born 1921)
- 1989 – I. F. Stone, American journalist and author (born 1907)
- 1992 – Kofoworola Abeni Pratt, the first black Chief Nursing Officer of Nigeria (born 1910)
- 1992 – Peter Allen, Australian singer-songwriter and pianist (born 1944)
- 1992 – Mordecai Ardon, Polish-Israeli painter and educator (born 1896)
- 1993 – Craig Rodwell, American activist, founded the Oscar Wilde Bookshop (born 1940)
- 1996 – Endel Puusepp, Estonian-Soviet military pilot and politician (born 1909)
- 1997 – Lev Kopelev, Ukrainian-German author and academic (born 1912)
- 1998 – Felix Knight, American actor and tenor (born 1908)
- 2000 – Nancy Marchand, American actress (born 1928)
- 2003 – Larry Doby, American baseball player and manager (born 1923)
- 2005 – Mushtaq Ali, Indian cricketer (born 1914)
- 2005 – Manuel Sadosky, Argentinian mathematician and academic (born 1914)
- 2006 – Vincent Sherman, American actor, director, and screenwriter (born 1906)
- 2006 – Joseph Zobel, Martinique-French author (born 1915)
- 2007 – Bernard Manning, English comedian and actor (born 1930)
- 2007 – Hank Medress, American singer and producer (born 1938)
- 2007 – Georges Thurston, Canadian singer-songwriter (born 1951)
- 2008 – Jean Delannoy, French actor, director, and screenwriter (born 1908)
- 2008 – Tasha Tudor, American author and illustrator (born 1915)
- 2008 – Hans Steinbrenner, German sculptor (born 1928)
- 2010 – Trent Acid, American wrestler (born 1980)
- 2010 – José Saramago, Portuguese novelist Nobel Prize laureate (born 1922)
- 2010 – Okan Demiriş, Turkish composer (born 1942)
- 2011 – Yelena Bonner, Russian activist (born 1923)
- 2011 – Frederick Chiluba, Zambian politician, 2nd President of Zambia (born 1943)
- 2011 – Clarence Clemons, American saxophonist (born 1942)
- 2012 – Horacio Coppola, Argentinian photographer and director (born 1906)
- 2012 – Lina Haag, German author and activist (born 1907)
- 2012 – Tom Maynard, Welsh cricketer (born 1989)
- 2012 – Luis Edgardo Mercado Jarrín, Peruvian general and politician, 109th Prime Minister of Peru (born 1919)
- 2012 – Alketas Panagoulias, Greek footballer and manager (born 1934)
- 2012 – William Van Regenmorter, American businessman and politician (born 1939)
- 2013 – Brent F. Anderson, American engineer and politician (born 1932)
- 2013 – Alastair Donaldson, Scottish bass player (born 1955)
- 2013 – Garde Gardom, Canadian lawyer and politician, 26th Lieutenant Governor of British Columbia (born 1924)
- 2013 – Michael Hastings, American journalist and author (born 1980)
- 2013 – David Wall, English ballet dancer (born 1946)
- 2014 – Stephanie Kwolek, American chemist and engineer (born 1923)
- 2014 – Johnny Mann, American singer-songwriter and conductor (born 1928)
- 2014 – Claire Martin, Canadian author (born 1914)
- 2014 – Vladimir Popovkin, Russian general (born 1957)
- 2014 – Horace Silver, American pianist and composer (born 1928)
- 2015 – Phil Austin, American comedian, actor, and screenwriter (born 1941)
- 2015 – Ralph J. Roberts, American businessman, co-founded Comcast (born 1920)
- 2015 – Danny Villanueva, American football player and broadcaster, co-founded Univision (born 1937)
- 2015 – Allen Weinstein, American historian and academic (born 1937)
- 2016 – Jeppiaar, Indian educationist, founder and chancellor of Sathyabama University (born 1931)
- 2018 – XXXTentacion, American rapper (born 1998)
- 2018 – Big Van Vader (also known as Vader) American professional wrestler (born 1955)
- 2018 – Jimmy Wopo, American rapper (born 1997)
- 2020 – Vera Lynn, English singer who was the "Forces' Sweetheart" in World War II (born 1917)
- 2022 – Uffe Ellemann-Jensen, Danish politician, minister of foreign affairs (born 1941)
- 2022 – Adibah Noor, Malaysian actress, singer, master of ceremonies (born 1970)
- 2023 – Notable victims of the Titan submersible implosion:
  - Shahzada Dawood, Pakistani-British businessman (born 1975)
  - Hamish Harding, British businessman (born 1964)
  - Paul-Henri Nargeolet, French navy commander and explorer (born 1946)
  - Stockton Rush, American businessman, CEO and founder of OceanGate (born 1962)
- 2024 – James Chance, American musician (born 1953)
- 2024 – Anouk Aimée, French actress (born 1932)
- 2024 – Yoyong Martirez, Filipino basketball player (born 1946)
- 2024 – Willie Mays, American baseball player (born 1931)
- 2026 – Tay Keith, American record producer (born 1996)

== Holidays and observances ==
- Autistic Pride Day (International)
- Christian feast day:
  - Bernard Mizeki (Anglican and Episcopal Church)
  - Elisabeth of Schönau
  - Gregorio Barbarigo
  - Leontius, Hypatius and Theodulus
  - Marina the Monk (Maronite Church, Coptic Orthodox Church of Alexandria)
  - Mark and Marcellian
  - Blessed Osanna of Mantua
  - June 18 (Eastern Orthodox liturgics)
- Foundation Day (Benguet)
- Human Rights Day (Azerbaijan)
- National Day (Seychelles)
- Queen Mother's Birthday (Cambodia)
- Waterloo Day (United Kingdom)
