= Daaga =

African man executed for mutiny (c. 1800 – 1837)

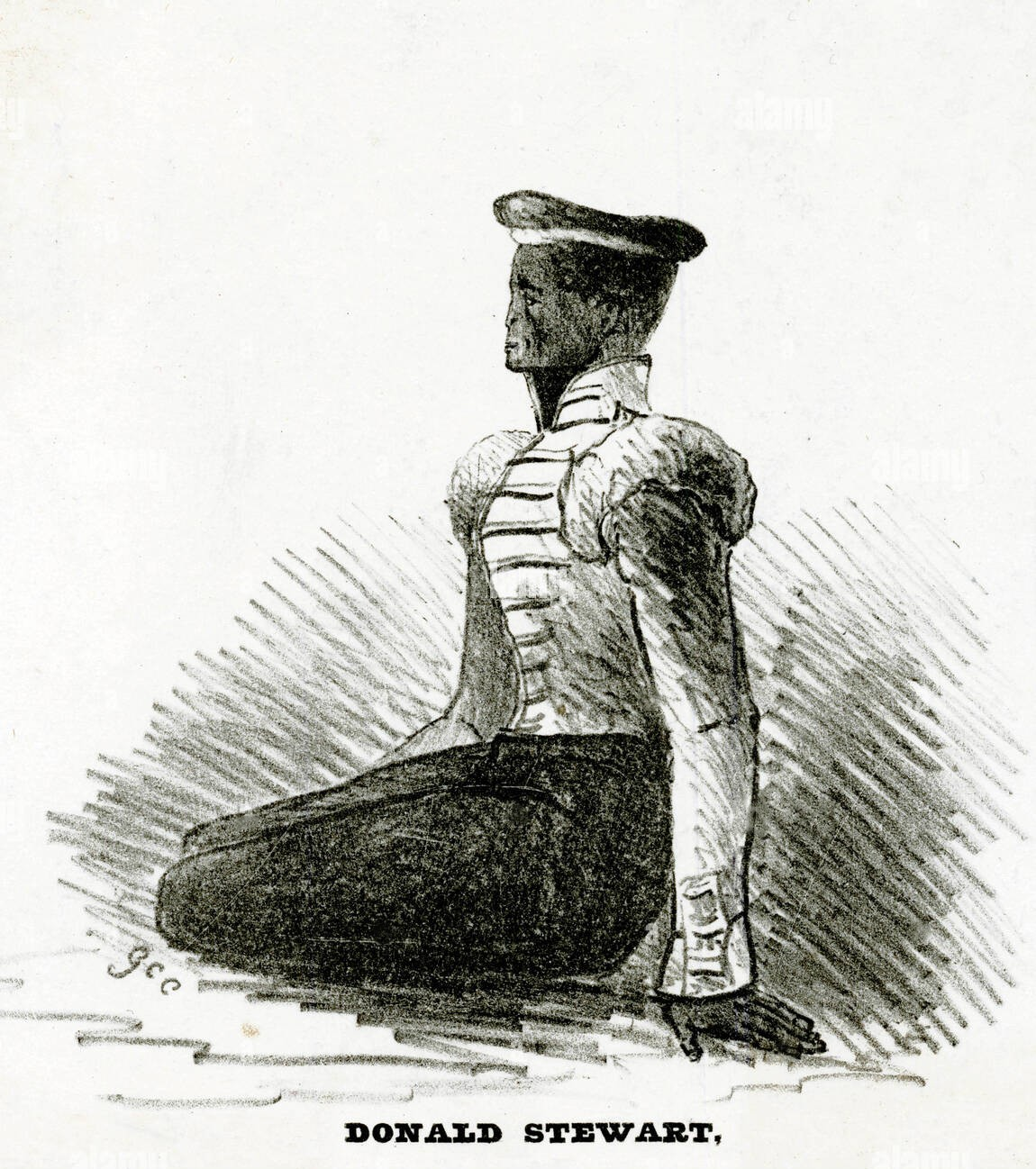
Undated depiction of Daaga (Donald Stewart) kneeling in preparation of his execution

Daaga (c. 1800 – 16 August 1837), also known as Donald Stewart, was an African man who was executed for his role in the St. Joseph Mutiny in the British colony of Trinidad in 1837.

Daaga was born on the Slave Coast of West Africa and may have been Gbe or Yoruba. According to his own account, he was the adopted son of a local king or chief and became a slave raider. In 1836, he was tricked into boarding a Portuguese slave ship bound for Spanish Cuba. After reaching the Caribbean the ship was seized by the Royal Navy's West Africa Squadron. The Africans were then offloaded at the colony of Grenada, where Daaga and 72 others were conscripted into the British Army's 1st West India Regiment.

After being moved to Trinidad, Daaga helped plan a mass escape from the regimental barracks, with the intent of finding freedom and possibly returning to Africa. He killed a fellow soldier during the escape and was captured shortly after by the colonial militia, although several others managed to evade capture for several days. Considered a ringleader of the revolt by British colonial authorities, Daaga was convicted of mutiny and murder at a court martial and executed by firing squad along two others. He became a folk hero among Trinidadians and was later a source of inspiration for the Black Power Revolution of the 1970s.

== Africa ==
=== Biographical sources ===
The primary source for Daaga's life prior to his arrival in Trinidad is an interview conducted by Edward Lanzer Joseph, a white journalist in Trinidad. The interview was conducted through an interpreter, Corporal Bone. Joseph in general believed that the mutineers had "legitimate grievances" and was critical of British rule in Trinidad, but was also "dismissive of black people" and racial prejudice is evident in much of his writing.

=== Origins and life in Africa ===
Dâaga was born along the Slave Coast of West Africa, probably in modern-day Benin or Togo. He was likely born between 1800 and 1805. Joseph recorded that Daaga identified himself as "the adopted son of Mudershee, an old and childless African king". He reportedly stood 6 feet 6 inches (198 cm) tall and may have been "adopted" out of slavery or pawnship by a king or chief for his physical prowess.

Daaga was identified contemporaneously as a Popo, a historical term for the Gbe-speaking peoples occupying the area around Grand Popo and Little Popo along the Bight of Benin. It has been suggested that Daaga means "tall man" in the Xwla language. The Popos were "middlemen in the slave trade, capturing and shipping into slavery thousands of their northern neighbours", primarily to Portuguese slavers involved in the Atlantic slave trade. Maureen Warner-Lewis assessed Daaga as a Popo or Gun, but noted that in Trinidad he used a Yoruba war song. Joseph recorded Daaga referring on a number of occasions to a deity transcribed as "Holloloo". Henderson (2009) interprets this as a reference to Olowu, the leader of the Owu subgroup of the Yoruba people, and speculates that Daaga may have been Yoruba himself rather than Popo.

Prior to his own capture, Daaga was a slave raider or trader who brought his captives to be sold to slave markets and factories on the coast. Saillant (2019) states that it is "likely that Daaga was his adoptive father's agent, procuring Yoruba captives and transporting them to one of the Portuguese-African markets for sale".

== West Indies ==
=== Capture ===
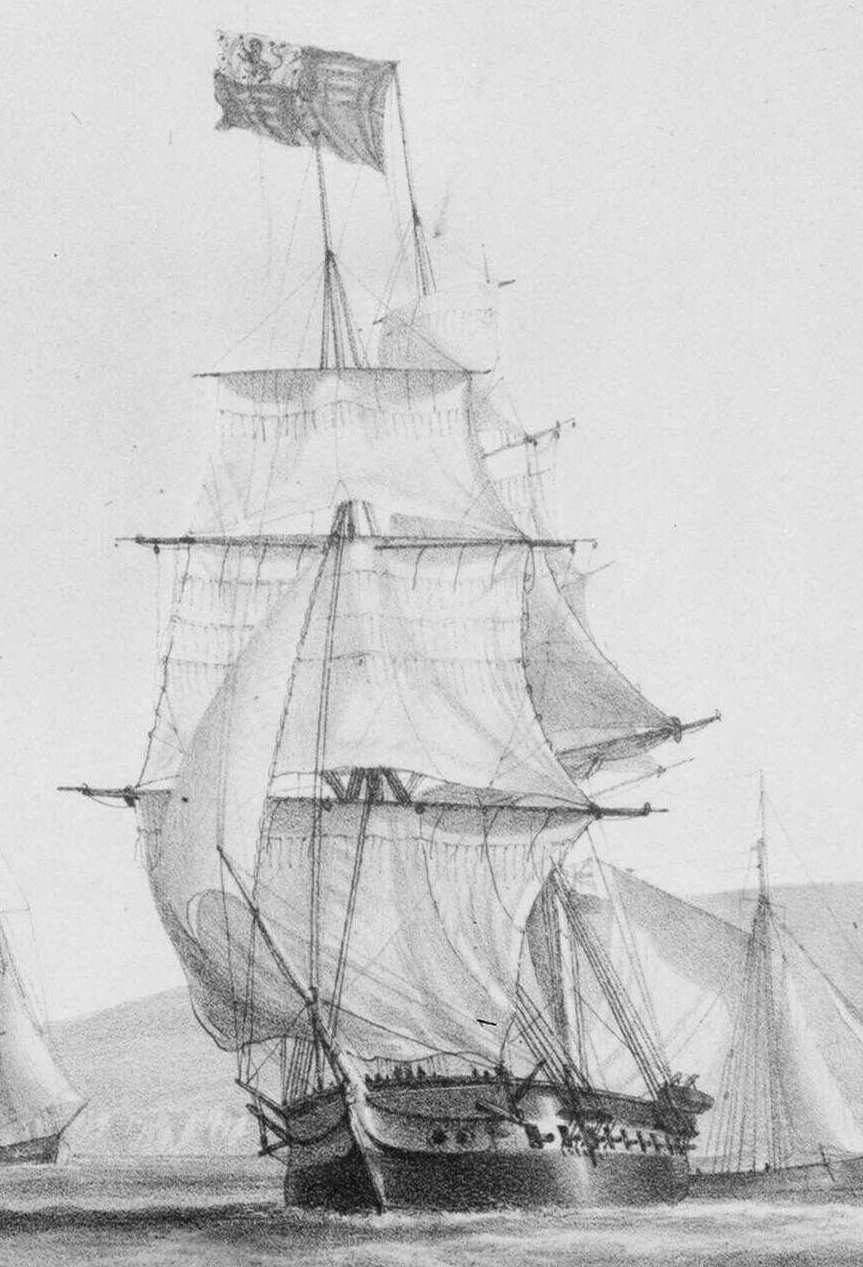
HMS Vestal, British frigate of the West Africa Squadron which captured Daaga aboard the slave ship Phoenix in 1836

In mid-1836, Daaga led an expedition into Yorubaland and captured several prisoners. He and his guards transported the prisoners to one of the slave ports to be sold to Portuguese slave merchants, but were instead lured aboard the ship and taken captive, a not uncommon fate for African slave traders.

Daaga was one of 480 Africans aboard the Portuguese-registered brigantine Phoenix when it was captured by the Royal Navy frigate HMS Vestal on 28 September 1836. Phoenix was bound for Spanish Cuba and its owner and captain Jose Antonio Barboza likely intended to offload the Africans as slaves in Havana, having made several previous trips between Africa and Cuba. He had registered Phoenix on the Portuguese island of Principe but had previously sailed under the Spanish flag. Vestal was part of the West Africa Squadron, established by the British government to suppress the Atlantic slave trade after the passage of the Slave Trade Act 1807.

Daaga and the other Africans aboard Phoenix were offloaded at Grenada in the British Windward Islands. They arrived during the ongoing emancipation of the British West Indies, where slaves had been notionally freed by the Slavery Abolition Act 1833 but until 1838 continued to work as forced labourers under the "apprenticeship" system. Under the terms of the Anglo-Portuguese treaty on slavery, Phoenix and the captured Africans were supposed to be returned to Africa to be assessed by the Mixed Commission Court in the British colony of Sierra Leone. However, William Jones, the captain of Vestal, chose to offload them in Grenada "to avoid subjecting them to the miseries which a second passage across the Atlantic in a crowded slave hold would have entailed upon them".

=== Military service and mutiny ===
On 6 October 1836, Daaga and 72 other Africans from Phoenix were conscripted into the British Army's 1st West India Regiment. Daaga was enlisted as a private under the name "Donald Stewart". He and several others from Phoenix were likely given the surname of James Stewart, the owner of a plantation on Grenada, in keeping with the local practice of removing African names and bestowing names of prominent white locals. Although they were paid an enlistment bounty and received soldier's wages, Daaga and the other Africans spoke little or no English and likely had little comprehension of what their enlistment entailed, including their relative lack of freedoms and duty to military authority.

Daaga helped plan the St. Joseph Mutiny in June 1837, alongside Edward Coffin, Maurice Ogston and William Satchell. The mutiny began when they broke into a regimental storeroom to seize a powder keg. An old Black soldier, Charles Dixon, attempted to stop them but was struck down by Mawee and then shot dead by Daaga with a musket. The leaders of the revolt were joined by around 180 African soldiers, who seized weapons and ammunition and then set fire to their huts.

Upon leaving the barracks, the mutineers separated into smaller groups. Daaga and six others made for the town of St. Joseph, where they were met by the colonial militia and fired upon. Daaga was captured by two militiamen while reloading his musket. Saillant (2019) has hypothesised that the mutineers were heading for Band de l'Est on the east coast of Trinidad (near present-day Manzanilla Beach), where they may have expected to find sympathetic treatment and possible assistance in sailing to Tobago or South America.

=== Trial and execution ===
Daaga was identified by British colonial authorities as one of the ringleaders of the revolt, although his actual role in its planning is unclear. Assumptions around his role were largely based on his physical size and prowess, with the Port of Spain Gazette remarking that "from personal appearance we should judge him to be just the kind of man whom savages would choose for a leader as they naturally selected chiefs with reference to corporeal strength and activity".

Acting as prosecutor, Bush charged Daaga with leading a mutiny, inciting arson and destruction of property, and murdering Dixon. Coffin, Ogston and Satchell were also charged with capital offences, while at Bush's request only one other mutineer was charged. Daaga's court martial was conducted through an interpreter, who apparently struggled to make Daaga understand the proceedings. Daaga did not offer any defence or call any witnesses, but rather apologised for his actions and requested that the court carry out its verdict immediately. Daaga and the four others were found guilty by the military court, with their sentencing to be determined by Samford Whittingham, the commander-in-chief at Barbados.

Daaga was executed by firing squad near the barracks on 16 August 1837, his death sentence having been confirmed by Whittingham two days earlier. According to Joseph, an eyewitness to the execution reported Daaga's last words to be: "The curse of Holloloo on white men! Do they think that Daaga fears to fix his eyeballs on death?". Daaga was executed alongside Coffin and Ogston, while Satchell had his sentence commuted to penal transportation but was later shot and killed while attempting to escape custody. After the executions, the other mutineers were made to parade past the bodies of the deceased.

== Legacy and analysis ==
The practice of enlisting captured Africans into the West India Regiments was subject to contemporary criticism and was subject to an inquiry by Leeward Islands governor-general William Colebrooke.

=== Commemoration ===
Daaga became a folk hero in Trinidad. American anthropologist Melville J. Herskovits visited Trinidad in the 1920s and reported that a week-long festival was dedicated to the memory of Daaga and the mutiny. Later in the 20th century, Daaga became an inspiration for the Black Power Revolution. Revolutionary leader Geddes Granger adopted the name Makandal Daaga to honour Daaga and Haitian rebel François Mackandal. Fictionalised versions of Daaga's life have also featured in calypso songs and Trinidadian author Earl Lovelace's 1996 novel Salt.

== Sources ==
- Henderson, Graeme (2009). Redemption of a Slave Ship: The James Matthews. Western Australian Museum. ISBN 9781920843991.
- Saillant, John (2019). "Dâaga the Rebel on Land and at Sea: An 1837 Mutiny in the First West India Regiment in Caribbean and Atlantic Contexts". The CLR James Journal. 25 (1/2): 165–194. doi:10.5840/clrjames20202767. S2CID 213407808.
- August, Thomas (1991). "Rebels with a cause: The St. Joseph Mutiny of 1837". Slavery & Abolition. 12 (2): 73–91. doi:10.1080/01440399108575034.
