= Makandal Daaga =

Trinidad and Tobago activist (1935–2016)

Makandal Akhenation Daaga ORTT (born Geddes Granger; 13 August 1935 – 8 August 2016) was a Trinidad and Tobago political activist and revolutionary. He was the leader of the 1970 Black Power Revolution. During the unrest he was arrested and charged.

He rallied against inequalities towards black citizens in Trinidad.

In February 1969, Granger founded the NJAC National Joint Action Committee.

In 2013 Daaga was awarded the Order of the Republic of Trinidad and Tobago (ORTT).

Daaga died on 8 August 2016.

== Early life and education ==
Geddes Granger was born in Laventille, Trinidad and Tobago. His father, Philip, was a barber and World War I veteran. Granger attended Belmont Intermediate School, and St. Mary's College before entering the University of the West Indies in St. Augustine in 1967 where he was elected president of the Guild of Students. He took the name "Makandal" from Haitian rebel François Mackandal and the name "Daaga" from one of the African leaders of the St. Joseph Mutiny against the British Army in 1837.

== NJAC and the February Revolution ==
In 1969, a group of West Indian students occupied the computer centre at Sir George Williams University in Montreal. Ten Trinidadian students were among those charged with arson, among other actions. Partly in response to these events in Canada, Granger founded the National Joint Action Committee together with Dave Darbeau (later known as Kafra Kambon), Carl Blackwood, Aiyegoro Ome, Kelshall Bodie and Russel Andalucio. In late 1969, protests organised by NJAC successfully prevented a planned visit by the Canadian Governor-General Roland Michener to the St. Augustine campus of the University of the West Indies.

A demonstration was organised by NJAC and other groups on 26 February 1970 in Port of Spain to mark the first anniversary of the Sir George Williams affair. In response to this, nine of the leaders of NJAC were arrested, including Granger. Their release on March 4 was marked with demonstrations by thousands of supporters. The following day, a peaceful protest in solidarity with the NJAC leaders was dispersed by the police, triggering violent protests and the attempted fire bombing of the home of a government minister.

Protests continued through March and intensified in April after Basil Davis, an NJAC member, was killed by the police on 6 April. Davis's funeral on 9 April drew 30,000 mourners. On 13 April, A. N. R. Robinson, a government minister and member of Parliament, resigned from the ruling People's National Movement in protest. On 21 April, the Prime Minister, Eric Williams, declared a state of emergency and arrested Granger and 14 other leaders of the Black Power movement.
