= Philip Rostant =

Trinidad and Tobago newspaper editor and social activist

- Born: Philippe Rostant; 1822
- Died: June 14, 1904 (aged 81–82)

Philip Rostant (1822–14 June 1904) was a Trinidad and Tobago newspaper editor and social activist.

== Early life and education ==
Rostant was born in 1822, the second son of Léon Toussaint Rostant, a wealthy Trinidadian planter of French descent, and Marie Louise d'Angleberne, the daughter of a French army officer who had settled in Martinique in 1793 during the French Revolution. Rostant was educated in Ireland and Paris, before returning to Trinidad.

== Early political career and exile ==
He left his father's estates and moved to Port of Spain where entered politics and was elected to the Port of Spain town council in 1848. In 1853 he was elected to the newly organised Port of Spain Borough Council. Having gone into debt to support his lifestyle, Rostant resigned from the council in 1855 after his father and brother agreed to provide security for his debts.

In 1862, to escape Léon Toussaint Rostant's creditors and the threat of imprisonment, the family fled first to Venezuela, and then to Puerto Rico. In 1866 they moved to Dominica before returning to Trinidad. Historian Anthony de Verteuil reports that Philip Rostant "apparently" returned to Trinidad in 1867.

== Newspapers and political reform ==
Between January 1881 and October 1884 Rostant served as editor of the Port of Spain Gazette. In 1883, while he was editor, the paper called for an expansion of the Legislative Council to include six members elected by large property owners, in addition to the mayors of Port of Spain and San Fernando as ex officio members.

In 1884 Rostant launched a rival paper, Public Opinion which was financed by Hypolite Borde. Rostant was editor of the paper until 1889 when it was sold to Joseph de la Sauvagère. After the sale of Public Opinion Rostant launched a new paper, Reform. Bridget Brereton also reports that he was involved with the San Fernando Gazette.

Despite his background, Brereton said that Rostant "stands out as the most radical political leader of the later years of the [nineteenth] century" and describes his hostility to British officialdom as "a kind of anti-colonialism".
