= Portuguese Trinidadians and Tobagonians =

Luso-Trinbagonians (in Portuguese: Trinitários e Tobaguenses portugueses)

Total population
- 837

Regions with significant populations
- Trinidad and Tobago

Languages
- Trinidadian and Tobagonian English · Portuguese

Religion
- Christianity (Roman Catholicism · Presbyterianism); Judaism

Related ethnic groups
- White Trinidadian and Tobagonian · Portuguese Guyanese · Portuguese Surinamese · Portuguese diaspora

Portuguese Trinidadians and Tobagonians are the descendants of emigrants from Portugal to Trinidad and Tobago. Between 1834 and 1846 about 2,000 Portuguese, especially from Madeira, immigrated to Trinidad and Tobago, with hundreds more coming in the 20th century up to 1975.

== History ==
Trinidad and Tobago saw four major waves of migration from Portugal.

Portuguese came to both Tobago and Trinidad as early as the 17th century: some landed in Trinidad in the 1630s. The groups that arrived in Tobago in the 1660s included Portuguese Jews. In fact, some of the Portuguese surnames found in Trinidad and Tobago are generally associated with the marrano community.

The emigration continued in the 19th century; some Portuguese landed in Trinidad in 1811 while others (mainly Azoreans and later Madeirans) arrived in 1834, following the British abolition of slavery the previous year. They were the first Portuguese-Caribbean labourers.

The second wave began in 1846. The historical background to this wave was the earlier influx of Azorean and Madeiran workers in 1834, along with Scottish Presbyterian evangelism in Madeira in the early 1840s. Seeking to resolve labour shortages in Trinidad, the British government signed a treaty with Portugal covering contract labour migration from Madeira to Trinidad, following which a group of 219 Madeiran contract workers arrived in May 1846, and then 773 more in the remainder of the year. Further migration, beginning in the 1870s, was spurred by a phylloxera infestation in Madeira.

As a result, the Madeiran community of Trinidad grew to roughly 2,000 by the end of the nineteenth century. The migrants comprised both Catholics and Protestants, though many of the Protestants moved to the United States or Brazil. In 1916, Henry de Nobriga was elected Mayor of Arima, the first public officer of Portuguese descent. In the 1920s and 1930s, and again after World War II, there were further influxes of Portuguese migrants. Migrants and their descendants formed two major ethnic associations, the Associação Portuguesa Primeiro de Dezembro (Portuguese Association, 1905) and the Portuguese Club (1927).

Portuguese migrants of the late 19th century occupied an intermediate social position: physically, they resembled the largely middle and upper-class migrants from other European countries, but in terms of socioeconomic status, they were closer to African descendants and Indian migrants of that era. As Miguel Vale de Almeida described it, "[n]either whites nor Blacks considered the Portuguese to be sociologically white" (see Bridget Brereton 1979:34). After 1960, exact statistics on the Portuguese community became unavailable because the census ceased to distinguish Portuguese as a separate group; they were thenceforth counted in the categories "Europeans", "Mixed", or "Others", until 2011 when they were included again in the national census.

Nowadays, the Portuguese language is increasingly learned by 3rd or 4th generation Portuguese descendants, mainly due to Trinidad & Tobago's economic ties with Brazil, as well as a renewed interest in discovering their origins.

== Notable people ==
- Mike Agostini, track and field athlete
- Stephen Ames, professional golfer
- Isabella Ribeiro de Cabral, pilot
- Dylan Carter, swimmer
- Pete de Freitas, drummer and producer
- Joshua da Silva, West Indies cricketer
- Sean de Silva, professional footballer
- Dennis De Souza, musician
- Jowelle de Souza, activist
- Richard de Souza, cricketer
- Geoffrey Ferreira, swimmer
- Roger Gibbon, cyclist
- Albert Maria Gomes, politician, trade unionist, and writer
- Larry Gomes, cricketer
- Gerry Gomez, cricketer
- Compton Gonsalves, cyclist
- Drew Gonsalves of Kobo Town, singer and songwriter
- Alfred Mendes, novelist and writer
- Sam Mendes, film and stage director, producer, and screenwriter
- Jolene Mendes, producer
- Gene Miles, political activist
- Debra O'Connor, badminton player
- Lisa O'Connor, artist
- Tina Pereira, ballet dancer and designer
- Gene Samuel, cyclist
- Gabrielle Walcott, artist, model, charity worker and beauty queen
