= White Trinidadians and Tobagonians =

White people of Trinidad and Tobago

Total population
- 8,669 (2011)

Languages
- Trinidadian English

Religion
- Anglicanism, Roman Catholicism, Presbyterianism, Evangelical Christianity, Irreligion

Related ethnic groups
- European Caribbeans, Portuguese Trinidadians and Tobagonians, English people, Scottish people, Welsh people, Irish people, French people, Germans, Portuguese people, Dutch people, Corsicans, Spaniards, Italians, Russians

White Trinidadians and Tobagonians (sometimes referred as Euro–Trinidadians and Tobagonians) are Trinidadians and Tobagonians of European descent. The term "local-white" is also used to refer more specifically to Trinidad and Tobago–born Europeans and, in particular, those who trace their roots back to Trinidad and Tobago's early settlers. White Trinidadians and Tobagonians account for less than one percent of the population of Trinidad and Tobago.

Most white Trinidadians and Tobagonians are of Portuguese descent. White Trinidadians are often referred to as French Creoles, even if are they are of non-French ancestry such as Spanish, British, Portuguese, or German descent.

== History ==
Before the arrival of Europeans, Trinidad and Tobago was mainly inhabited by various indigenous tribes such as Arawaks, the Caribs, and the Warao people who came to the island via South America. Christopher Columbus was the first European to set foot in the island. The British brought African slaves to Trinidad and Tobago.

The first Europeans to discover and settle in Trinidad and Tobago were the Spanish. Trinidad was originally a Spanish colony and was under Spanish rule until the British took hold of Trinidad in 1797. The French and the English later colonized the islands. The French arrived during Spanish colonization. Portuguese people were brought to replace freed African slaves. Europeans make up to 0.6 percent of Trinidad and Tobago's population. Many live in the suburbs of Port of Spain. Many Europeans in Trinidad and Tobago are of British, French, Italian, Spanish, Portuguese and German heritage.

A small population of Portuguese Jews arrived in Trinidad in 1850 to 1900. They primarily came from Venezuela, British Honduras (now present-day Belize), and Curaçao.

== Origins ==
Many white Trinidadians originate from the colonial era, in which English, Scottish, Welsh, Irish, French, Portuguese, Spanish, Dutch, German, and Corsican people filled the gap required to work as overseers on estates, farming sugarcane and cocoa, and to fill the gap required for labour on agricultural estates at the time.

== Notable European Trinidadians and Tobagonians ==
- Stephen Ames, golfer
- Ralph de Boissière, novelist
- George Bovell, swimmer
- Chris Birchall, footballer
- Cheese, live streamer, speedrunner and podcaster
- Arthur Andrew Cipriani, politician
- Danny Cipriani, rugby player (mixed race)
- Albert Gomes, unionist, politician and writer
- Justin Guillen, cricketer (mixed race)
- Edward Lanzer Joseph, journalist, playwright, poet, and author
- Stephen Hart, footballer and manager of Trinidad and Tobago national team
- Francesca Hawkins, filmmaker, news anchor
- David Jenkins, sprinter
- Andrew Lewis, sailor
- Rory McKenzie, footballer
- Andrea McLean, journalist
- Alfred Mendes, writer
- Sam Mendes, director
- Sean de Silva, footballer
- Jeff Stollmeyer, cricketer, senator, journalist, businessman
- Lowell Yerex, founder of BWIA
- Joshua Da Silva, West Indian and Trinidadian cricketer

== See also ==
- Portuguese Trinidadians and Tobagonians
- Cocoa panyols
