= Gene Miles (activist) =

Political activist from Trinidad and Tobago (1930-1972)

- Born: 1930
- Died: 8 December 1972 (approx. 42 years)
- Occupation: Political activist

Gene Miles (1930 - 8 December 1972) was a political activist from Trinidad and Tobago. She is recognized for her testimony in the 1967, Commission of Enquiry, into the corruption surrounding the granting of gas station licenses. Miles' testimony resulted in the firing of the Senior Factory Inspector. She is considered to be a figure of the resistance to governmental corruption and the Commission at which she testified is seen as one of the most significant in the history of Trinidad and Tobago. She was of Portuguese descent.

== Early life ==
Gene Miles was born in Port of Spain in 1930 to Ruby and Randolph Miles. In 1947 the family moved to Glencoe, a quiet, middle-class neighborhood on the North-Western Peninsula of Trinidad. Gene attended Sacred Heart primary school, before attending high school at St. Joseph's Convent, Port of Spain. After graduating from high school, Gene joined the civil service at the Ministry of Education and Culture. In 1962 she was transferred to the Ministry of Petroleum and Mines, and then to the Factory Inspectorate under the Labour Department as First-Class Clerk.

== Commission of Enquiry ==
The Commission of Enquiry into the Circumstances Surrounding the Sales, Leases and Other Transfers of Gasoline Stations or Sites for Gasoline Stations since 1961 and the Procedure Followed in the Granting of Licenses for the Operation of Such Stations was appointed on 23 June 1966. The Commission was headed by Mr. Justice Karl de la Bastide and tasked with investigating the sales and leases of gasoline stations.

During the period investigated by the Commission, BP Caribbean entered the Petroleum Marketing Industry of Trinidad and Tobago and the government contemplated stricter measures for the granting of licenses under Section 17 of the Petroleum Ordinance 26 No. 2. Additionally, a Senior Factory Inspector with sole discretion in the granting of station licenses was appointed. As a result, petroleum dealers, began to speculate in gasoline station sites. This speculation was heavily financed by petroleum marketing companies that could not plausibly recover their investment but enjoyed a generous tax deduction known as a "submarine well allowance" to offset the cost. As a result, the government incentives offered to encourage offshore oil production were being used to subsidize investment in unprofitable gasoline stations and station sites.

The Factory Inspectorate assumed responsibility for the administration of the Petroleum Ordinance 26 No. 2 in 1948. At the time of the expiration of licenses at the end of the calendar year, regulations required that applications, including a fee, be made to the Senior Factory Inspector. Between 1961 and 1963 there was an uncontrolled increase in the number of gasoline station licenses issued that resulted in the unsafe clustering of gasoline stations. During the same period the Senior Factory Inspector, Mr. Kenneth Tam, adopted a new policy of approving licenses by site rather than applicant name. As a result, several individuals applied for and received approval to operate on the same site. The new policy also did not require that applicant to hold legal titles to the site before applying.

=== Testimony ===
In her testimony to the Commission, Gene Miles used her position as a clerical officer to name and accuse senior officials in the Department of the Senior Factory Inspector of wrongdoing. According to her testimony, she had refused to show confidential documents to oil company officials, as instructed by her superiors. She alleged that she had overheard a conversation in which a woman asked the Chief Factory Inspector Kenneth Tam, if he had received the two documents and that he looked confused when he saw that she had heard. She claimed to have found discrepancies between the official plans for the gas station sites and the register of applications, suggesting corruption in the application process.

=== Report ===
According to the report Gene Miles, the Clerical Officer in the Department of the Senior Factory Inspector, testified that the senior inspector Kenneth Tam, had been dishonest in his practices. She claimed that as a result of her testimony, Tam had retaliated against her by giving her a poor confidential report, causing her annual increments to be withheld. The reprisals ultimately led to her transfer from the department. According to the Commissioner, Miles' allegations were not contradicted and appeared to be supported by Public Service Regulations. According to the Commission, Kenneth Tam admitted that his report might have contributed to the cessation of the increments. The Commission noted that these events occurred simultaneously the testimony Miss Miles’ testimony against Mr Tam and that her testimony has since been substantiated. The Commission also noted that another member of the department appeared to have been similarly victimized.

=== Aftermath ===
Shortly after the commission started sitting, Gene and her mother were robbed at gunpoint by two men but were not harmed; she was also alleged to have received abusive phone calls. Her personal campaign to have the report of the Commission published resulted in her becoming the subject of vicious slander. She was dismissed from the public service without benefits. According to Raffique Shah, Miles had been conducting an affair with a senior government official, stating that "not even her relationship with the notorious John O'Halloran could save her from the might of the PNM" and that she died "a virtual vagrant, pauperized and made an outcast by the same Williams who had attacked corruption with full force-before he came to power!" She began to drink and occasionally had to be carried home off the streets. She was eventually spent short periods in both a nursing home and mental hospital. Eventually, though not bed-ridden, she became very ill and was said to be suicidal. She died in her sleep of heart complications at age forty-two.

== Legacy ==
Miles has secured a place in the national lore of Trinidad and Tobago as a whistle-blower and a symbol of resistance. In 2011 she was the subject of a one-woman theatrical production entitled Gene Miles – the Woman of the World starring Cecilia Salazar. The play was authored and directed by playwright Tony Hall. It tells Miles’ life story while exploring contemporary themes of governance and corruption. The play also draws parallels between Gene and her father Ranny Miles, a Ministry of Works accountant who was instrumental in uncovering the Caura Dam Racket. Miles' name has become synonymous with anti-corruption efforts. More specifically, she is associated closely with those who have suffered character assassination, social ostracism, depression and death as a result of the stand they take against government level impropriety.

Her actions and legacy have been interpreted less favorably by others; during the attempted coup of 1990, insurrectionist Yasin Abu Bakr seized control of the national Trinidad and Tobago Television Station during the 7 P.M. newscast. During his (referring to Yasin Abu Bakra) speech he mentioned plans by then Prime Minister A.N.R. Robinson to immortalize Miles with a statue, as a primary impetus for the overthrow of the government.
