= Port of Spain Gazette =

Defunct newspaper in Trinidad and Tobago

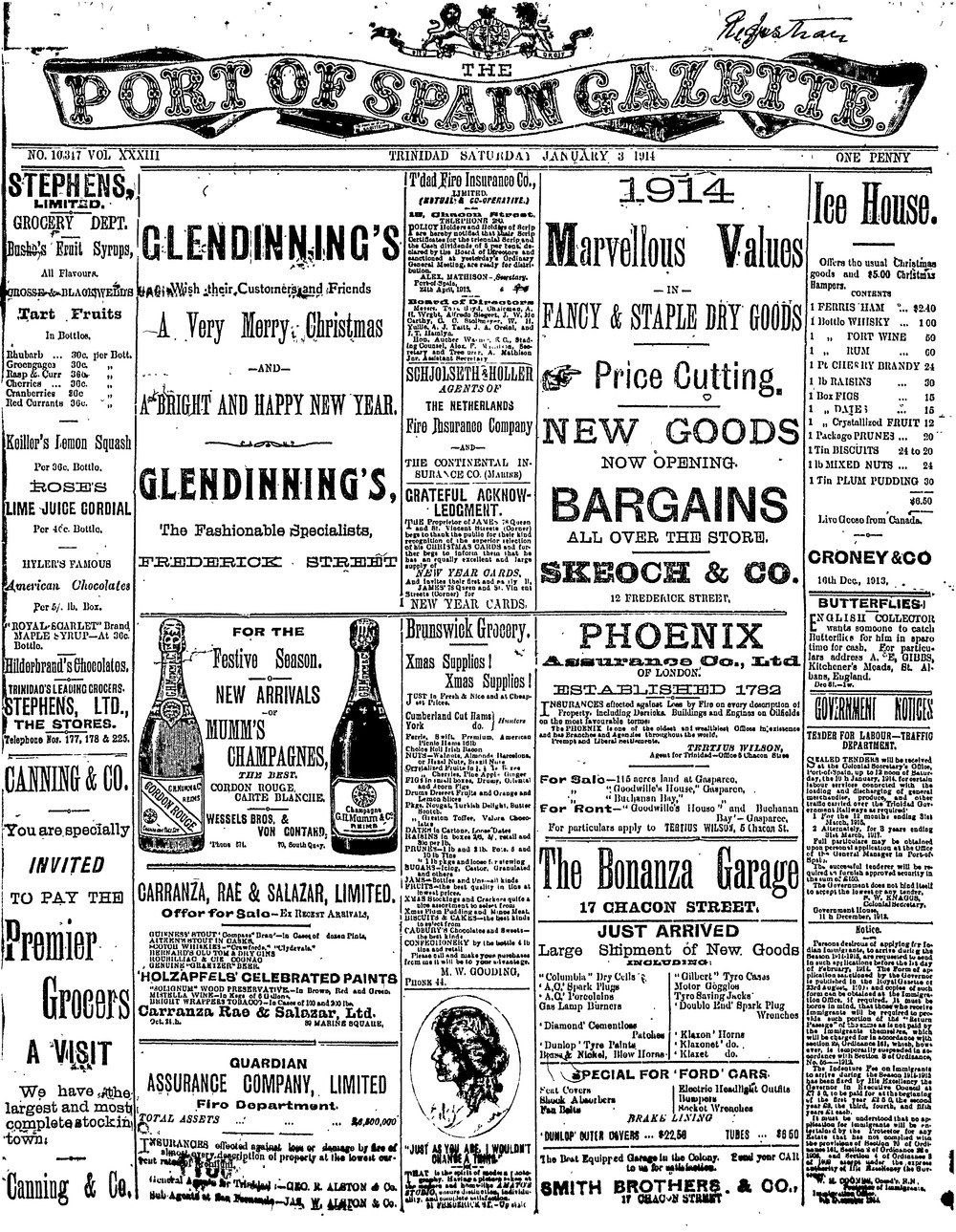
- First page of Port of Spain Gazette for 3 January 1914
- Founder: John Holman
- Publisher: John Holman and Company, T. R. N. Laughlin, A. P. T. Ambard, and others
- Editor-in-chief: Edward Lanza Joseph, Philip Rostant, A. P. T. Ambard, and others
- Founded: 21 September 1825 (succeeding The Trinidad Gazette)
- Ceased publication: 28 August 1959
- Language: English
- City: Port of Spain
- Country: Trinidad (later, Trinidad and Tobago)
- OCLC number: 456423442

The Port of Spain Gazette was a newspaper based in Port of Spain, Trinidad (and later, Trinidad and Tobago) between 1825 and 1959. The paper took a proslavery position in the 1830s, and later supported the rights of local elites against the Crown colony government. In the twentieth century the paper supported the government and opposed the labour movement.

For most of its existence, the paper was supportive of the French Creole elite and was seen as an unofficial voice for Roman Catholicism. In 1955, the paper was rebranded as the Trinidad Chronicle and Port of Spain Gazette, but after accumulating substantial losses it folded in 1959, ending its 134-year run.

== Background ==
On 14 September 1825 The Trinidad Gazette, the only newspaper in Trinidad, ceased publication after the publisher, William Lewer, fell out of favour with Governor Sir Ralph Woodford. Woodford cancelled the publisher's appointment as Government Printer. Unable to make money without a government contract, Lewer sold the paper's copyrights and business address to John Holman and Company, who launched the Port of Spain Gazette, and its printing presses to J. W. Irwin, who launched the Trinidad Guardian. (Note: This earlier Trinidad Guardian is distinct from the modern paper, which was launched in 1917.)

== History ==
The newspaper began publication on 21 September 1825 and carried government advertising and announcements, which provided it with financial stability until 1833 when this role was taken over by the Trinidad Royal Gazette (later renamed the Colonial Observer and Trinidad Gazette), a new paper launched in 1832 by Port of Spain grocer Young Anderson to represent the positions of antislavery activists.

Financial difficulties led Holman to partner with William Belk on 30 September 1829. A month later, the partnership was dissolved and the next two issues were produced by Belk as the sole publisher. On 14 November Belk announced the end of the Gazette, but the following week Holman resumed publication in partnership with English bookbinder H. J. Mills. Edward Lanza Joseph served as editor of the paper for an eight-month period ending in April 1838. Joseph resigned as editor after backlash triggered by his thinly-disguised portrayals of prominent members of the community in his novel Warner Arundell: The Adventures of a Creole.

Between 1875 and 1900, the Gazette was owned by T. R. N. Laughlin, a member of the French Creole elite of Irish descent. Between January 1881 and October 1884 Philip Rostant, a noted reformer, served as editor of the Gazette, before leaving to launch a rival paper, Public Opinion. In 1900, Laughlin sold the Gazette to businessman Lucien Ambard whose son, A. P. T. Ambard, served as editor. In 1944, A. P. T. Ambard sold the Gazette to "a private company", ending decades of control by the Ambard family. In 1955 the paper was sold to a consortium consisting of businessman George de Nobriga; Sir Harold Robinson, a "sugar baron"; Charles Bishe, director of Gordon Grant and Company; and Allan Storey. On 30 June 1956, the Gazette ceased publication under that name and was relaunched as the Trinidad Chronicle and Port of Spain Gazette. The purchasers in 1955 were reported by the Gleaner to be connected to the Democratic Labour Party and wanted to prevent the paper's closure because they reportedly felt that as capital of the West Indies Federation, Port of Spain should have more than one daily newspaper. Deeply in debt, and having lost substantial sums of money over the previous 15 years, the paper ceased publication entirely on 28 August 1959, ending its 134-year history and leaving the Trinidad Guardian the only daily newspaper in Trinidad and Tobago.

== Editorial stance ==
In the 1830s, the Port of Spain Gazette took a strongly proslavery position and "spat its venom on anyone who spoke of the virtues of emancipation". By standing up for the rights of the local elites against the Crown colony government the paper "set the tone for resistance" as early as 1834.

In 1882, the Gazette called for constitutional reform as a way to control government spending and taxation. In 1883, under the editorship of Rostant, it called for an expansion of the Legislative Council to include six members elected by large property owners, in addition to the mayors of Port of Spain and San Fernando as ex officio members. After Rostant's departure the paper took a more conservative approach to reform, calling instead for the establishment of a finance committee in the Legislative Council to discuss annual budgets before they were brought before the full council.

During the development of the labour movement in the 1930s the Port of Spain Gazette took a pro-government and anti-labour position, and was described as "representing the powerful French Creole planter class" during the second half of the 1930s. Commenting on the sale of the paper in 1955, the Jamaican Daily Gleaner described the Gazette as "the unofficial organ of Roman Catholicism in Trinidad", but said that with the sale "this policy was likely to undergo a drastic change" under its new ownership.

== Cultural impact ==
In Trinidadian Creole English, "gazette paper" is used as a term for newsprint, especially when newspapers are reused for wrapping or as toilet paper. The expression is a genericisation from the name of the Port of Spain Gazette.
