= General History of Latin America =

The General History of Latin America is part of UNESCO’s General and Regional Histories Collection. The publication seeks to contribute to mutual understanding and dialogue between cultures and civilizations. This series seeks to illustrate the encounters between cultures across history and their respective contributions to the general progress of humankind. This is done through the promotion of a pluralist vision of history.

The texts were posted online on the UNESCO website.

== Objectives and main themes ==
The General History of Latin America approaches the historical evolution of Latin America in order to capture both the unity and the diversity of the region, highlighting contributions made by Latin American societies (indigenous and others). Coordinated and directed by UNESCO and an International Scientific Committee consisting of 240 prominent researchers and scholars from all over the world, the outcome of this project has been the publication of nine volumes of comprehensive studies and information on ideas, civilizations, societies, and institutions covering the development of Latin American societies from the pre-Columbian era

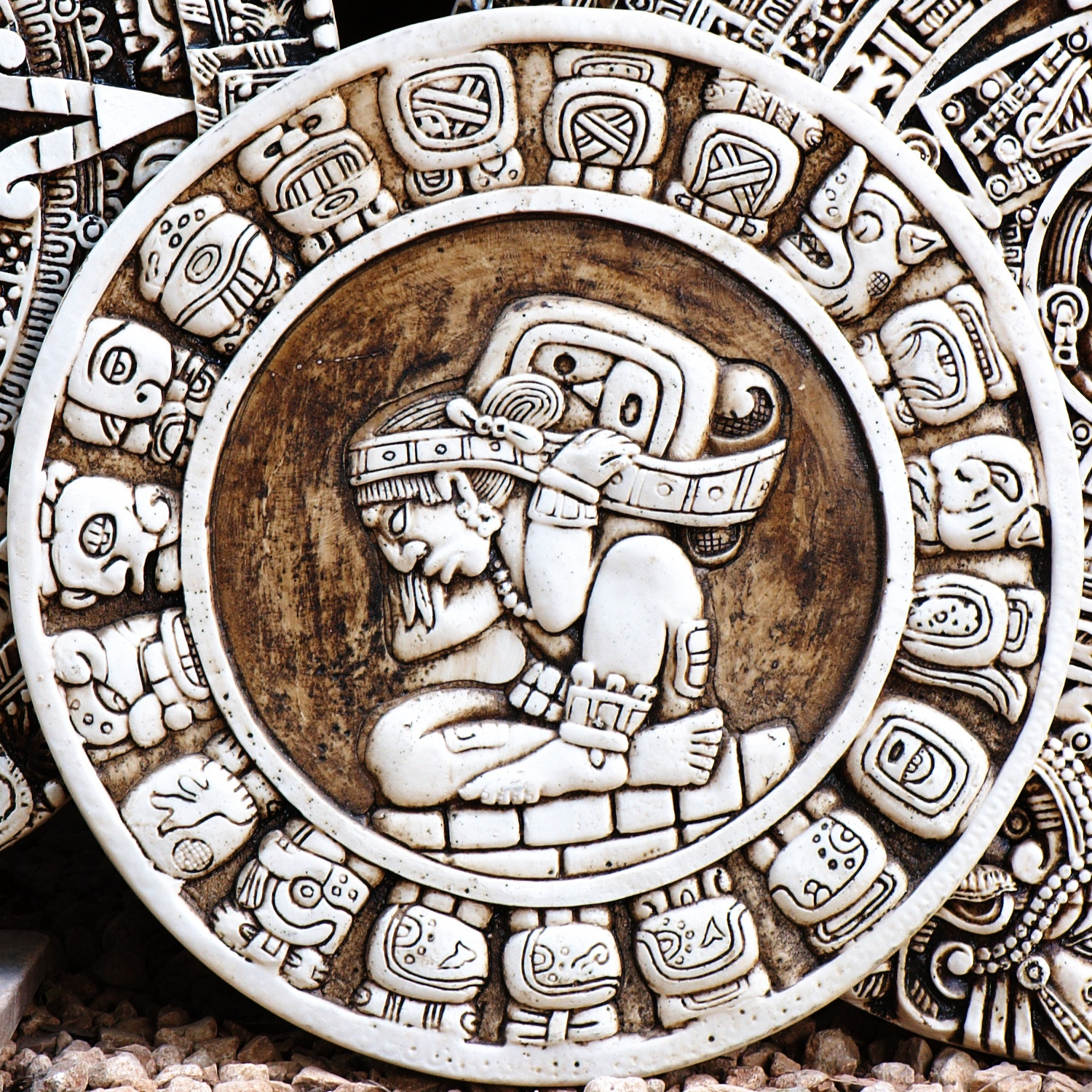
Mayan Zodiac Circle – Photo taken by Theilr via Wikimedia Commons

to the twentieth century. Using methodologies current in historiography, the project focuses on indigenous Latin American societies, their contacts with European culture, the colonial orders, and the participation of African communities in the region to highlight the history of inter-continental interactions in Latin America.

Published in Spanish and launched in 1983, the fundamental aim of the General History of Latin America, is to help heighten the historical awareness of the region.

== History ==
As a central part of its mandate, UNESCO is committed to promoting mutual understanding and to facilitating discussion and dialogue amongst peoples and nations. The General History of Latin America makes a significant contribution to this objective. This project was initially suggested in the recommendations of a meeting of experts convened by the Director-General of UNESCO in Lima, Peru, in 1967. In 1983 a Drafting Committee of 21 members (two-thirds of whom were specialists from Latin America) was established and the project was completed in 2009.

== Volumes ==
- Volume I: The Indigenous Societies (Las Sociedades Originarias)

Edited by Teresa Rojas Rabiela and John V. Murra

- Volume II: Early Contact and the Creation of New Societies (El Primer Contacto y la Formación de Nuevas Sociedades)

Edited by Franklin Pease, G.Y. and Frank Moya Pons

- Volume III: Consolidation of the Colonial Order (Consolidación del Orden Colonial)

Edited by Alfredo Castillero Calvo and Allan Kuethe

- Volume IV: American Processes Towards Colonial Redefinition (Procesos Americanos Hacia la Redefinición Colonial)

Edited by Enrique Tandeter and Jorge Hidalgo Lehuedé

- Volume V: The Structural Crisis in Societies (La Crisis Estructural de las Sociedades Implantadas)

Edited by Germán Carrera Damas and John V. Lombardi

- Volume VI: The Construction of the Latin American Nations (La Construcción de las Naciones Latinoamericanas)

Edited by Josefina Zoraida Vázquez and Manuel Miño Grijalva

- Volume VII: National Latin American Projects: Instruments and Articulation (1870–1930) (Los Proyectos Nacionales Latinoamericanos: Sus Instrumentos y Articulación (1870–1930))

Edited by Enrique Ayala Mora and Eduardo Posada Carbó

- Volume VIII: Latin America Since 1930 (América Latina Desde 1930)

Edited by Marco Palacios and Gregorio Weinberg

- Volume IX: Theory and Methodology in the History of Latin America (Teoraí y Detodología en la Historia de América Latina)

Edited by Estevão de Rezende Martins and Héctor Pérez Brignoli
