= Edward Lanzer Joseph =

Trinidad and Tobago writer (c. 1792–1838)

Edward Lanza Joseph (c. 1792 – 1838) was a Briton, who worked in the colony of Trinidad as a journalist, playwright and author. He was one of the first English-language poets in Trinidad, also writing in Trinidadian Creole. He briefly served as editor of the Port of Spain Gazette and published one of the first books on the history of Trinidad.

== Early life ==
Joseph was born to an Anglo-Jewish family in London in 1792 or 1793. He was educated in English and Hebrew, writing poetry, drama, essays and translations from a young age.

== Trinidad ==
Joseph left England in 1815 with a contingent of Londoners hoping to fight against the Spanish in the South American wars of independence. He instead settled in Trinidad after being warned by the island's governors against the prospects of the rebels. He found work as a slave overseer on sugar, coffee and cocoa plantations and later worked as a bailiff and debt collector.

=== Writing ===
In 1823, Joseph published his first poem, "Farewell Address on the Prospect of Leaving Trinidad", at a time when he was considering leaving Trinidad. He was published regularly in the Trinidad Gazette and Port of Spain Gazette and gained the epithet "Bard of Trinidad" as one of the first English-language poets in the colony.

He was the author of the novel Warner Arundell: The Adventures of a Creole, which was published in 1838. He also published History of Trinidad in 1838, one of the primary sources for the St. Joseph Mutiny of 1837 and its leader Daaga.

=== Plays ===
Joseph wrote, produced and translated plays while living in Trinidad that were performed in Port of Spain by a local amateur troupe known as the Brunswick Amateurs. In response to the annually recurring imposition of martial law from 1815 onwards by the Governor of Trinidad, Sir Ralph Woodford, Joseph wrote a musical farce in 1832 titled "Martial law in Trinidad; a musical farce in two acts.". It satirized the annual muster of militia troops each Christmas to squash the possibility of a local slave rebellion. The play was notable for its realistic portrayal of the local dialects, such as Trinidadian Creole, and of the African and Creole ethnic groups on the island.

=== Death ===
In 1838, Joseph died in Trinidad.

== Sources ==
- Saillant, John (2019). "Dâaga the Rebel on Land and at Sea: An 1837 Mutiny in the First West India Regiment in Caribbean and Atlantic Contexts". The CLR James Journal. 25 (1/2): 165–194. doi:10.5840/clrjames20202767.
