= Selwyn Ryan =

Trinidad and Tobago political scientist and pollster (1936–2022)

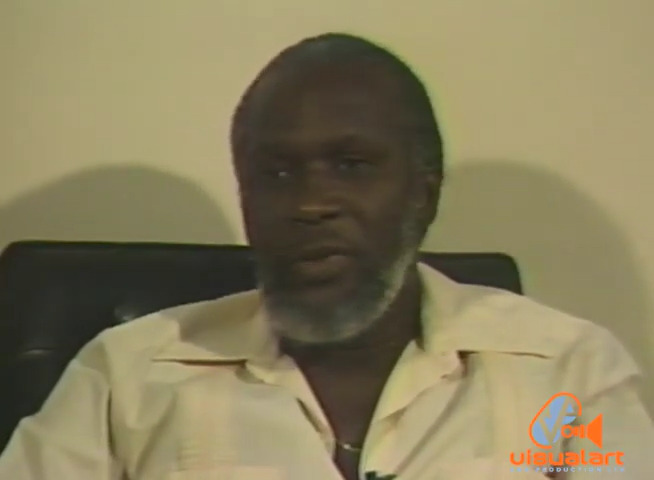
- Ryan at an interview in 1986
- Born: Selwyn Ryan; 1936; Princes Town, Trinidad
- Died: 12 March 2022 (aged 85–86)
- Education: Naparima College
- Alma mater: University of Toronto; Cornell University
- Occupation(s): Political scientist and pollster
- Notable work: Race and Nationalism in Trinidad and Tobago (1967); Eric Williams: The Myth and the Man (2009); Ryan Recalls – Selwyn Ryan: His Memoirs (2019)
- Awards: Chaconia Medal (Gold)

Selwyn Ryan (1936 – 12 March 2022) was a Trinidad and Tobago political scientist and pollster. Ryan has been described as "the author of record for the nation's modern political history" and "the most prolific and influential intellectual in post-colonial Trinidad". He was Professor Emeritus at the University of the West Indies, St Augustine campus.

== Early life and education ==
Ryan was born in Princes Town, Trinidad and Tobago, to a lower-middle-class Afro-Trinidadian family. He received his primary schooling at Ste Madeleine Government School and his secondary education at Naparima College in San Fernando. He graduated from Naparima College in 1954, after completing his Ordinary-Level examinations.

Ryan was motivated by Eric Williams to further his education. After hearing Williams deliver "My Relations with the Caribbean Commission" in 1955, Ryan attended all the addresses Williams delivered in San Fernando in the run-up to the 1956 general elections. His "Constitutional Reform in Trinidad and Tobago" inspired Ryan to study history and constitutional law. Ryan enrolled in the University of Toronto in 1956 from which he received a B.A. degree in history in 1960. Intending to go into politics, Ryan obtained a Ph.D. in political science from Cornell University in 1966. His dissertation, entitled The Transition to Nationhood in Trinidad and Tobago, focused primarily on Eric Williams and the rise of the People's National Movement.

== Career ==
After receiving his doctorate, Ryan taught at York University in Canada, the University of Ghana, and Makerere University in Uganda. In 1973, he took a position at the University of the West Indies, St. Augustine, where he remained until his retirement in 2003. Between 1976 and 1979, he served as chair of the Department of Government. In 1986, he was appointed Director of the Institute of Social and Economic Studies at the St. Augustine campus. After the institute was merged into the Sir Arthur Lewis Institute and Economic Studies, Ryan remained campus director until 2003.

Ryan authored 25 books, including Race and Nationalism in Trinidad and Tobago in 1967, Eric Williams: The Myth and the Man in 2009, and in 2019 Ryan Recalls – Selwyn Ryan: His Memoirs. He was awarded the Chaconia Medal (Gold) in 2012.

=== Newspaper columnist ===
Ryan was a regular newspaper columnist, and many of his scholarly publications began as columns in the Trinidad Express. He began writing for the Trinidad Guardian in 1972, and switched to the Express in April 1976, where he wrote a weekly column in the Sunday Express for 41 years.

=== Polling ===
Ryan is credited with establishing scientific polling in Trinidad and Tobago through the St Augustine Research Associates (SARA) polls (originally Ryan Polls), which he did in conjunction with the Trinidad and Tobago Express newspapers.

== Legacy ==
Historian Bridget Brereton described Ryan as "the author of record for the nation's modern political history" and the person who had done the most to "help the nation to learn about its modern history". Sociologist Anthony Maingot described Ryan as "the most prolific and influential intellectual in post-colonial Trinidad".
