= General History of the Caribbean =

The General History of the Caribbean is part of UNESCO’s General and Regional Histories Collection. The publication seeks to contribute to mutual understanding and dialogue between cultures and civilizations. This series seeks to illustrate the encounters between cultures across history and their respective contributions to the general progress of humankind. This is done through the promotion of a pluralist vision of history.

== Objectives and main themes ==
The Caribbean is understood to encompass the islands in the Caribbean sea and also the coastal part of South America, from Colombia to the Guyanas and the riverine zones of Central America. Despite the varieties of different languages and customs in this region, many cultural commonalities exist among the populations due to shared experiences and histories.

In an attempt to promote the preservation of cultural identities and greater understanding among peoples through intercultural dialogue and exchange, UNESCO has promoted and supported the exploration of the history of Caribbean peoples. The project brought together various scholars and researchers at universities and explores civilization, development, and culture in this region. The collection addresses indigenous communities, slave societies, the influx of settlement with people from Asia, and movements towards autonomy and independence.

The General History of the Caribbean is published in six volumes and seeks to provide an historical account of the area from the perspective of those who live there, highlighting the richness and diversity of these cultures. It seeks to integrate the historical experience of its peoples and societies from the earliest times to the present to highlight the common heritage and destiny of Creole populations and societies in the region. The collection highlights the population of the Caribbean not as an object of history, but rather actors of their own history.

The first and second volumes of the General History of the Caribbean begin with analyses and discussions of the indigenous peoples of the region, including hunter-gatherers as well as cultivators associated with the beginnings of village life – the first of the populations to be enslaved. The major struggles that occurred during this period as a result of excessive inhumanity and disease, are studied. The numbers of these populations significantly dwindled and in the eighteenth century, those resisting colonial powers were transported to the coast of Belize, where they established communities that continue to exist today.

Volume III of this history entitled The Slave Societies constitutes a central point of reference. In examining the creation of new societies, full account is taken of slavery, the terrible toll of human life and suffering it exacted and its pervasive impact on the psyche of the Caribbean people, both white and black. Resistance to slavery took many forms, of which marronnage in Haiti, Jamaica and Suriname, where the numbers were large, has received the most attention. Revolts and rebellions persisted throughout the region from the seventeenth century, although the best known is understandably that which led to Haiti's independence at the beginning of the nineteenth century. The abolition of the British slave trade left slavery itself intact, until it gradually succumbed in the decades of the nineteenth century, first to the creed of the French Revolution, then to the combination of slave rebellions in the islands and the determined protestations of humanitarians and free traders in Europe.

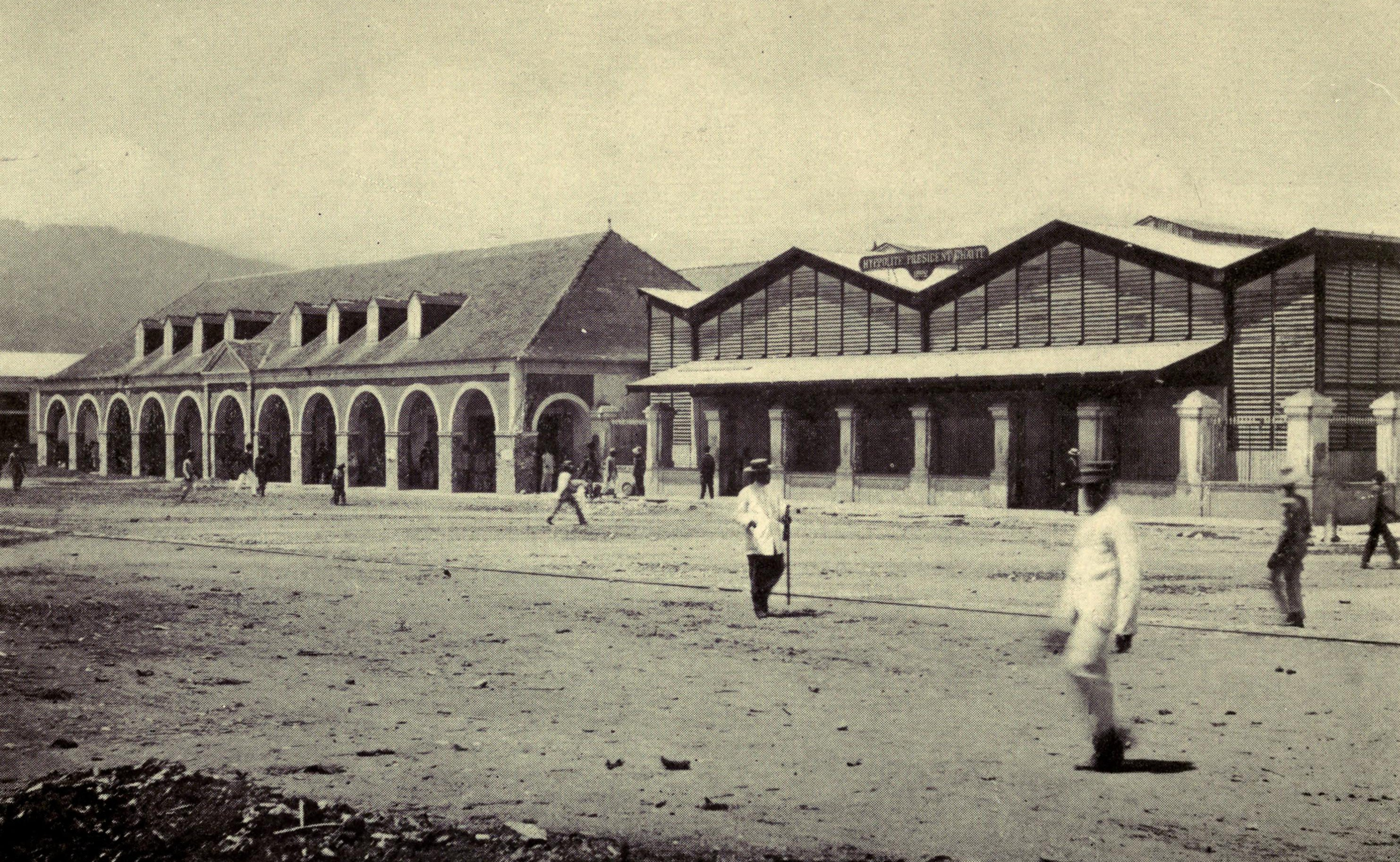
Custom House, Port-au-Prince, Haiti

By the middle of the nineteenth century, the disputes between estate owners and the emancipated field labourers, referred to in Volumes I and IV, opened the way for the influx of people from Asia, predominantly from India, thus adding a new element to the Creole societies which had gradually been formed since the sixteenth century. To avoid this supply of new labour for sugar estates becoming the restoration of slavery in a new guise, the recruitment of the labourers and their condition of work in the islands were regulated by law. Nevertheless, the constraints of indenture and the indignities attendant on being estate labourers affected the way in which Creole societies developed in the twentieth century. Undoubtedly, slavery and indenture have influenced the social and economic relations of societies in the circum-Caribbean in ways productive of ethnic and class conflict. Yet they have not only been the sources of cruelty and injustice, of acts remembered and resented. By persistent resistance to these oppressive regimes, these societies have also endowed themselves with the dignity and self-confidence of free people.

During the latter part of the nineteenth century, the impulse towards autonomy which was felt by some of the propertied and educated elites was frustrated by international, political and economic circumstances outside their control. The production of sugar from cane continued to dominate the Caribbean economies, with oil, minerals and tourism becoming important items in the twentieth century. The influx of American capital and the gradual diminution of European interests in the Caribbean led to the expansion of American influence in the region from the turn of the century onwards, notably in Cuba, Haiti and Santo Domingo. This was the context in which the movements for self-determination worked, complicated everywhere by racial prejudice and disparities in the ownership of property.

In the years following the Second World War, examined in Volume V, the islands and their immediate mainland neighbours have sought a variety of solutions to the problems which arise from societies asserting political autonomy while possessing economies dependent on overseas markets where their goods are protected from competition. Puerto Rico became the "Estado Libre", a Commonwealth; the French-speaking islands became departments of France; the Dutch-speaking islands, prior to the independence of Suriname, all became part of the Kingdom of the Netherlands; the British islands first flirted with a Federation, then became independent states separately; other states, following periods of military dictatorship, have pursued the path of socialist revolution. Currently, both in the islands and on the continent, there is a growing tendency for policy to be guided by regionalism, by the impulse towards association and co-operation, towards the formation of trading blocs, initially prompted by geographical propinquity.

== History of the project ==
The Working Group convened by the Director-General of UNESCO in Paris in 1981 to begin work on the project of writing a General History of the Caribbean – separately from the General History of Latin America. In conjunction with the Working Group and broad consultation carried out by the Regional Offices in Latin America and the Caribbean, a Drafting Committee was established by the Director-General. This Drafting Committee included 19 scholars and researchers from a range of places, two-thirds of whom were from the Caribbean, including Martinique, Santa Lucia, Trinidad and Tobago, Haiti, Barbados and Cuba. The six-volume history was officially launched in 1993 and is expected to be completed by the end of 2011.

== The volumes ==
- Volume I: Autochthonous Societies

Edited by Jalil Sued-Badillo

- Volume II: New Societies: The Caribbean in the Long Sixteenth Century

Edited by P. C. Emmer and German Carrera Damas

- Volume III: The Slave Societies of the Caribbean

Edited by Franklin W. Knight

- Volume IV: The Long Nineteenth Century: Nineteenth-Century Transformations

Edited by Jalil Sued-Badillo

- Volume V: The Caribbean in the Twentieth Century

Edited by Franklin W. Knight

- Volume VI: Methodology and Historiography of the Caribbean

Edited by B. W. Higman
