= Enrique Tandeter =

Argentine historian (1944–2004)

Noé Enrique Tandeter (1944 – 24 April 2004) was an Argentinian historian and author who studied colonial Latin America. He taught at various schools, including the Faculty of Philosophy and Letters, University of Buenos Aires.

== Education and career ==
Tandeter studied history at the University of Buenos Aires, graduating in 1969. He earnt his doctorate at the School for Advanced Studies in the Social Sciences in France. His thesis was on mining in the 18th and 19th centuries in Potosí, Bolivia. He left Argentina after the 1976 coup d'état, only returning in the 1980s. In 1992, Tandeter published Coercion and Market: Silver Mining in Colonial Potosi (Spanish: Coacción y mercado: la minería de la plata en el Potosí colonial, (1692-1826)). It and its subsequent English-language translation were given the Hebert Eugene Bolton Memorial Prize by the Conference on Latin American History in 1993 and the Premio Iberoamericano Book Award by the Latin American Studies Association in 1995.

In Argentina, Tandeter worked as a professor at the Faculty of Philosophy and Letters, University of Buenos Aires, where he also worked for the Ravignani Institute as the director of its Latin American history program, and as the director of the French-Argentinian Center of Higher Studies (Spanish: Centro Franco-Argentino de Altos Estudios). He worked as a visiting professor at the School for Advanced Studies in the Social Sciences in France, the University of London, the University of Chicago, the International University of Andalucía, and, from 1999 to 2000, was the Simón Bolívar Professor of Latin-American Studies at Cambridge.

He also worked as a principal investigator for National Scientific and Technical Research Council, a director at the General Archive of the Nation.

== Personal life ==
Noé Enrique Tandeter was born in 1944 in Buenos Aires, and died on 24 April 2004 at the age of 59. He was married to Dora Schwarzstein, and the couple had two children.

== Bibliography ==
- ————— (1992). Coacción y mercado: la minería de la plata en el Potosí colonial, 1692-1826) [Coercion and Market: Silver Mining in Colonial Potosi]. Centro de Estudios Regionales Andinos. OCLC 27080752.

=== Editor ===
- Larson, Brooke; Harris, Olivia; —————, eds. (1995). Ethnicity, Markets, and Migration in the Andes: At the Crossroads of History and Anthropology. Duke University Press. doi:10.1215/9780822379867. ISBN 978-0-8223-1633-6.
- —————; Lyman, Johnson, eds. (1995). Economias Coloniales: Precios y Salarios en America Latina, Siglo XVIII. Fondo de Cultura Económica.
- —————; Hidalgo Lehuedé, Jorge (eds.). General History of Latin America. Vol. 4: Procesos Americanos Hacia la Redefinición Colonial. UNESCO.
