= Rodney riots =

1968 civil unrest in Kingston, Jamaica

The Rodney riots were riots and civil disturbances in Kingston, Jamaica in October 1968.

The riots were sparked by the Jamaican government of Hugh Shearer banning Guyanese university lecturer Dr. Walter Rodney from returning to his teaching position at the University of the West Indies. Rodney, a historian of Africa had been active in the Black power movement, and had been sharply critical of the middle class in many Caribbean countries. Rodney was an avowed socialist who worked with the poor of Jamaica in an attempt to raise their political and cultural consciousness.

When Rodney attended a black writers' conference in Montreal, Quebec, Canada in October 1968 the government took the opportunity to ban him from returning, citing among other things trips to Cuba and the USSR as justification.

On learning of the ban, students at UWI, Mona began a demonstration under the leadership of the Guild of Undergraduates, closing down the campus. They then proceeded to march first to the prime minister's residence, and then to the parliament building in Kingston. On the way many more demonstrators joined in, and eventually the disturbance became increasingly violent spreading across the city. Eventually, several people were killed and there were millions of dollars in property damages.

The riots were part of an emerging black consciousness movement in the Caribbean, and helped inspire the 1970 Black Power Revolution in Trinidad and Tobago.

== See also ==
- Protests of 1968
- Black Power Revolution
