= 2010 Trinidadian local elections =

- 26 July 2010

All 14 Municipal Corporation Electoral Areas
Turnout
39.1% (▲1.2 pp)
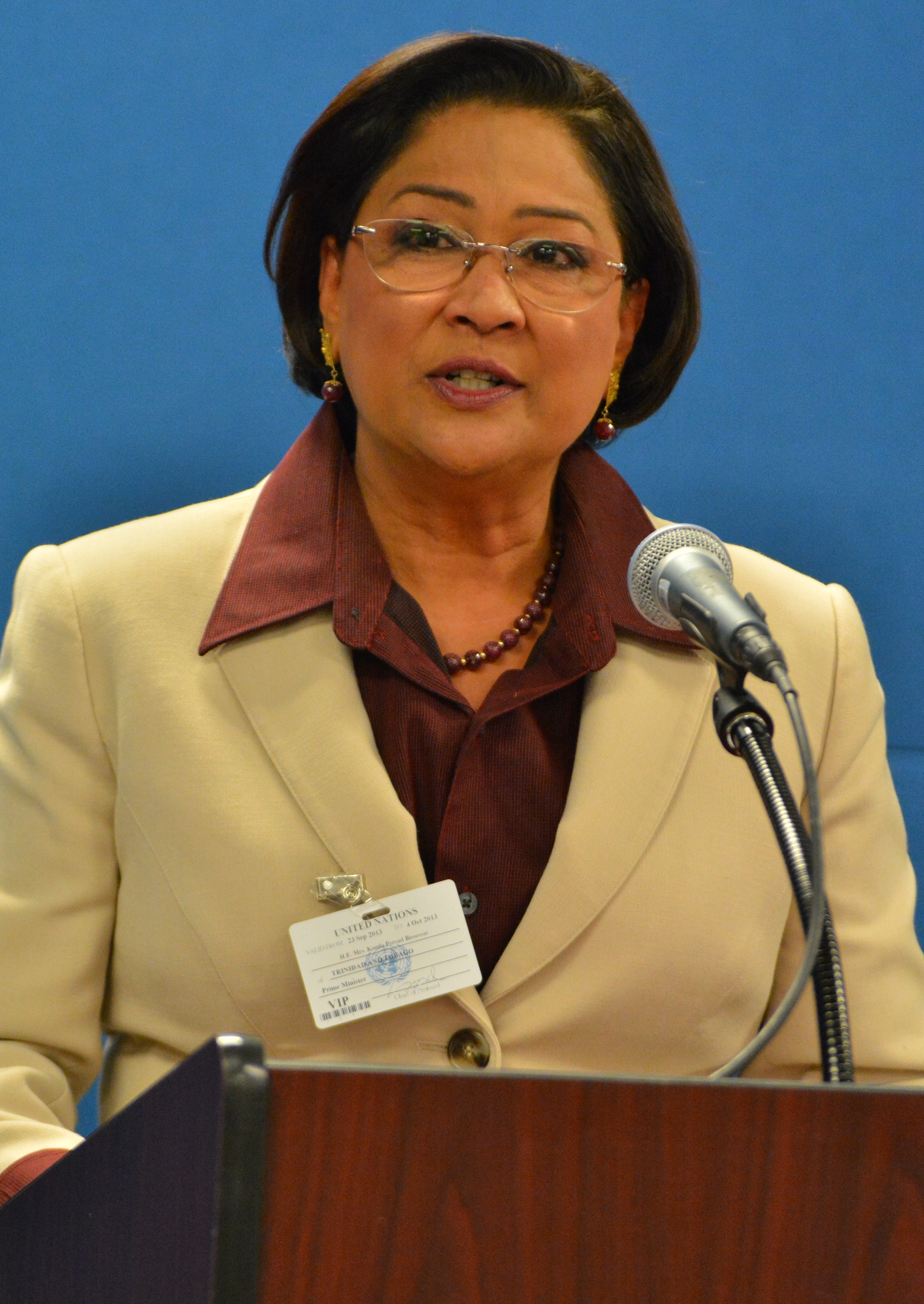

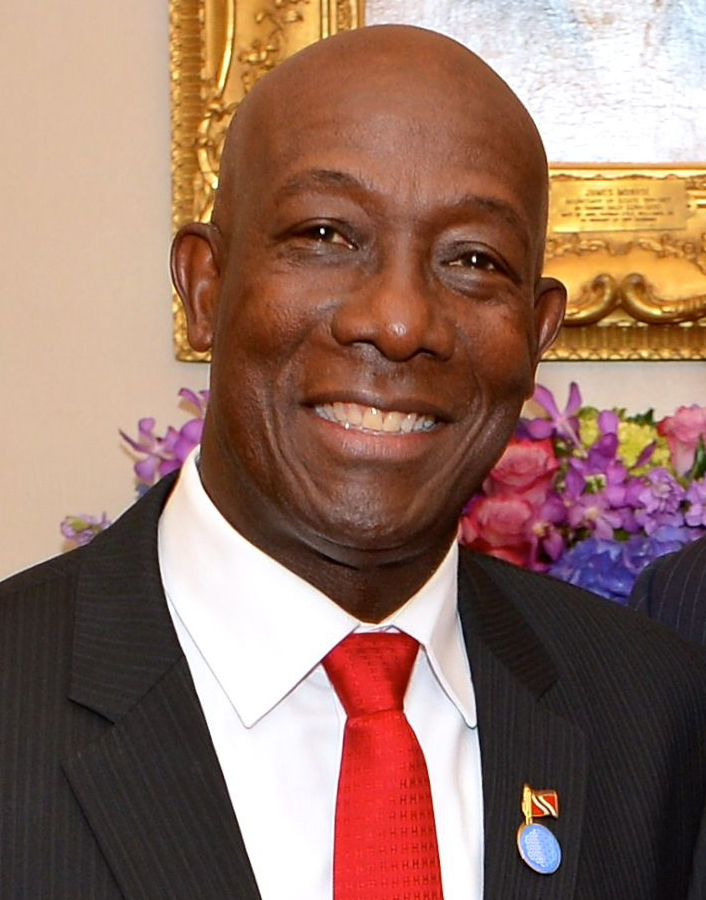

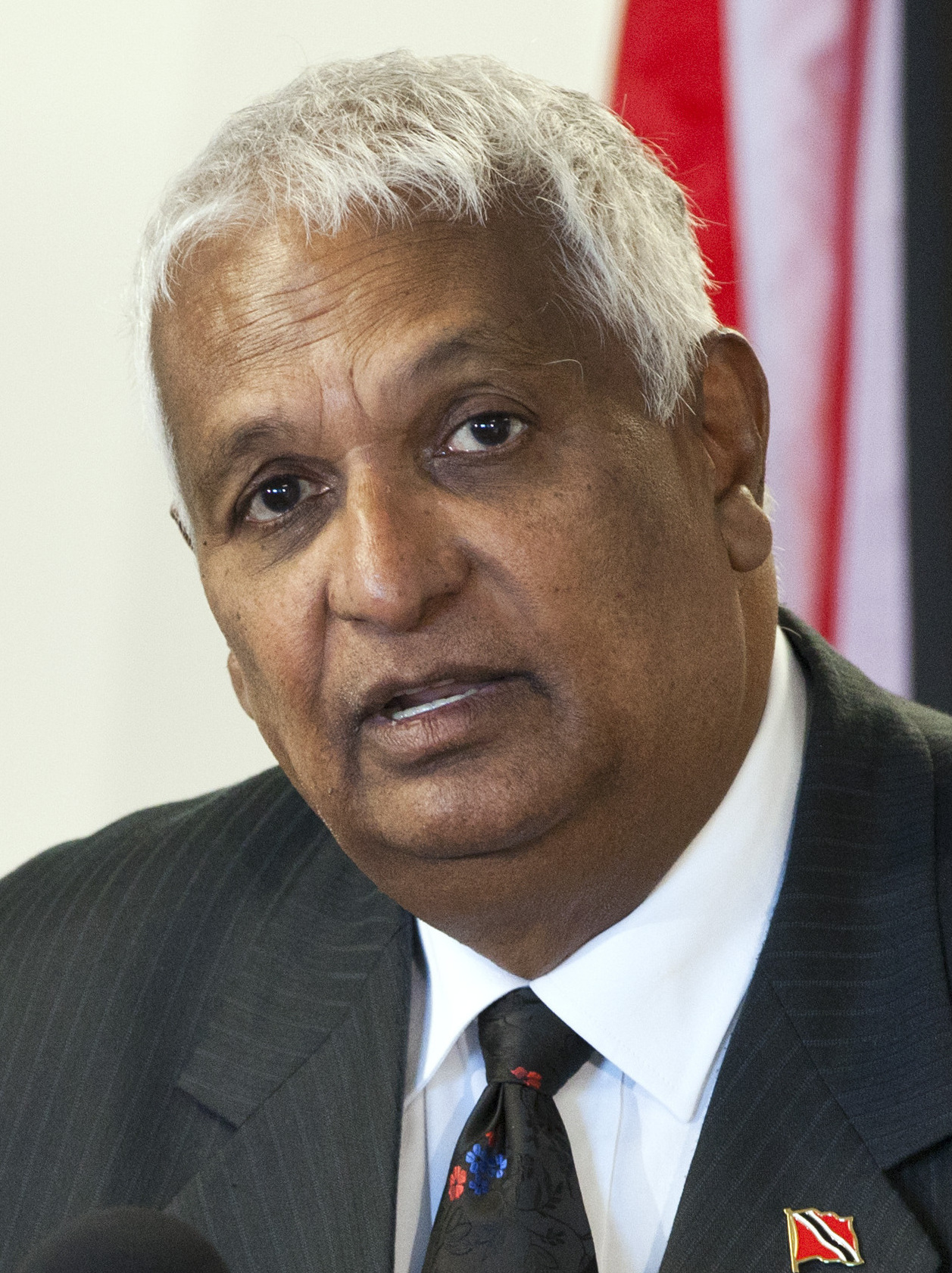
Leader	Kamla Persad-Bissesar	Keith Rowley	Winston Dookeran
Party	UNC	PNM	COP
Alliance	People's Partnership		People's Partnership
Leader since	24 January 2010	26 May 2010	10 September 2006
Last election	43 councillors, 45.66% 7 municipal corporations	83 councillors, 53.33% 7 municipal corporations	New party
Popular vote	202,380 52.02%	130,505 33.55%	54,473 14.00%
Swing	▲6.36%	▼19.78%	New party
Municipal Corporations	9 / 14	3 / 14	2 / 14
Municipal Corporations +/–	▲5	▼6	New party
Councillors	74 / 134	36 / 134	24 / 134
Councillors +/–	▲31	▼47	New party

At the ceremonial opening of the Tenth Republican Parliament on June 18, 2010, the Prime Minister Kamla Persad-Bissessar announced that the date for the 2010 Local Elections was to be on July 26, 2010.

== Regional Corporations ==
134 Local Areas were contested in 14 Corporations.

- Diego Martin Regional Corporation
- Port of Spain City Corporation
- San Juan–Laventille Regional Corporation
- Tunapuna–Piarco Regional Corporation
- Arima Borough Corporation
- Sangre Grande Regional Corporation
- Chaguanas Borough Corporation
- Couva–Tabaquite–Talparo Regional Corporation
- San Fernando City Corporation
- Princes Town Regional Corporation
- Penal–Debe Regional Corporation
- Siparia Regional Corporation
- Point Fortin Borough Corporation
- Rio Claro–Mayaro Regional Corporation

== Results ==
City of Port of Spain: (PNM)

- St James West— Robin Alexander Bynoe (UNC)
- St James East—Balliram Ramsuchit (COP)
- Woodbrook—Cleveland Phillip Garcia (COP)
- Northern Port of Spain—Keron Valentine (PNM)
- Belmont East—Darryl Rajpaul (PNM)
- Belmont North and West—Deanne Boucaud (PNM)
- Southern Port of Spain—Keisha Armstrong (COP)
- East Dry River—Isha Wells (PNM)
- St Ann's River South—Ashtine Thomason (PNM)
- St Ann's River Central—Natasha Young (PNM)
- St Ann's River North—Nedra Marisa McClean (PNM)
- Belmont South—Jennel Young (PNM)

City of San Fernando: (Partnership)

- Marabella West—Gloria Calliste (COP)
- Marabella East—Jason Williams (UNC)
- Marabella South/Vistabella—Gobin Persad Sinanan (COP)
- Pleasantville—Robert Parris (PNM)
- Cocoyea/Tarouba—Daren McLeod (UNC)
- Mon Repos/Navet—Shaka Joseph (PNM)
- Springvale/Paradise—John Mark Chankersingh (UNC)
- Les Efforts West/La Romaine—Anthony A Ramkissoon (UNC)
- Les Efforts East/Cipero—Navi Muradali (COP)

Borough of Arima: (Partnership)

- Calvary—Wayne John Bertrand (COP)
- Arima North East—Patricia T Cedeno-Metivier (COP)
- Arima West/O'Meara—Flora Singh (COP)
- Arima Central—Clinton Jennings (COP)
- Malabar North—Vedya Mahabir (COP)
- Malabar South—Anthony Garcia (PNM)
- Tumpuna—Hugo Ambrose Lewis (COP)

Borough of Point Fortin: (PNM)

- Techier/Guapo—Sherwin St Hillaire (PNM)
- Newlands/Mahaica—Janelle St Hilaire (PNM)
- Egypt—Abdon Mason (PNM)
- Cap-de-Ville/Fanny Village—Marilyn Ramnarinesingh (COP)
- Hollywood—Kennedy Kendel Richards (PNM)
- New Village—Kriscia Simon (PNM)

Borough of Chaguanas:(Partnership)

- Felicity/Endeavour—Orlando Nehru Nagessar (UNC)
- Edinburgh/Longdenville—Dwarka Singh (UNC)
- Montrose—Gopaul Boodhan (UNC)
- Cunupia—Renuka N Kangal (UNC)
- Enterprise North—Narsingh Rambarran (COP)
- Enterprise South—Ronald Heera (PNM)
- Charlieville—Falisha Isahak (UNC)
- Munroe Road/Caroni Savannah—Joey Samuel (UNC)

Regional Corporation of Couva/Tabaquite/Talparo:(Partnership)

- Chickland/Mamoral—Merle Mungroo (UNC)
- Freeport/Calcutta—Anil Baliram (UNC)
- St Mary's/Edinburgh—Sandra Ramsingh-Abdool (UNC)
- Felicity/Calcutta/McBean—Allan Seepersad (UNC)
- Perseverance/Waterloo—Annmarie Boodram (UNC)
- California/Pt Lisas—Christine Soobram (UNC)
- Balmain/Esperanza/Forres Park—Gangaram Gopaul (UNC)
- Claxton Bay/Pointe-a-Pierre—Camille Elie-Govind (UNC)
- Caratal/Tortuga—Suresh Pooran Maharaj (UNC)
- Gasparillo/Bonne Aventure—Feeraz Ali (UNC)
- Las Lomas/San Raphael—Dhanraj Saroop (UNC)
- Longdenville/Talparo—Rana Persad (UNC)
- Piparo/San Pedro/Tabaquite—Henry Awong (UNC)

Regional Corporation of Diego Martin: (Partnership)

- Chaguaramas/Point Cumana—Enroy Slater (PNM)
- Glencoe/Goodwood/La Puerta—Ricardo Garcia (COP)
- Covigne/Richplain—Katty Ann Christopher (PNM)
- Diamond Vale—Gail Donna La Touche (PNM)
- Bagatelle/Blue Basin—Lisa Maraj (UNC)
- St Lucien/Cameron Hill—Anne Letren (UNC)
- Moka/Boissiere No.2—Nadine Maria Romany (UNC)
- Morne Coco/Alyce Glen—Phillip Joseph Murray (UNC)
- Petit Valley/Cocorite—Wazim Daniel (UNC)
- Belle Vue/Boissiere No.1—Susan Rodriguez (UNC)

Regional Corporation of Mayaro/Rio Claro: (Partnership)

- Biche/Charuma—Glen Ram (UNC)
- Rio Claro South/Cat's Hill—Cyrilla Zola Cooper (UNC)
- Rio Claro North—Hazarie Ramdeen (UNC)
- Cocal/Mafeking—Keshrie Kissoon (UNC)
- Ecclesville—Shaffik Mohammed (UNC)
- Mayaro/Guayaguayare—Raymond Cozier (UNC)

Regional Corporation of Penal/Debe: (Partnership)

- Palmiste/Hermitage—Roland Hall (UNC)
- La Fortune—Amir J Junior B Saiphoo (UNC)
- Bronte—Brian N Julien (UNC)
- Debe East/L'Esperance/Union Hall—Marsha Jaimungal-Khan (UNC)
- Debe West—Skafte Awardy (UNC)
- Penal—Shanty Boodram (UNC)
- Barrackpore West—Premchand Sookoo (UNC)
- Rochard/Barrackpore East—Vishnu Ramlakhan (UNC)
- Quinam/Morne Diablo—Hyacinth Rampersadsingh (UNC)

Regional Corporation of Princes Town: (Partnership)

- Reform/Manahambre—Judy Barbara Hart (UNC)
- Ben Lomond/Hardbargain/Williamsville—Akash A Manickchand (UNC)
- Corinth/Cedar Hill—Winston D Chindra (UNC)
- Inverness/Princes Town—Deryck Mathura (UNC)
- New Grant/Tableland—Gowrie N Roopnarine (UNC)
- Hindustan/Indianwalk/St Mary's—Jules Vernon Downing (UNC)
- Lengua/St Julien—Alvin Lutchman (UNC)
- Fifth Company—Rafi Mohammed (UNC)
- Moruga—Phillip Gonzales (UNC)

Regional Corporation of San Juan/Laventille: (PNM)

- Maracas Bay/Santa Cruz/La Fillette—Lyndon Lara (PNM)
- Febeau/Bourg Mulatresse—Roger Charles Celestine (COP)
- Morvant—Franz Lambkin (PNM)
- Caledonia/Upper Malick—Jeffrey Anthony Reyes (PNM)
- St Ann's/Cascade/Mon Repos West—Kenrick Preudhomme (COP)
- St Barb's/Chinapoo—Jason C Alexander (PNM)
- Beetham/Picton—Akil Audain (PNM)
- Success/Trou Macaque—Joel Harding (PNM)
- Aranguez/Warner Village—Santam Ramjit (UNC)
- Barataria—Harrylal Persad (UNC)
- Petit Bourg/Mount Lambert/Champs Fleurs—Kion Williams (PNM)
- San Juan East—Nazeemool Mohammed (UNC)
- San Juan West—Kwesi Junior Antoine (PNM)

Regional Corporation of Sangre Grande: (Partnership)

- Toco/Fishing Pond—Martin Rondon (PNM)
- Valencia—Lawrence P Lalla (UNC)
- Manzanilla—Annand Soodeen (UNC)
- Sangre Grande South—Patricia Debbie A Harris (UNC)
- Vega De Oropouche—Ravi Lakhan (UNC)
- Sangre Grande North West—Dayne Evan Francois (UNC)
- Sangre Grande North East—Quincy Damian Luces (COP)
- Cumuto/Tamana—Nirmal Singh (UNC)

Regional Corporation of Siparia: (Partnership)

- Avocat/San Francique North—Rajwantee Bullock (UNC)
- Siparia East/San Francique South—Leo Christiani Doodnath (UNC)
- Siparia West/Fyzabad—Doodnath Mayrhoo (UNC)
- Otaheite/Rousillac—Chanardaye Ramadharsingh (UNC)
- Brighton/Vessigny—Gerald Debesette (PNM)
- Mon Desir—Balkaran Frank Ramjit (UNC)
- Cedros—Fitzroy Paul Beache (UNC)
- Erin—Morena M. Martin Frederick (PNM)
- Palo Seco—Christine Neptune (PNM)

Regional Corporation of Tunapuna/Piarco (Partnership)

- Maracas/Santa Magarita—Winston C Ramsaroop (COP)
- Auzonville/Tunapuna—Esmond Irving Forde (PNM)
- Curepe/Pasea—Rosanna Sookdeo (COP)
- Caura/Paradise/Tacarigua—Sookdeo P Barath (COP)
- Macoya/Trincity—Ria Boodoo (COP)
- Five Rivers/Lopinot—Dianne Bishop (UNC)
- Bon Air/Arouca/Cane Farm—Colin Kerwin Rodney (PNM)
- Valsayn/St Joseph—Graham Butcher (UNC)
- Kelly Village/Warrenville—Khublal Paltoo (UNC)
- St Augustine South/Piarco/St Helena—Khadijah Ameen (UNC)
- Mausica/Maloney—Steven Sam (PNM)
- La Florissante/Cleaver— Erwin Augustine Hope (COP)
- D'Abadie/Carapo—J-Lynn Roopnarine (UNC)
- Blanchisseuse/Santa Rosa—Andrew V Mooteram (COP)
- Wallerfield/La Horquetta—Brian Hayden Joseph (PNM)

== Nomination Day ==
Nomination day was July 5, 2010.
