= National Joint Action Committee =

- Abbreviation: NJAC
- Leader: Kwasi Mutema
- Founder: Makandal Daaga
- Founded: February 26, 1969; 56 years ago
- Ideology: Black nationalism Black Power; Black pride Afrocentrism; Pan-Africanism; Marxism
- Political coalition: People's Partnership (2010-2015)

The National Joint Action Committee (NJAC) is a political party in Trinidad and Tobago.

== History ==
The party was established in February 1969 by Makandal Daaga (then known as Geddes Granger), who was dissatisfied with the fact that most businesses in Trinidad at the time were owned by the white minority. The party first contested national elections in 1981, when it received 3.3% of the vote, but failed to win a seat. In the 1986 elections the party's vote share was reduced to 1.5% and it remained seatless. In the 1991 elections it received just 1.1% of the vote and again failed to win a seat.

The party was part of the victorious People's Partnership alliance for the 2010 general elections. In October 2013, the party contested the Point Fortin Regional Corporation in an alliance with the People's Partnership and lost all seats.
