= St. Joseph Mutiny =

1837 mutiny

Date	17–18 June 1837
Location	St. Joseph, Trinidad
Result	Mutiny suppressed

Belligerents
United Kingdom	Mutineers

Commanders and leaders
Samuel Ford Whittingham; George Hill	Daaga (Donald Stewart); Mawee (Maurice Ogston)

Units involved
89th Regiment of Foot; 1st West India Regiment; Trinidad Militia	Mutineers from the 1st West India Regiment

Strength
	60–100 mutineers

Casualties and losses
1 killed 1 wounded	12 killed 8+ wounded 6 committed suicide 3 executed

The St. Joseph Mutiny was a mutiny which occurred in June 1837 among the 1st West India Regiment of the British Army. It began at the unit's barracks in St. Joseph, Trinidad, then part of the British West Indies.

It was led by recently arrived Africans who had been liberated from illegal slave ships by the Royal Navy and subsequently conscripted into the West India Regiments. Between 60 and 100 soldiers in the regiment participated in the mutiny, seizing arms and ammunition, killing one enlisted soldier and setting fire to the officers' quarters. The Army and Trinidad Militia quickly suppressed the mutiny, killing twelve mutineers; six others committed suicide to avoid capture. Three ringleaders of the mutiny were subsequently executed, while two others were sentenced to death but had their sentences commuted to penal transportation to Australia.

One of the leaders of the mutiny, Daaga, became a folk hero in Trinidad and was an inspiration for the leaders of the Black Power Revolution in the 1960s.

== Background ==
The 1st West India Regiment was formed in 1795 under the auspices of British War Secretary Henry Dundas for service against the French in the Caribbean. It had been stationed in Trinidad since the British capture of the island in 1797. Original based on Chaguaramas and later in Orange Grove, the regiments had been based in St. Joseph since the 1830s, and was well regarded by local residents, despite fears expressed by white residents about armed Black soldiers.

Conscription into the regiment was indefinite. Discipline was strict and punishments were "horrendous" according to historian Kyle Prochnow, but were not unusual for the British army at the time.

== Bibliography ==
- August, Thomas (1991). "Rebels with a cause: The St. Joseph Mutiny of 1837". Slavery & Abolition. 12 (2): 73–91. doi:10.1080/01440399108575034.
- Saillant, John (2019). "Dâaga the Rebel on Land and at Sea: An 1837 Mutiny in the First West India Regiment in Caribbean and Atlantic Contexts". The CLR James Journal. 25 (1/2): 165–194. doi:10.5840/clrjames20202767. S2CID 213407808.
