= Germán Carrera Damas =

Venezuelan historian (born 1930)

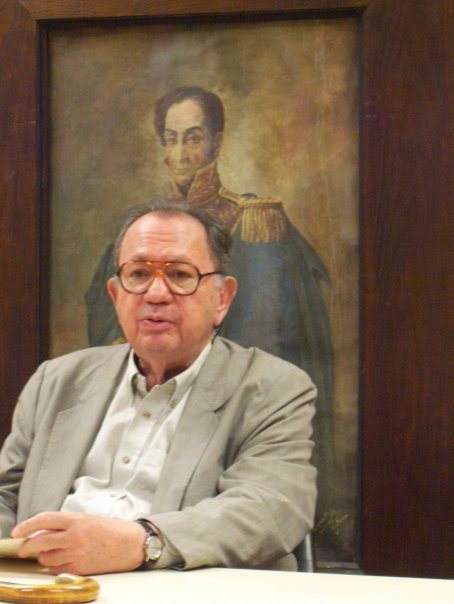
Germán Carrera Damas

Germán Carrera Damas (Cumaná, Sucre, 28 May 1930), is a Venezuelan historian, professor and retired ambassador, author of important works of Venezuela's historiography such as El Culto a Bolívar (1969) and Una nación llamada Venezuela (1980), among other works and essays.
