= Bridget Brereton =

Trinidad and Tobago historian (born 1946)

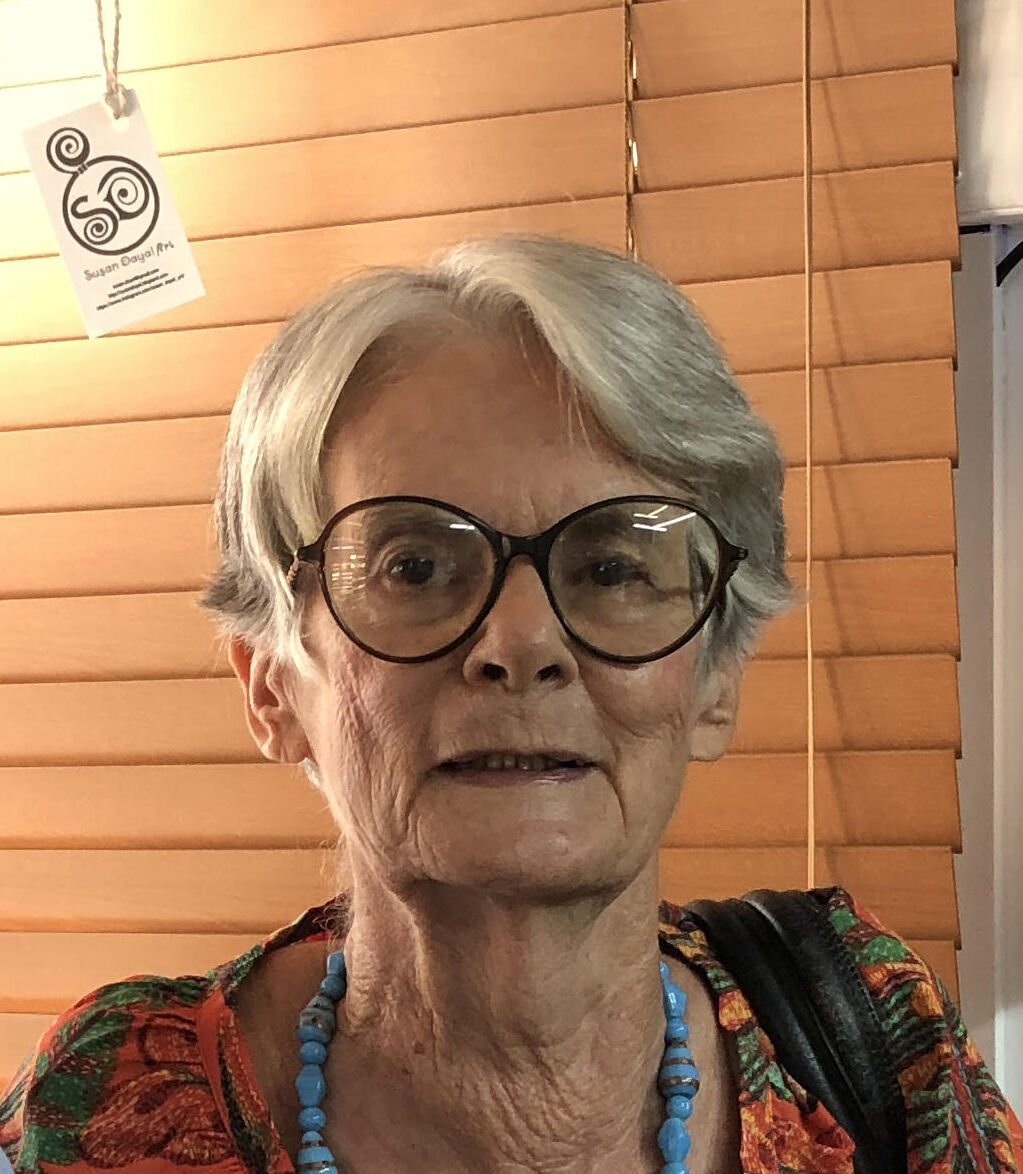
- Brereton in 2026
- Born: Bridget Mary Brereton; 1946 (age 79–80); Madras, India
- Education: University of the West Indies, Mona (BA Hons); University of Toronto (MA); University of the West Indies, St Augustine (PhD)
- Occupation: Historian
- Notable work: Race Relations in Colonial Trinidad, 1870–1900; A History of Modern Trinidad, 1783–1962; Law, Justice & Empire: The Colonial Career of John Gorrie, 1829–1892

Bridget Brereton (born 1946) is a Trinidad and Tobago-based historian, who is Emerita Professor of History at the University of the West Indies, St. Augustine. She is the author of works including A History of Modern Trinidad; Law, Justice and Empire: The Colonial Career of John Gorrie, 1829–1892; Race Relations in Colonial Trinidad, 1870–1900 and her articles have been widely published in journals and as book chapters. She edited Volume V of the UNESCO General History of the Caribbean: The Twentieth Century (2004), and has been co-editor of several other books.

== Biography ==
Bridget Mary Brereton was born in Madras, India, to Patrick and Hedda (née Friedlander) Cruttwell. Her father had been serving in the Indian Army during World War II, though as the war was over by the time she was born, her family returned to Britain when she was a baby and Brereton grew up in Scotland and England: she went to primary school in Edinburgh until the age of nine, after which she attended the Maynard School for Girls in Exeter, where she took her O-level and A-Level examinations.

She went to Jamaica at the age of 17, when her father took up a post as Professor of English at the University of the West Indies, Mona (UWI), and where she studied history and graduated with a first-class BA Honours degree at the age of 20. Marrying a fellow student from Trinidad and Tobago, she relocated there. She obtained an MA degree at the University of Toronto, and went on to become the first person to gain a PhD in a humanities or social sciences subject at UWI's St Augustine campus in Trinidad. A work she has cited as having been particularly influential in her development as a scholar is Trinidad in Transition: The Years after Slavery by British historian Donald Wood.

In 1972, she began teaching in the History Department at St Augustine, where by 1980 she was a senior lecturer, going on be Reader in Caribbean Social History by 1988, and becoming in 1995 the first female Professor of History at St Augustine.

Brereton was a university teacher for many years, holding positions variously as Head of the Department of History, Deputy Principal, and Interim Principal at UWI, St Augustine. She was the first woman to win the Vice-Chancellor’s Award for Excellence for Research, Teaching, and Administration (1996). She has additionally held many public-service roles, among them as former Chair of the Board of the National Library and Information System (NALIS). She has also served as a judge for prizes including the OCM Bocas Prize for Caribbean Literature.

== Selected works ==
- Race Relations in Colonial Trinidad, 1870–1900 (1979; Cambridge University Press, 2002, ISBN 978-0521523134)
- A History of Modern Trinidad, 1783–1962 (1989)
- Law, Justice And Empire: The Colonial Career Of John Gorrie 1829–1892 (The Press UWI biography series) (University Press of the West Indies, 1997, ISBN 978-9766400354)
- From Imperial College to the University of the West Indies: A History of the St Augustine Campus, T&T (Ian Randle, 2011)
- Islands at War - Trinidad a Tobago during World War II, with Karen E. Eccles (2019)
- History Matters - Selected Newspaper Columns, 2011–2021 (2022)
- Manning: Faith & Vision (2024)
