= Black power =

Political slogan and ideology

Black power is a political slogan and a name which is given to various associated ideologies which aim to achieve self-determination for black people. It is primarily, but not exclusively, used in the United States by black activists and other proponents of what the slogan entails. The black power movement was prominent in the late 1960s and early 1970s, emphasizing racial pride and the creation of black political and cultural institutions to nurture, promote and advance what was seen by proponents of the movement as being the collective interests and values of Black Americans.

The basis of black power is various ideologies that aim at achieving self-determination for black people in the U.S., dictating that black Americans create their own identities despite being subjected to pre-existing societal factors. "Black power" in its original political sense expresses a range of political goals, from militant self-defense against racial oppression to the establishment of social institutions and a self-sufficient economy, including black-owned bookstores, cooperatives, farms, and media. However, the movement has been criticized for alienating itself from the mainstream civil rights movement, and its support of black separatism.

== Etymology ==
The earliest known usage of the term "black power" is found in Richard Wright's 1954 book Black Power. On May 1, 1965, a few months after the February 21 assassination of Malcolm X, Grace Lee Boggs and James Boggs created "in our basement" the national Organization for Black Power, along "with former and then current members of the Revolutionary Action Movement (RAM) and SNCC among its members," including "representatives from Washington, D.C., Philadelphia, Chicago, Cleveland, and New York," as "a coordinating group of grassroots activists that looked to establish a concrete program for black self-determination centered in the cities." Already, "in the spring of 1964, together with Max Stanford of Revolutionary Action Movement (RAM); Baltimore Afro-American reporter William Worthy, and Patricia Robinson of Third World Press," the Boggses had "met with Malcolm in a Harlem luncheonette to discuss our proposal that he come to Detroit to help build the Organization for Black Power," but "Malcolm’s response was that we should go ahead while he served the movement as an 'evangelist.'"

New York politician Adam Clayton Powell Jr. used the term on May 29, 1966, during an address at Howard University: "To demand these God-given rights is to seek black power."

The first popular use of the term "black power" as a political and racial slogan was by Stokely Carmichael (later known as Kwame Ture) and Willie Ricks (later known as Mukasa Dada), both organizers and spokespersons for the Student Nonviolent Coordinating Committee (SNCC). On June 16, 1966, in a speech in Greenwood, Mississippi, after the shooting of James Meredith during the March Against Fear, Stokely Carmichael said:

This is the twenty-seventh time I have been arrested and I ain't going to jail no more! The only way we gonna stop them white men from whuppin' us is to take over. What we gonna start sayin' now is Black Power!

Stokely Carmichael saw the concept of "black power" as a means of solidarity between individuals within the movement. It was a replacement of the "Freedom Now!" slogan of Carmichael's contemporary, the non-violence leader Martin Luther King Jr. With his use of the term, Carmichael felt this movement was not just a movement for racial desegregation, but rather a movement to help end how American racism had weakened black people. He said, "'Black Power' means black people coming together to form a political force and either electing representatives or forcing their representatives to speak their needs." Carmichael and Charles V. Hamilton explain the term "black power" in their 1967 book Black Power: The Politics of Liberation: "It is a call for black people in this country to unite, to recognize their heritage, to build a sense of community. It is a call for black people to define their own goals, to lead their own organizations."

== Variants ==
Black power adherents believed in black autonomy, with a variety of tendencies such as black nationalism, black self-determination, and black separatism. Such positions caused friction with leaders of the mainstream Civil Rights Movement, and thus the two movements have sometimes been viewed as inherently antagonistic. Civil Rights leaders often proposed passive, non-violent tactics while the black power movement felt that, in the words of Stokely Carmichael and Charles V. Hamilton, "a 'non-violent' approach to civil rights is an approach black people cannot afford and a luxury white people do not deserve." However, many groups and individuals—including Rosa Parks, Robert F. Williams, Maya Angelou, Gloria Richardson, and Fay Bellamy Powell—participated in both civil rights and black power activism. A growing number of scholars conceive of the civil rights and black power movements as one interconnected Black Freedom Movement.

Numerous black power advocates were in favor of black self-determination due to the belief that black people must lead and run their own organizations. Stokely Carmichael is such an advocate and states that, "only black people can convey the revolutionary idea—and it is a revolutionary idea—that black people are able to do things themselves." However, this is not to say that black power advocates promoted racial segregation. Stokely Carmichael and Charles V. Hamilton write that "there is a definite, much-needed role that whites can play." They felt that whites could serve the movement by educating other white people.

Not all black power advocates were in favor of black separatism. While Stokely Carmichael and SNCC were in favor of separatism for a time in the late 1960s, organizations such as the Black Panther Party were not. Though the Panthers considered themselves to be at war with the prevailing white supremacist power structure, they were not at war with all whites, but rather with those (mostly white) individuals empowered by the injustices of the structure and responsible for its reproduction.

Bobby Seale, chairman and co-founder of the Black Panther Party for Self-Defense, was outspoken about this issue. His stance was that the oppression of black people was a result of economic exploitation. In his book Seize the Time, he states that "In our view it is a class struggle between the massive proletarian working class and the small, minority ruling class. Working-class people of all colors must unite against the exploitative, oppressive ruling class. So let me emphasize again—we believe our fight is a class struggle and not a race struggle." For Seale, the African-American struggle was not solely a struggle for black supremacy. In 1970, this contention fulfilled aims similar to those of the languishing Poor People's Campaign, as well as Jesse Jackson's Resurrection City and his later Rainbow/PUSH, the latter a counter to Hamptonian iterations of Rainbow Coalitions.

Offshoots of black power include African internationalism, pan-Africanism, black nationalism, and black supremacy.

== History ==
The term "black power" was used in a different sense in the 1850s by black leader Frederick Douglass as an alternative name for the Slave Power—that is, the disproportionate political power at the national level held by slave owners in the South. Douglass predicted: "The days of Black Power are numbered. Its course, indeed is onward. But with the swiftness of an arrow, it rushes to the tomb. While crushing its millions, it is also crushing itself. The sword of Retribution, suspended by a single hair, hangs over it. That sword must fall. Liberty must triumph."

In Apartheid Era South Africa, Nelson Mandela's African National Congress used the call-and-response chant "Amandla! (Power!)", "Ngawethu! (The power is ours!)" from the late 1950s onward.

The modern American concept emerged from the Civil Rights Movement in the early 1960s. Beginning in 1959, Robert F. Willams, president of the Monroe, North Carolina chapter of the NAACP, openly questioned the ideology of nonviolence and its domination of the movement's strategy. Williams was supported by prominent leaders such as Ella Baker and James Forman, and opposed by others, such as Roy Wilkins (the national NAACP chairman) and Martin Luther King Jr. In 1961, Maya Angelou, Leroi Jones, and Mae Mallory led a riotous (and widely covered) demonstration at the United Nations in order to protest against the assassination of Patrice Lumumba. Malcolm X, national representative of the Nation of Islam, also launched an extended critique of nonviolence and integrationism at this time. After seeing the increasing militancy of blacks in the wake of the 16th Street Baptist Church bombing, and wearying of Elijah Muhammad's domination of the Nation of Islam, Malcolm left that organization and engaged with the mainstream of the Civil Rights Movement. Malcolm was now open to voluntary racial integration as a long-term goal, but he still supported armed self-defense, self-reliance, and black nationalism; he became a simultaneous spokesman for the militant wing of the Civil Rights Movement and the non-separatist wing of the black power movement.

An early manifestation of black power in popular culture was the performances given by Nina Simone at Carnegie Hall in March 1964, and the album In Concert which resulted from them. Nina Simone mocked liberal nonviolence ("Go Limp"), and took a vengeful position toward white racists ("Mississippi Goddamn" and her adaptation of "Pirate Jenny"). Historian Ruth Feldstein writes that, "Contrary to the neat historical trajectories which suggest that black power came late in the decade and only after the 'successes' of earlier efforts, Simone's album makes clear that black power perspectives were already taking shape and circulating widely...in the early 1960s."

By 1966, most of SNCC's field staff, among them Stokely Carmichael (later Kwame Ture), were becoming critical of the nonviolent approach to confronting racism and inequality—articulated and promoted by Martin Luther King Jr., Roy Wilkins, and other moderates—and they rejected desegregation as a primary objective. King was critical of the black power movement, stating in an August 1967 speech to the SCLC: "Let us be dissatisfied until that day when nobody will shout 'White Power!'—when nobody will shout 'Black Power!'—but everybody will talk about God's power and human power." In his 1967 book, Where Do We Go from Here: Chaos or Community?, King stated:

In the final analysis the weakness of Black Power is its failure to see that the black man needs the white man and the white man needs the black man. However much we may try to romanticize the slogan, there is no separate black path to power and fulfillment that does not intersect white paths, and there is no separate white path to power and fulfillment, short of social disaster, that does not share that power with black aspirations for freedom and human dignity. We are bound together in a single garment of destiny. The language, the cultural patterns, the music, the material prosperity, and even the food of America are an amalgam of black and white.

SNCC's base of support was generally younger and more working-class than that of the other "Big Five" civil rights organizations and became increasingly more militant and outspoken over time. As a result, as the Civil Rights Movement progressed, increasingly radical, more militant voices came to the fore to aggressively challenge white hegemony. Increasing numbers of black youth, particularly, rejected their elders' moderate path of cooperation, racial integration and assimilation. They rejected the notion of appealing to the public's conscience and religious creeds and took the tack articulated by another black activist more than a century before, abolitionist Frederick Douglass, who wrote:

Those who profess to favor freedom, and yet depreciate agitation, are men who want crops without plowing up the ground. They want rain without thunder and lightning. They want the ocean without the awful roar of its many waters. ... Power concedes nothing without demand. It never did and it never will.

Most early 1960s civil rights leaders did not believe in physically violent retaliation. However, much of the African-American rank-and-file, especially those leaders with strong working-class ties, tended to complement nonviolent action with armed self-defense. For instance, prominent nonviolent activist Fred Shuttlesworth of the Southern Christian Leadership Conference (and a leader of the 1963 Birmingham campaign), had worked closely with an armed defense group that was led by Colonel Stone Johnson. As Alabama historian Frye Gaillard writes,

...these were the kind of men Fred Shuttlesworth admired, a mirror of the toughness he aspired to himself…They went armed [during the Freedom Rides], for it was one of the realities of the civil rights movement that however nonviolent it may have been at its heart, there was always a current of 'any means necessary,' as the black power advocates would say later on.

During the March Against Fear, there was a division between those aligned with Martin Luther King Jr. and those aligned with Carmichael, marked by their respective slogans, "Freedom Now" and "Black Power".

While King never endorsed the slogan, and in fact opposed the black power movement, his rhetoric sometimes came close to it. In his 1967 book Where Do We Go From Here?, King wrote that "power is not the white man's birthright; it will not be legislated for us and delivered in neat government packages."

=== "Crisis and Commitment Statement" ===
The "Crisis and Commitment Statement" was a full-page ad taken out in the New York Times on October 14, 1966. The ad was written and signed onto by Civil Rights leaders, condemning the "extreme" measures used by groups such as the black power movement, while reaffirming the basic tenets of the Civil Rights Movement. The statement was signed by Dorothy Height, A. Philip Randolph, Bayard Rustin, Roy Wilkins, Whitney Young, Amos T. Hall, and Hobson R. Reynolds.

== Impact ==
Although the concept remained imprecise and contested and the people who used the slogan ranged from business people who used it to push black capitalism to revolutionaries who sought an end to capitalism, the idea of black power exerted a significant influence. It helped organize scores of community self-help groups and institutions that did not depend on white people, encouraged colleges and universities to start black studies programs, mobilized black voters, and improved racial pride and self-esteem.

One of the most well-known and unexpected demonstrations for black power occurred at the 1968 Summer Olympics in Mexico City. At the conclusion of the 200m race, at the medal ceremony, United States gold medalist Tommie Smith and bronze medalist John Carlos wore Olympic Project for Human Rights badges and showed the raised fist (see 1968 Olympics Black Power salute) as the anthem played. Accompanying them was silver medalist Peter Norman, a white Australian sprinter, who also wore an OPHR badge to show his support for the two African Americans.

=== Black politics ===
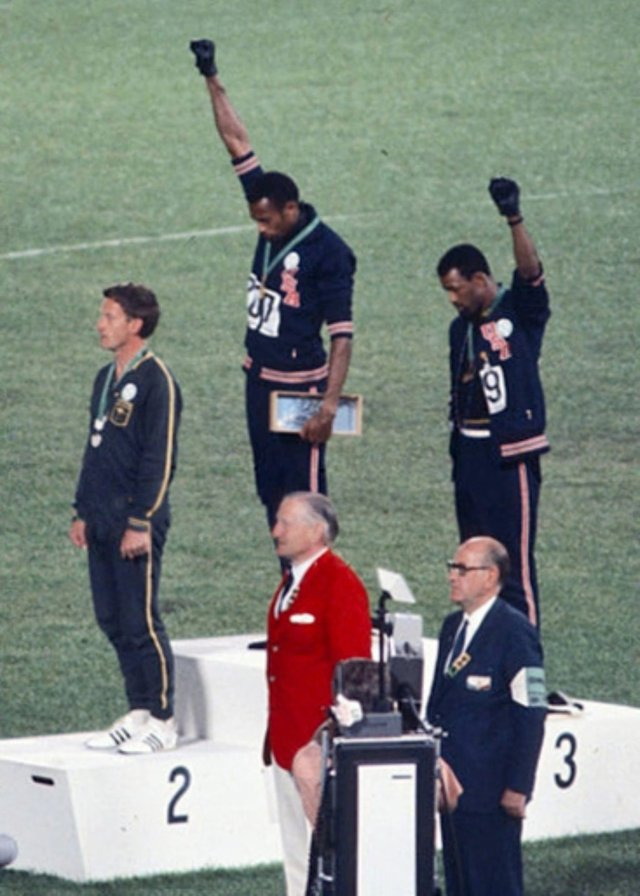
Tommie Smith and John Carlos showing the raised fist on the podium after the 200 m race at the 1968 Summer Olympics

Though the black power movement did not remedy the political problems faced by African Americans in the 1960s and 1970s, the movement did contribute to the development of black politics both directly and indirectly. As a contemporary of and successor to the Civil Rights Movement, the black power movement created, what sociologist Herbert H. Haines refers to as a "positive radical flank effect" on political affairs of the 1960s. Though the nature of the relationship between the Civil Rights Movement and the black power movement is contested, Haines' study of the relationship between black radicals and the mainstream civil rights movement indicates that black power generated a "crisis in American institutions which made the legislative agenda of 'polite, realistic, and businesslike' mainstream organizations" more appealing to politicians. In this way, it can be argued that the more strident and oppositional messages of the black power movement indirectly enhanced the bargaining position of more moderate activists.

Black power activists approached politics with vitality, variety, wit, and creativity that shaped the way future generations approached dealing with America's societal problems (McCartney 188). These activists capitalized on the nation's recent awareness of the political nature of oppression, a primary focus of the Civil Rights Movement, developing numerous political action caucuses and grass roots community associations to remedy the situation.

The National Black Political Convention, held March 10–12, 1972, was a significant milestone in black politics of the black power era. Held in Gary, Indiana, a city with a significant black population, the convention included a diverse group of black activists, although it completely excluded whites. The convention was criticized for its racial exclusivity by Roy Wilkins of the NAACP, a group that supported integration. The delegates created a National Black Political Agenda with stated goals including the election of a proportionate number of black representatives to Congress, community control of schools, national health insurance, etc. Though the convention did not result in any direct policy, the convention advanced goals of the black power movement and left participants buoyed by a spirit of possibility and themes of unity and self-determination. A concluding note to the convention, addressing its supposed idealism, read: "At every critical moment of our struggle in America we have had to press relentlessly against the limits of the 'realistic' to create new realities for the life of our people. This is our challenge at Gary and beyond, for a new Black politics demands new vision, new hope and new definitions of the possible. Our time has come. These things are necessary. All things are possible." Though such political activism may not have resulted in direct policy, they provided political models for later movements, advanced a pro-black political agenda, and brought sensitive issues to the forefront of American politics. In its confrontational and often oppositional nature, the black power movement started a debate within the black community and America as a nation over issues of racial progress, citizenship, and democracy, namely "the nature of American society and the place of the African American in it." The continued intensity of debate over these same social and political issues is a tribute to the impact of the black power movement in arousing the political awareness and passions of citizens.

Some have compared the modern movement Black Lives Matter to the black power movement, noting its similarities. The Movement for Black Lives openly promotes black power.

=== Other minorities ===
Though the aims of the black power movement were racially specific, much of the movement's impact has been its influence on the development and strategies of later political and social movements. By igniting and sustaining debate on the nature of American society, the black power movement created what other multiracial and minority groups interpreted to be a viable template for the overall restructuring of society. By opening up discussion on issues of democracy and equality, the black power movement paved the way for a diverse plurality of social justice movements, including black feminism, environmental movements, affirmative action, and gay and lesbian rights. Central to these movements were the issues of identity politics and structural inequality, features emerging from the black power movement. Because the black power movement emphasized and explored a black identity, movement activists were forced to confront issues of gender and class as well. Many activists in the black power movement became active in related movements. This is seen in the case of the "second wave" of women's rights activism, a movement supported and orchestrated to a certain degree by women working from within the coalition ranks of the black power movement. The boundaries between social movements became increasingly unclear at the end of the 1960s and into the 1970s; where the black power movement ends and where these other social movements begin is often unclear. "It is pertinent to note that as the movement expanded the variables of gender, class, and only compounded issues of strategy and methodology in black protest thought."

=== African-American identity ===
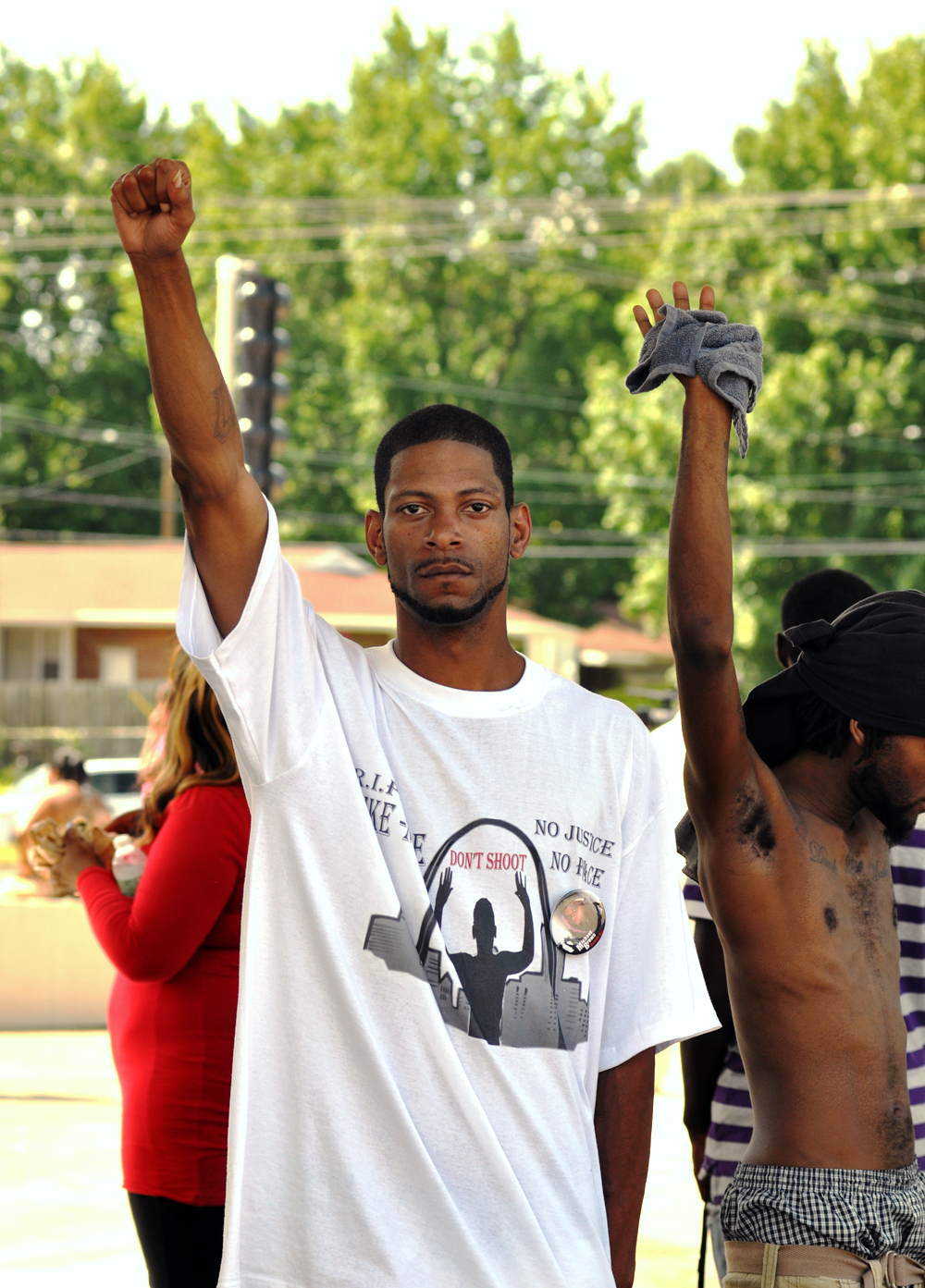
Protester raises his fist in black power salute, Ferguson, Missouri, 15 August 2014

Due to the negative and militant reputation of such auxiliaries as that of the Black Panther Party, many people felt that this movement of "insurrection" would soon serve to cause discord and disharmony through the entire U.S. Even Stokely Carmichael stated, "When you talk of Black Power, you talk of building a movement that will smash everything Western civilization has created." Though black power at the most basic level refers to a political movement, the psychological and cultural messages of the black power movement, though less tangible, have had perhaps a longer-lasting impact on American society than concrete political changes. Indeed, "fixation on the 'political' hinders appreciation of the movement's cultural manifestations and unnecessarily obscures black culture's role in promoting the psychological well being of the Afro-American people," states William L. Van Deburg, author of A New Day in Babylon, "movement leaders never were as successful in winning power for the people as they were in convincing people that they had sufficient power within themselves to escape 'the prison of self-deprecation'". Primarily, the liberation and empowerment experienced by African Americans occurred in the psychological realm. The movement uplifted the black community as a whole by cultivating feelings of racial solidarity and positive self-identity, often in opposition to the world of white Americans, a world that had physically and psychologically oppressed black people for generations. Stokely Carmichael stated that "the goal of black self-determination and black self-identity—Black Power—is recognition of the virtues in themselves as black people." Through the movement, blacks came to understand themselves and their culture by exploring and debating the question, "who are we?" in order to establish a unified and viable identity. And "if black people are to know themselves as a vibrant, valiant people, they must know their roots."

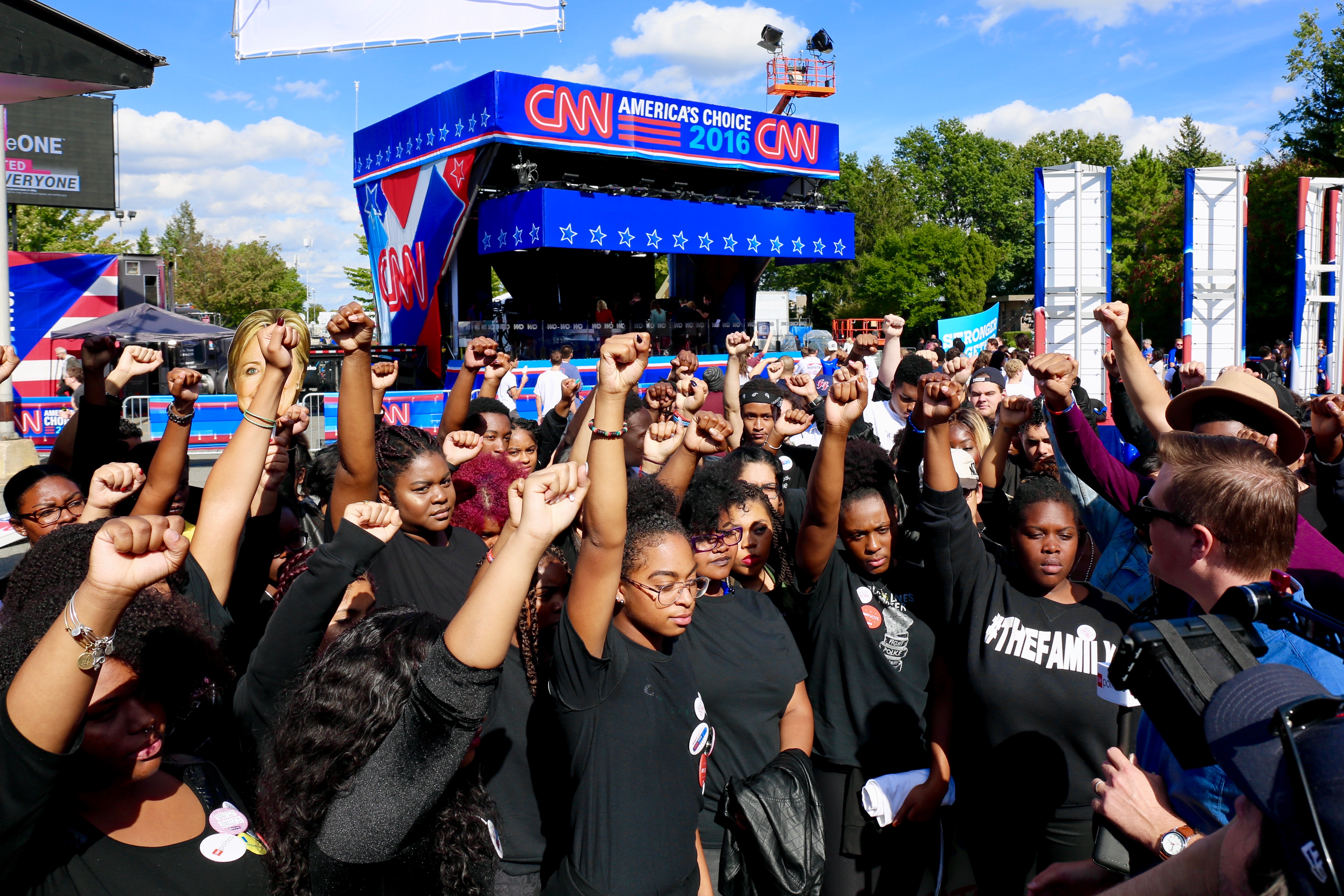
Black Lives Matter protest in September 2016

Throughout the Civil Rights Movement and black history, there has been tension between those wishing to minimize and maximize racial difference. W.E.B. Du Bois and Martin Luther King Jr. often attempted to deemphasize race in their quest for equality, while those advocating for separatism and colonization emphasized an extreme and irreconcilable difference between races. McCormack argues that the black power movement largely achieved an equilibrium of "balanced and humane ethnocentrism." The impact of the black power movement in generating discussion about ethnic identity and black consciousness supported the appearance and expansion of academic fields of American studies, black studies, and African studies, and the founding of several museums devoted to African-American history and culture in this period. In these ways the black power movement led to greater respect for and attention accorded to African Americans' history and culture.

=== Ghana ===
As the first sub-Saharan African nation to gain independence, President Nkrumah opened Ghana up to African Americans seeking freedom, stating that "the independence of Ghana is meaningless unless it is linked with the total liberation of the whole of Africa". Black power was directly influenced by two key factors: the independence of Ghana and the Cold War ideology. As a result of the Cold War, black radicals and activists were unable to freely propose ideas due to government censorship. Consequently, Ghana became the example for black freedom and liberation movements due to the Cold War ideology and politics proving in the long term to be a factor for the demise of black power.

After Ghana's independence, black power reached the international stage, with visits from notable African American activists, such as Malcolm X in 1964. For many expatriates, 'home' became Ghana due to the freedom of thought, speech, and economy which could not be had in America amidst the ongoing Cold War. Ghana as a place itself inspired black power due to its position as a non-aligned nation during the Cold War. Ghana thus represented a place for black freedom with no constraints by anti-communist, nor communist propaganda. The connection between black power in America and Africa is further shown by the expatriates in Ghana criticising the Kennedy administration and paralleling the March on Washington. Ghana became aligned with the Black power movement, centrally focusing on the black nationalism and the anti-war movement.

Julian Mayfield, who became a prominent member in Ghana as well as influencing African American civil rights, stated that the nonviolent, passive-resistive strategies failed the needs of the lower class blacks. He believed that "the only way to win a revolution is to be revolutionary". America nevertheless managed to keep much of Africa under the western sphere of influence, especially after communism began to enter African countries, with Ghana being one. Black power in Africa soon lost its way though, with the coup and overthrow of Nkrumah and the death of black power advocates, such as Malcolm X. Nevertheless, for a short time, Ghana became a place of freedom and black nationalism, with many African Americans migrating to Ghana during the Cold War to escape the constraints placed on them in American society.

=== Britain ===
Black power got a foothold in Britain when Carmichael came to London in July 1967 to attend the Dialectics of Liberation Congress. As well as his address at the Congress, he also made a speech at Speakers' Corner. At that time, there was no black power organization in Britain, although there was Michael X's Racial Adjustment Action Society (RAAS). However, this was more influenced by the Malcolm X's visit to Britain in 1964. Malcolm X also adopted Islam at this stage, whereas black power was not organized around any religious institution.

The Black Power Manifesto was launched on 10 November 1967, published by the Universal Coloured People's Association. Obi Egbuna, the spokesperson for the group, claimed they had recruited 778 members in London during the previous seven weeks. In 1968 Egbuna published Black Power or Death. He was also active with CLR James, Calvin Hernton and others in the Antiuniversity of London, set up following the Dialectics of Liberation Congress.

Black people in Britain who identified themselves as the British Black Power Movement (BBPM) formed in the 1960s. They worked with the U.S. Black Panther Party in 1967–68, and 1968–72. The On March 2, 1970, roughly one hundred people protested outside the U.S. embassy in Grosvenor Square, London, in support of the U.S. Black Panther founder Bobby Seale, who was on trial for murder in New Haven, Connecticut. They chanted "Free Bobby!" and carried posters proclaiming "Free, Free bobby Seale" and "You can kill a revolutionary but not a revolution." London police arrested sixteen of the protestors that day, three women and thirteen men with threatening and assaulting police officers, distributing a flier entitled "the Definition of Black Power", intending to incite a breach of the peace, and willful damage to a police raincoat. The raincoat charge was dropped by the judge, but the judge found five of the accused guilty of the remaining charges.

=== Jamaica ===
A black power movement arose in Jamaica in the late 1960s. Though Jamaica had gained independence from the British Empire in 1962, and Prime Minister Hugh Shearer was black, many cabinet ministers (such as Edward Seaga) and business elites were white. Large segments of the black majority population were unemployed or did not earn a living wage. The Jamaica Labour Party government of Hugh Shearer banned black power literature such as The Autobiography of Malcolm X and the works of Eldridge Cleaver and Trinidad-born Stokely Carmichael.

Guyanese academic Walter Rodney was appointed as a lecturer at the University of the West Indies in January 1968, and became one of the main exponents of black power in Jamaica. When the Shearer government banned Rodney from re-entering the country, the Rodney Riots broke out. As a result of the Rodney affair, radical groups and publications such as Abeng began to emerge, and the opposition People's National Party gained support. In the 1972 election, the Jamaica Labour Party was defeated by the People's National Party, and Michael Manley, who had expressed support for black power, became prime minister.

=== Trinidad & Tobago ===
The 1970 Black Power Revolution in Trinidad & Tobago was born out of a black power movement that gained strength between 1968 and 1970. The National Joint Action Committee (NJAC) was formed out of the Guild of Undergraduates at the St. Augustine campus of the University of the West Indies (UWI), and under its leader Geddes Granger (later Makandal Daaga), along with Khafra Khambon, they challenged Prime Minister Eric Williams and his government. Simultaneously, there was growing unrest among trade unionists, led by George Weekes of the Oilfields Workers' Trade Union, Clive Nunez of the Transport and Industrial Workers Union, and Basdeo Panday.

In February 1970, a Carnival band, Pinetoppers, presented "The Truth about Africa", with portrayals of Fidel Castro, Kwame Ture and Tubal Uriah Butler. Several marches and protests followed, including a demonstration on 26 February which started outside of the Canadian High Commission and the Royal Bank of Canada to protest the arrest of Caribbean students for an anti-racism sit-in at Sir George Williams University in Montreal. The Prime Minister tried to appease protesters by introducing a five percent levy to fund unemployment relief, and established the first locally owned commercial bank, but this had little impact.

After several weeks of increasingly heated demonstrations, which included disaffected citizens of all ethnicities, Basil Davis, a protester, was killed by the police on 6 April. He was later recognised as the first martyr of the Revolution. His funeral on 9 April saw some 100,000 people join a march from Port of Spain to the San Juan cemetery. On 13 April A. N. R. Robinson, Member of Parliament for Tobago East, resigned. On 18 April, sugar workers went on strike, with rumblings of a general strike to follow. In response, on 21 April, Prime Minister Williams declared a State of Emergency, arresting 15 black power leaders. Some members of the Defence Force, led by Raffique Shah and Rex Lassalle, mutinied, taking hostages at the army barracks in Teteron; the mutiny was ultimately quelled on 25 April. It is often described as an attempted military coup.

Williams, who was accused of upholding colonial and capitalist power structures, endeavoured to win over members of the black power movement by trying to align himself and his party with their aims. In a Cabinet re-shuffle, he removed three ministers (two of them white) and three senators. However, he also introduced the Public Order Act, which reduced civil liberties in a bid to restrict protest marches. After public opposition, led by Robinson and his newly formed Action Committee of Democratic Citizens, the bill was withdrawn.

=== Beauty ===
The cultivation of pride in the African-American race was often summarized in the phrase "black is beautiful". The phrase is rooted in its historical context, yet the relationship to it has changed in contemporary times. A respondent in Bob Blauner's "Longitudinal Oral History of U.S. Race Relations" in 1986 stated: "I don't think it's 'Black is beautiful' anymore. It's 'I am beautiful and I'm black.' It's not the symbolic thing, the afro, power sign ... That phase is over and it succeeded. My children feel better about themselves and they know that they're black." The outward manifestations of an appreciation and celebration of blackness abound: black dolls, natural hair, black Santas, models and celebrities that were once rare and symbolic have become commonplace.

The "black is beautiful" cultural movement aimed to dispel the notion that black people's natural features such as skin color, facial features and hair are inherently ugly. John Sweat Rock was the first to coin the phrase "Black is Beautiful", in the slavery era. The movement asked that men and women stop straightening their hair and attempting to lighten or bleach their skin. The prevailing idea in American culture was that black features were less attractive or desirable than white features.

=== Arts and culture ===
The black power movement produced artistic and cultural products that both embodied and generated pride in "blackness" and further defined an African-American identity that remains contemporary. Black power is often seen as a cultural revolution as much as a political revolution, with the goal of celebrating and emphasizing the distinctive group culture of African Americans to an American society that had previously been dominated by white artistic and cultural expressions. Black power utilized all available forms of folk, literary, and dramatic expression based in a common ancestral past to promote a message of self-actualization and cultural self-definition. The emphasis on a distinctive black culture during the black power movement publicized and legitimized a culture gap between black and white people that had previously been ignored and denigrated. More generally, in recognizing the legitimacy of another culture and challenging the idea of white cultural superiority, the black power movement paved the way for the celebration of multiculturalism in America today.

The cultural concept of "soul" was fundamental to the image of African-American culture embodied by the black power movement. Soul, a type of "in-group cultural cachet", was closely tied to black America's need for individual and group self-identification. A central expression of the "soulfulness" of the black power generation was a cultivation of aloofness and detachment, the creation of an "aura or emotional invulnerability", a persona that challenged their position of relative powerlessness in greater society. The nonverbal expressions of this attitude, including everything from posture to handshakes, were developed as a counterpoint to the rigid, "up-tight" mannerisms of white people. Though the iconic symbol of black power, the arms raised with biceps flexed and clenched fists, is temporally specific, variants of the multitude of handshakes, or "giving and getting skin", in the 1960s and 1970s as a mark of communal solidarity continue to exist as a part of black culture.

Jazz had played a crucial artistic role to the black power movement throughout the 20th century. Throughout the century, jazz had undergone a series of changes in terms of the composition and structure as experimentalists attempted to break away from the status quo. From swing to bebop, hard bop, free/avant-garde, Afrofuturist, and fusion jazz, African-American artists continued to evolve the genre to adapt to the social trends of their time. One of the core reasons behind jazz experimentation was the integration of the music in to the white-controlled mainstream, subjecting the music to marketization for the purpose of entertainment. Kwami Coleman explains this played an integral role in the production of avant-garde jazz in the 1960s as a response to the use of bebop as cultural propaganda during Cold War and its growing reputation as "white music". The structure of avant-garde jazz allowed the musicians to have more creative liberty in their pieces because of the emphasis on improvisation that had contradicted the notions of Euro-American music. This generation, which was grounded within the conditions of the Civil Rights Movement, utilized an Afrological and Afro-Modernist sound to reconnect to African heritage in a move away from American Romanticism. Avant-garde jazz was also developed from the desire of African Americans to develop their own cultural attitudes and structures of power outside of the status-quo; this desire for autonomy is translated into the music and the music is used to express their resistance against the white supremacist system.

Clothing style also became an expression of black power in the 1960s and 1970s. Though many of the popular trends of the movement remained confined to the decade, the movement redefined standards of beauty that were historically influenced by white people and instead celebrated a natural "blackness". As Stokely Carmichael said in 1966, "We have to stop being ashamed of being black. A broad nose, thick lip and nappy hair is us and we are going to call that beautiful whether they like it or not." "Natural" hair styles, such as the Afro, became a socially acceptable tribute to group unity and a highly visible celebration of black heritage. Though the same social messages may no longer consciously influence individual hair or clothing styles in today's society, the black power movement was influential in diversifying standards of beauty and aesthetic choices. The black power movement raised the idea of a black aesthetic that revealed the worth and beauty of all black people.

In developing a powerful identity from the most elemental aspects of African-American folk life, the black power movement generated attention to the concept of "soul food", a fresh, authentic, and natural style of cooking that originated in Africa. The flavor and solid nourishment of the food was credited with sustaining African Americans through centuries of oppression in America and became an important aid in nurturing contemporary racial pride. Black power advocates used the concept of "soul food" to further distinguish between white and black culture; though the basic elements of soul food were not specific to African-American food, Blacks believed in the distinctive quality, if not superiority, of foods prepared by Blacks. No longer racially specific, traditional "soul foods" such as yams, collard greens, and deep-fried chicken continue to hold a place in contemporary culinary life.

==== Black Arts Movement ====
The Black Arts Movement or BAM, founded in Harlem by writer and activist Amiri Baraka (born Everett LeRoy Jones), can be seen as the artistic branch of the black power movement. This movement inspired black people to establish ownership of publishing houses, magazines, journals and art institutions. Other well-known writers who were involved with this movement included Nikki Giovanni; Don L. Lee, later known as Haki Madhubuti; Sonia Sanchez; Maya Angelou; Dudley Randall; Sterling Plumpp; Larry Neal; Ted Joans; Ahmos Zu-Bolton; and Etheridge Knight. Several black-owned publishing houses and publications sprang from the BAM, including Madhubuti's Third World Press, Broadside Press, Zu-Bolton's Energy Black South Press, and the periodicals Callaloo and Yardbird Reader. Although not strictly involved with the Movement, other notable African-American writers such as novelists Ishmael Reed and Toni Morrison and poet Gwendolyn Brooks can be considered to share some of its artistic and thematic concerns.

BAM sought "to link, in a highly conscious manner, art and politics in order to assist in the liberation of black people", and produced an increase in the quantity and visibility of African-American artistic production. Though many elements of the Black Arts movement are separate from the black power movement, many goals, themes, and activists overlapped. Literature, drama, and music of black people "served as an oppositional and defensive mechanism through which creative artists could confirm their identity while articulating their own unique impressions of social reality." In addition to acting as highly visible and unifying representations of "blackness", the artistic products of the black power movement also utilized themes of black empowerment and liberation. For instance, black recording artists not only transmitted messages of racial unity through their music, they also became significant role models for a younger generation of African Americans. Updated protest songs not only bemoaned oppression and societal wrongs, but utilized adversity as a reference point and tool to lead others to activism. Some black power-era artists conducted brief mini-courses in the techniques of empowerment. In the tradition of cultural nationalists, these artists taught that in order to alter social conditions, black people first had to change the way they viewed themselves; they had to break free of white norms and strive to be more natural, a common theme of African-American art and music. Musicians such as the Temptations sang lyrics such as "I have one single desire, just like you / So move over, son, 'cause I'm comin' through" in their song "Message From a Black Man", they expressed the revolutionary sentiments of the black power movement.

Ishmael Reed, who is considered neither a movement apologist nor advocate, said: "I wasn't invited to participate because I was considered an integrationist" but he went on to explain the positive aspects of the Black Arts Movement and the black power movement:

I think what Black Arts did was inspire a whole lot of Black people to write. Moreover, there would be no multiculturalism movement without Black Arts. Latinos, Asian Americans, and others all say they began writing as a result of the example of the 1960s. Blacks gave the example that you don't have to assimilate. You could do your own thing, get into your own background, your own history, your own tradition and your own culture. I think the challenge is for cultural sovereignty and Black Arts struck a blow for that.

By breaking into a field typically reserved for white Americans, artists of the black power era expanded opportunities for current African Americans. "Today's writers and performers", writes William L. Van Deburg, "recognize that they owe a great deal to black power's explosion of cultural orthodoxy."

BAM could be easily described through the Association for the Advancement of Creative Musicians, or AACM, a collective of Black musicians and composers that was founded in the South Side of Chicago. Their goal was the nurturing, performing, and recording of Black jazz. At the time of the AACM's founding jazz was facing a massive crisis; clubs were rapidly being closed, gig opportunities sharply decreased, and jazz experimentalists did not connect with large audiences due to their unconventional style. The AACM created a power structure for African-American musicians, especially women who typically faced large amounts of discrimination in the industry, that allowed for the fostering of a healthy jazz community outside of the predatory record companies.

== Criticism ==
Bayard Rustin, an elder statesman of the Civil Rights Movement, was a harsh critic of black power in its earliest days. Writing in 1966, shortly after the March Against Fear, Rustin said that black power "not only lacks any real value for the civil rights movement, but ... its propagation is positively harmful. It diverts the movement from a meaningful debate over strategy and tactics, it isolates the Negro community, and it encourages the growth of anti-Negro forces." He particularly criticized the Congress of Racial Equality (CORE) and SNCC for their turn toward black power, arguing that these two organizations once "awakened the country, but now they emerge isolated and demoralized, shouting a slogan that may afford a momentary satisfaction but that is calculated to destroy them and their movement."

The black power slogan was also criticized by Martin Luther King Jr., who stated that the black power movement "connotates black supremacy and an anti-white feeling that does not or should not prevail." The NAACP also disapproved of black power. Roy Wilkins, then the NAACP's executive director, stated that black power was "a reverse Hitler, a reverse Ku Klux Klan...the father of hate and mother of violence." The black power slogan was also met with opposition from the leadership of SCLC and the Urban League.

Politicians in high office also spoke out against black power: in 1966, President Lyndon B. Johnson criticized extremists on both sides of the racial divide, stating "we're not interested in black power and we are not interested in white power, but we are interested in American democratic power, with a small 'd'". At an NAACP rally the next day, Vice President Hubert Humphrey argued "Racism is racism and we must reject calls for racism whether they come from a throat that is white or one that is black."

=== Responses ===
Kwame Ture, formerly known as Stokely Carmichael, and Charles V. Hamilton, both activists with the Student Nonviolent Coordinating Committee and authors of the book, Black Power: The Politics of Liberation highlight that some observers and critics of the black power movement conflated "black power" with "black supremacy". They countered that black power advocates were not proposing a mirror-image of white supremacy and domination, instead they were working towards "an effective share in the total power of society".

== See also ==
- African independence movements
- Black Power in the Caribbean
- Black Power movement in Montreal
- Black Power (New Zealand), Māori gang
- Black supremacy – Belief in superiority of black people
- Deacons for Defense and Justice
- Ben Fletcher
- Hubert Harrison
- Melanin theory
- Négritude
- Protests of 1968
- Republic of New Africa
- Reverse racism
- Kémi Séba
- White nationalism
- White power – White supremacist political slogan and ideology
- White separatism

== Cited sources ==
- Joseph, Peniel E. (2006). Waiting 'Til the Midnight Hour: A Narrative History of Black Power in America. Holt and Company. ISBN 978-0805083354.
- Van DeBurg, William L. (1992). New Day in Babylon: The Black Power Movement and American Culture, 1965–1975. The University of Chicago Press. ISBN 0226847152.
