= Feldstein =

Feldstein is a surname common among Ashkenazi Jews. Notable people with the surname include:

- Al Feldstein (1925-2014), American painter
- Beanie Feldstein (born 1993), American actress and singer
- Cemach Feldstein (1884-1944), Russian Jewish educator murdered by the Nazis
- Jack Feldstein, Australian animator
- Jonah Hill Feldstein (born 1983), American actor
- Jordan Feldstein (1977–2017), manager for Maroon 5
- Lewis M. Feldstein, American attorney
- Mark Feldstein (1937-2001), American artist and photographer
- Martin "Marty" S. Feldstein (1939-2013), American economist
- Ruth Feldstein, American historian
