= Abeng =

The Abeng is a cultural heritage instrument rooted in community with the Maroons of Jamaica. The culture surrounding the abeng originated in African Jamaican traditions inherited from the enslaved Africans trafficked to the island.

For the Jamaican newspaper, see Abeng (newspaper). For the 1984 novel by Michelle Cliff, see Abeng (novel).

== Construction ==
The abeng is an aerophone made specifically from cow's horn. Though similar instruments such as the Cambodian sneng may be made from a bull's horn, a Jamaican abeng is not. An important factor to consider is that the cows in Jamaica do not grow such large horns anymore due to selective breeding resulting in reduced construction of abengs.

The process begins by chiseling the tip of the cow's horn off with a saw. Following the carving, the horn is shaved down slightly, typically with a common tool such as a knife, and finished off with a rinse of alcohol. Additionally, the abeng is made to be blown as a side-blow horn with the open part sticking up to the sky to echo the sound.

== History ==
The Maroons of Jamaica used the abeng to communicate encoded messages that could not be understood by people outside of the community over great distances. The Maroons are the ethnic group that resulted from the socialization of imported enslaved Africans and indigenous Taino peoples. The Maroons were able to retain much of their original African heritage, hailing mostly from the Akan region in Ghana, by escaping to settle in inaccessible regions of Jamaica, such as its mountains. The Chief Abeng blower of present-day Accompong Town chronicles that the enslaved Africans who became the Maroons initially brought four abengs from Africa to Jamaica.

Evidently, this isolation from the developing society preserved both the make and sound of African instruments like the abeng. The word "abeng" itself originated in the Twi language as "aben" from what is currently known as the country of Ghana. The abeng then acts as a conservation of African heritage that is unique to the Jamaican Maroons through both music and language.

== Modern applications ==
As West Indian Black Power movements rose in popularity during the 60s and 70s, the abeng became a political representation of Black pride and African ancestry. Abeng grew to be the name of a newspaper that explored political ideas from the likes of Marcus Garvey to that of Norman Manley. Abeng had a short run of about a year, but during that time, the newspaper reflected the radical arguments of young Jamaican activists of its day.

There is also a 1984 novel titled Abeng by Michelle Cliff that is inspired by Jamaican history of the 1950s and, in part, Maroon culture.

Today, the abeng (instrument) is still routinely used in Maroon communities on ceremonial occasions or to announce important news like community wide meetings or a death.

== See also ==
- Sneng a similar side-blown horn in Cambodia
