= Ellen Handy =

American art critic and historian

Ellen Joan Handy is an American art critic and historian of art, printmaking, and photography. She is Chair of the Photography Department of the City College of New York. She is known for both her knowledge of historical movements and genres, such as Japanese photo-postcards and her commitment to developing original talent. Some artists who later became well-known were championed by her in their early years, such as Barbara Rosenthal and Mark Feldstein.

== Life and career ==
Handy was born in Schenectady, New York. Her father, Rollo Handy, is an itinerant philosopher; her mother was Toni Scheiner. Handy graduated from Barnard College in 1980 while still a teenager and later received a Ph.D. from Princeton University.

Handy has written for international publications such as Arts magazine,^{[better source needed]} as well as small, regional ones, such as The Catskill Center for Photography Quarterly. She has contributed essays to reference books such as Cézanne and American Modernism.

Handy has been Curator of Collections at the International Center of Photography, and in 1999, edited reference books the Center published, such as Reflections in a Glass Eye. She has also held curatorial posts at the Metropolitan Museum of Art and, briefly, the Harry Ransom Center at the University of Texas. She has been an instructor in Christie's M.A. program and a faculty member at Bard College and LaGuardia Community College.
