= Pepa (instrument) =

Hornpipe musical instrument

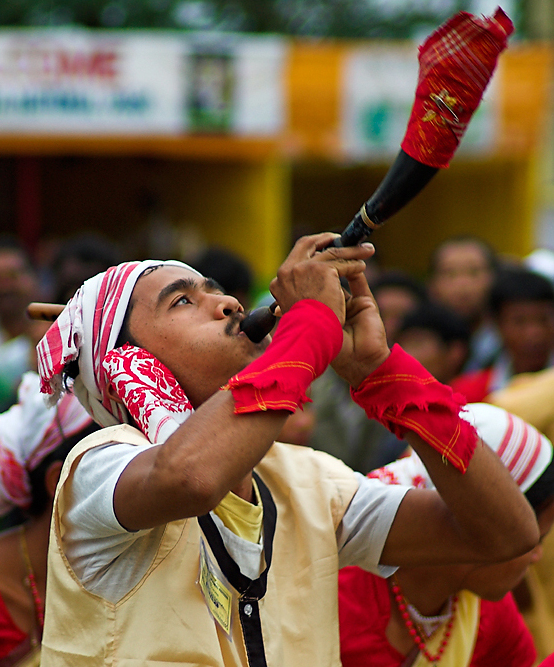
- A Bihu dancer blowing a Pepa.

Related instruments
- Pung Sing (Nepal)

The pepa is a hornpipe musical instrument that is used in traditional music in Assam, India. In Boro language, it is known as Phenpha. It is usually made with the horn of a buffalo.

== Significance ==
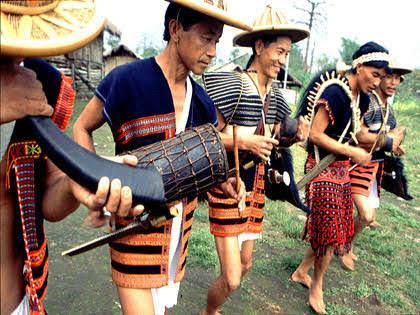
Buffalo horn trumpet of Mishmi people.

"Pepa" is a hornpipe which has been used during Bihu celebrations since ancient times. Instruments similar to Pepa are found among groups like Garo, Tripuri, Dimasa, Mishmi, Mising, Karbi, etc. The Tibetans (Rwa-dun), Sino-tibetan Yi people also use a Pepa-like trumpet made of buffalo horn. Khmers (Austroasiatic) also use a similar horn instrument named Sneng for religious rituals, although Sneng is blown in the center, not at the end, unlike the rest of the instruments. An improved version of Pepa was also developed in the Chutia kingdom which was known as Kaali (made of copper) as mentioned in Deodhai Buranji (where Ahom king Suhungmung brought in Kaali instruments from Sadiya to Sibsagar).

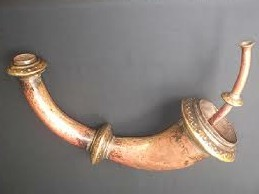
Kaali musical instrument derived from Pepa

As the buffalo population is dwindling gradually in Assam due to shrinking pastoral lands, getting a pepa is currently very difficult. Cost of a pepa in market has even reached ₹2500 in recent years.

== See also ==
- Culture of Assam
- Sneng
