= Black Power in the Caribbean =

Political and social movements in the Caribbean

Black Power in the Caribbean refers to political and social movements in the Caribbean region from the mid-1960s to mid-1970s that focused on overturning the existing racist power structure. Guyanese academic Walter Rodney famously defined the movement as follows: "Black Power in the West Indies means three closely related things":

1. the break with imperialism which is historically white racist
2. the assumption of power by the black masses in the islands
3. the cultural reconstruction of the society in the image of the blacks

== Black Power in Jamaica ==
The Black Power movement in Jamaica developed in the 1960s. Major figures in the movement include Walter Rodney and the Abeng group.

== Black Power in Trinidad & Tobago ==
The Black Power movement in Trinidad & Tobago emerged in the late-1960s and came to a head with the Black Power Revolution in February 1970. It had as a precursor the labour uprisings of the 1930s. Key figures in the Black Power movement include Makandal Daaga, Clive Nunez and Basdeo Panday. The movement was responsible for bringing about significant social changes within Trinidad & Tobago, in particular the upward mobility of blacks in corporate Trinidad.

== Black Power in Haiti ==
The Haitian revolution is one of the most exemplifying parts in history pertaining to black power in the Caribbean. This revolution led Haiti to become the first black republic of the new world. Haitians developed a fierce vibrant and resistant culture in which they defended themselves from the British, Spanish, and French.

Bois Caïman is where a Vodou ceremony took place in which the first major slave revolt of the Haitian Revolution was planned. On August 14, 1791, slaves from nearby plantations gathered to participate in a secret ceremony conducted in the woods in the French colony of Saint-Domingue. A prominent slave leader and Vodou priest, Dutty Boukman, gave the signal to begin the revolt. The ceremony began the era of black power in Haiti. The effect a couple months after the revolt was that slave rebels controlled a third of the island by 1792.

== See also ==
- Black Power
- Black Power Revolution
- Walter Rodney
- Makandal Daaga
- Pan-Africanism
