= Sneng =

Aerophone made from an ox horn or water buffalo horn

Sneng ស្នែង
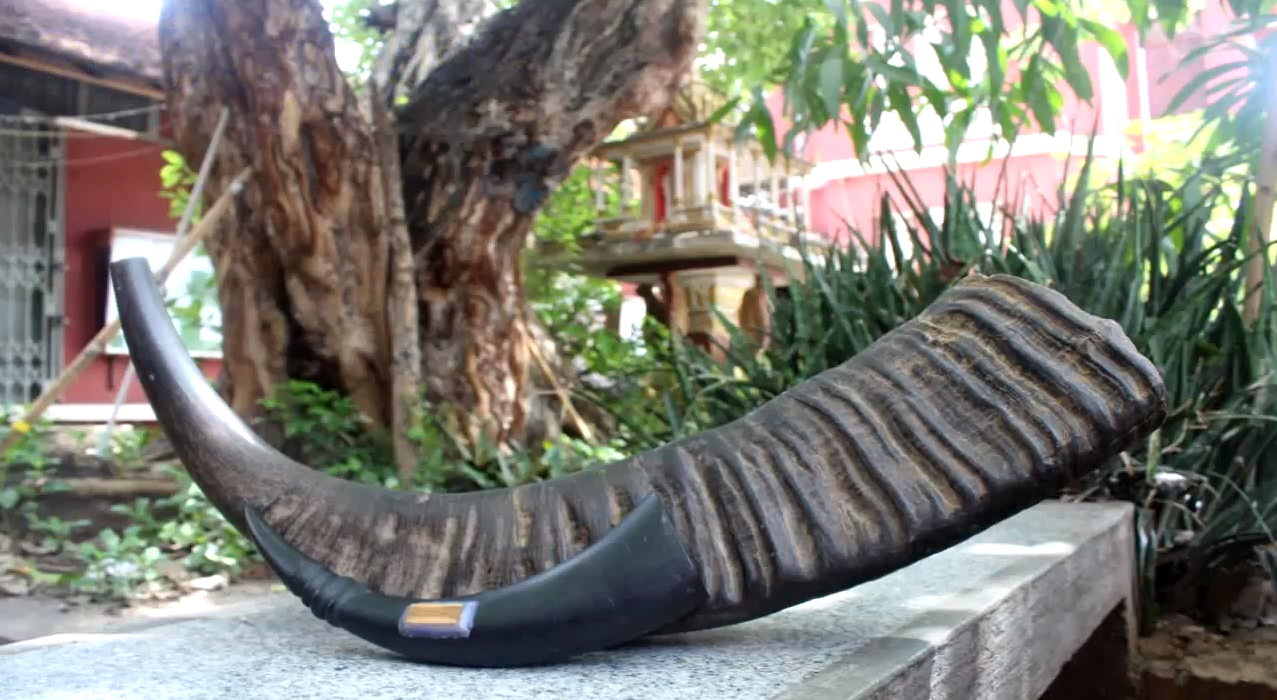
- A side-blown Cambodian musical instrument called a Sneng ស្នែង, made from a cow's horn, sits in front of an end-blown sneng, made from a water buffalo horn. The side-blown instrument's mouthpiece is visible on the side of the horn.
- Other names: saamleng sneng
- Classification: side-blown: woodwind end-blown: brass
- Hornbostel–Sachs classification: side-blown: 422.33 end-blown: 423.121.21 (side-blown: horns with free reed end-blown: labrosones with curved tubes without mouthpiece)

Related instruments
- Abeng (Maroon people) (Jamaica); Gweh (Karen people); Koy (Thailand); Kwai (Myanmar)); Pepa (Assam); Pung Sing Nepal; Tơ đjếp (Vietnam)

A side-blown sneng plays, demonstrating the multiple tones possible from the instrument. Side blown instruments may have two fingerholes, one on each end of the instrument. End-blown instruments have no fingerholes and only one note.

The sneng or snaeng (Khmer: ស្នែង, "horn") is an aerophone made from an ox horn or water buffalo horn. It is loud enough to call across a distance and has been used in rural environments to signal mealtimes, give warning, call for help or indicate a need to return to the village. It was also used to call domestic elephants in from the field, and hunters communicated with it.

Two different types of sneng exist:

- The more common one is a side-blown instrument with a rectangular hole on the side of the horn, where a bamboo single-free-reed mouthpiece is fastened with wax. The reed there can be either blown or sucked to produce a tone. Both ends of the horn are open and function as finger holes to change the pitch, the pointed end covered by the left index finger and the wide end covered by the right palm. This type is capable of two notes, tuned a fourth apart.
- Another type is an end-blown instrument with the tip of the horn cut off and without the bamboo mouthpiece, like the conventional blowing horn. It is less common because it produces only one note.

== See also ==
- Abeng, a similar side-blown horn in Jamaica
- Tơ đjếp, the Vietnamese version of the instrument
