= Ben Fletcher =

American labor leader and public speaker (1890–1949)

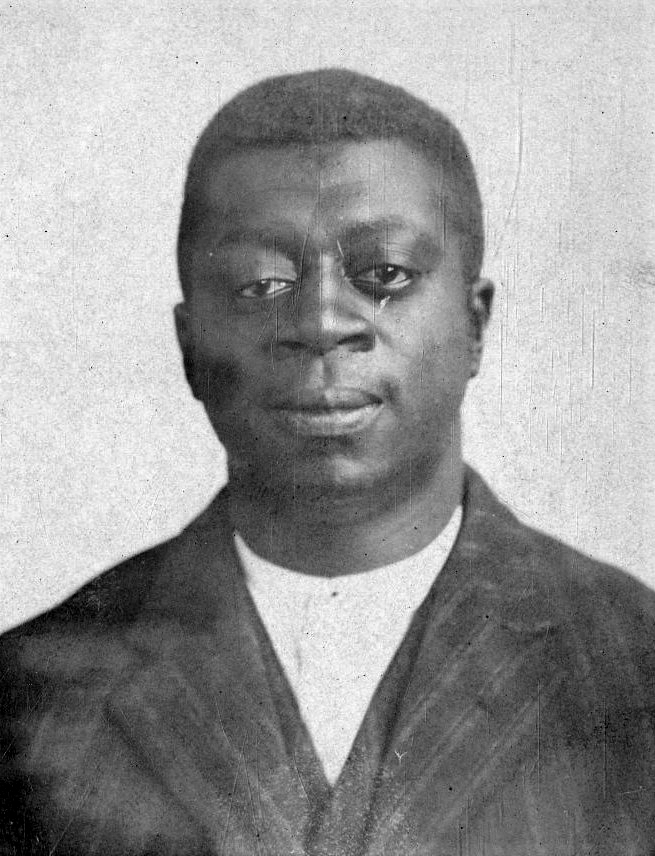
- Fletcher's Leavenworth Penitentiary mugshot, September 1918
- Born: April 13, 1890; Philadelphia, Pennsylvania, U.S.
- Died: July 10, 1949 (aged 59); Brooklyn, New York City, U.S.
- Occupations: Union activist; longshoreman
- Years active: 1913–1949

Benjamin Harrison Fletcher (April 13, 1890 – July 10, 1949) was an early 20th-century African-American labor leader and public speaker. He was a prominent member of the Industrial Workers of the World (IWW, or the "Wobblies"), a left-wing trade union which was influential during his time. Fletcher co-founded and helped lead the interracial Local 8 branch of the IWW’s Marine Transport Workers Industrial Union.

== Early life ==
Benjamin Harrison Fletcher was born in Philadelphia, Pennsylvania on April 13, 1890. He worked as a day laborer and a longshoreman, loading and unloading ships. Fletcher joined the IWW and the Socialist Party around 1912. Shortly thereafter, Fletcher became a leader of the IWW in Philadelphia, beginning a career in public speaking that won him many accolades.

== Local 8 ==
Fletcher, along with other Industrial Workers of the World (IWW) members, co-founded Local 8 of the Marine Transport Workers Industrial Union in Philadelphia in 1913. The local was unique in its time for being interracial, with about one-third of its members African American, another one-third Irish American, and the remaining one-third largely composed of other European immigrants. Upon its formation, Fletcher helped lead Local 8. Its members espoused anti-capitalist and anti-racist rhetoric, and were subject to red-baiting by dockyard bosses and local government officials. By 1916, all but two of Philadelphia's docks were under IWW control. Local 8 exercised considerable control of Philadelphia's waterfront for about a decade.

== Subsequent organizing efforts ==
Following the successful organization of Local 8 in Philadelphia, Fletcher traveled up and down the U.S. eastern seaboard on behalf of the IWW. In a 1931 Amsterdam News interview (his only known interview), he recounted his escape from a potential lynching in 1917 while trying to organize a union among dock workers in Norfolk, Virginia. From there he fled to Boston, where he continued his organizing activities for a brief period.

== Treason arrest and sentence ==
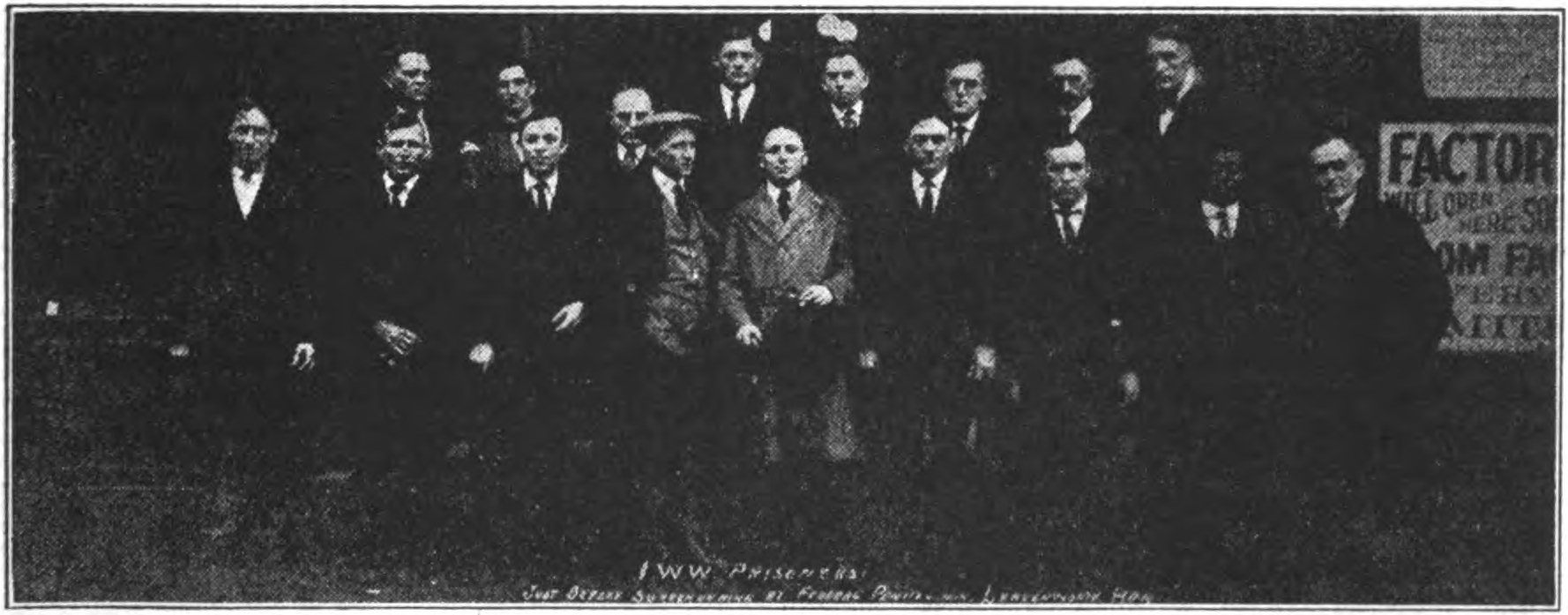
Fletcher (front row, second from right) amongst a group of I.W.W. prisoners, June 1921

While in Boston, Fletcher learned he was to be indicted for labor organizing. He returned to Philadelphia where he said that he "preferred to be placed under arrest." Upon his return, Fletcher and 165 other union activists were publicly indicted. At the time, the IWW had about a million members, including 100,000 black workers who were rejected from other unions such as the American Federation of Labor. Fletcher was arrested on February 9, 1918, and held with a $10,000 bond. Two weeks later, the district attorney reduced the bond to $1,500, which was promptly paid for by the IWW.

Fletcher was charged with treasonous activities, and was the only Black person among the 166 IWW members tried. While no direct evidence of treason was provided against him, Local 8, or even the IWW (most of the "evidence" consisted of statements expressing the IWW's anti-capitalist beliefs, rather than any planned actions to interrupt the war effort), all of the defendants were found guilty—the jury came back in under an hour, all guilty on all counts. Fletcher was fined $30,000 and sentenced to ten years in the Leavenworth federal penitentiary in Kansas. As the sentences were announced, IWW leader Bill Haywood reported that, "Ben Fletcher sidled over to me and said: 'The Judge has been using very ungrammatical language.' I looked at his smiling black face and asked: 'How's that, Ben? He said: 'His sentences are much too long.'" While in jail, Fletcher's release became a cause célèbre among Black radicals, championed by The Messenger, a monthly magazine co-edited by A. Philip Randolph. Fletcher served for approximately three years before his sentence was commuted, along with most of the other jailed Wobblies, in 1922.

== Post-release and death ==
After his release, Fletcher remained committed to the IWW, though he never played as active a role again as he had prior to imprisonment. He stayed involved in Local 8, but was not a central figure. During the 1920s, he collaborated with the Communist Party USA, where he clashed with Lovett Fort-Whiteman. Fletcher later denounced the CPUSA as insincere, and warned that it was trying to take over the IWW's unions. He continued to give occasional speeches on tours and street corners into the 1930s. Like other longshoreman, he faced health problems from a relatively young age. He subsequently moved to Bedford-Stuyvesant in Brooklyn with his wife, where he worked as a building superintendent, until he died in 1949. He is buried in Brooklyn, New York.

== Legacy ==
The union that Fletcher helped lead for a decade, Local 8, stands as a rare example of interracial equality in the early 20th century. On June 21, 2025, a Pennsylvania State Historical Marker was unveiled in Philadelphia commemorating Fletcher and Local 8.
