= Cemach Feldstein =

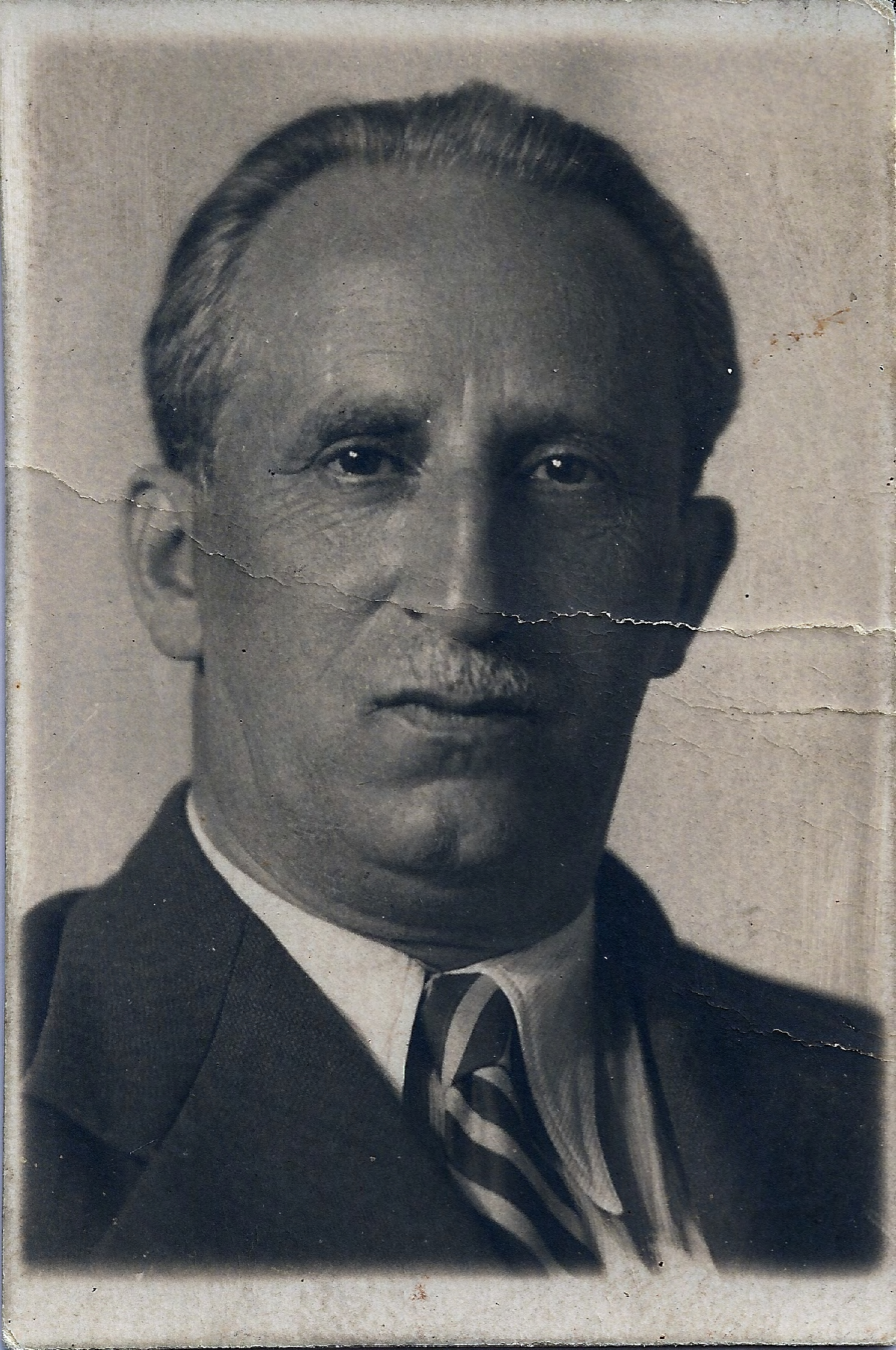
- Born: December 30, 1884; Kudirkos Naumiestis, Suwałki Governorate, Russian Empire (Lithuania)
- Died: December 29, 1944 (aged 59); Dautmergen-Schömberg concentration camps, (Natzweiler-Struthof), Germany
- Occupation: Educator
- Employer(s): Hebrew Real-Gymnasium, Kaunas
- Spouse: Elke Freida (née Buzhanski)

Cemach Feldstein ([t͡ʃɛɱɑħ fɛldstajn]; sometimes spelled Tzemach; Hebrew: צמח פלדשטיין; Yiddish: פעלדשטיין; Lithuanian: Feldsteinas; Russian: Семён Григорович Фельдштейн, Semyon Grigorovitch; December 30, 1884 - December 29, 1944 was a Lithuanian educator, author, an education reformist, a culture Zionist activist. As an educator he was served as the director of several Jewish gymnasiums, the most notable of which was the Hebrew Real-Gymnasium in Kaunas (Kovno), Lithuania (1922-1940), where most of the subjects were taught in Modern Hebrew.

After being deported to the Vilna Ghetto in 1941, Feldstein continued to be a cultural activist. He became the editor of the ghetto newspaper, translated essays and writings into Hebrew, gave lectures, and was an inspirational coordinator of the ghetto's cultural life.

== Early life and education ==
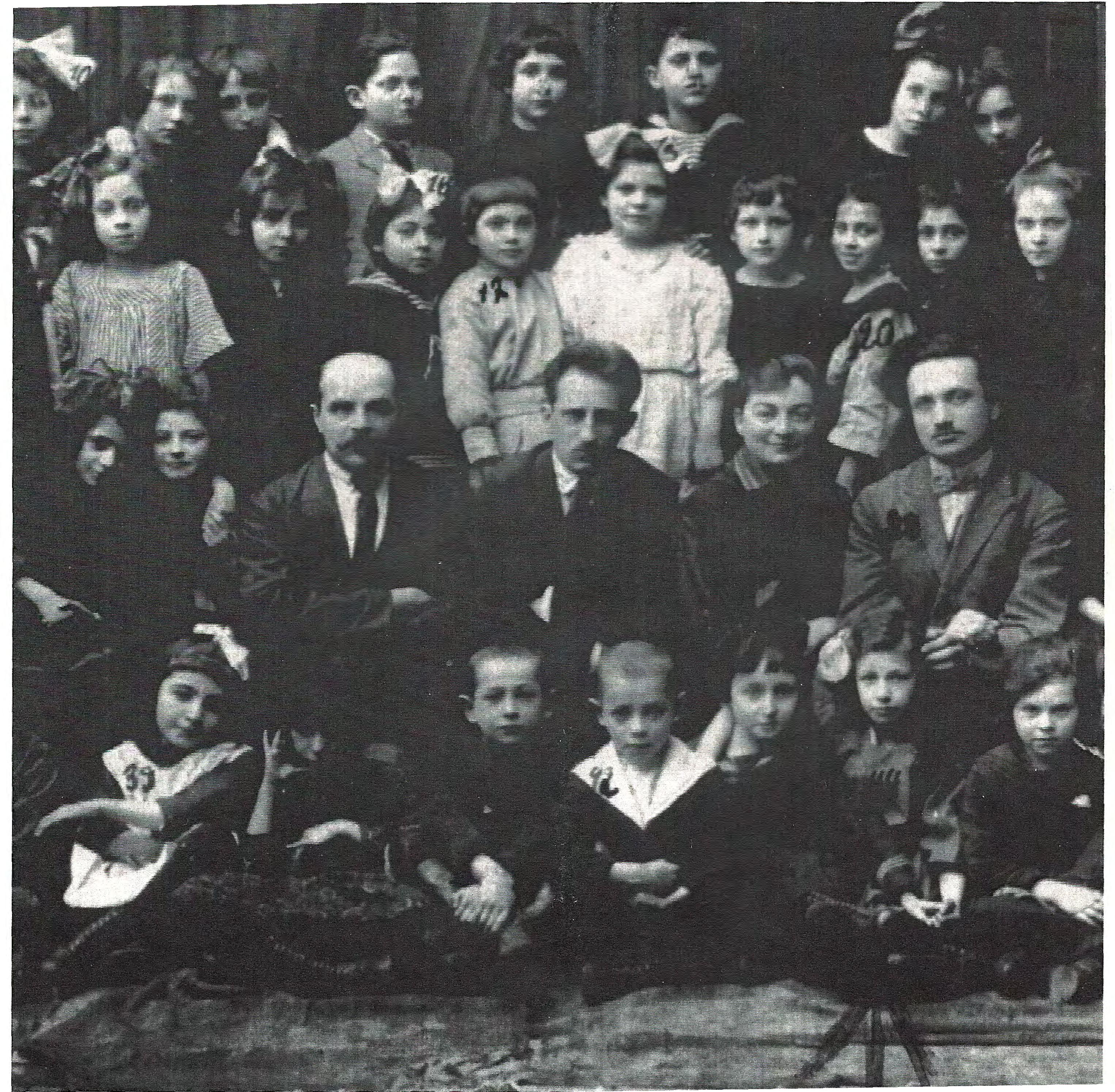
Cemach Feldstein (second row, center) with pupils and faculty of the Hebrew Realgymnasium c. 1920s

Cemach Ben Zvi Feldstein was born in the town of Kudirkos Naumiestis, Suwałki Governorate, Russian Empire (southern Lithuania) on December 30, 1884, the eldest of five children (two boys and three girls), the son of Zvi Feldstein, a Jewish orthodox merchant, and Malka Leah. Feldstein studied in several schools and graduated from a Gymnasium in Königsberg, East Prussia, Germany. He then enrolled at the University of Berlin, where he studied history and philosophy. After finishing his first degree, Feldstein continued his education at the University of Bern in Switzerland, where he received a doctoral degree. His dissertation, which was guided by Ludwig Stein, was on the foundations of Hermann Cohen’s interpretation of Kant’s Ethics (Cohens Begründung der Ethik). The dissertation, submitted in November 1907, was published in Breslau in 1914. During his studies at Bern, he met his future wife, Elke Freida Buzhanski, who was close to finishing her medical studies. She gave up completing her degree to marry him in 1910. The couple moved to Warsaw, Russian Poland where he became a teacher of Hebrew culture at the Jewish high school of Magnus Krynski. The couple had three children: Araeh Leib (Liova; b. 1911), Esther (Toussia; b. 1914), and Joshua (Yehoshua; b. 1921).

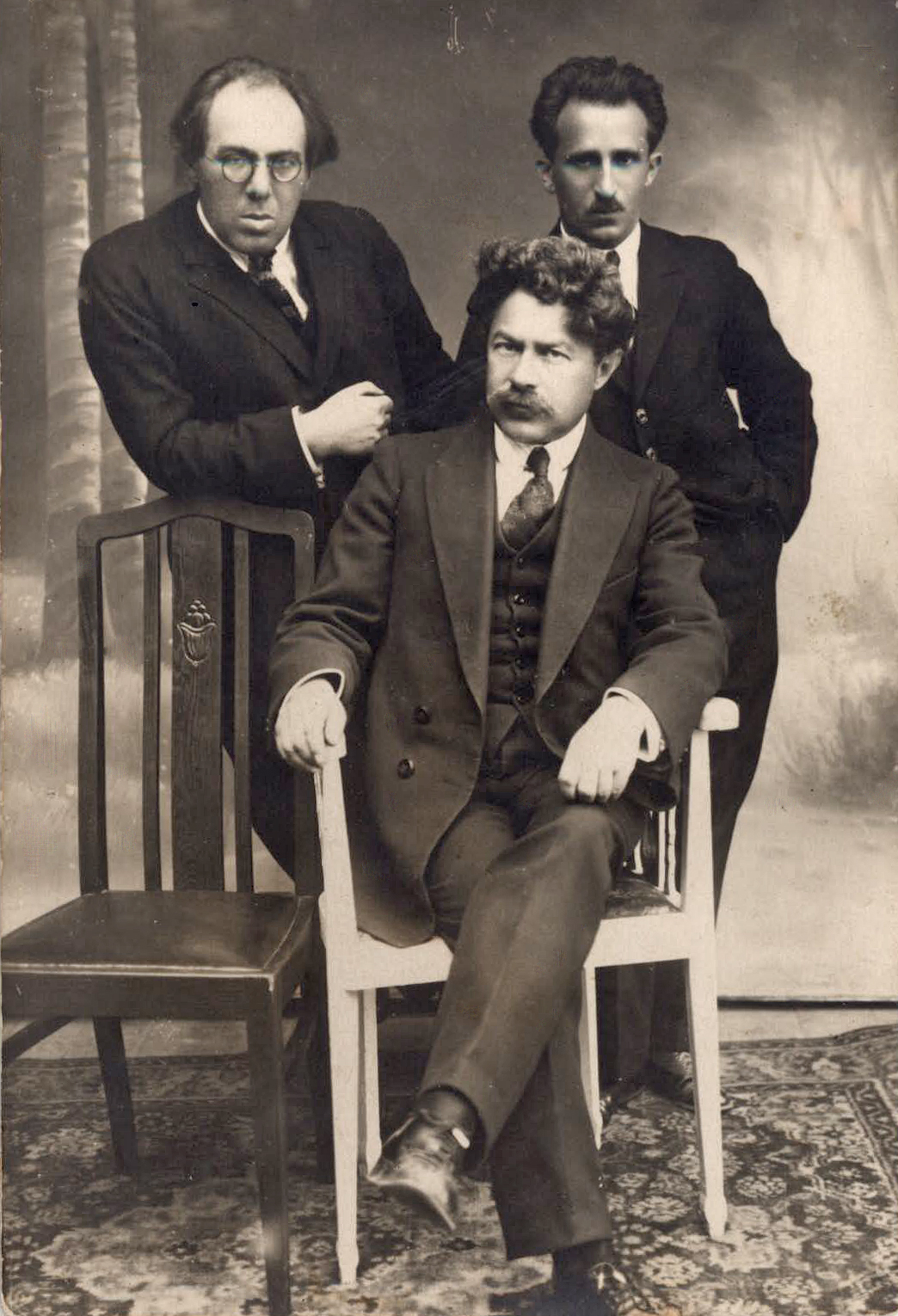
Nathan Goren, Shaul Tchernichovsky and Cemach Feldstein in Kaunas, c. 1927

== Career ==
In 1913, Feldstein served as the first director of the bilingual Jewish Gymnasium founded in Kalisz, Poland. During the First World War, he and his wife moved to Minsk, Russia where he founded and directed a private Gymnasium and his wife taught there mathematics and Russian literature.

After the end of the war and the establishment of the first Lithuanian Republic, Feldstein and his family returned to Lithuania. From 1921 to 1922 he served as the director of the Hebrew Gymnasium in Vilkaviškis (Vilkovishk) (founded in 1919), where all subjects were taught using Sephardi diction (as was the custom in the New Yishuv in BritishPalestine, rather than the Ashkenazi one, which customary among Lithuanian Jews).

In 1922, Feldstein went to the de facto capital of Lithuania, Kaunas, to replace Shalom Yona Tscherna as the principal of the Hebrew Real-Gymnasium (Jüdisches Realgymnasium), founded by the German Jewish Rabbi Joseph Hirsch (Tzvi (Carlebach) in 1915. Feldstein directed the gymnasium from 1922 until it closed during the Soviet invasion in 1940. He was director of the gymnasium for most of its years. The Hebrew Reali Gymnasium was a private school and one of the largest Jewish educational institutions in Lithuania. At the gymnasium he lectured on topics from world literature (using Hebrew translation) and general history. One of his students, Jacob Yozelit, who later became a Hebrew educator in the United States, wrote this about Feldstein:

He was blessed with a great talent, a sharp and precise way of speaking - pleasant and clear. He imparted to his students broad knowledge using a clear easy method of comfortable explanation. As he read his lectures, the Divine Presence rested over the department. Dr. Feldstein could draw and describe a period and insert into it a breath of life, until you thought you were living and working in the spoken period and were saturated in the atmosphere. You felt that he enjoyed teaching and the students enjoyed learning. He was a man of high stature. He could bring the students to the Torah and, in fact, excite them and possess their hearts. He was a friend, father, and mentor to his students.

The principal language of instruction at the gymnasium was Hebrew. All the courses were in Hebrew except for Lithuanian studies (language, literature, history). Among themselves, the students spoke Yiddish (the language spoken by Jews in Eastern Europe). According to his student Yozelit, Feldstein asked the students to speak Hebrew outside the school as well, and they tried to follow his request. The school's rented buildings (separate sections for boys and girls) were not comfortable; the classrooms were small and crowded. At the end of 1928, with the approval of the Lithuanian Ministry of Education, Feldstein visited the United States to raise funds for the Hebrew schools in Lithuania (including Tarbut's schools), and thus managed to raise capital for a new home for his gymnasium. He enlisted the help of the Hebrew poet, Shaul Tchernichovsky, in return for a fair payment, and the two traveled to the United States for several months. With many donations, including a significant one from the famous Lithuanian-born Jewish American philanthropist Edward Max Chase, and a loan from the Lithuanian Treasury, in the early 1930s a new, fully equipped building was built for the gymnasium.

In addition to Feldstein's work as the director of the gymnasium, he was active in the Zionist movement along with being a Hebrew educational and cultural activist. Feldstein was a member of the Zionist Center (General Zionists) and a member of the Central Committee of the Hebrew Zionist education culture network Tarbut in Lithuania. He was active in the ethnographic-historical society in Kaunas, and he devoted his energy and his own money to the Jewish Community University (folks-universitet). Feldstein regularly spoke Hebrew, Yiddish, German, Russian, English, and Lithuanian, and could also speak in French and Polish. He was a brilliant speaker and he participated in the Jewish press, where he published articles on Jewish and world literature. He published pedagogical articles in the Hebrew-language journal Hed Lita (הד ליטא; Hebrew: Lithuania' Echo) and in the Lithuanian Hebrew Teachers Association organ, BeMish'oley HaHinukh (In the Paths of Education). In 1935, he visited Mandatory Palestine, and he published his impressions in a series of articles in the Zionist Jewish Lithuanian daily, Di Idishe Shtime (די אידישע שטימע; Yiddish: The Jewish voice)

In the summer of 1940, after the Soviet occupation and the establishment of the Lithuanian Soviet Socialist Republic as one of the republics of the Soviet Union, the gymnasium switched to teaching in Yiddish at the demand of the authorities. Feldstein and his family moved to the old Lithuanian capital of Vilnius where most of his wife's relatives lived. There, Feldstein taught Russian at the “Real Yiddish” Gymnasium which Leib Turbowicz, the husband of his wife's sister, Nadia, founded and directed. Initially, Feldstein's family lived with his wife's niece's family. Their niece was later exiled to Siberia, survived, and sometime after that immigrated to the United States.

== Deportation ==
In the summer of 1941, the Nazis deported Feldstein, along with the other Jews who had survived, to the Vilna ghetto. In the ghetto, he first served as the director of the post office. Then, he served as the deputy director in the Department of Culture of the Jewish Council (Judenrat) under the director, Leo Bernstein. Even though he was subject to despair, he was active in the cultural life, gave lectures in philosophy and history, and encouraged community members to hope for better days. He was the editor of the ghetto's official publication of “News of the Ghetto”. The issues were usually between six and ten pages, sometimes reaching sixteen pages. The staff printed a few dozen copies and distributed them at several sites in the ghetto.” Feldstein was a major participant in the “United Hebrew Committee of the Zionist Underground”, coordinated cultural activities in the Hebrew language, and helped give birth to the "Hebrew Scientific Society". Additionally, Feldstein wrote his memoirs, translated the opera “Aida“ into Hebrew and wrote literary essays in both Hebrew and Yiddish on Chaim Bialik, Y.L. Peretz, Ahad Ha’Am, and others. Later Feldstein was marched along with many others from the ghetto to the labor camp Kiviõli in Estonia. At this point, he was very weak and could not work, but those who knew him helped him manage to escape a few selections for some time. Finally, the Nazis transferred him to the sub-camp Dautmergen-Schömberg, (Natzweiler-Struthof) in southern Germany, where he died in December 1944.

His youngest son, Joshua Feldstein, later wrote that "he was an excellent teacher, role model, mentor, and consultant; he has inspired me as with many students over the years. He and my mother instilled in their children morals and high values, respect for every person, tolerance, the importance of knowledge and education, social and communication skills, love of nature, music, literature, poetry, the commitment to help those in need, and above all, pride in being a Jew, eternal hope for a better future and a belief in God."

== Family ==
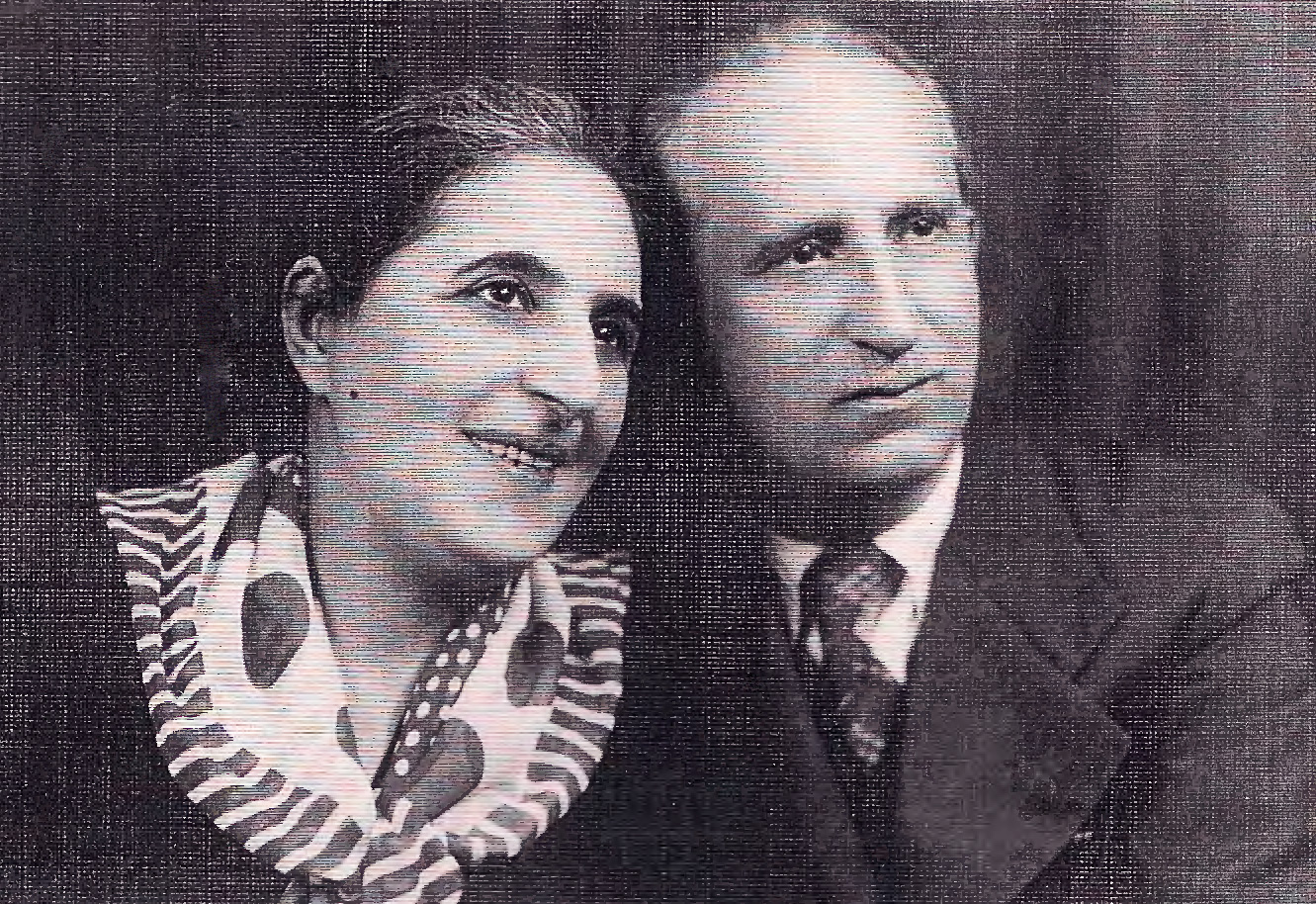
Cemach Feldstein and his wife Fania

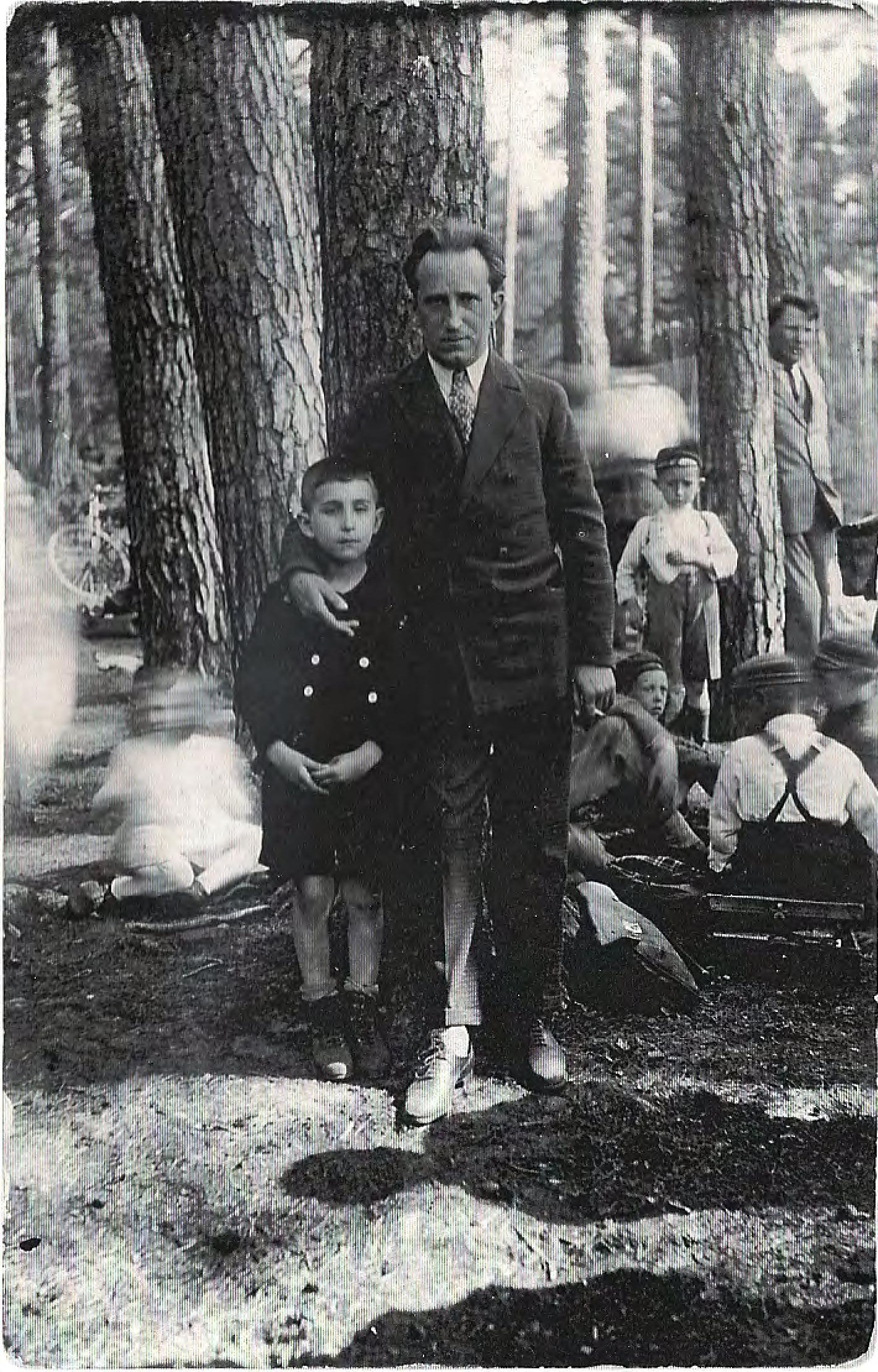
Cemach Feldstein with his son Joshua on a Lag BaOmer Trip to Kulautuva in 1928

Feldstein's eldest son, Lev (Liova) Feldstein, began his medical studies at the University of Nancy, in France, and finished as an MD at the University of Lithuania in Kovno (Kaunas). At a fairly young age, Dr. Lev Feldstein became a renowned surgeon in Kaunas, Lithuania. He married Sara, the youngest daughter of Esther Aronovsky, a successful business woman. They both were murdered in the holocaust. Their only daughter, Ada Levner, saved by Victoria and her sister Helena, who were the homemakers for the two Feldstein families. They were both devoted Catholics. Later, she became a doctor like her father. Dr. Levner later immigrated to Israel from the Soviet Union, and since the 1990s, lives in Canada.

His daughter, Esther (Toussia), studied economics in London. She married (Ika) Gilar Scheinberg, an engineer. Her husband served as a representative of Belgium in the Dutch East Indies. In the 1930s, Esther accompanied her husband to Medan, Sumatra (now Indonesia) where he built roads. In World War II, when the Japanese occupied the East Indies she became a political prisoner in the POW camp, Makassar, on the island of Celebes (now known as Sulawesi) (1942-1945). After the war, she divorced her husband, Gilar, and lived in Brussels. Two years later, she married Jean Loontjens, a Belgian businessman. Her health was in decline from years in the camp and she died on October 19, 1959, at the age of 46.

His youngest son, Yehoshua Feldstein (Prof. Joshua Feldstein), graduated from the Hebrew Reali Gymnasium in 1938, and began his studies at the School of Engineering at the University of Lithuania. A year after that, he immigrated to the United States to study agricultural science at the National Farm School in Doylestown, Pennsylvania. It was there that he began his academic career, later becoming president of Delaware Valley College, which evolved from the National Farm School.

Esther (Essie), granddaughter of Feldstein's wife's sister, became a Jewish-American author by the name of Esther Hautzig. She was the wife of Walter Hautzig, an internationally known concert pianist.
