= William L. Van Deburg =

American historian (born 1948)

- Born: May 8, 1948 (age 78); Kalamazoo, Michigan, U.S.

Academic background
- Education: Kalamazoo Central High School

Academic work
- Discipline: Afro-American Studies
- Institutions: University of Wisconsin–Madison

William L. Van Deburg (born May 8, 1948) was the Evjue-Bascom Professor of Afro-American Studies at the University of Wisconsin-Madison. He has written on antebellum slavery, on the history of black nationalism, and on contemporary African-American popular culture. Van Deburg retired from teaching in 2008 and is currently professor emeritus.

== Education ==
Born and raised in Kalamazoo, Michigan, Van Deburg graduated from Central High School in 1966. He received his B.A. cum laude with Honors in History from Western Michigan University in 1970 and was awarded a National Defense Education Act Fellowship to attend graduate school. He earned a Ph.D. in American History from Michigan State University in 1973, submitting a dissertation entitled: Rejected of Men: The Changing Religious Views of William Lloyd Garrison and Frederick Douglass.

== Career ==
After training with Russel B. Nye, a contributor to the development of American popular culture studies, at Michigan State, Van Deburg began teaching at the University of Wisconsin–Madison. Since 1973, he has worked to develop the field of Black Popular Culture Studies within the academy, utilizing pulp fiction, black cast film, and popular music as historical sources. He was chair of Wisconsin's Afro-American Studies department from 1981 to 1984 and was appointed Evjue-Bascom Professor in 2003.

== Selected works ==
=== Articles ===
- "Ulrich B. Phillips: Progress and the Conservative Historian," Georgia Historical Quarterly 55 (Fall 1971): 406-416 reprinted in Ulrich Bonnell Phillips: A Southern Historian and His Critics, ed. John David Smith and John C. Inscoe (Athens: University of Georgia Press, 1993).
- "Frederick Douglass: Maryland Slave to Religious Liberal," Maryland Historical Magazine 69 (Spring 1974): 27-43 reprinted in By These Hands: A Documentary History of African American Humanism, ed. Anthony B. Pinn (New York: New York University Press, 2001).
- "William Lloyd Garrison and the Pro-Slavery 'Priesthood'," Journal of the American Academy of Religion 43 (June 1975): 224–237.
- "Slave Drivers and Slave Narratives: A New Look at the 'Dehumanized Elite'," Historian 35 (August 1977): 717-732.
- "Elite Slave Behavior During the Civil War: Black Drivers and Foremen in Historiographical Perspective," Southern Studies 16 (Fall 1977): 253–269.
- "The Development of Black Historical Studies in American Higher Education," Canadian Review of American Studies 11 (Fall 1980): 175–191.
- "No Mere Mortals: Black Slaves and Black Power in American Literature, 1967-80," South Atlantic Quarterly 83 (Summer 1984): 297–311.
- "The Battleground of Historical Memory: Creating Alternative Culture Heroes in Postbellum America," Journal of Popular Culture 20 (Summer 1986): 49–62.
- "Villains, Demons, and Social Bandits: White Fear of the Black Cultural Revolution," in Media, Culture, and the Modern African American Freedom Struggle, ed. Brian Ward (Gainesville: University Press of Florida, 2001).

=== Books ===
- The Slave Drivers: Black Agricultural Labor Supervisors in the Antebellum South (Westport: Greenwood Press, 1979; New York: Oxford University Press, 1988).
- Slavery and Race in American Popular Culture (Madison: University of Wisconsin Press, 1984).
- New Day in Babylon: The Black Power Movement and American Culture, 1965-1975 (Chicago: University of Chicago Press, 1992).
- Black Camelot: African-American Culture Heroes in Their Times, 1960-1980 (Chicago: University of Chicago Press, 1997).
- Hoodlums: Black Villains and Social Bandits in American Life (Chicago: University of Chicago Press, 2004)

=== Edited Collections ===
- Modern Black Nationalism: From Marcus Garvey to Louis Farrakhan (New York: New York University Press, 1997).
- African American Nationalism in the Schomburg Studies on the Black Experience series (Ann Arbor: ProQuest, 2005).

== Personal life ==
Van Deburg is married (1989–present) to Diane Sommers, an artist and systems analyst. He was previously married (1967–1988) to Alice J. Honeywell, an editor. His family includes two daughters and two sons. He lives in Lake Oswego, Oregon.
