= Ruth Feldstein =

American historian

Ruth Sara Feldstein
- Born: Ruth Sara Feldstein; United States
- Education: University of Pennsylvania (B.A. in Arts; Brown University (M.A. and Ph.D. in HistoryPh.D.)
- Occupation: Historian
- Works: How It Feels to Be Free: Black Women Entertainers and the Civil Rights Movement (2013)

Ruth Sara Feldstein is an American historian with research interests in United States history; her work focuses on 20th-century culture and politics; women's and gender history; and African American history. Currently she is professor of history and American studies at Rutgers University.

== Education ==
Feldstein earned B.A. in arts (1986) from the University of Pennsylvania (magna cum laude). M.A. in history (1989) from Brown University. Ph.D. in history (1996) from Brown.

== Work ==
In her book Motherhood in Black and White: Race and Sex in American Liberalism, 1930-1965 (Cornell, 2000) she traces the history of liberalism between the eras of the New Deal and Great Society, and argues that central to its development were conservative gender ideologies, which perpetuated the stereotypes of bad mothering by domineering "black matriarchs" and bad white "moms".

Her article about Nina Simone earned her the Letitia Woods Brown Memorial Prize, Best Article on Black Women's History.

Her book How It Feels to Be Free: Black Women Entertainers and the Civil Rights Movement (2013), in which she explores the influence of women entertainers (Lena Horne, Miriam Makeba, Nina Simone, Abbey Lincoln, Diahann Carroll, Cicely Tyson) on the civil rights and feminist movements, won the Benjamin Hooks National Book Award and the International Association for Media History's Michael Nelson Prize.

== Personal life ==
In 1990, Feldstein married Asa Nixon, a doctor.
