= Mark Feldstein =

American artist and photographer

Mark Feldstein (May 3, 1937 – October 2001), was an American artist and photographer best known for his large format photography of the streetlife and architecture of New York City.

Feldstein, whose parents were German Jews, often remarked that he just happened to be born in Milan, where his family were located during their emigration from Nazi Germany to the United States. He grew up in New York City and earned art degrees from Hunter College where he studied with Robert Motherwell.

Around 1970, after ten years as a painter, he turned to photography. He later joined the Hunter College faculty as a photography professor, teaching along with Roy DeCarava.

He created the scenic photography for the Broadway musical, The Tap Dance Kid, which ran from December 21, 1983, through August 11, 1985

== Bibliography ==
- Unseen New York. Mineola, New York: Dover. 1975. ISBN 0-486-20166-X
- Sightings. New York: Chelsea House, 1977. ISBN 0-87754-053-5
