= Abeng (newspaper) =

Weekly newspaper published in Jamaica

Abeng (stylized in all capital letters) was a weekly newspaper published in Kingston, Jamaica. It started as a response to the protests movement that emerged after the banning of African-Guyanese historian Walter Rodney from the campus of the University of the West Indies, Mona. It was published from January to October 1969. Abeng was dedicated to the issues of Black and Caribbean consciousness awareness, and the editorial bent was severely critical of both Jamaican political parties.

The editors included George Beckford, Robert Hill, Rupert Lewis and Trevor Munroe.
