= Almanach (album) =

Studio album by Malicorne
- Released: September 1976
- Recorded: Spring 1976
- Studio: Studio Acousti, Saint-Germain-des-Prés, Paris
- Genre: Folk, progressive rock, traditional folk
- Length: 42:37
- Label: Hexagone / Griffin

Malicorne chronology
Malicorne 2, Le Mariage anglais (1975)	Almanach (1976)	Malicorne 4 (1978)

Almanach is a traditional folk album by Malicorne, released in 1976 on the Griffin label. As before, it has a complex sound. The arrival of Hughes de Courson gives the album a more classical feel.

Consisting of mainly traditional French songs, the album contains twelve songs to reflect the twelve months of the year. Gabriel Yacoub attempted to highlight the spiritual basis of the traditional songs in this album by associating them with the ceremonial customs throughout the year. The original gatefold LP came with an 8-page booklet detailing these "magical practices".

In November 1977, Almanach achieved gold by selling 100,000 copies.

The 2000 CD reissue added a thirteenth track.

== Track listing ==
All songs traditional except where noted. All songs arranged by the band.

Side one

1. "Salut à la compagnie" – 0:55
2. "Quand j'étais chez mon père" – 3:39
3. "Margot" (Gabriel Yacoub) – 0:56
4. "Les tristes noces" – 7:42
5. "Voici venir le joli mai" – 0:24
6. "Voici la Saint Jean (ronde)" – 3:10
7. "Le luneux" – 4:58

Side two

8. "Branle de la haie" (Trad., Malicorne) – 2:05
9. "Quand je menai mes chevaux boire" – 4:36
10. "La fille au cresson" – 3:37
11. "L'écolier assassin" – 8:35
12. "Noël est arrivé" – 2:00

2000 CD reissue bonus track

13. "La fiancée du timbalier" (lyrics: Victor Hugo; music: Trad.) – 5:45

== Personnel ==
- Gabriel Yacoub – acoustic and electric guitar, mandolin, vocals)
- Marie Yacoub – electric dulcimer, bouzouki, hurdy-gurdy, Epinette des Vosges, psaltery, vocals)
- Laurent Vercambre – violin, cello, keyboards, mandolin, vocals)
- Hughes de Courson – bass, crumhorn, flute a bec, percussion, vocals)
- Oliver Zdrzalik – bass, keyboards, vocals
- "La Bamboche" on "Les Tristes Noces" – guest group
