= Malicorne 1 =

Album by Malicorne

Studio album by Malicorne
- Released: October 1974
- Recorded: Spring 1974
- Studio: Studio Acousti, Paris, France
- Genre: Folk, Celtic
- Length: 38:49
- Label: Hexagone

Malicorne chronology
Pierre de Grenoble (1973)	Malicorne 1 (1974)	Malicorne 2 (1975)

Malicorne (aka Malicorne 1 or Colin) is the debut studio album by Malicorne, released in October 1974. It is sometimes referred to as Colin because the album is simply called "Malicorne" and because "Colin" is the first (and last) track.

== Content ==
The absence of any rock drummer and the complexity of the sound makes it closer to folk music than rock music.

== Track listing ==
All tracks are traditionals, arrangements: Malicorne – except for "La Pernette" (lyrics: trad.; music: Gabriel Yacoub; arrangements: Malicorne)

1. "Colin" – 1:02^{[a]}
2. "Dame Lombarde" – 3:11^{[f]}
3. "La Pernette" – 7:07^{[e]}
4. "Les Filles sont volages / Ronde" – 3:23^{[g]}
5. "La Fille soldat" – 3:59^{[h]}
6. "Landry" – 4:07 ^{[i]}
7. "Le Chant des livrées" – 3:04^{[a]}
8. "Bourrée" – 2:26^{[b]}
9. "Réveillez-vous belle endormie / Branle poitevin" – 3:49^{[c]}
10. "Le Deuil d'amour" – 5:38)^{[d]}
11. "Colin" – 0:57^{[a]}

Notes

- ^{^[a]} – Traditional from the Berry province.
- ^{^[b]} – Traditional from the Limousin region.
- ^{^[c]} – Traditional from the Berry province. The branle was learnt from Serge Soulet, a "veuze" bagpipes player from the Poitou province.
- ^{^[d]} – Traditional; most of the lyrics and melodies originate from "Belle je me suis levé", a song from the Québec province.
- ^{^[e]} – Traditional from the Dauphiné province / Gabriel Yacoub
- ^{^[f]} – Traditional from the Cantal; adaptation of a Piedmont song; Hughes de Courson on lead vocals
- ^{^[g]} – Traditional from the Québec province; the ronde is a Picardy version of the song "La Belle est au jardin d'amour"
- ^{^[h]} – Traditional from the Savoie region; the melody is the one from "Réveillez-vous Picards"
- ^{^[i]} – Traditional from the Savoie region

== Personnel ==
=== Malicorne ===
- Gabriel Yacoub – acoustic and electric guitar, Epinette des Vosges, lead vocals (on "Les Filles sont volages", "La Fille soldat", "Landry", "Le Chant des livrées", "Réveillez-vous belle endormie", "Le Deuil d'amour")
- Marie Yacoub – electric dulcimer, bouzouki, hurdy-gurdy, lead vocals (on "La Pernette", "Landry", "Le Chant des livrées", "Réveillez-vous belle endormie")
- Laurent Vercambre – violin, bouzouki, psaltry, harmonium, mandolin, vocals
- Hughes de Courson – electric guitar, bass, crumhorn, percussion, vocals (lead vocals on "Dame Lombarde")

=== Production ===
- Nic Kinsey – recording engineer
- Clément Ziegler – recording engineer
- Irina Ionesco – photo
- Albert Riou – artwork
