= Malicorne 2 =

le Mariage anglais

Studio album by Malicorne
- Released: November 1975
- Recorded: Spring 1975
- Studio: Studio Acousti, Paris, France
- Genre: Folk
- Length: 42:02
- Label: Hexagone – Catalogue No 883 004 (distributed by WEA)

Malicorne chronology
Malicorne 1 (1974)	le Mariage anglais (1975)	Almanach (1976)

Malicorne (a.k.a. Malicorne 2 or Le Mariage anglais) is the second studio album by Malicorne, released in November 1975 on the Hexagone label and distributed by WEA. It is sometimes referred to as Le Mariage anglais because the album is simply called "Malicorne" and "Le Mariage anglais" is the first track.

== Track listing ==
All songs are traditional, arrangements by Malicorne – except for "La Fille aux chansons (Marion s'y promène)": trad.; 2nd movement composed by Malicorne).

1. Le Mariage anglais – 4:06 (a song originating from Normandy; exact date unknown; the final tune is the "Domino fidelium", a Gregorian motet from the École de Notre-Dame)
2. Le Garçon jardinier – 2:52 (from the Bas-Berry province)
3. La Fille aux chansons (Marion s'y promène) – 10:26 (a common lament in Île-de-France, in the whole west part of France and in the Québec province; exact source unknown; 2nd movement composed by Malicorne)
4. J'ai vu le loup, le renard et la belette (instrumental) – 2:29 (a two-time bourrée from Haute-Auvergne)
5. Cortège de noce – 4:08 (from the Franche-Comté region)
6. Branle – La Péronnelle – 4:31 (1st track from the Poitou province – 2nd track from the Dauphiné province and the Savoie region)
7. Le Galant indiscret – 2:19 (from La Châtre, Bas-Berry)
8. "Marions les roses (chant de quête)" 3:30 (a song of the quest for the eggs in the time of Easter)
9. "Suite : Bourrée, Scottish-valse" 2:27 (an instrumental from the regions of the Centre of France)
10. "Le Bouvier" - 5:14 (the lyrics are an adaptation in French from the langue d'oc)

== Personnel ==
- Gabriel Yacoub – acoustic and electric guitar, épinette des Vosges, vocals
- Marie Yacoub – electric dulcimer, bouzouki, hurdy-gurdy, vocals
- Laurent Vercambre – violin, bouzouki, psaltery, harmonium, mandolin, vocals
- Hughes de Courson – electric guitar, bass, crumhorn, percussion, vocals.

== Uses in media ==
The album's closing track "Le Bouvier" was sampled by Four Tet on "As Serious As Your Life", from the 2003 album Rounds.
