= Drone zither =

Stringed instrument in the zither family

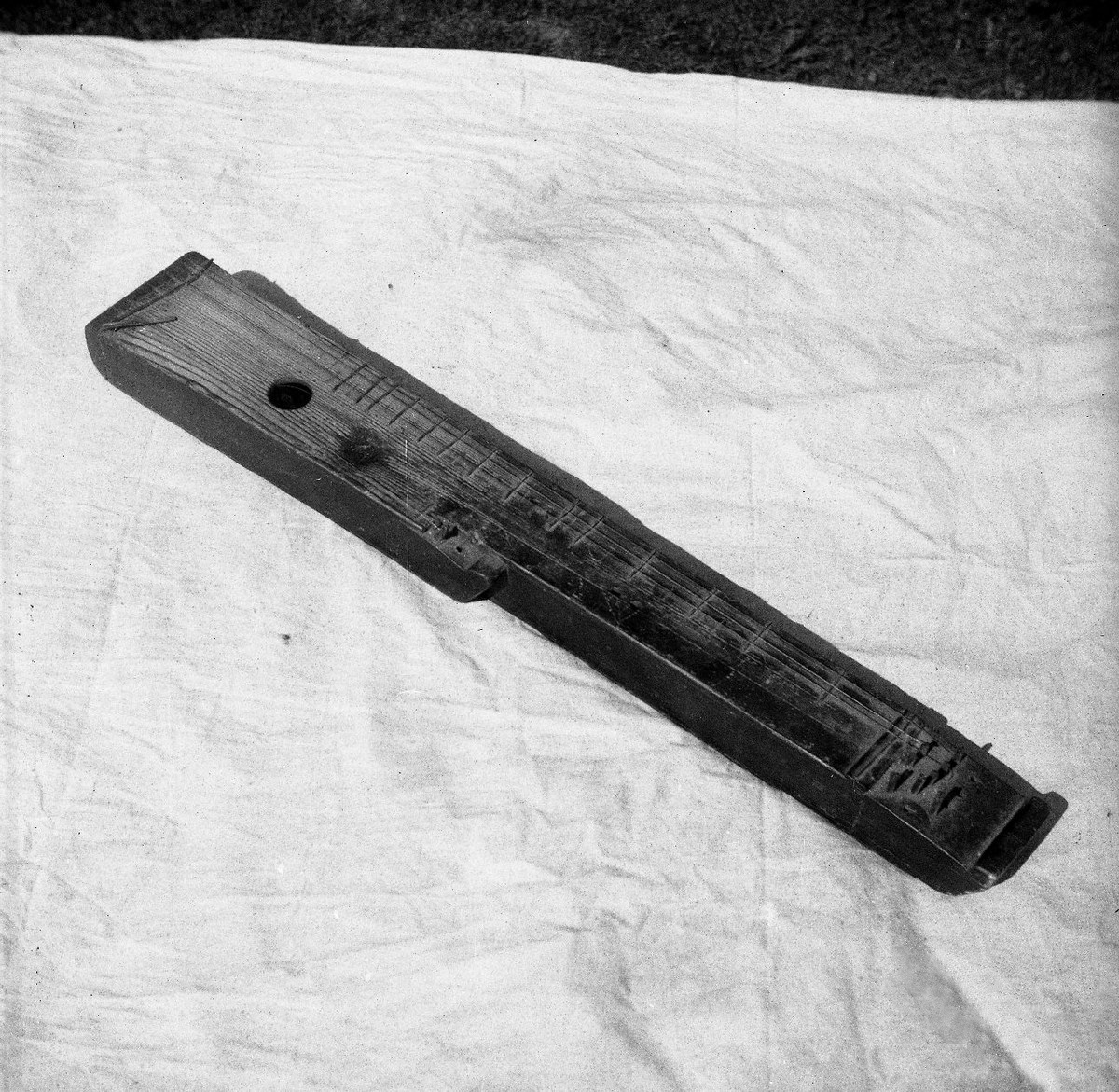
Drone zither from Glogovica (central Slovenia)

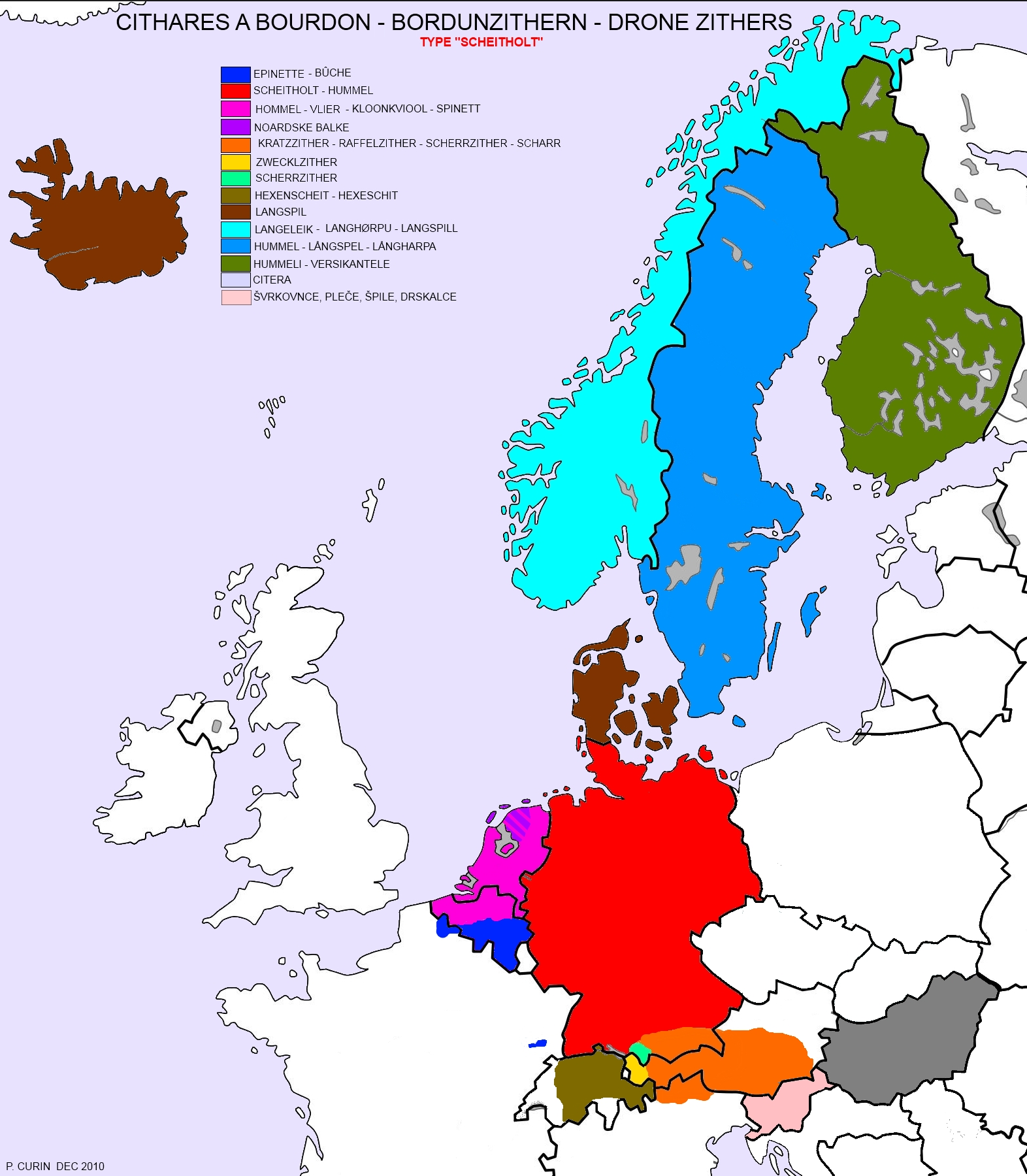
Drone zithers in Europe, type "Scheitholt"

Drone zithers or droned zithers are stringed instruments of the zither family that have few (sometimes only one) melodic strings and a greater number of drone strings. The oldest known form of drone zither is the Scheitholt.

The Scheitholt developed into many different variants of drone zithers, such as the Langspil, the Epinette des Vosges or the Hummel. The Appalachian dulcimer is a traditional American form.
