= Hexagram (disambiguation) =

A hexagram is a star made of two superimposed equilateral triangles.

Hexagram may also refer to:

- Hexagram (currency), a large silver coin of the Byzantine Empire
- Hexagram (I Ching), the sets of 6 solid or broken lines used in the I Ching
- "Hexagram" (song), a song by Deftones
- Star of David, a Jewish symbol
  - Seal of Solomon, a magic object or symbol
- Shatkona, a symbol used in Hindu yantra
- A (pre-printed or hand stamped) symbol used by the Dead Letter Office on an envelope to indicate valuable contents
- Centered-hexagram, a figurate, 6-pointed 'Star' number

== See also ==
- Unicursal hexagram, a six-pointed star that can be drawn as one complete symbol
- Hexagon (disambiguation)
