= Bacchu-ber =

The bacchu-ber (French: [ba.ky.bɛʁ]), derived from Occitan bau cubèrt (Occitan: [baw ky'bɛʁ], covered dance or indoor ball), is a traditional folk dance performed with swords. This dance takes place in the district of Pont-de-Cervières, city of Briançon (Hautes-Alpes, France). Its origin dates back to many centuries ago (first written confirmation in 1730). This folk dance is unique in France and is one of the rare sword dances that have stood the test of time. It is performed once a year on 16 August, day of Saint Roch (1340–1379), patron of the Pont-de-Cervières district. Similar shows are performed on the Italian side of the Cottian Alps, notably in San Giorio, Fenestrelle and Giaglione villages.

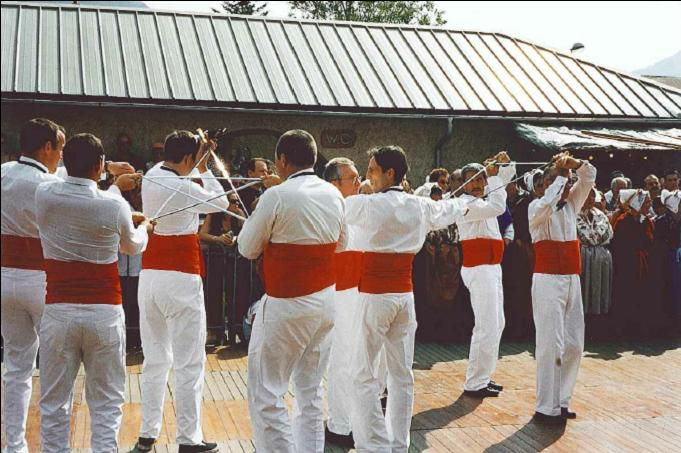
The Bacchu-ber, 16 August 2003

== Origins ==
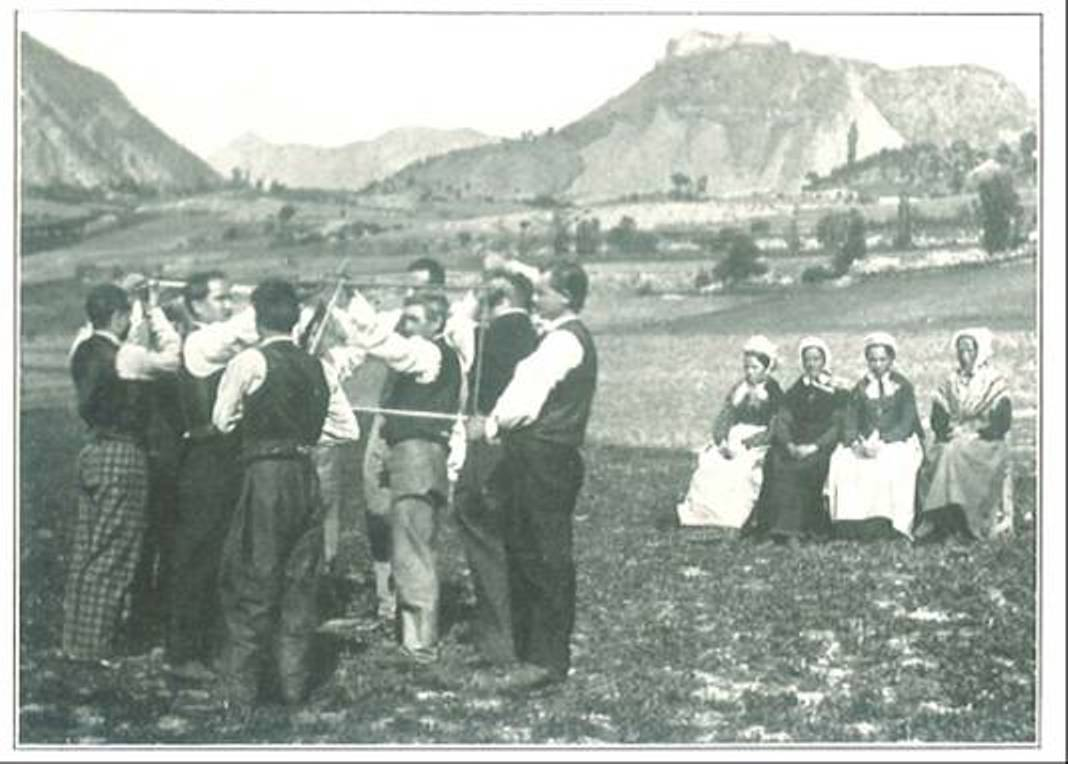
Bacchu-bert rehearsal, 1877

The origin of the dance is almost impossible to determine: it might be a dance of Celtic, Roman, Greek, Flemish, etc. origin. One could argue that the name of this dance evokes the god Bacchus but this remains unproven.

As the dance is performed on the feast-day of Saint Roch, who is traditionally invoked in times of plague, some experts argue that survivors of the plague in Pont-de-Cervières would have chosen this Saint as patron of their district. However, there has never been any mention of a vow being made to perform a special dance on this particular saint's day.

== Description ==
The dance is performed by 9 male dancers who are dressed in white with a small bow tie, a large red cummerbund around the waist and black dancing pumps. The men form a circle, nod to each other and move and interlock their swords in geometrical patterns.

Each man holds the point of the sword of another dancer and the hilt of his own. All dance at a sliding rhythmic pace (a series of 3 small steps). Raising the swords, and passing under them, they form various shapes such as 3 triangles, a rectangle and a star, 2 rectangles, a star and a triangle, etc.

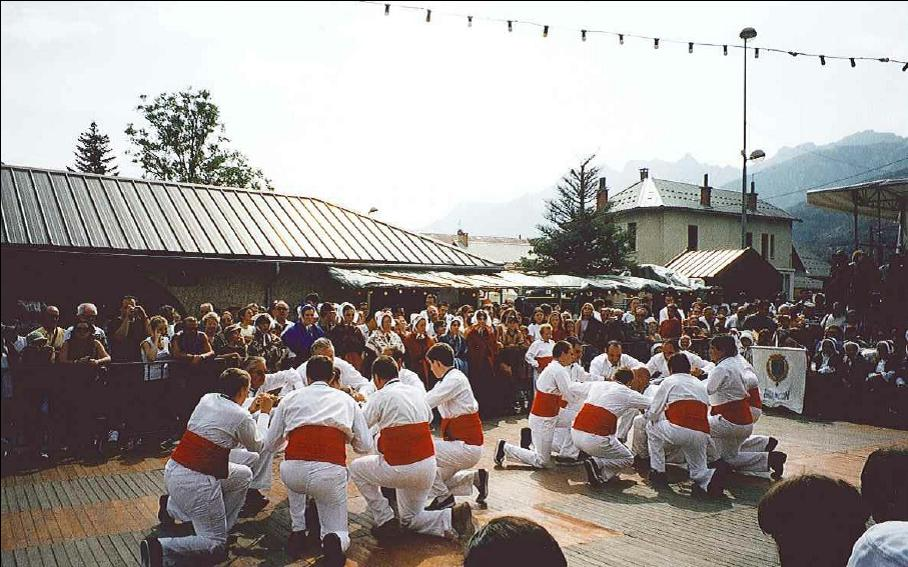
The Bacchu-ber:la lève; 16 August 2003

The final form, called « la lève », is composed of a circle of dancers, one of them being at the centre, with the swords interlocked around his neck. All dancers kneel down simultaneously and all rise together several times. In the summer of 1936 Albert Lebrun, President of the French Republic, attended a performance of the dance.

During both world wars the Bacchu-ber was not performed.

In 2003, for a commemoration, the Bacchu-ber was exceptionally performed by 2 circles of dancers (usually only one).

== Song of the dance ==
The performance is accompanied by a repetitive song consisting of meaningless "scat" syllables commonly called the "Dratanla". It is sung by about 10 women wearing the traditional clothing of Pont-de-Cervières. Women usually sing seated on a bench but have been known to sing standing up.

The traditional clothing is composed of a white cotton bonnet with a knot under the chin, a shawl worn over a blouse and a dark grey skirt (with small Provence patterns) with an elastic around the waist. An apron is tied over the skirt and holds the shawl in place.

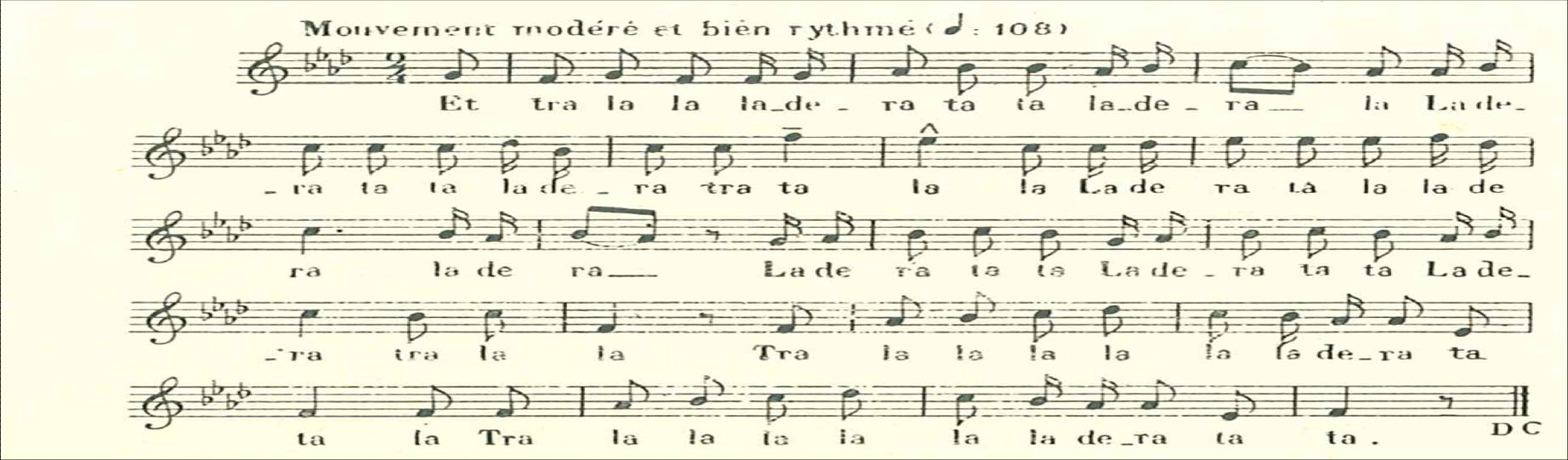
The Bacchu-ber song, 1895

Approximate current words of the song:

La dratanla la dra, la dratanla, la
La dratanla, la dra, la dratanla,
Et dralala, la dratanla, la dra la,
La dratanla, la dratata la dra,
La dratanla, la dra,
La dratanla, la dratanla, la dra, la la dra.

== Dancing venue ==
The dance is usually performed twice on a lower wooden stage and lasts about 20 minutes. The first performance is given at the top of the Pont-de-Cervières village, on the Church Square (where stands the Church Saint Roch & Saint Marcellus). Then dancers, singers and audience walk down the Bacchu-ber Street to reach the Jean Jaurès Square where the dance is performed a second time.

In older times, the dance was performed three times.

== Associations ==
Founded in 1935, the Society of the Bacchu-ber Admirers manages the organisation of the event. The current President is Frédéric Arnaud.

== Publications ==
- Abel Hugo, La France pittoresque, ou Description pittoresque, topographique et statistique des départements et colonies de la France... avec des notes sur les langues, idiomes et patois... et des renseignements statistiques... accompagnée de la statistique générale de la France..., Paris, Delloye, 1835 (chapter Hautes-Alpes, page 354).
- Paul Guillemin, "Le Bacchu-ber, essai historique et archéologique", Bulletin de la section lyonnaise, n° 1, 1878, imprimerie de Pitrat aîné, Club Alpin français.
- Julien Tiersot, Chansons populaires des Alpes françaises, Grenoble, H. Falque et F. Perrin, Librairie dauphinoise; Moutiers, François Ducloz, Librairie Savoyarde, 1903, 549 p.
- Raphaël Blanchard, Le ba'cubert : l'art populaire dans le Briançonnais, Librairie ancienne Honoré Champion, 1914, 90 p.
- Violet Alford, « The Baccubert », in Journal of the English Folk Dance and Song Society, Francis Bacon Society, p. 8-15, 1940,222 pages.
- Fernand-Henri Carlhian, Folklore briançonnais. Le Bacchu-ber conservé à Pont-de-Cervières : une danse des épées... une survivance du culte de Bacchus, 1959.
- Steve Corrsin, "Sword Dancing in Europe: A History", Tradition Series, no. 3. Enfield Lock: Hisarlik Press for the Folklore Society, 1997, 256 pages, ISBN 978-1-874312-25-3
- Claude Muller, Les Mystères du Dauphiné, Edition De Borée, 2001, p. 138-142.ISBN 2844940862, ISBN 978-2-84494-086-5
- Marc de Ribois et André Carénini (éd.), Le Bacchu-ber et les danses des épées dans les Alpes occidentales, Edisud, 2005 ISBN 978-2-85744-895-2.
- Jeremy Carter-Gordon Bacchu-ber Sword Dance

== Adaptations ==
An instrumental adaptation under this very title "Bacchu-ber" is available on the 1977 (fourth) studio album Malicorne 4 by French folk group Malicorne.
