= Gabriel Yacoub =

French musician (1952–2025)

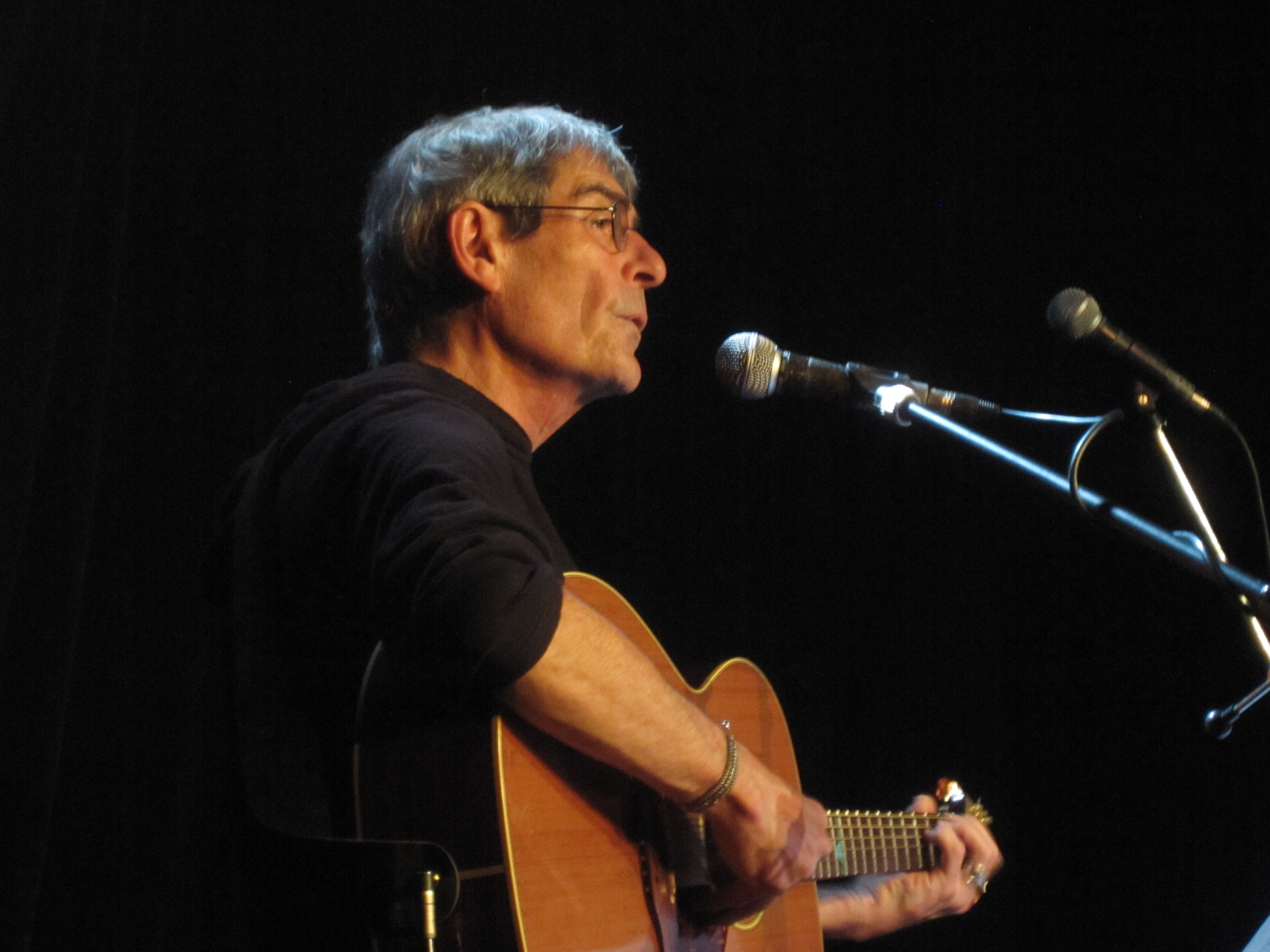
- Yacoub performing in 2011

Background information
- Born: 4 February 1952; Paris, France
- Died: 22 January 2025 (aged 72) Bourges, France
- Genres: Celtic music, Breton Music
- Occupations: Singer; songwriter; composer; musician
- Years active: 1971–2017
- Labels: Le Roseau
- Spouse: Marie Sauvet
- Website: gabrielyacoub.com

Gabriel Yacoub (4 February 1952 – 22 January 2025) was a French musician and visual artist. He was a lead member of the French folk and folk rock band Malicorne from its formation in 1973, as a pioneer of the revival of traditional music in contemporary formats. He later also played and recorded solo music, including to his own lyrics.

== Life and career ==
Yacoub was born in Paris on 4 February 1952 to a Lebanese father and a French mother. His early musical interests, in the 1960s, was American folk music, first by Bob Dylan, then by Woody Guthrie and real American traditional music. He was inspired, but looked for something with French cultural roots. He became a guitarist and singer with the group of harpist Alan Stivell who introduced him to traditional Breton music and toured France in 1971.

Before founding Malicorne, Gabriel and his then wife Marie Sauvet recorded the experimental album Pierre de Grenoble in 1973. This was originally intended to be the name of the group. It included contributions from Breton guitarist-singer Dan Ar Braz. In 1973, they co-founded Malicorne, to revive traditional French music and combined modern instruments, including guitar, electric guitar and bass guitar, with traditional instruments such as bagpipes, hurdy-gurdy and krumhorns. Gabriel played guitars, mandolin, Epinette des Vosges and banjo, while Marie played electric dulcimer, bouzouki and hurdy-gurdy. They made a number of successful albums, of which the 1976 Almanach was regarded as the most popular.

In 1978, Yacoub recorded a solo album called Trad. Arr., which featured English fiddler Barry Dransfield as guest; he played traditional French tunes with acoustic guitar, and began to write and compose original songs.

After disbanding for the first time, at the end of 1981, Malicorne reformed in different configurations in 1984, in 1986 and again from 1987 to 1989. The group played in its original line-up for a single concert on 15 July 2010, in La Rochelle and finally, in November 2011, with a new line-up. In August 2017, a concert in Paimpol, as part of the Sea Shanty Festival, was the band's last appearance.

In 1986, the final year of Malicorne, Yacoub recorded Elementary Level of Faith, an album of electric folk-rock, with the Hungarian composer Ivan Lantos and the singer and keyboardist Nikki Matheson. In 1990, his next album, Bel, was back to acoustic guitar. It features a string quartet as well as bagpipes played by Jean-Pierre Rasle (who had previously recorded, from 1982 to 1983, with the Albion Band). Yacoub toured as a duo with Marie in 1990. In 1994 he released Quatre, featuring an orchestra and a choir. He worked with fiddler Nathalie Riviere and bassist Yannick Hardouin from 1998.

In February 1995, he performed at the Palais des Sports, in Paris, opening for Bernard Lavilliers, and in May that year at La Cigale.

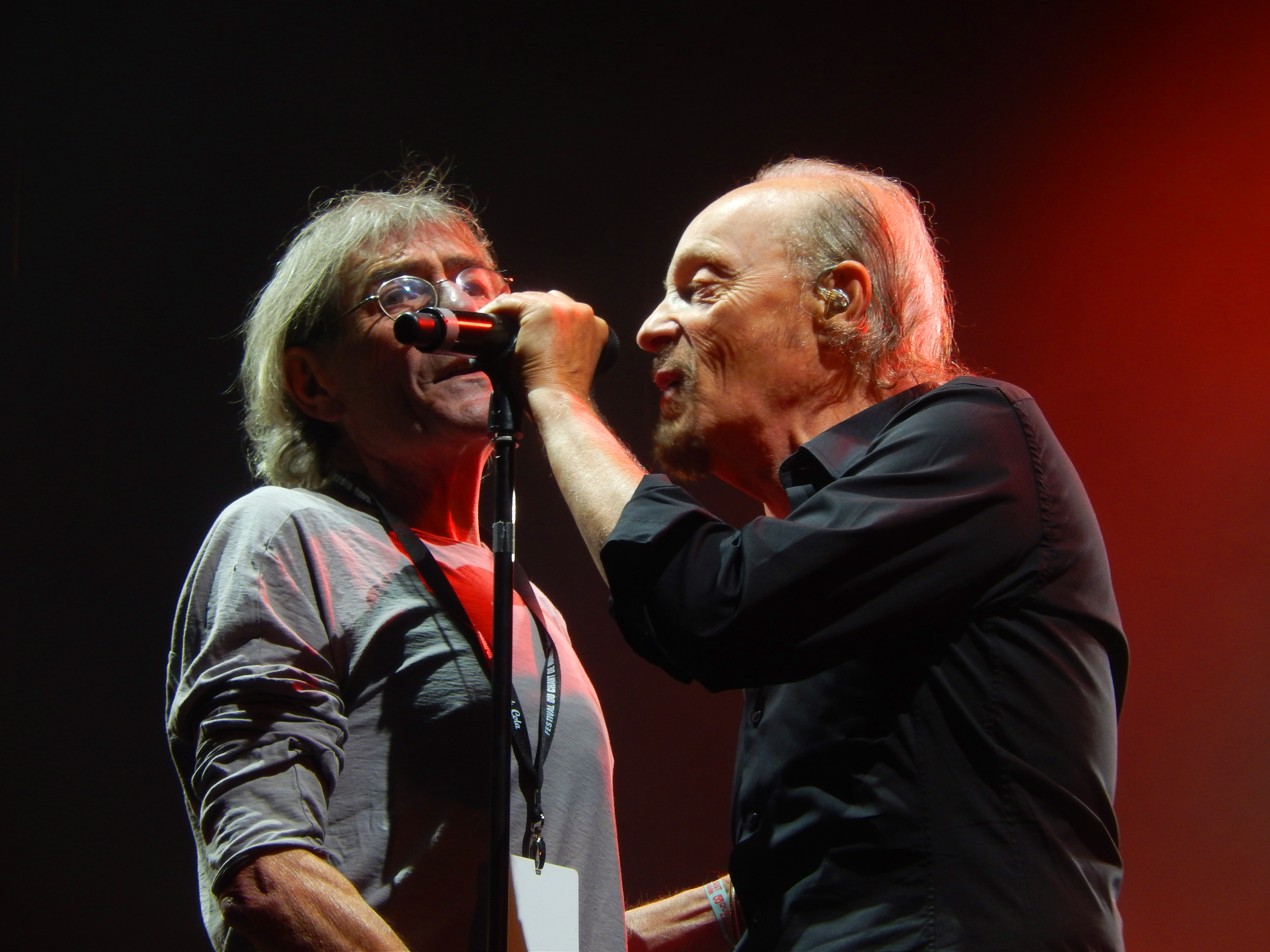
Yacoub with Alan Stivell, August 2017

In 2002, he wrote a book of poetry and lyrics, called Les choses les plus simples ("The simplest things"), distributed by Harmonia Mundi and recorded an album of his own songs in English, The Simple Things We Said.

In July 2013, Yacoub was honoured as an officer of the Ordre des Arts et des Lettres.

Yacoub died after a long illness at a hospital in Bourges on 22 January 2025, at the age of 72.

== Discography ==
Yacoub made many recordings, with Marie Yacoub (before, during and after Malicorne), as lead singer and musician with Malicorne, and solo, including:

=== Gabriel and Marie Yacoub ===
- Pierre de Grenoble (1973)

=== Malicorne ===
see also Malicorne discography

- Malicorne, aka Colin (1974)
- Malicorne, aka Malicorne 2 and Le Mariage anglais (1975)
- Almanach (1976).
- Malicorne, aka Malicorne 4 and Nous sommes chanteurs de sornettes (1977)
- Quintessence (compilation, 1977)

=== Solo ===
- Trad. Arr. (1978)
- Elementary Level of Faith (1987)
- Bel (1990)
- Quatre (1994)
- Babel (1997)
- Tri (compilation) (1999)
- Yacoub (2001)
- The Simple Things We Said (2002)
- Je vois venir... (2004)
- De la nature des choses (2008)
