= Marie Sauvet =

French musician (1952–2025)

- Born: 5 February 1953 (age 72); Meudon, France
- Genres: Celtic music, Breton Music
- Occupations: Singer; musician
- Spouse: Gabriel Yacoub (died 2025)

Marie Sauvet (born 5 February 1953) is a French musician. She was a founder and lead performer, singing and playing several instruments, of the band Malicorne from its formation in 1973, as a pioneer of the revival of traditional music in contemporary formats. She is also known as Marie Yacoub and Marie de Malicorne

== Life and career ==
Sauvet was born in Meudon on 5 February 1953. She met Gabriel Yacoub, who had been interested first in American folk music of Bob Dylan, Woody Guthrie and real American traditional music but became interested in traditional French music.

Before founding Malicorne, she and Gabriel Yacoub recorded the experimental album Pierre de Grenoble in 1973. This was originally intended to be the name of the group. It included contributions from Breton guitarist-singer Dan Ar Braz. In 1973 they co-founded Malicorne, to revive traditional French music and combined modern instruments, including guitar, electric guitar and bass guitar, with traditional instruments such as bagpipes, hurdy-gurdy and krumhorns. Marie played electric dulcimer, bouzouki and hurdy-gurdy, while Gabriel played guitars, mandolin, Epinette des Vosges and banjo. They made a number of successful albums, of which the 1976 Almanach was regarded as the most popular.

After disbanding for the first time, at the end of 1981, Malicorne reformed in different configurations in 1984, in 1986 and again from 1987 to 1989. The group played in its original line-up for a single concert on 15 July 2010, in La Rochelle. In August 2017, a concert in Paimpol, as part of the Festival du chant de marin de Paimpol (Shanty Festival), was the band's last appearance.

== Discography ==
Sauvet made many recordings, some as Marie Yakoub, many with Gabriel Yacoub (before, during and after Malicorne), as lead singer and musician with Malicorne.

=== Gabriel and Marie Yacoub ===
- Pierre de Grenoble (1973)

=== Malicorne ===
see also Malicorne discography

- Malicorne, aka Colin (1974)
- Malicorne, aka Malicorne 2 and Le Mariage anglais (1975)
- Almanach (1976).
- Malicorne, aka Malicorne 4 and Nous sommes chanteurs de sornettes (1977)
- Quintessence (compilation, 1977)
