= Gravity Studios =

American recording studio in Chicago, Illinois

Coordinates: 41°54′37″N 87°41′03″W

- Industry: Audio Recording
- Genre: Various (alt rock, indie rock, singer-songwriter, jazz, hip-hop, R&B, grunge, etc.)
- Founded: August 1, 1993; 33 years ago in Chicago, United States
- Founder: Doug McBride
- Headquarters: Chicago, Illinois, United States
- Key people: Ramsey Valentyn (Studio Manager); Daniel Farnsworth (Senior Audio Engineer); Dylan Walker (Assistant Manager); Danny Patt (Staff Engineer)
- Services: Recording studio, Music Production
- Owner: Doug McBride
- Website: gravitystudios.com

Gravity Studios is a recording studio in Chicago, Illinois founded in 1993 by Doug McBride. Starting with the single "Seether" by local band Veruca Salt, Gravity has hosted bands such as the Plain White T's, Silversun Pickups, and Fall Out Boy.

An adjacent mastering studio, Gravity Mastering, has been used by bands and producers throughout United States.

== History ==
Gravity Studios was founded by music producer/engineer Doug McBride in 1993, in Wicker Park neighborhood of Chicago, Illinois. McBride left his job at Chicago Recording Company to manage the new recording studio, and picked Wicker Park because it was an inexpensive area to afford practice space, and also its central position in the local alt rock scene. He has stated, "[Wicker Park] was primarily composed of a bunch of starving musicians hanging out, going to each other’s shows, and influencing each other musically."

"We’ve modeled Gravity after places like Sound City in Van Nuys, Fort Apache in Boston, and even Ultrasuede, John Curely’s place, in Cinci. It just felt good to be there, to be in those places."
– Founder Doug McBride

The first band McBride encountered after finishing construction was Veruca Salt, who he met through friends before they’d played their first show. He recommended they record their single "Seether" at Gravity, and the song went on to become popular at Chicago's Q101, and propelled the band to a deal with Geffen.

Local bands such as Verbow, Dovetail Joint and Jamie Blake soon started coming to Gravity for production and recording. The Smashing Pumpkins spent two weeks with McBride, which contributed to the creation of their album Pisces Iscariot. Through the late 1990s the studio began booking major label clients, producing recordings such as Rachael Yamagata’s "Collide", Fall Out Boy, Rise Against, and Badly Drawn Boy. McBride has stated, "I suppose Gravity found a niche as the place to go to get a big, warm, organic sound."

In 2000 Gravity began construction on an adjacent B studio, which was offered at a lower price, allowing bands with smaller budgets to record. Some of the engineers and producers who have worked at Gravity include John Agnello, Mitch Easter, Jim O’Rourke, Peter Mokran, Mike Clink, Bob Mould, Brad Wood, and Bill Stevenson.

On August 14, 2006 Silversun Pickups recorded new material at Gravity, which was released as The Tripwire sessions: Live in Chicago. Recent clients include Filligar, Anna Fermin, and Lee De Wyze.

As of August 2013, services include, but are not limited to, producing, tracking, mixing, mastering, forensic audio, noise reduction, drum editing and sample replacement, vocal tuning, re-amping, rock band programming, and mix consultation. McBride also taught recording for Tribeca Flashpoint Media Arts Academy.

Since 2025, Gravity celebrated over 32 years of audio recording and continues to work with local, national, and international artists, producing albums and singles for label artists and bands as well as independent artists and bands. Gravity now also works with composition and arrangement for scores, voice recording/ADR, and audio engineering within the video game, film, and television industries having worked with Adult Swim, and Epic Games, The Discovery Channel, and many independent productions.

== Gear ==
By the late 1990s Gravity had a vintage 1976 Neve 8058 console, which McBride says was the only one in Chicago. The console had spent the late '70s at Automated Sound in New York, recording albums such as Steely Dan's Aja. In October 2008 it was announced the studio had installed a Rupert Neve Designs 5088 Console. As of July 2009 the studio uses Pro Tools, often in conjunction with analog gear and a vintage Neve 5315 console

As of September 2013, instruments include a five-piece DW Drum Kit, a Fender Jazz Bass, a Fender Telecaster, and a Gold Tone Paul Beard Signature Dobro. Recorders include Pro Tools 10 HD Native, a Tascam 122 MKIII Cassette Deck, and a Sony PCM-2600 DAT. Outboard Gear includes a Shadow Hills Dual Vandergraph and a Shadow Hills Mono Optograph.

Since 2024, Gravity keeps their gear inventory available through their personal website as pieces are constantly being updated https://www.gravitystudios.com/gear

== Mastering ==
In 2005 McBride opened a second studio, Gravity Mastering, adjacent in the same building. Among Gravity Mastering's first clients were Augustana, Building Rome, Filligar, Mirror Mirror, Showoff, Jim Peterik, and The Days.

== Artists ==
Artists that have worked at Gravity Studios include: Veruca Salt, The Smashing Pumpkins, Atari Teenage riot, Rod Stewart, Fall Out Boy, Hawthorne Heights, Silversun Pickups, The Walkmen, Rachael Yamagata, Umphrey's McGee, Tub Ring, Motion City Soundtrack, Kasabian, Dashboard Confessional, Ben Kweller, Less Than Jake, Rise Against, Buddy Guy, Live, Verbow, As Tall As Lions, Augustana, Badly Drawn Boy, Company of Thieves, Enuff Z'Nuff, Filligar, Kill Hannah, Lucky Boys Confusion, Urge Overkill, Skillet, Spitalfield, You vs Yesterday, Shea Couleé, Brad Peterson and Story of the Year.

== Staff ==
- Doug McBride: Founder, Producer, Chief Engineer
- Ramsey Valentyn: Manager, Producer, Songwriter
- Daniel Farnsworth: Senior Engineer, Producer
- Dylan Walker: Assistant Manager, Engineer, Producer
- Daniel Patt: Engineer, Producer
- CJ Alexander: Engineer, Producer
- Raina Villareal: Engineer, Producer
- Andrew Hawk: Engineer

== Discography ==
Year	Artist	Title	Notes
1993	Veruca Salt	"Seether," demo	Production, engineering
2005	Rachael Yamagata	"Collide"	Used in the film In Her Shoes
2006	Plain White T's	"Hey There Delilah"	Double 2008 Grammy Award nominee
2007	Silversun Pickups	The Tripwire Sessions: Live in Chicago	All recorded at Gravity
