= Malicorne (band) =

French band

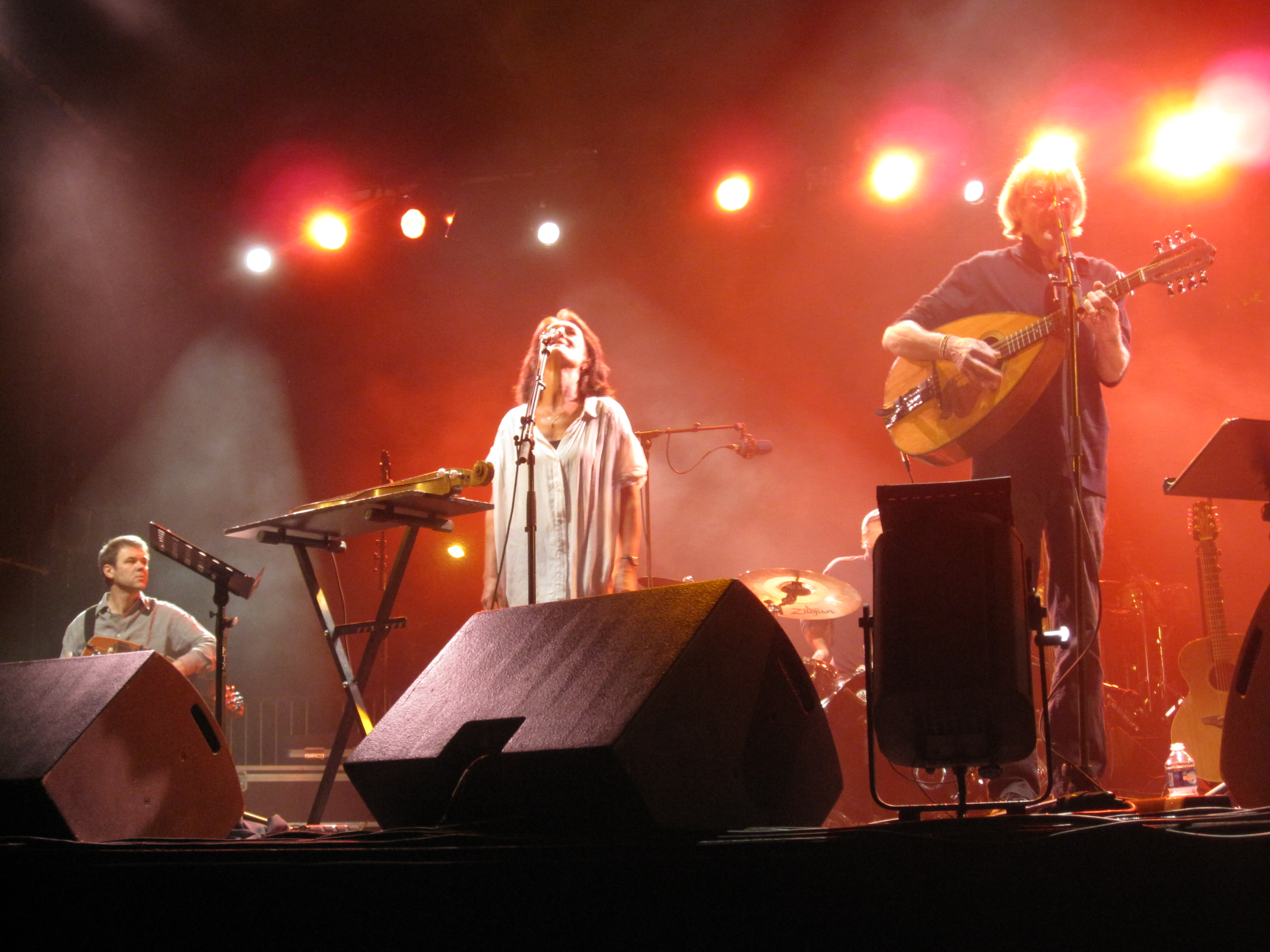
- Malicorne performing in September 2012 in Château-Thierry, France (Note: On 14 September 2012 in Château-Thierry, Picardie, France during the Patrimoine vivant Festival) (L-R: Gilles Chabenat, Marie Sauvet, David Pouradier Duteil, Gabriel Yacoub)

Background information
- Origin: Paris, France
- Genres: French folk; Canadian folk; folk rock; progressive rock
- Years active: 5 September 1973–22 July 1989; 15 July 2010 (unique show); November 2011–12 August 2017
- Labels: Hexagone; Ballon noir; Celluloïd; Elektra Records; Hannibal Records; Disc'AZ; Disques Vogue; Boucherie Productions; Le Roseau
- Past members: See Past members section below
- Website: Gabriel Yacoub Official website

Malicorne are a French folk and folk rock band formed in September 1973 by Gabriel Yacoub, Marie Yacoub (née Marie Sauvet), Hughes de Courson and Laurent Vercambre. They flourished in the 1970s, broke up three times in the 1980s (Note: In early 1982 at the end of their Balançoire En Feu tour, at the end of their Summer 1984 US & Fall 1984 France tours and on 22 July 1989 in Saint-Gouéno, Brittany, France at the end of their Les Cathédrales de L'Industrie tour.) but re-formed twice in the early 2010s (Note: On 15 July 2010 for a unique reunion show at Les Francofolies de La Rochelle Festival in La Rochelle, France, and starting from 27 November 2011) and toured from July 2012 until their last show in August 2017, after which they disbanded.

== History ==
=== 1973–1977: The traditional years ===
Gabriel Yacoub (1952–2025) and Marie Yacoub formed Malicorne on 5 September 1973 (naming it after the town of Malicorne in north-western France, famous for its porcelain and faience). For two years, Gabriel had been a member of Alan Stivell's band, playing folk-rock based on Breton music. He sang and played acoustic guitar, banjo and dulcimer with Stivell, appearing on his 1972 À l'Olympia breakthrough (live) album and his 1973 Chemins de Terre (studio) album, before leaving at the end of Summer 1973 to form his own band, intending to popularise French music the way Stivell had popularised Breton music. Since several of their albums are called simply Malicorne it had become the custom to refer to them by number, even though no number appears on the cover at all.

Released in October 1974, Malicorne 1 consisted of the four founder members, that is the Yacoubs, Hughes de Courson and Laurent Vercambre. They use a combination of electric guitar, violin, dulcimer, bouzouki and vocals. The four musicians, between them, could play twelve instruments. Their first four albums (one album released each Fall from 1974 to 1977) consisted of mostly traditional French folk songs, with, per album, one or two songs written by Gabriel Yacoub, one or two instrumentals and a few music and lyrics borrowed from some Canadian versions of the songs and instrumentals. They occasionally sang group harmonies a cappella. On Malicorne 4, they were lastingly joined by a fifth member, Olivier Zdrzalik, on bass, percussion and vocals.

=== 1978–1980: The experimental years ===
L'Extraordinaire Tour de France d'Adélard Rousseau, dit Nivernais la Clef des Cœurs, Compagnon Charpentier du Devoir (1978) was very much a concept album, concerning a guild craftsman's travels around France, with an implied spiritual exploration. It is perhaps the most exciting of their albums, with some gothic and prog-rock elements in the music. Like their next album Le Bestiaire, it consists mostly of songs by Gabriel, with a few by Zdrzalik and de Courson. The range of sounds of these albums is huge. Some sections are clearly classical music, but electronic wizardry and bagpipes also appear. Their appeal goes beyond the French-speaking world, and still gives them a dedicated following. All of their albums but one (Les Cathédrales de l'industrie) are available on CD. In 1978, Malicorne released their first compilation album Quintessence spanning their first four "classic" albums and including their non-album track "Martin" (previously released only as a single in early 1975).

=== 1981–1989: Decline, reunions and break-ups ===
The size of the band grew to seven members, including at one point, Brian Gulland from the English group Gryphon. Their commercial success enticed them into pure pop. Balançoire En Feu (1981) was a critical and commercial disappointment. They disbanded in early 1982 at the end of the album supporting tour. Malicorne reunited a first time in Summer 1984 to tour North America in July–August 1984 and to perform a few shows in France in October 1984; and a second time in February 1986 when Gabriel Yacoub's record company convinced him to record a new album under the name Malicorne, thus reactivating the band including new members. The new line-up recorded Les Cathédrales de L'Industrie (1986) which opens with the title track, a folk-rock song. One of the other tracks, "Big Science 1-2-3", is in the style of Peter Gabriel, Laurie Anderson or Gary Numan. About a year after the album release, the band embarked on a 2-year 1987–1989 extensive tour to support the new album, starting on 10 July 1987 at Les Francofolies de La Rochelle Festival, France and ending on 22 July 1989 in Saint-Gouéno, Brittany, France at the Festival des Tertres, France – a final show that would become the last Malicorne show for the twenty-one following years as Malicorne disbanded at the end of the tour.

=== 1989–2010: Break-up aftermath and solo careers ===
After the break-up, Malicorne released three other compilation albums: Légende (Deuxième Époque) [1978-1981] (1989), Vox (1996), a compilation mostly of Malicorne a cappella songs and Marie de Malicorne (2005), a compilation of Malicorne tracks featuring only those sung by Marie Yacoub. In 1990, Gabriel and Marie appeared as a duo in an event in London. All of Malicorne's songs were in French, apart from a few words of English on their final album. At the concert, they made some announcements in broken English. Gabriel continued to record as a solo artist. All his solo albums are available on CD but one, the best of compilation Tri.

=== 2010: Reunion show ===
Twenty-one years after their last show under the name Malicorne, the band reunited the classic line-up along with guest musicians and performed a one-off reunion concert on 10 July 2010 at Les Francofolies de La Rochelle Festival at the Grand Théâtre de la Coursive in La Rochelle. A CD and a DVD of the performance were released separately in March 2011.

=== 2011–2017: Rebirth ===
==== New band, tour, album and rename ====
In November 2011, 38 years after the release of their debut album Pierre de Grenoble, Gabriel Yacoub and Marie Yacoub (now Marie Sauvet) announced the formation of a new band under the name Gabriel et Marie de Malicorne, including four other members: Yannick Hardouin on keyboards, acoustic bass guitar and backing vocals, and Gilles Chabenat on electro-acoustic hurdy-gurdy (two Gabriel Yacoub's long-time music partners, performing with him as a trio since 2005), David Pouradier Duteil on drums, percussions and backing vocals (already part of the line-up at the July 2010 one-off reunion concert in La Rochelle, France) and newcomer Romain Personnat on diatonic accordion, harmonium and (mostly backing) vocals.

The new band also announced that they would embark in July 2012 on a concert tour entitled "Almanach Tour 2012-2013" and record a new album at the end of 2013.

Malicorne embarked on the Almanach Tour in July 2012 in Brittany, performing two shows there: on 8 July in Kergrist, Morbihan (Note: This warm-up show in the little village of Kergrist was initially planned to occur in the Parc municipal as an outdoor event but due to unsettled weather, it ultimately went indoor and occurred in the Salle polyvalente, a very small multipurpose hall with only a capacity of 100 seating places. Malicorne played sold-out to such an extent that the attendance exceeded the concert hall capacity as most of the audience attended the show standing.) and on 24 July in Quimper, Finistère (Note: As part of the Festival de Cornouaille 2012.).

During the Almanach Tour, the band performed in France at many venues, especially during summer festivals. During the first 6 months, out of 8 dates, the band performed 5 dates in Brittany where Malicorne always enjoyed a great popularity. The tour continued beyond 2013, visiting the whole country and three foreign countries, Belgium in 2013, the Netherlands in 2014 and Switzerland in 2015.

On 20 September 2012 the six-member band had decided to become simply Malicorne, after the eponymous duo had realized that the new name "didn't work", that "in people's mind, this remained Malicorne".

==== Line-up changes ====
At a Malicorne concert on 24 May 2013 in Aubervilliers, a seventh member was on stage, appearing to be one of Gabriel Yacoub's long-time music partners: guitarist Nicolaïvan Mingot. Malicorne performed again as a 6-musician band at the following concert on 6 July 2013 at the Gooikoorts Festival in Belgium. At the next Malicorne show on 14 July 2013, Mingot was back on stage with the Malicorne. Since then, Mingot had permanently joined the band.

On 14 July 2013, during the Château d'Ars Festival, Malicorne's founder member Laurent Vercambre joined the band on stage as a guest musician to perform a few tracks, first as a solo violinist and secondly within the nyckelharpas duo he had formed at the time with Eleonore Billy. This was the first time Laurent played again with the band since the one-off reunion show Malicorne performed (exactly) three years earlier on 15 July 2010 in La Rochelle. Thereafter, Laurent supported Malicorne at their concert on 20 September 2014 at Le Trianon in Paris, France, their first major show in the capital city since their previous one twenty-six years ago (on 5 March 1988 at the Théâtre Déjazet).

In December 2014, Laurent Vercambre permanently returned to the band, replacing Romain Personnat. The new line-up gave its first show in January 2015 at the Théâtre des Feuillants in Dijon, Burgundy, France.

==== New material ====
On 24 June 2015, Malicorne confirmed that their new studio album was still in preparation, confiding "taking the time necessary to obtain an album of quality" and announcing "hoping anyway to release [...] some time in October 2015" two discs : a 4-track EP « to set the tone of the album » and a vinyl record (including two versions) of a new track, "Les Cendres de Jeanne", a song written by Gabriel Yacoub about Joan of Arc. Finally, only the vinyl was released on 10 December 2015 under the name Jehanne, including two different versions: the A-side version entitled "Les Cendres de Jeanne" (written by Gabriel Yacoub / Nicolaïvan Mingot) performed by Malicorne & the B-side version entitled "Ghjuvanna" (written by Gabriel Yacoub / Nicolaïvan Mingot / Laurent Vercambre) performed by A Filetta, a Corsican band and Malicorne's long-time friends.

==== Vercambre's departure ====
In mid September 2015 Laurent Vercambre left the band, after a spell of nine months, with plans for new musical projects. He was to announce his departure on stage, during what was to be his last show with the band, on 25 September 2015, in Coucy-le-Château, Picardy, as part of the (inaugural) Historica/Pagan Festival. The show was cancelled however, after the entire event was cancelled by its organisers. Malicorne once again became a sextet.

On 18 December 2015, Malicorne performed its first show since Vercambre's departure, in Corbeil-Essonnes, Paris. This was only the band's 5th show in Île-de-France (out of 32 shows) following the dates at Aubervilliers on 24 May 2013, Cachan on 14 March 2014, Paris (at Le Trianon) on 20 September 2014 and La Verrière (near Versailles) on 10 April 2015.

Malicorne performed only five shows in 2016, all of them occurring in the provinces. (Note: On 9 January 2016 in Lignières, on 13 February 2016 in Foix, on 11 March 2016 in Jarnac, on 8 July 2016 in Vivonne (near Poitiers) and on 21 October 2016 in Ploërmel, Morbihan.) Their last 2016 show on, 21 October 2016 in Ploërmel, Morbihan, was their 37th since the beginning of the Almanach Tour in early July 2012 but also their first show in Brittany since the one (almost three years previously) on 7 December 2013 in Tréguier, Côtes-d'Armor.

==== Final show ====
Malicorne performed their very last show on 12 August 2017 at the Festival du chant de marin in Paimpol, Brittany. Concomitantly, the new album project was cancelled as the band had de facto (definitively) ceased to exist.

== Touring ==
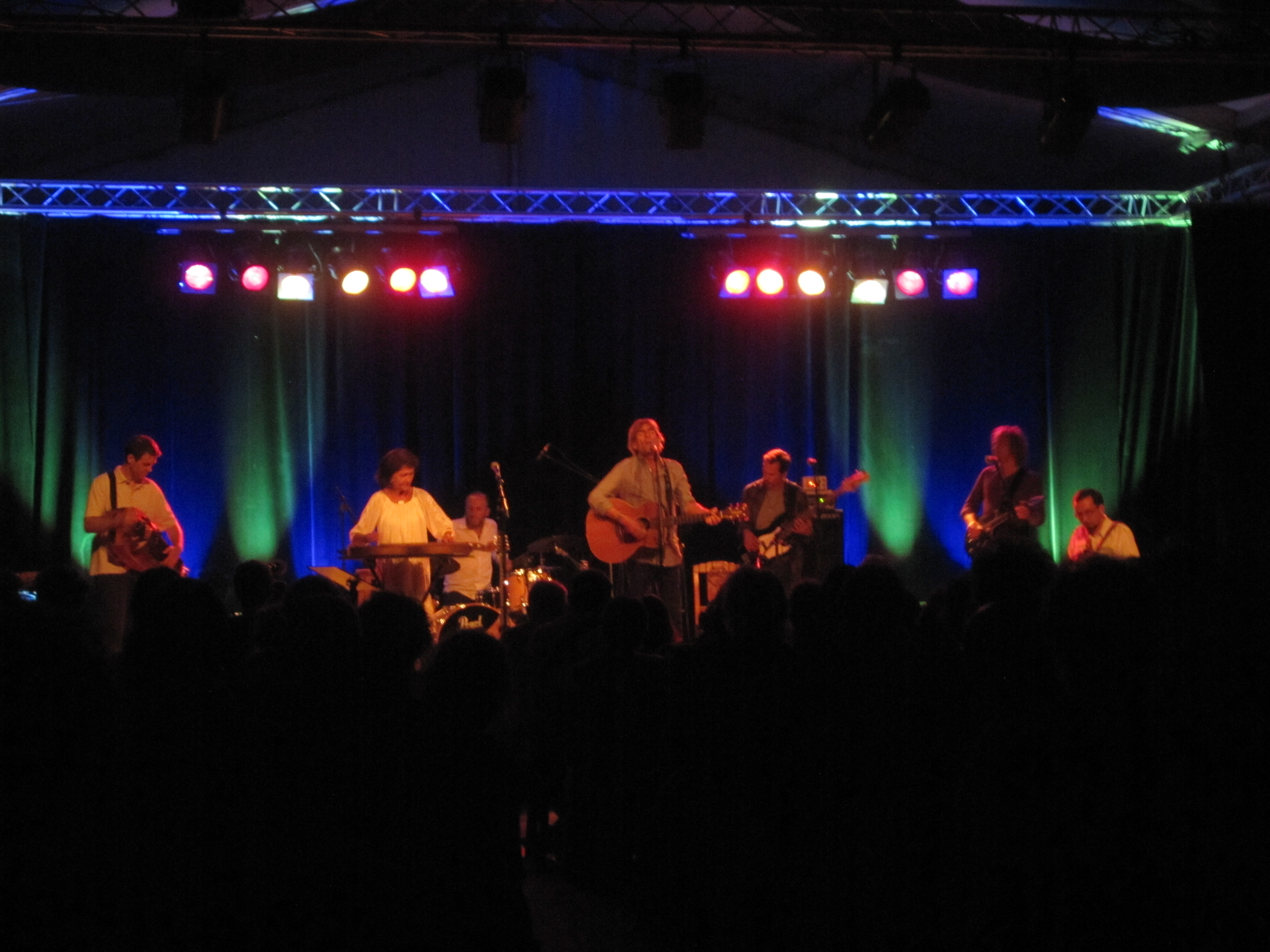
Malicorne performing in August 2013 in Anost, Burgundy, France (Note: On 16 August 2013 in Anost, Burgundy, France during the Fête de la vielle en Morvan.) (L-R: Gilles Chabenat, Marie Sauvet, David Pouradier Duteil, Gabriel Yacoub, Yannick Hardouin, Nicolaïvan Mingot and Romain Personnat)

Once they had gained a reputation in France, Malicorne toured in French-speaking Canada. The album En Public (1979) was recorded live in Montreal in December 1978. They toured over 800 venues in Europe, Canada and the United States.

== Members ==
=== Past members ===
==== Full members ====
- Gabriel Yacoub (1952–2025) – 1973–1989, 1995 (unique performance (Note: In June 1995, at the Passage du Nord-Ouest in Paris, France, the three other Malicorne former members joined together with Gabriel Yacoub at the end of one of his solo shows to perform a cappella one of their most famous song, "Marions les roses".)), 2010 (unique show), 2011–2017 – lead vocals, electric & acoustic guitars, épinette des Vosges, mandolin, mandoloncello, banjo
- Marie Sauvet – 1973–1987, 1995 (unique performance), 2010 (unique show), 2011–2017 – lead vocals, dulcimer, bouzouki, hurdy-gurdy
- Hughes de Courson – 1973–1976, 1977–1978, 1981 (producer and guest recording musician only), 1995 (unique performance), 2010 (unique show) – bass guitar, percussions, cromorne, vocals
- Laurent Vercambre – 1973–1976, 1977–1978, 1995 (unique performance), 2010 (unique show), 2013 (as a guest musician at the Château d'Ars Festival), 2014–2015 – violin, viola, bouzouki, psaltery, harmonium, mandolin, vocals
- Max Picout (d. 17 November 2011) – 1973–1974 (touring only) – bass guitar
- Pierre Kerhervé – 1975–1976 (touring only) – bass guitar
- Olivier Zdrzalik-Kowalski – 1976–1986, 2010 – bass guitar
- Claude Alvarez-Pereyre – 1976–1977 (touring only) – violin, electric guitar
- René Werneer – 1976–1977 (touring only) – violin
- Brian Gulland – 1979 (only guest recording musician on En public), 1979–1980 – bassoon, cromorne, flute, harpsichord, keyboards, saxophone, oboe, vocals
- Patrick Le Mercier – 1979–1982 – violin, electric guitar, Scottish bagpipes, gaita, lyra, cromorne, vocals
- Jean-Pierre Arnoux (≈1946– d. 4 July 2002) – 1979–1982, 1986–1989 (recording and touring) – drums, percussions
- Dominique Regef – 1979–1980 – cello, rebec, hurdy-gurdy, sanza
- Félix Blanchard – 1982 (touring only) – keyboards
- Michel Le Cam – 1984 (touring only), 1986–1989 (recording and touring) – violin, mandolin, accordion, vocals
- Gérard Lavigne – 1984 (touring only) – bass guitar
- Jean-Marc Alexandre – 1984 (touring only) – electric guitar
- Frank Gliksman – 1984 (touring only) – drums
- Patrice Clémentin – 1986 (guest recording musician only), 1987–1989 (touring only) – synthesizers, sequencers, vocals
- Frédéric Mathet – 1987–1988 (touring only) – bass guitar, clarinet, vocals
- Nikki Matheson – 1987–1989 (touring only) – keyboards, tin whistles, vocals
- Yannick Hardouin – 1989 (touring only), 2010 (unique show), 2011–2017 – bass guitar
- Gilles Chabenat – 2010 (unique show), 2011–2017 – hurdy-gurdy
- David Pouradier Duteil – 2010 (unique show), 2011–2017 – drums, percussions
- Romain Personnat – 2011–2014 (touring and recording) – diatonic accordion, harmonium, vocals
- Nicolaïvan Mingot – 2013–2017 – electric guitar

==== Guest studio musicians ====
- Dan Ar Braz – 1978 – electric guitar
- Michel Santangeli – 1978 – drums
- Bruno Menny – 1978 – orgue à voix ("voice organ") (also a recording studio assistant)
- Alain Roux – 1979 – harmonica
- Iván Lantos – 1981 – Bulgarian bagpipes, kaval flute
- Véronique Harvey – 1981 – backing vocals
- Jim Cuomo – 1981 – saxophones
- Bertrand Darin – 1981 – piano
- Michel Bourzeix– 1981 – xylophone
- Richard Galliano – 1981 – accordion, bandoneon
- Alan Kloatr – 1986 – uilleann pipes, tin whistle
- Olivier Daviau – 1986 – chabrette
- Jean-Michel Kajdan – 1986 – electric guitar

==== Guest live musicians ====
- André Proulx – violin (only twice at the two shows on 2 & 3 December 1978 at El Casino, Montreal, Quebec, Canada)
- Les Charbonniers de l'enfer – vocals (only once on 20 August 2012 at the Festival des Traversées Tatihou, Tatihou island, near Saint-Vaast-la-Hougue, Normandy, France (Note: The Canadian a cappella folk music band Les Charbonniers de l'enfer joined Malicorne on stage to perform together one of Malicorne's classic songs "Les Tristes Noces" from their milestone album Almanach (1976).))
- Eléonore Billy – nyckelharpa (only once on 14 July 2013 at the Château d'Ars Festival in Lourouer-Saint-Laurent, Indre, France)
- Raphaël Thiery – cornemuse du Centre (bagpipes of Central France) (only once on 16 August 2013 at the Fête de la vielle en Morvan in Anost, Burgundy, France)

== Discography ==
=== Pre-Malicorne albums ===
- Pierre de Grenoble (as Gabriel & Marie Yacoub) (1973)

=== Malicorne albums ===
==== Studio albums ====
- Malicorne (aka Malicorne 1 or Colin) (1974)
- Malicorne (aka Malicorne 2 or Le Mariage anglais) (1975)
- Almanach (1976)
- Malicorne (aka Malicorne 4 or Nous sommes chanteurs de sornettes) (1977)
- L'Extraordinaire tour de France d'Adélard Rousseau (1978)
- Le Bestiaire (1979)
- Balançoire En Feu (1981)
- Les Cathédrales de L'Industrie (1986)

==== Live albums ====
- En Public (1979) (live #1: partial live recording of 2 shows on 2 & 3 December 1978 at El Casino, Montreal, Quebec, Canada)
- Concert exceptionnel aux Francofolies de la Rochelle (2011) (live #2: live recording of the show on 15 July 2010 at Les Francofolies de La Rochelle Festival, La Rochelle, France; 1CD & 1DVD)

==== Compilation albums ====
- Quintessence (1978) (Best Of 1974–1977)
- Légende (Deuxième Époque) [1978-1981] (1989) (Best Of 1978–1981)
- Vox (1996) (Collection of songs performed only a cappella)
- Marie de Malicorne (2005) (Collection of songs performed only by Marie Sauvet)

=== Singles ===
The Malicorne singles were mostly not-for-sale promotional ones (except for three of them released in 1986, 1996 and 2015):

1. 1975: Martin (A: "Martin" (1975) (3:05) / B: "Ronde (Instrumental)" (1974) (1:49)) (Hexagone 881 002) (Note: Martin was the very first Malicorne single, released in early 1975, following the release in October 1974 of their debut album Malicorne 1, their record company considering that their first album lacked a commercial track.)
2. 1975: J'ai vu le Loup, le Renard et la Belette (A: "J'ai vu le Loup, le Renard et la Belette" (1975) (2:27) / B: "Marions les Roses" (3:28) (1975)) (Hexagone 881 004)
3. 1975: Marions les Roses (A: "Marions les Roses (version courte spécial radio)" (1975) (2.57) / B: "J'ai vu le Loup, le Renard et la Belette" (1975) (2.27)) (Hexagone 882 001)
4. 1976: La Jambe Me Fait Mal (Noël est arrivé) (spécial radio) (A: "La Jambe Me Fait Mal (Noël est arrivé)" (1976) (2.00) / B: "Quand Je Menai Mes Chevaux Boire" (1976) (3.45)) (Hexagone 882 006)
5. 1976: Almanach (spécial radio) (A: "La Fille au Cresson" (1976) (3:35) / B: "Branle de la haie" (1976) (2:05)) (Hexagone 882 007)
6. 1978: La Chica De Berro (La Fille Au Cresson) (A: "La Fille Au Cresson" ("La Chica De Berro") (1976) (3:37) / B: "Quand Je Menais Mes Chevaux Boire" ("Cuando Llevaba Mis Caballos A Beber") (1976) (4:36) (Mediterraneo (Spain) 01.0383/6)
7. 1978: À Paris la grande Ville (A: "À Paris la grande Ville" (1978) / B: "La danse des damnés" (1978) (Ballon Noir Bal 45001)
8. 1986: Dormeur (A: "Dormeur (version radio 3'50)" (1986) (3:50) / B: "Dormeur (version album 4'42)" (1986) (4:42)) (Celluloïd CEL 1942) (non-promotional single)
9. 1986: Big Science (1.2.3.) (A: "Big Science (1.2.3.)" (1986) / B: "Sorcier" (1986)) (Celluloïd CEL 1945)
10. 1996: Marions les Roses (A: "Marions les Roses (remix 1996)" (3:16) / B: "Marions les Roses" (1975) (3:30)) (Acousteack – Boucherie Productions – BP9291-A) (non-promotional single)
11. 2015: Jehanne (A: "Les Cendres de Jeanne" (2015) / B: "Ghjuvanna" (2015)) (self-production – only available in one format: 33 1/3 rpm / 30 cm / 2 tracks vinyl record) (non-promotional single)

== Bibliography ==
- Arnaud Choutet, Malicorne, Le Mot et le Reste Edition, Marseille, June 2016, pp. 176
