= Gara Darvish =

Azerbaijani rock musician (born 1990)

Gara Darvish Azerbaijani: Qara Dərviş
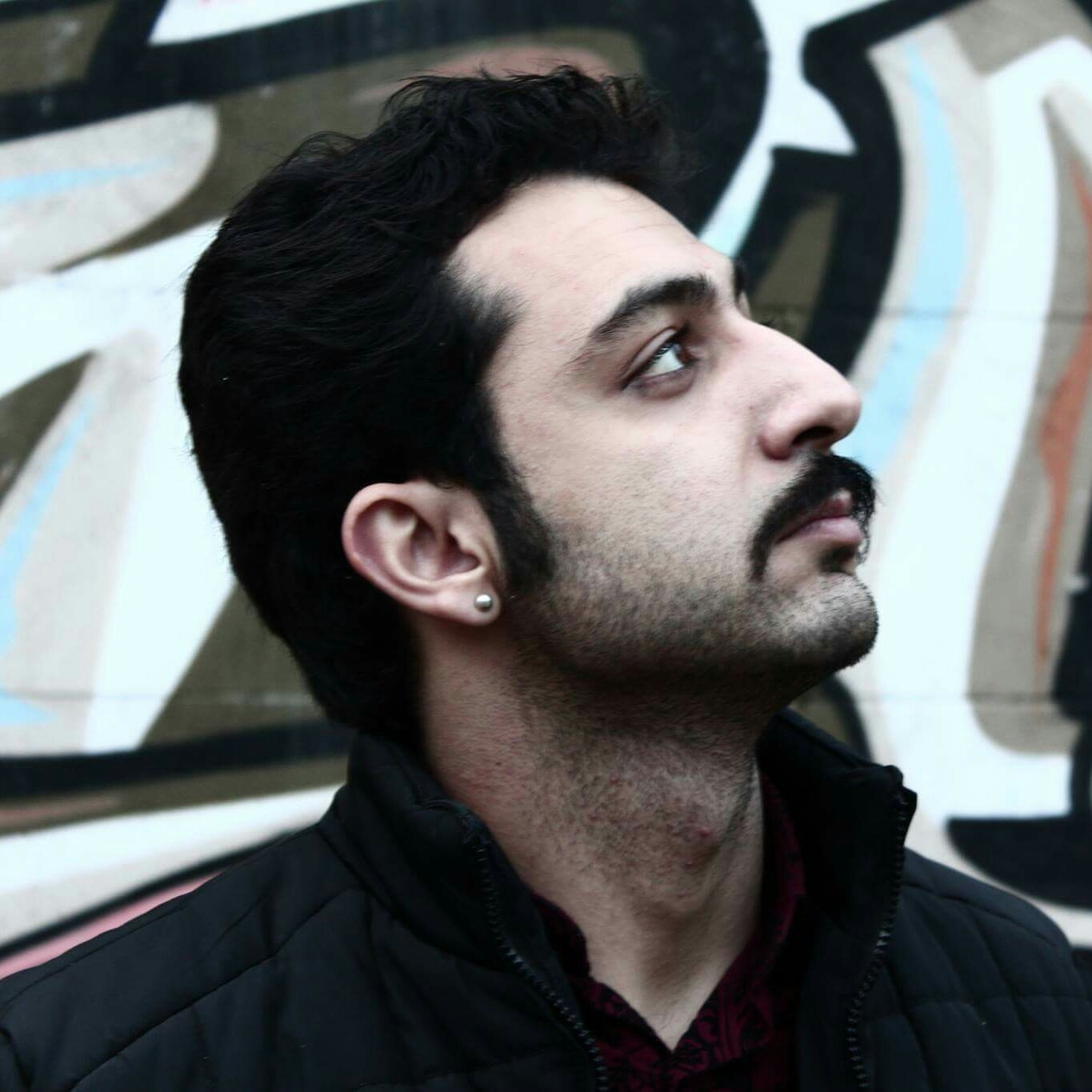

Background information
- Birth name: Azerbaijani: Hikmət Poladzadə
- Born: October 11, 1990 (age 34); Baku, Azerbaijan
- Genres: Heavy metal music, Thrash metal, Jazz, Classical music, Progressive metal, Funk
- Occupation(s): Musician, Songwriter, Composer
- Instrument: Guitar
- Years active: 2008–present
- Labels: Sekiz Müzik Yapım, Darvisch Creative Sounds
- Website: qaradervis.com

Hikmat Poladzade (better known by the stage name Gara Darvish, Azerbaijani: Qara Dərviş, born October 11, 1990) is an Azerbaijani rock musician.

== Biography ==
Gara Darvish (Black Darvish) was born on October 11, 1990, in a family of teachers, since early his childhood he had an immense interest in music, after graduating from the Persian gymnasium named after Sayyed Jafar Pishevari. In parallel with his studies at the Azerbaijan University of Architecture and Construction, he studied vocals and composition at the Baku Academy of Music.

== Musical career ==
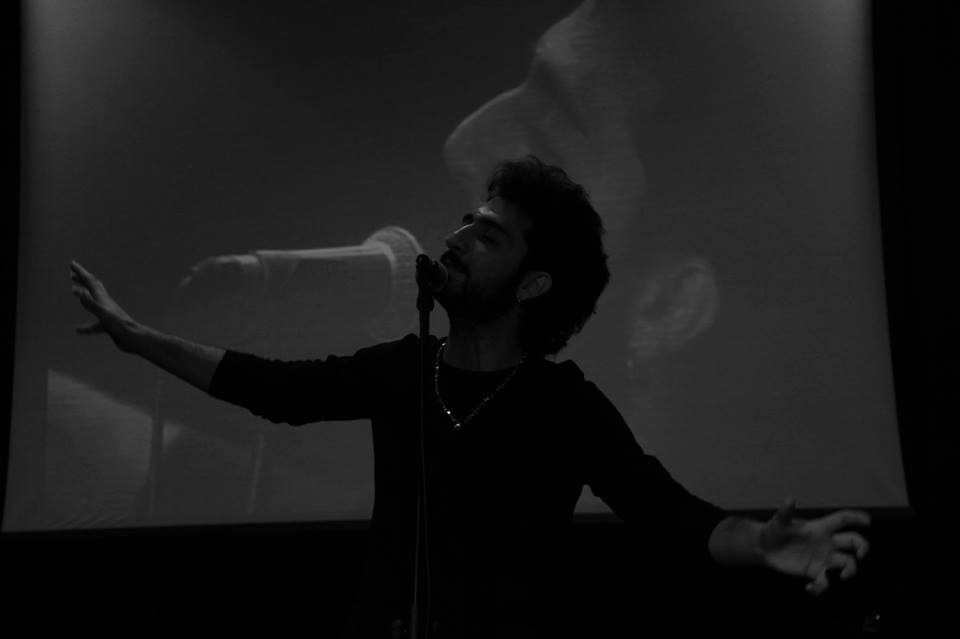
"TEDx Baku" 2013. Baku, Azerbaijan.

Gara Darvish's first demo album was released in 2008. Moreover, in the album poems of the outstanding Azerbaijani poet and philosopher of the XIV-XV centuries – Imadaddin Nasimi were presented, which in turn had become the first example of using the medieval Arabic versification of gazelles in metal genre in Azerbaijan and the world. Gara Darvish's solo concert in Sumqayit in 2010 re-launched the development of rock movement in the country, which fell into decay after the collapse of the Azerbaijani hard rock band Yukhu in 2001. In 2010, Gara performed on the same stage with the American famous indie-rock band Brazzaville, presenting Azerbaijani rock music. After completing his studies, Gara Dervish spent a year in military service.

After a mandatory break, he returned to music, rearranged and performed the song of Azerbaijani composer Emin Sabitoglu and writer Anar – "İncəbellim". After gaining wide popularity among the local audience, in 2013 Gara performed in TED-Baku project. In the same year, Gara Darvish performed in Green Theater in Baku together with the American band Filligar, which was appointed by the US government as cultural diplomats and conducted a large international tour. Thus, Gara Darvish's music presented the culture of Azerbaijan at the international level.

After obtaining a degree in the field of sound engineering and production at SAE Institute Istanbul (2013), and a master's degree at Bahçheshir University (2014), he released his first album, "National Pearls" (2015), which was created with the participation of the internationally recognized singer, mugam performer Alim Gasimov, and the Azerbaijani player on musical instrument Balaban – Alihan Samedov. The album had been recording for 3 years in Baku, Tiflis and Istanbul by the studios Darvish Creative Sounds, SAE Istanbul, BAU, Dodo, and was released by the company Sekiz Müzik Yapım. After this, Gara came back to Azerbaijan, shot in Baku the music videos for songs "Keçmiş" (the Past), "Yorğun" (Weary), Yağmur (The Rain). Currently, Gara lives in Istanbul and continues to cooperate with many famous artists of Azerbaijan and Turkey.

== Discography ==
On his works Gara Darvish, he seeks to concentrate on the lyrics and his own philosophy, mixing various directions of rock, folk and classical music.

=== Singles ===
- Sığmazam – 2008
- Saxtakar – 2008
- Sabahım, yoxsa son gecəm – 2009
- İnsan – 2009
- Sərxoş – 2010
- İstəmə – 2012
- Yalan həqiqətlər – 2012
- İncəbellim – 2013
- Bağışla – 2014
- Cəsəd Sevdası – 2014
- Yenilməz Batalyon (Teymurun Mahnısı) – 2015
- Sən Ey Uşaqlıq – 2015
- Zibeydə – 2015
- Çıx Yaşıl Düzə – 2015
- Sarı Gəlin – 2015
- Синяя Вечность – 2015
- Qocalmısan – 2016
- Sürgün – 2016
- Keçmiş – 2016
- Yorğun – 2017
- Yağmur – 2017
- Qafil Oyan – 2017
- Üsyan – 2017
- Yalandı Dünya – 2017
- Yaşa mənim xalqım / Azərbaycan – 2018
- Sən günəşsən – 2018
- Əlvida – 2019
