= Hexagon Theatre =

Hexagon Theatre may refer to:

- Hexagon Theatre (KwaZulu-Natal), theatre in South Africa
- The Hexagon, theatre in Reading, England
