= Langeleik =

Norwegian drone zither

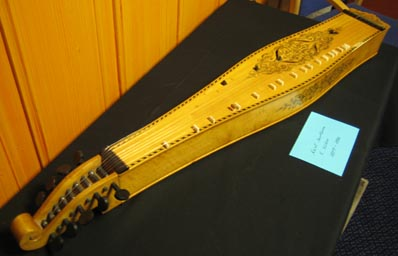

String instrument
- Hornbostel–Sachs classification: 314.122-6 (chordophone / box zither sounded by a plectrum)
- Developed: Possibly 16th century

Related instruments
- Scheitholt (Germany); Epinette des Vosges (France); Langspil (Iceland); Hummel (Sweden); Appalachian dulcimer

Musicians
- List of Langeleik players

The langeleik, also called langleik, is a Norwegian stringed folklore musical instrument, a droned zither.

== Description ==
The langeleik has only one melody string and up to 8 drone strings. Under the melody string there are seven frets per octave, forming a diatonic major scale. The drone strings are tuned to a triad. The langeleik is tuned to about an A, though on score the C major key is used, as if the instrument were tuned in C. This is for simplification of both writing and reading, by circumventing the use of accidentals.

Since the instrument can not play a chromatic scale, nor be easily tuned to other pitches, it is very limited in its ability to play along with other instruments and/or more harmonically complex music.

The combination of the lone melody string and the multiple drone strings gives the langeleik a distinctively rich sound.

== History ==
There exists a variety of box zithers in Europe. The German scheitholt and the Swedish Hummel have been suggested as the predecessor of the langeleik. However, in 1980 a langeleik dated as early as 1524 was uncovered on a farm in Vibergsroa, Gjøvik, Norway. This instrument predates any documented occurrences of the scheitholt, the hummel or any other similar instrument.

The older Langeleik types were tuned after Pythagorean fashion, based on pure fifths and octaves, with variable smaller intervals. Thus, the pitches could easily be moved between more sombre "low" intervals and the more bright major ones. The fixed Langeleik with a recognizable major scale is dated to after 1850. After this change in tonation, many players had to change their melodies, or find new ones, as the older repertoire no longer fitted into the new system.

== Types of langeleik ==
Early langeleiks are basically rectangular in shape, and often have an open bottom. They usually have five or six strings. They often had unique traditional scales other than the modern major scale (using 3/4 tones, etc.). Especially the third and seventh tend to be different; the third is often neutral (between a major and minor third) and the seventh tends to be lower than the modern leading tone.

Modern langeleiks are somewhat curved, being wider at the middle, as it is the experience of modern instrument makers that this makes the instrument sound louder. They are all tuned to a major scale.

== Playing ==
The right hand holds a long plectrum, and with this plectrum it strikes the beat, the basic rhythm.

The left hand utilizes only its index, middle and ring finger.

When a desired melody note is to be executed on the basic beat, the left hand only need to hold down the melody string, and the right hand will strike it with the plectrum.

When a note is wanted in between the basic rhythm, the index or middle finger needs to hammer-on or pull-off the melody string.

== Tradition ==
Norway has several areas of culture, amplified due to its many mountains, valleys and fjords; some areas have their own versions of springdans. (See Polska)

Valdres and Vardal are the only areas where the langeleik has a living (and thus more developed) tradition, with more melodies available, especially of the more recent, more complex kind, made for arguably better instruments. The picture above is of a Valdres langeleik. It is also home of the valdres springar dance.

Telemark is another distinct area of Norway, home of the Telemark springar. The Telemark langeleik is distinct from the Valdres kind in that the sound-box is thin and straight-walled whereas the Valdres-langeleik curves to a broader lower part, and it does not have a board at the bottom and thus is more dependent on a good table for amplification. Also the head looks all different.

The langeleik has had a renaissance, and while there are players in most part of Norway, there are not so many places -at least not well known- where the instrument is being played officially. This is perhaps mostly due to that it is a solo instrument.

Gjøvik Spelemannslag (Note: Gjøvik Spelemannslag both build and play together on various kind of folklore and old/medieval instruments) (the folk musician guild of Gjøvik ) has a steady group of langeleik-players which meets every Wednesday. They also build langeleiks and a lot of other kinds of instruments.

== Music ==
The types of tunes mostly played on the instrument are reinlender, vals, mazurka, gangar, springar and halling.

See Gammeldans (old dance) and Bygdedans (village dance) for more information.

== See also ==
- Appalachian dulcimer
- Epinette des Vosges
- Hummel (instrument)
- Langspil
- Scheitholt
