= Malicorne 4 =

Studio album by Malicorne
- Released: 1976
- Recorded: 1976
- Genre: Folk, Celtic
- Length: 40:51
- Label: Hexagone

Malicorne (aka Malicorne 4 or Nous sommes chanteurs de sornettes) is an album by Malicorne. It is sometimes referred to as Nous sommes chanteurs de sornettes because the album is simply called "Malicorne" and "Nous sommes chanteurs de sornettes" is the first track.

== Overview ==
For the first time in Malicorne's music, electronic effects and synthesisers are heard on a few tracks. The final track in particular is a slightly crazy assemblage of medieval and modern instruments. "Daniel mon fils" is either a translation of the English folk song "Lord Randal", or the French equivalent of it. It was recorded and released in 1976. Running time 40 minutes 51 sec.

== Track listing ==
1. Nous sommes chanteurs de sornettes/gavotte (Gabriel Yacoub/Trad)
2. Couché tard, levé matin (Words:Trad/Music Gabriel Yacoub)
3. Daniel, mon fils (Gabriel Yacoub)
4. Le déserteur/Le congé (Trad/Olivier Zdrzalik and Gabriel Yacoub)
5. La blanche biche (Trad)
6. Bacchu-ber (Trad)
7. Le jardinier de couvent (Trad)
8. Misère (Trad)
9. La fiancée du timbalier (Words: Victor Hugo/music: Trad)
10. Ma chanson est dite (Trad)

== Personnel ==
- Gabriel Yacoub (vocals, acoustic and electric guitar, mandolin-cello, banjo)
- Marie Yacoub (vocals, hurdy-gurdy, epinette des Vosges)
- Laurent Vercambre (vocals, violin, cello, viola, acoustic guitar, mandolin, mandolin-cello, keyboards, vocals)
- Hughes de Courson (vocals, flute a bec, positive organ, piano, elka, synthesiser, crumhorn, percussion, glockenspiel)
- Olivier Zdrzalik (vocals, electric bass, elka, percussion).
