= Langspil =

String instrument

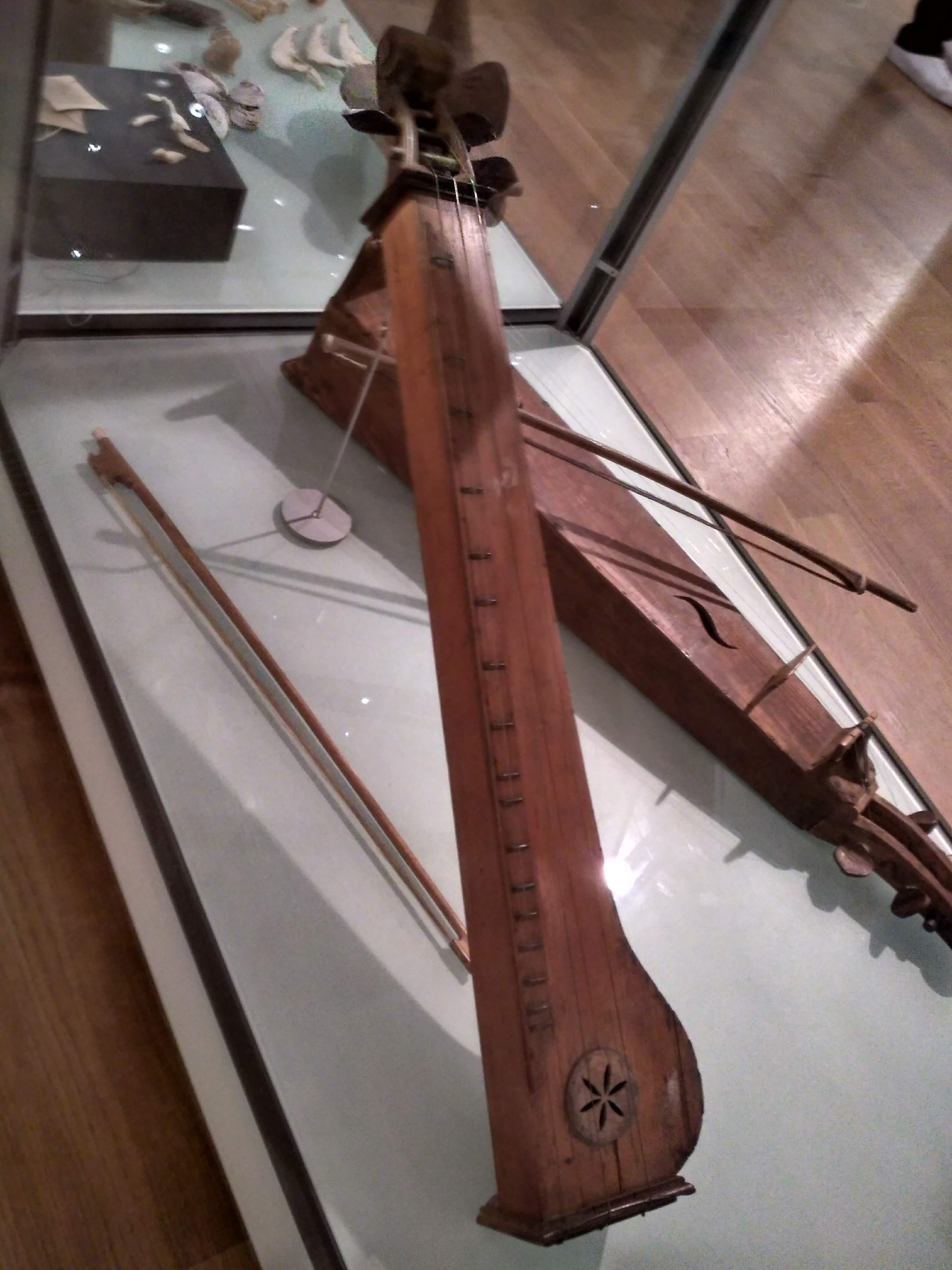
- Langspil in the National Museum of Iceland, in Reykjavik, Iceland.

String instrument
- Classification: String instruments
- Hornbostel–Sachs classification: 314.1 (true board zither)

Related instruments
- Langeleik, Scheitholt, Epinette des Vosges, Dulcimer

The langspil (Icelandic pronunciation: [ˈlauŋkˌspɪːl̥]; meaning long-play) is a traditional Icelandic drone zither. It has a single melody string and usually 2 drone strings.

The langspil can be played by plucking the strings by hand, with a bow or by hammering. Langspils exist in two basic versions, straight and curved and are generally around the length of 80 cm (31 in), and can be as long as 104 cm (41 in) or as short as 73 cm (29 in). Many different types of wood have traditionally been used, including pine, fir, beechwood, birch, oak and walnut, since they were generally constructed from driftwood.

== History ==
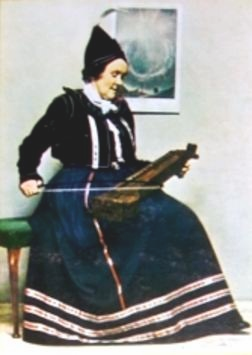
Anna Þórhallsdóttir, wearing a traditional costume playing her langspil with a bow

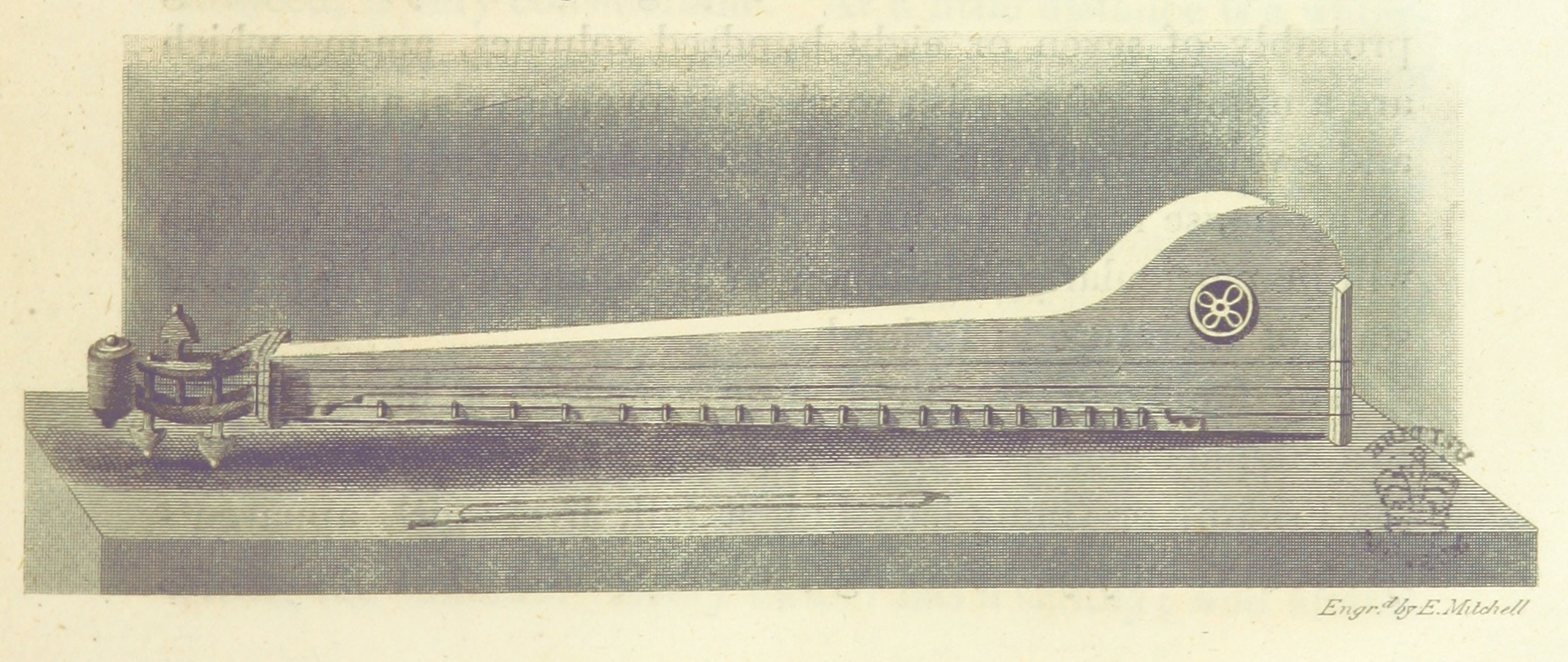
Langspil illustration from 1811

The oldest written sources describing the langspil are from the 18th century. In those times langspil instruments are described as a long thin box, wider at the bottom end and with one to six strings. In the early 19th century a version with a curved soundbox emerged which has improved sound qualities. In 1855 the book Leiðarvísir til að spila á langspil (A guide on playing the langspil) was published. It also included information on how to make langspils, although with a slight printing error in the fretting. This book increased the popularity of the langspil quite a lot. However, by the middle of the 20th century the instrument had become rare and few played it any more.

By the 1960s, the singer Anna Þórhallsdóttir realized that the langspil was slowly disappearing from Icelandic musical traditions and as a response she spearheaded its revival, which is still ongoing. Today a number of bands and performers include the langspil in their repertoire, including Spilmenn Ríkinís, Sigurður Rúnar Jónsson, Bára Grímsdóttir, Chris Foster and Þórður Tómasson á Skógum. The langspil also has an important place in the yearly folk-song festival in Siglufjörður. In recent years, the singer and music teacher Eyjólfur Eyjólfsson has led a project that aims to teach school children to build and play their own langspil instruments.

== See also ==
- Appalachian dulcimer
- Epinette des Vosges
- Hummel (instrument)
- Langeleik
- Scheitholt
- Fiðla, the other string instrument native to Iceland
