= Jean-François Dutertre =

French musician

Jean-François Dutertre (31 March 1948 - 10 March 2017) was a French singer-songwriter and player of the hurdy-gurdy, épinette des Vosges, and traditional French music. He also played the bodhran and the bouzouki.

He had been a member of the band Mélusine and a house collaborator on the disk Le Chant du Monde. He was a great proponent of modal music and conducted numerous workshops. He was an advocate of the professionalisation of traditional musicians and singers and defended their rights in the CIMT (Centre d’information des musiques traditionnelles et du monde).

== Life and career ==
Born in 1948 to Norman parents, he studied literature and also taught. He worked as a phonothécaire at the department of ethnomusicology at the musée de l'homme, and became enamored of traditional music, particularly French. He became involved in the Folk Revival of the 1960s, and joined the first French folk-club, Le Bourdon ("the drone"), and traveled to collect music in Quebec and Ireland in 1969 and 1970, as well as in Vosges from 1970-1972.

From 1975 to 1983, he was the executive producer and director of the collection of the label Chant du Monde, where he also worked to develop the Anthologie de la musique traditionnelle française. He played in the folk group Melusine from 1975-1990.

In 2002, he produced a disc of fifteen songs, coming from those collected in Normandy along with his old colleagues Jean-loup Baly and Yvon Guilcher, as well as other musicians such as Jean Blanchard.

Lately, he had devoted himself primarily to his work in musical institutions.

== Discography ==
- 1974 L'épinette des Vosges, airs traditionnels et compositions, Le chant du Monde LDX 74536.
- 1978 La rondes des milloraines, compositions pour épinette de Vosges et vielle, Le Chant du Monde LDX 74664.
- 1980 Si l'amour prenait racine, chansons traditionnelles, Polydor 2393275.
- 1997 Ballades françaises, Buda Musique, MP7250.
- 1999 Ballades françaises, volume 2, Buda Musique, MP7253.
- 2002 Chansons traditionnelles de Normandie, Buda Musique/Universal.
- 2008 "Le fil des jours" Buda Musique/Universal.

=== Participating discography ===
- See the discography of Mélusine (music)
- Musique populaire d'expression française, du folk-club Le Bourdon, expression spontanée n° 7, auto-production, 1972. J-F Dutertre y chante et joue de la cuiller.
- 1975 Le roi renaud / Ballades françaises, le Chant du Monde LDX 74568.
- Le galant noyé le Chant du Monde LDX 74576.
- Chants à répondre et à danser Le Chant du Monde LDX 74515.
- Pré-Folk / La préhistoire du Folk Pathé-marconi-EMI.
- 1994 ANTHOLOGIE DE LA CHANSON FRANCAISE / DES TROUVERES A LA PLEIADE EPM.
- 1997 L'épinette des Vosges, avec Jean Ribouillault et Christophe Toussaint, Radio-France Ocora.
- 2002 Le Jardin des mystères Eric Montbel - Ulysse/Nocturne.
- 2008 Par un lundi m'y prit envie..., La Loure

== Bibliography ==
- L'Épinette des Vosges, Méthode complète Avec Jean-Loup Baly, auto-édition 1982, 82 pages.
- Ballades et complaintes recueil de chants populaires, FAMDT éditions.

== Quotes ==
« La chanson traditionnelle francophone est aussi une forme de poésie. Et comme toute poésie, elle porte l’empreinte du milieu et de la période où elle a été élaborée. Cette empreinte se manifeste dans les formules, les tournures et le vocabulaire. Aurait-on l’idée de reprocher à François Villon d’écrire dans la langue d’un étudiant parisien du XVe siècle ? Au-delà de la forme, la thématique est éternelle, les émois et les tourments demeurent identiques. Et puis, il y a la musique. Connaît-on, dans la chanson française, de plus parfaite adéquation entre langue et mélodie que celle que nous propose la chanson traditionnelle ? » (Jean-François Dutertre)
