= Scheitholt =

Traditional German stringed instrument

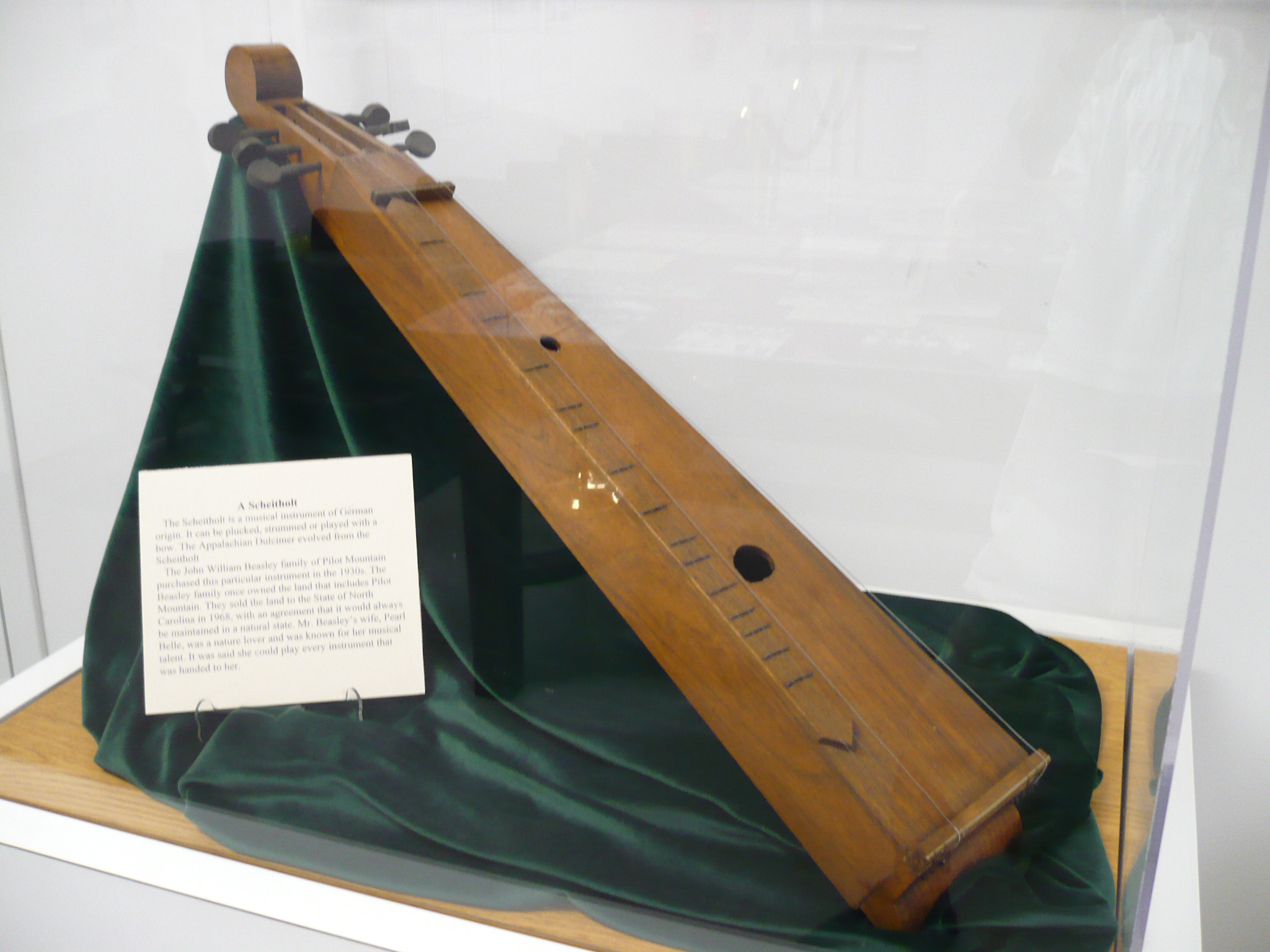
A scheitholt

The scheitholt or scheitholz is a traditional German stringed instrument and an ancestor of the modern zither. It falls into the category of drone zithers.

== History ==
The scheitholt may have derived from an ancient Greek instrument for theoretical education in music and physics, the so-called monochord (an oblong wooden box with only one string). Scheitholt originally referred to logs split into firewood or Scheitholz (from German Scheit 'piece, chip' and Holz 'wood'; compare Low German Holt 'wood'). Since the 16th century, the instrument was called by that name, presumably because it had a similar shape or size. The best known description of this instrument is by Michael Praetorius in 1619. A number of regional names for the instrument exist. In northern Germany the instrument is often called hummel, lit. 'bumble bee' (a reference to the humming sound of the drone strings—the same word was also used for the bagpipe). Other names include the Dutch noordse balk, French bûche or bûche de Meuse, Dutch vlier and Swiss German Hexenscheit.

In the Bavarian-Austrian region, the scheitholt can be traced back to the 14th century. Similar instruments are found in other parts of Northern Europe; in America, the scheitholt was probably brought to Pennsylvania by German settlers and spread into the Appalachian mountain region, where it later evolved into the Appalachian dulcimer in the late 18th century. The Appalachian dulcimer (or mountain dulcimer, or lap dulcimer), is a scheitholt fingerboard mounted on a larger sound box.

== Description ==
The original scheitholt usually consisted of a wooden soundbox about 50 cm (19.7 in) long and 5 cm (2 in) wide, with a simple headstock and two or three strings. Besides brass, these strings were often also made of simple materials such as animal hairs, gut or waxed linen. There is no fingerboard but there are wires which are set in the wood under the strings as frets. Beginning in the 16th and 17th centuries, the scheitholte had three to four strings. In the further development the size of the soundbox was increased, and an independent fingerboard was glued on. From the scheitholt with a change of form the kratzzither or scherrzither developed around the mid-18th century.

== Playing ==
The Scheitholt was played similarly to the modern zither. It was placed horizontally on a table or on the player's lap, the left hand pressed the strings with a wooden stick, sometimes called a "noter", while the thumb and index finger plucked the strings either directly, or with a horn or wooden plectrum, or with a goose quill. Some strings functioned as drones.

The scheitholt or hummel was played well into the 19th century in the alpine regions, in Southern Germany, in Northern Germany, in the Ore Mountains of Saxony and in the Oberlausitz.

== See also ==
- Appalachian dulcimer
- Epinette des Vosges
- Hummel (instrument)
- Langeleik
- Langspil
- Music in Germany

== Literature and websites ==
- Kulturreferat der Landeshauptstadt München (Hrsg.): Das Tiroler Raffele und die Allgäuer Scherrzither, September 1990
- Andreas Michel: Scheitholt und frühe Formen der Kratzzither(in German)
