= Hughes de Courson =

French musician and arranger

Hughes de Courson is a French musician and arranger.

== The Malicorne years ==
Hughes de Courson is best known for being on all of the albums by Malicorne. He played electric guitar, bass, crumhorn, percussion, recorder, positive organ, piano, elka, synthesiser, glockenspiel and Hammond organ. He was producer on some of the albums. His most original track was probably "Vive La Lune" on Balançoire En Feu (1981), which is largely instrumental. It typifies the colourful, bizarre sounds that he later made as a soloist. He also wrote some songs with his school mate, famous writer Patrick Modiano.

== Classical medieval techno ==
Hughes' albums are all large-scale works. He is an arranger rather than a soloist. On many he combines electronic effects with medieval or baroque instruments. Mozart in Egypt takes works by Mozart and emphasises the oriental elements in them. The 25th symphony is played with a much-enlarged orchestra. O'Stravaganza - Vivaldi in Ireland combines traditional Irish music with re-arranged Vivaldi works. "Lambarena, Bach to Africa" mixes African traditional music from Gabon to Johann Sebastian Bach music. Songs of Innocence combines songs by children of the world with clever classical arrangements. Unfortunately his recordings are rarely available in the English-speaking world.

== Discography ==
- Charlemagne (1993)
- Lambarena - Bach to Africa (1995)
- 13 Croquis de Jeunes Filles As (1996)
- Mozart in Egypt (1997)
- Songs of Innocence (1999)
- O'Stravaganza - Vivaldi in Ireland (2001)
- Lux Obscura: Un Projet Electro-Medieval (2003)
- Mozart in Egypt 2 (2005)

He has also produced for almost 100 albums.

== In the media ==
Hughes' song El Vuelo, appeared in 2009, in a series of TV ads for the Canadian airline, Air Canada, promoting new features of their new airplanes. He had help recording this piece from Plovdiv's Children's Choir, of Bulgaria.

Live music

Hughes de Courson wrote 22 music pieces for contemporary ballets, performed by Philippe Decoufle, Karine Saporta, The San Francisco Ballet, and many more. He also performed "Mozart in Egypt" and "O'Stravaganza" in various festivals, and in important events like the Jeddah Islamic Economic Forum in 2008. He is now living in Kuala Lumpur Malaysia, and studies Asian music. He performed an Asian version of Ravel's Bolero in Ho Chi Mihn City in 2010. He writes music for events, mainly in Qatar (Gulf Cup opening show, Asian cup opening show in 2011, Museum of Islamic Arts opening, Mercedes class S presentation in Shanghai, other events in Vietnam, Saudi Arabia, Bahrain, etc...).

Hughes de Courson is willing to make a cross over album based on Malaysian music. He teaches, gives lectures, and is hoping to record his latest piece: "Magic Lutes", although the record industry crisis makes it more difficult nowadays.
