= Hummel (instrument) =

Northern European stringed instrument

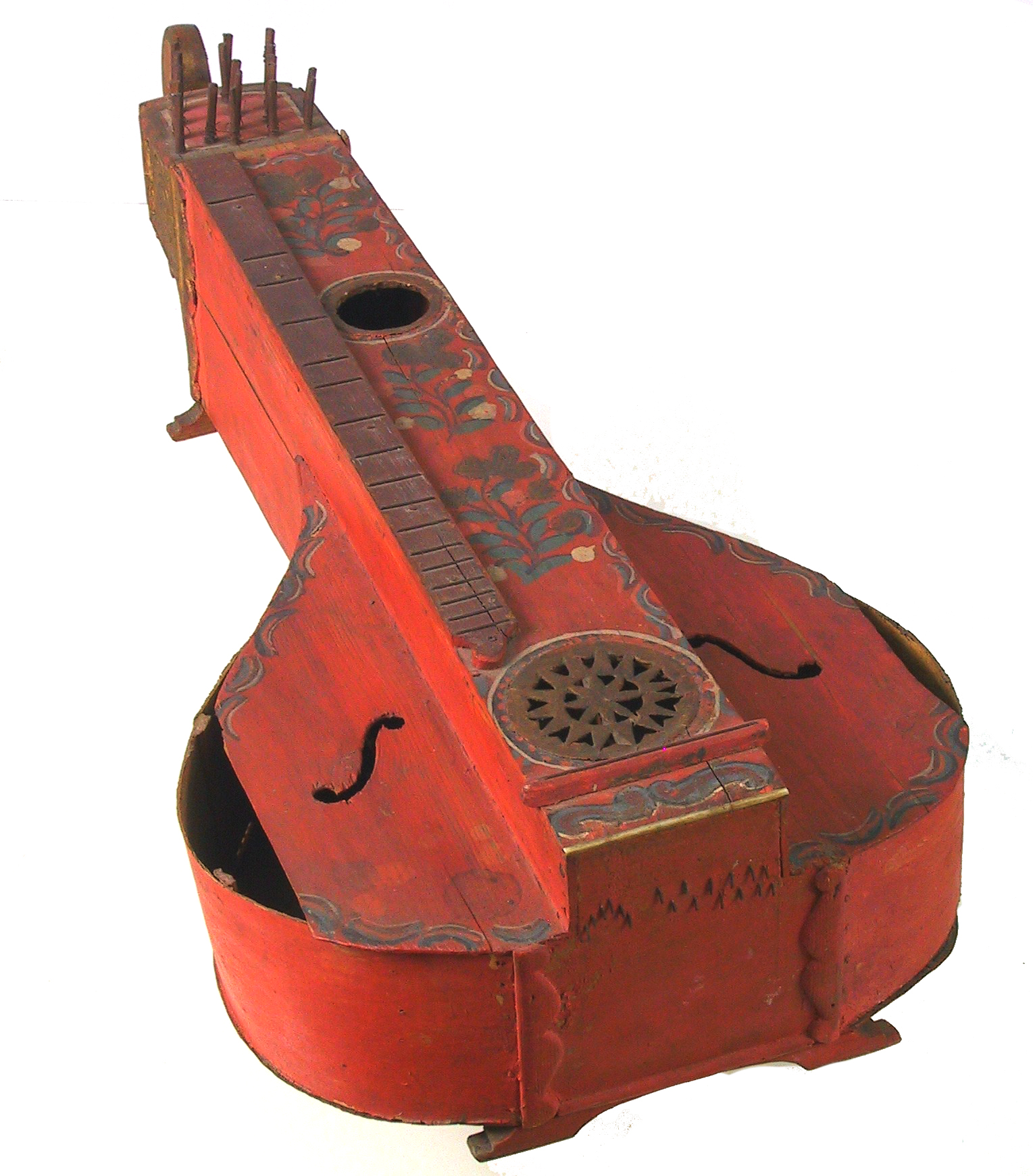
Hummel in collection of KUBEN, Aust-Agder museum og arkiv in Arendal, Norway.

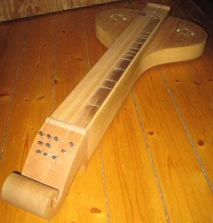

The hummel (also hommel or humle) is an old Northern European stringed instrument similar to an older type of zither and is related to the Norwegian langeleik.

== History ==
The hummel is probably from the Middle Ages, when it was found all over Europe in slightly differing variants. The instrument was common in the Netherlands, Flanders, Northern Germany and Denmark during the 18th century. The earliest evidence of the instrument in Swedish folk culture is from the 17th century, and it seems to have been most common in the southern parts of the country. During the 19th century, the hummel was considered to be a primitive peasant instrument and its popularity dwindled. In Flanders, these instruments appeared during the 17th century and were popular with soldiers in the trenches during World War I, climaxing in the 1920s and 1930s but by the 1930s they returned to obscurity. They were mainly a family instruments and were widely played by women. Some enthusiasts have taken up playing it again since the folk revival of the 1970s.

== Construction ==
The hummel has many related forms. Common to all varieties is a flat top and bottom. There are variations in the type of wood it is made from, but the wood is always thin. On the top of the instrument are one or more soundholes. The strings vary in number, but often include a smaller number of melody strings and a greater number of accompanying strings. It is not uncommon to have three melody strings: two tuned identically, and the third tuned one octave below the others. Under the melody strings, either directly on the body or attached to a fretboard, are about 17 frets. The body comes in two main forms, either a pear-shaped form with the strings in the middle, or a half-pear with the strings near the edge.

== Playing ==
The hummel is placed on a table like a zither, to amplify the sound. The melody strings are sounded by being plucked downwards, either with fingers or a plectrum. The identically tuned melody strings are often fretted in unison or so to create a major third. It is possible to play a sixth interval, through using the octave string. The strings are played with a plectrum and are often all played at once. This is common because the accompaniment strings are tuned to a suitable chord that is relatively open, for example all the strings may be tuned to D or A.

== See also ==
- Appalachian dulcimer
- Epinette des Vosges
- Langeleik
- Langspil
- Scheitholt
