= Glogovica, Ivančna Gorica =

Glogovica
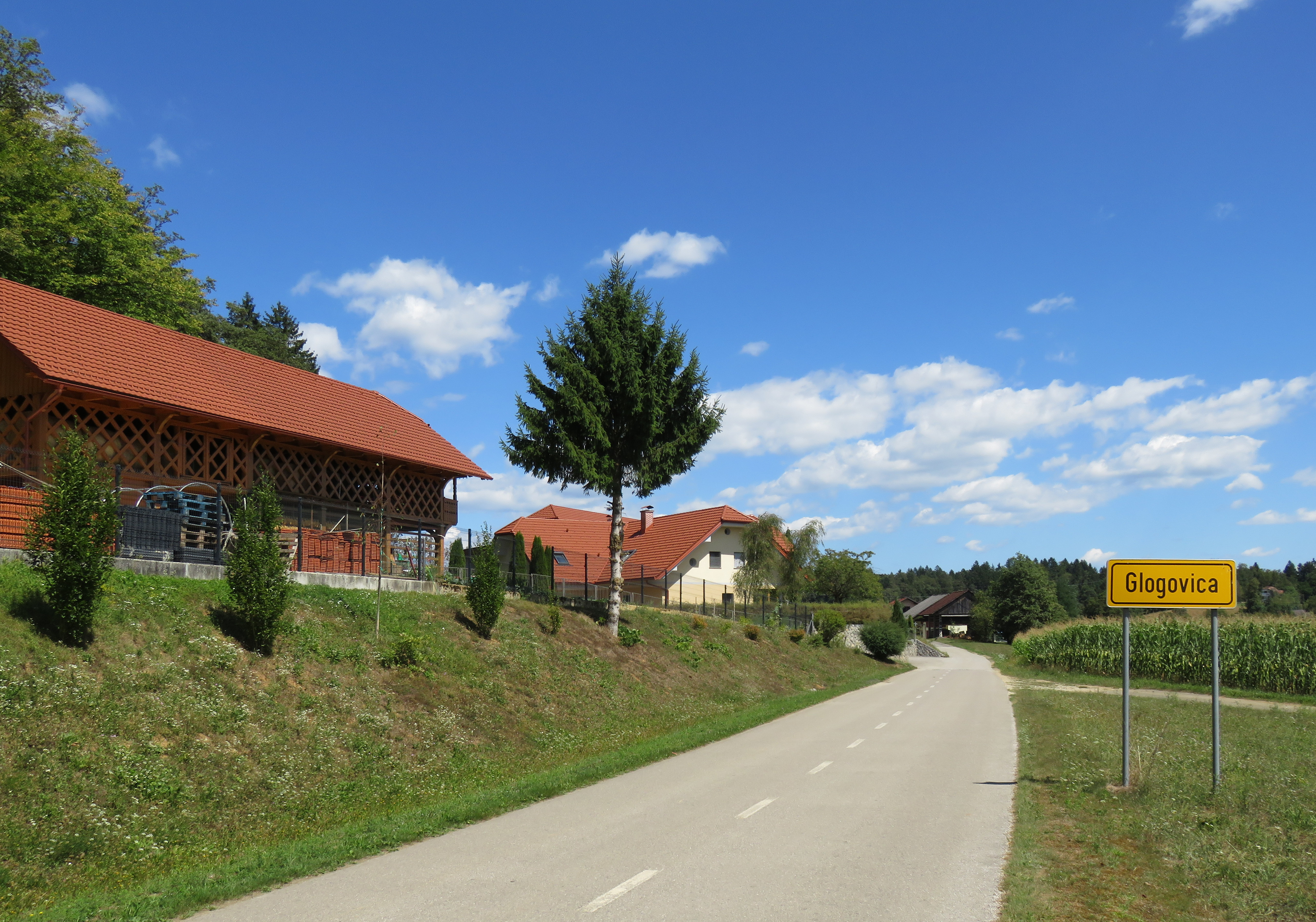

- Location in Slovenia
- Coordinates: 45°56′28.05″N 14°50′4.75″E
- Country: Slovenia
- Traditional region: Lower Carniola
- Statistical region: Central Slovenia
- Municipality: Ivančna Gorica

Area
  - Total: 1.28 km^{2} (0.49 sq mi)
- Elevation: 314.2 m (1,031 ft)

Population (2002)
  - Total: 145

Glogovica (pronounced [ɡlɔˈɡɔːʋitsa] or [ɡlɔˈɡoːʋitsa]) is a settlement in the Municipality of Ivančna Gorica in central Slovenia. It lies east of Ivančna Gorica and south of Šentvid pri Stični in the historical region of Lower Carniola. The municipality is now included in the Central Slovenia Statistical Region.
