= Hexagon (album) =

Studio album by Filligar
- Released: July 27, 2013
- Recorded: Chicago, Illinois, and Los Angeles, California
- Genre: Alternative rock
- Label: Decade Records
- Producer: Filligar

Filligar chronology
The Nerve (2010)	Hexagon (2013)

Hexagon is the sixth studio album by American alternative rock band Filligar. It was released in July 2013 in the United States and September 2013 in the United Kingdom. The title refers to the shape of the cube on the cover, rendered as a hexagon in 2D space.

The album was written in piecemeal while the band was touring in support of their previous album The Nerve. Most of the actual recording was done at Electrical Audio in Chicago.

== Reception ==
Professional ratings
Review scores
Source	Rating
Consequence of Sound	C+
Paste	7.1/10

The album received mixed reviews. Mack Hayden of Paste described the album as "a fun time" that "isn’t going to make any headlines". Connect Savannah magazine described it as having "real soul". Both made comparisons to another Chicago-based band, Wilco. Michael Roffman of Consequence of Sound described it as a "harmless album from a harmless band that’s received harmless press".

== Personnel ==
- Johnny Mathias – guitar and vocals
- Teddy Mathias – bass guitar and backing vocals
- Pete Mathias – drums
- Casey Gibson – keyboards and backing vocals

Production

- Filligar – production
- Greg Norman – engineering, mixing
- Shawn Dealey – engineering, mixing

== Track listing ==
All tracks are written by Filligar.

No.	Title	Length
1.	"New Local"	4:54
2.	"Knock Yourself Out"	3:32
3.	"Lock & Key"	3:27
4.	"Money on the Dark Horse"	7:49
5.	"The Thrill"	2:41
6.	"Digging for Water"	6:21
7.	"Atlas"	4:34
8.	"Great Big Heavy"	3:57
9.	"Culture Bleach"	4:37
10.	"Ozona"	4:53
11.	"Pacific Time"	3:30
12.	"Trepador"	4:59
