= Hexagon Theatre (KwaZulu-Natal) =

Building in Africa

Coordinates: 29.624733°S 30.395699°E

The Hexagon Theatre is a theatre complex that is part of the University of KwaZulu-Natal, Pietermaritzburg campus.
