= Filligar =

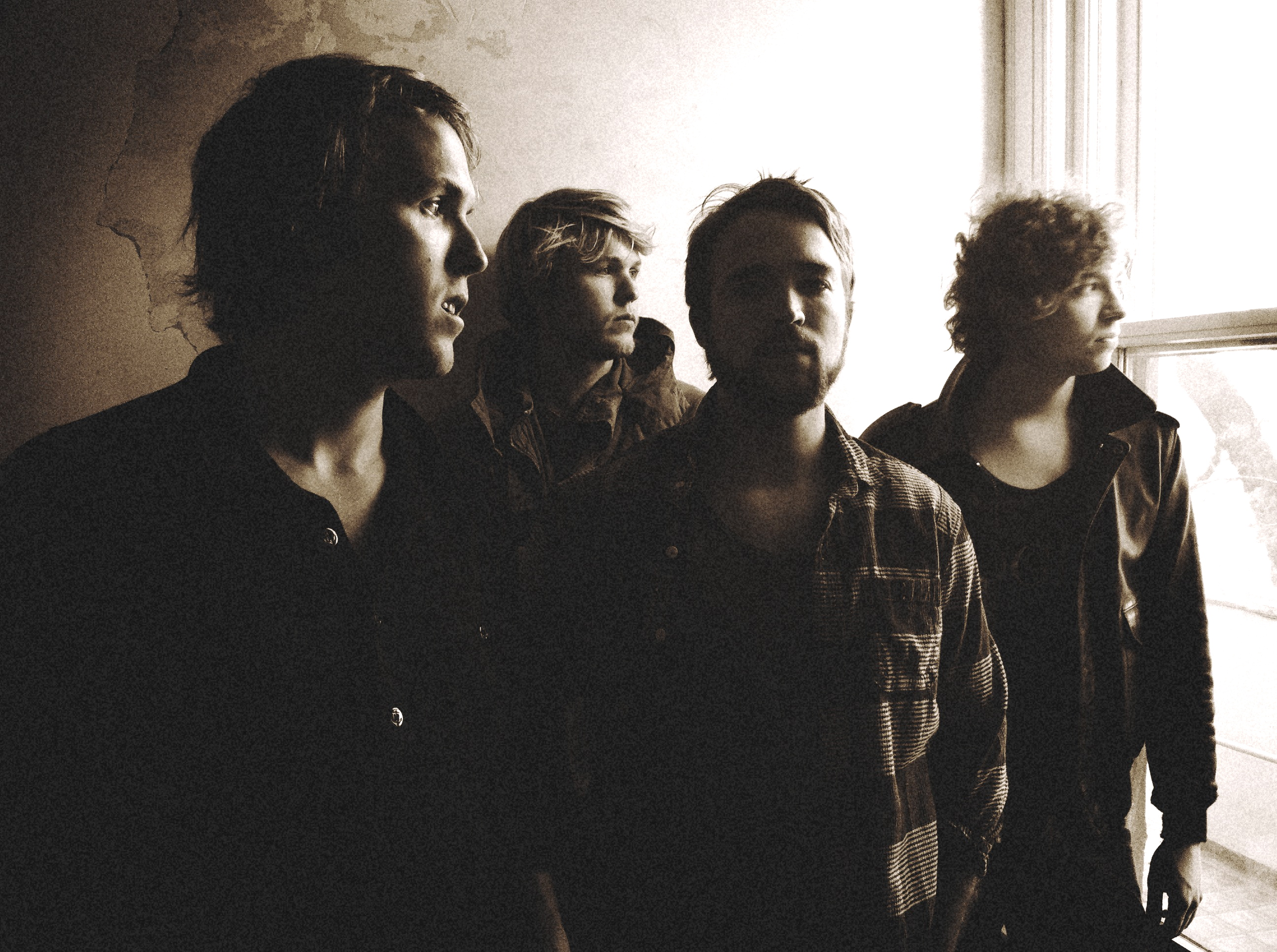
- Filligar (full band)

Background information
- Origin: Chicago, Illinois, United States
- Genres: Alternative rock, indie rock, indie pop, folk rock
- Years active: 2000–present
- Label: Decade Records
- Members: Casey Gibson; Johnny Mathias; Pete Mathias; Teddy Mathias
- Website: Filligar

Filligar is an American alternative rock band which comprises Johnny, Teddy and Pete Mathias as well as childhood friend Casey Gibson. Filligar has a prolific catalog of original music, recognized as "of prestige value" by the American Society of Composers, Authors and Publishers (ASCAP). The band has been called "a fresh take on indie rock" by Paste Magazine, one of music's "Next Big Things" by SPIN and "a breath of fresh air" by Consequence of Sound.

Since 2013 the United States Department of State appointed Filligar cultural ambassadors representing the "American people and their cultural values" and "the best of the U.S. arts community". Under the administrations of both Obama and Trump, the band has been sent on diplomatic assignments to Azerbaijan, Guyana, Kuwait, Russia (Central and Far East), Mexico and Tajikistan. They have played with artists such as The Black Keys, My Morning Jacket, Alabama Shakes, B.o.B, and were hand-picked by Counting Crows to join their Outlaw Roadshow tour.

Filligar's album Keepsakes of the Interior (via Decade Records), was recorded in Los Angeles, California, in the band's studio as well as at Chicago's legendary Electrical Audio. The album marks the band's eighth studio project to date and features singles "Motor Shine" and "White Light Rose". Their 2013 release Hexagon was named "Best New Music" by American Songwriter magazine, and their 2010 release The Nerve was nominated "Best Rock Album" at the Independent Music Awards.

== Albums ==
- New record in progress (2020)
- Keepsakes of the Interior (2015)
- Hexagon (2013)
- The Nerve (2010)
- Near or Far (2008)
- The City Tree (2007)
- Succession, I Guess (2006)
