= Hexagon (disambiguation) =

A hexagon is a polygon with 6 sides.

Hexagon may also refer to:

== Computing ==
- Qualcomm Hexagon, a digital signal processor (DSP) developed by Qualcomm
- Hexagon (software), a 3D modeling application owned by DAZ Productions
- Hexagonal architecture (software), an advanced architecture to structure a software application

== Fiction ==
- The Hexagon, the national military headquarters in Batman (TV series)
- Hexagon Comics, a French comic-book publisher whose characters include a group of super-heroes also called Hexagon
- Hexagons (story), a 2003 short story by Robert Reed

== Music ==
- "Hexagone", a 1975 song by Renaud
- Hexagonal (album), by Leessang
- Hexagon (record label), an electronic music record label and weekly radio show hosted by Don Diablo
- Hexagon (album), an album by Filligar
- Hexagons (EP), an EP by Esben and the Witch
- "Hexagons" (song), a single by Muse

== Science ==
- The hexagonal crystal system for crystallographic or mineralogic uses
- KH-9 Hexagon, a USAF reconnaissance satellite
- Saturn's hexagon, a consistent hexagonal cloud pattern at the north pole of Saturn

== Sports ==
- Exagon Engineering, a French auto racing team
- Hexagonal (CONCACAF), a World Cup qualification stage

== Theater and film ==
- The Hexagon a theatre in Reading, England
- Hexagon Theatre (KwaZulu-Natal), a theatre in Pietermaritzburg, South Africa
- Hexagon (comedy show), a theater company in Washington DC, for charity
- Hexagon Productions, Australian film production company

== Other ==
- Hexagone Balard, the headquarters of the French Armed Forces
- Hexagon AB, a global industrial technology group
- The Hexagon (l'Hexagone), the European part of mainland France (not including Corsica)
- Hexagon, a video game, later becoming Super Hexagon
- Hexagon (restaurant), a Michelin-starred French restaurant in Oakville, Ontario, Canada

== See also ==
- Hexxagōn, a classic game
- Quiz! Hexagon II, a Japanese quiz variety show on Fuji Television
- Hexagon Pool
