= Epinette des Vosges =

Fretted string instrument

String instrument
- Hornbostel–Sachs classification: 314.122 (Box zither)
- Developed: 18th century

Related instruments
- Scheitholt (Germany); Langspil (Iceland); Hummel (Sweden); Appalachian dulcimer

The épinette des Vosges (French pronunciation: [epinɛt dɛ voʒ]) is a traditional plucked-string instrument of the zither family, whose use was confined to two areas in the Vosges mountains of France approximately 50 km apart: around Val-d'Ajol and around Gérardmer.

== Origins ==
The épinette has been attested as early as the 18th century in the Val-d'Ajol and Plombières-les-Bains regions of southern Vosges, whence comes its name. The earlier origins of the épinette des Vosges remain unknown, though some believe the instrument was introduced by the Swedes during the Thirty Years' War. It is, however, also possible that it is descended from the medieval psaltery.

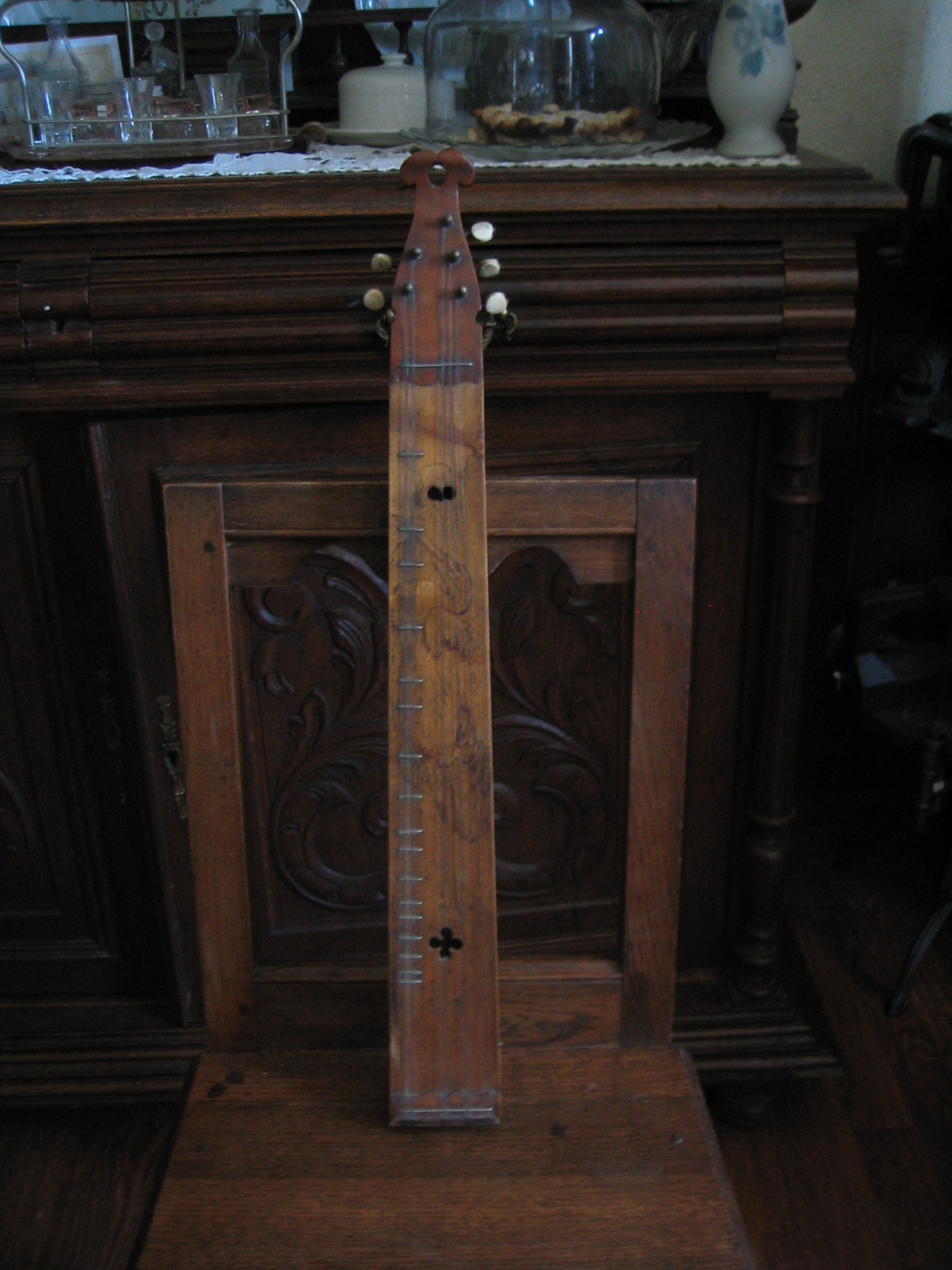
An épinette des Vosges in the museum of Soyotte

== Types of epinette and geographical areas ==
Instruments of this family, formerly widespread throughout Europe, are now primarily found in Norway (the langeleik), Iceland (the langspil), Flanders (the hummel), Hungary, as well as France. A parallel instrument, the Appalachian dulcimer is found in rural mountain areas of the Eastern United States.

=== The Val-d'Ajol épinette ===
This instrument is first attested in accounts dated 1730. The primitive version with four strings evolved into a five-string model. The Val-d'Ajol épinette is of small size, between 50 and 60 cm, in the form of a parallelogram with a wide base. The frets, originally numbering fourteen, increased to seventeen in the 19th century. The fretting is diatonic, tuned to open C major. It is fretted with the fingers of the left hand, or alternately with a small piece of smooth wood. The right hand strums with the thumb, a goose quill, or a pick.

The most prolific épinette luthier was Amé Lambert (1843–1908), who manufactured up to 500 épinettes per year.

=== The Gérardmer épinette ===
This instrument was first attested in 1723. It is a simple instrument built by luthiers, or by the musicians themselves. The instrument fell out of vogue, and little is known about it until it was revived after 1945.

The épinettes of Upper Vosges are large, approximately 80 cm. The number of strings varies from three to eight, with diatonic fretting.

== Playing techniques ==
The épinette is diatonic, producing a heptatonic major scale. The number of frets increased from fourteen to seventeen during the 19th century, giving it a range of two and a half octaves.

- Right-hand techniques:
  1. Strumming back and forth across all the strings (melody and drone) or just the doubled melody strings with the pick, goose feather, or thumb. This is the traditional manner.
  2. Fingerpicking, as with a guitar, using all but the little right finger to pluck the strings.
  3. Striking the strings with a small stick (like a fretted hammered dulcimer)
  4. Using a violin or bowed psaltery bow.
- Left-hand techniques:
  1. Fretting the strings with a smooth stick or reed, called a "noteur" (noter). This gives the music a sliding metallic sound with pronounced glissando.
  2. Fretting the strings with the first three fingers, or all five for more complex pieces or on chromatic instruments. This technique is less traditional but well-suited to playing more complex melodies.

An épinette player usually plays sitting down. The épinette is placed on a table (most often), or on the lap angling away from the player. Unlike other forms of dulcimer, the épinette gives some separation between the melody strings and the drones. Thus, those areas can be struck separately to establish rhythm.

The instrument is tuned by ear rather than to concert pitch, and may be tuned higher or lower depending on the accompanying instrument, the épinette's individual sound, or personal taste.

In addition to the diatonic épinette, there are epinettes with added frets for each semi-tone, in order to compose the chromatic scale. On a chromatic épinette, one can play in any key without re-tuning.

=== The modes ===
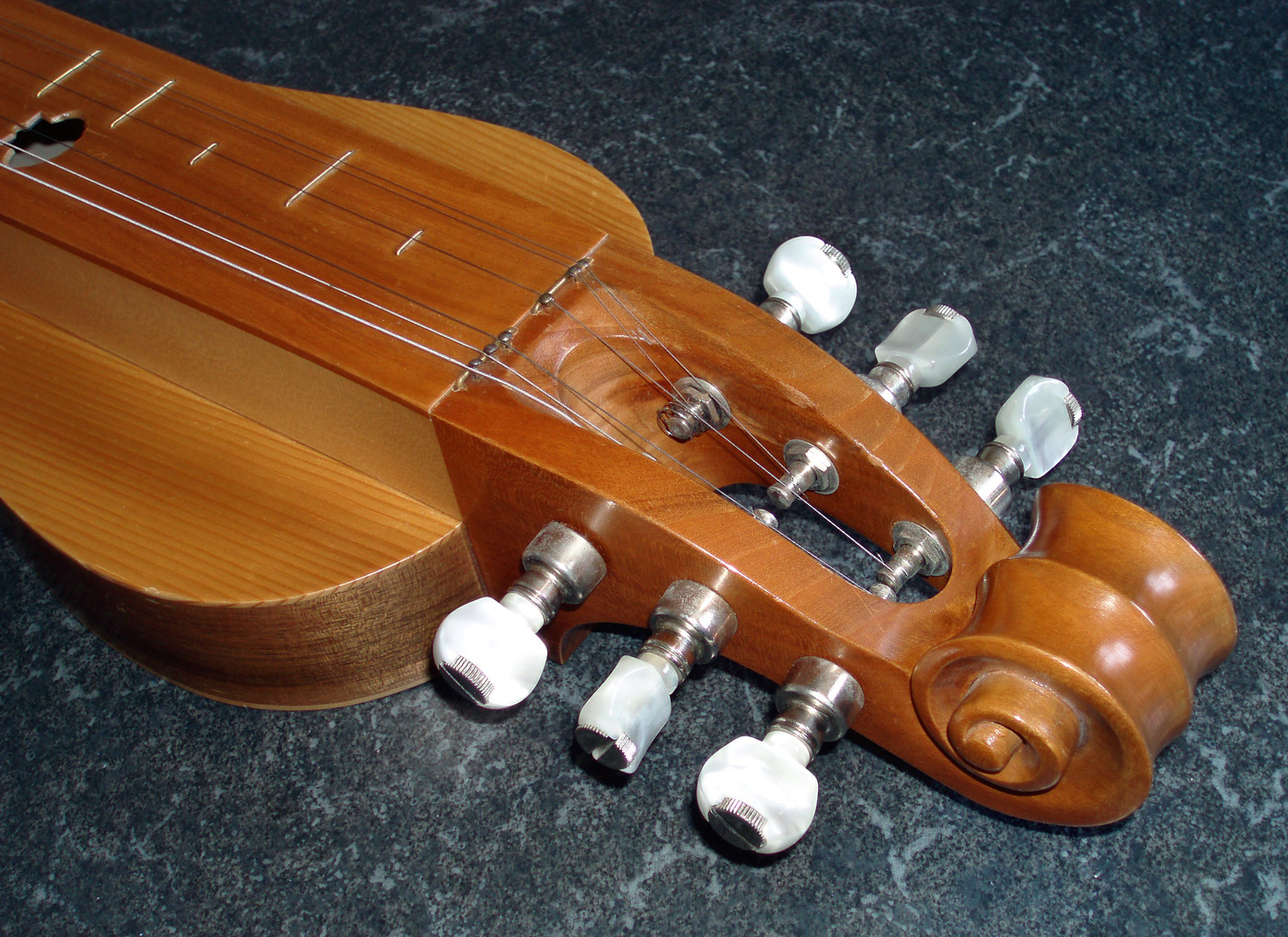
Chevillier (headstock) of a chromatic epinette des Vosges

The épinette allows one to play modal music. The table below presents a basic example (the arrangements of the drones varies according to their number and the player's tastes)

The possible modes are:

Mode	Starting point of the left hand	Tuning of 1st string	2nd string	3rd string
C (DO)	Unstopped melody strings	G (SOL)	C (DO)	C (DO) or G (SOL)
D (RE)	1st case	A (LA)	D (RE)	A (LA) or D (RE)
E (MI)	2nd case	B (SI)	E (MI)	B (SI) or E (MI)
F (FA) 1st style	3rd case	C (DO)	F (FA)	C (DO) or F (FA)
F (FA) 2nd style	6th case	F (FA)	C (DO)	C (DO) or F (FA)
G (SOL)	Unstopped melody strings	G (SOL)	D (RE)	G (SOL) or D (RE)
A (LA)	1st case	A (LA)	E (MI)	A (LA) or E (MI)
B (SI)	2nd case	B (SI)	F (FA)	B (SI) or F (FA)

== Epinette players ==
- Jean-François Dutertre
- Jean-Loup Baly
- Christophe Toussaint
- Patrice Gilbert
- Jacques Leininger

== Contemporary makers ==
- Christophe Toussaint, Dommartin-lès-Remiremont
- Jean-Claude Condi, Mirecourt

== Discography ==
- Jean-François Dutertre La ronde des Milloraines
- Jean-François Dutertre Si l'amour prenait racine
- Jean-François Dutertre L'épinette des Vosges
- Christophe Toussaint Terra Incognita
- Association de l'épinette des Vosges, Plombières-les-Bains A la découverte de l'épinette des Vosges
- Association de l'épinette des Vosges, Plombières-les-Bains Trois dames à table

== See also ==
- Appalachian dulcimer
- Hummel (instrument)
- Langeleik
- Langspil
- Scheitholt

== Bibliography ==
- L'instrument de musique populaire, usage et symboles, musée des arts et traditions populaires, 1980, ISBN 2-7118-0172-1
- Méthode d'épinette par Christophe Toussaint. Édition princeps 2004. 2ème édition 2007.
