= January 1928 =

Month of 1928

<<	January 1928					>>
Su	Mo	Tu	We	Th	Fr	Sa
1	2	3	4	5	6	7
8	9	10	11	12	13	14
15	16	17	18	19	20	21
22	23	24	25	26	27	28
29	30	31

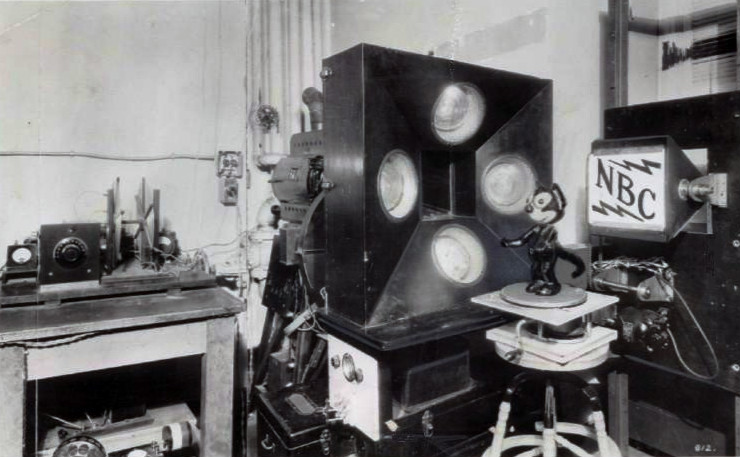
January 13, 1928: General Electric Company and NBC make first television broadcast

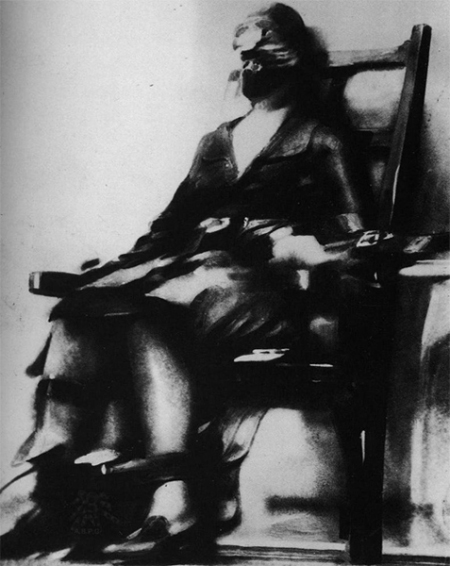
January 12, 1928: Murderer Ruth Snyder executed in the electric chair, secretly photographed by New York's Daily News

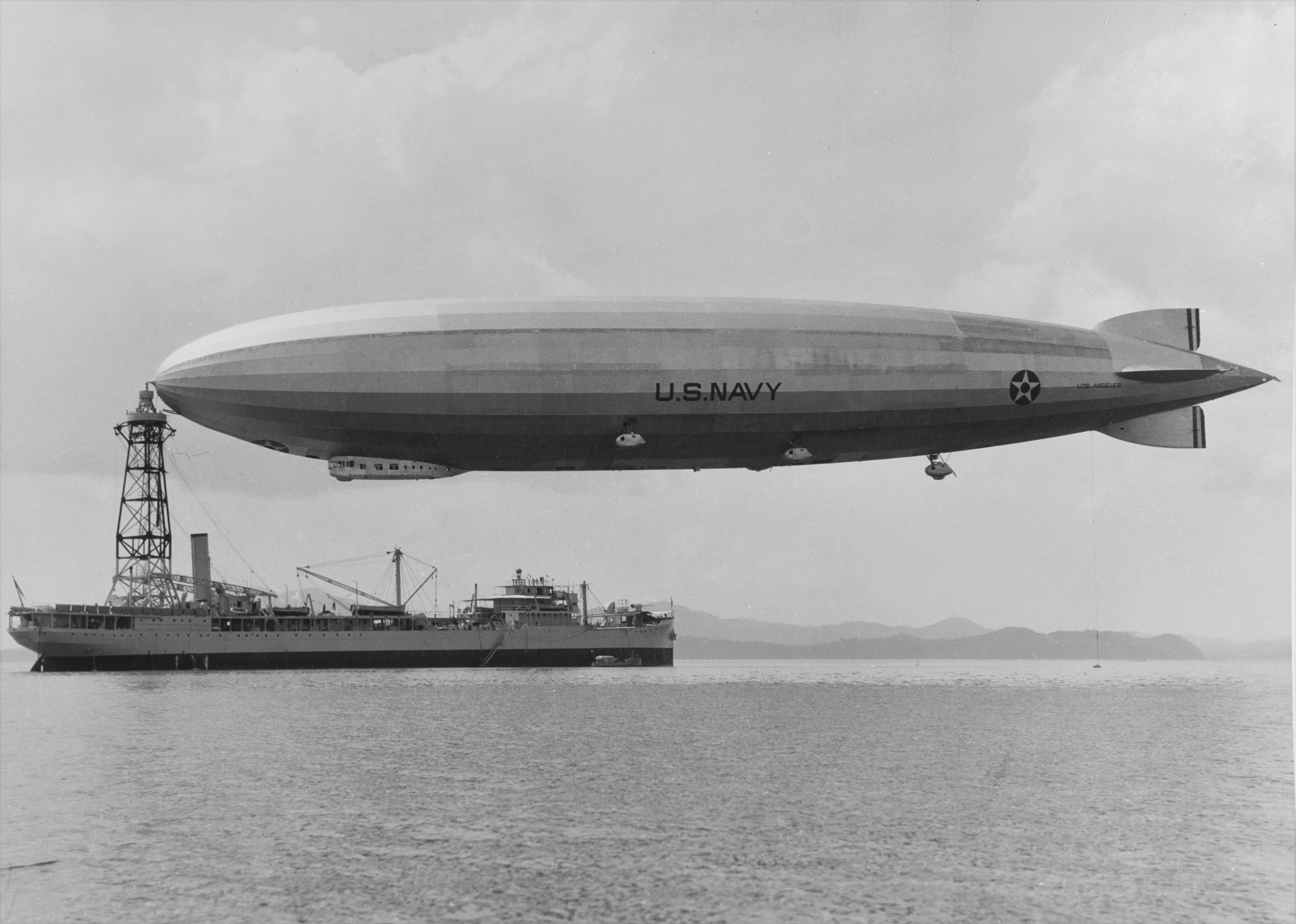
January 27, 1928: The Los Angeles becomes the first dirigible to make a landing on a ship, touching down on the aircraft carrier USS Saratoga

The following events occurred in January 1928:

== Sunday, January 1, 1928 ==
- The Battle of Las Cruces was fought in Nicaragua.
- In Nicaragua, five U.S. Marines were killed and 23 wounded in a clash with followers of Sandino.
- Nearly 250,000 domestic slaves in the British Protectorate of Sierra Leone were freed by decree of 1927.
- Eastern Bloc emigration and defection: Boris Bazhanov, Joseph Stalin's personal secretary, crossed the border to Iran to defect from the Soviet Union.
- Died: Loie Fuller, 65, American dancer

== Monday, January 2, 1928 ==
- Stanford University edged the University of Pittsburgh Panthers 7–6 in the Rose Bowl.
- A diplomatic row broke out following the discovery by an Austrian customs official on the Hungarian border of five carloads of machine gun parts falsely labeled as machine parts in a shipment from Italy heading towards Czechoslovakia.
- Born:
  - Robert Goralski, American journalist, in Chicago (d. 1988)
  - Daisaku Ikeda, Japanese Buddhist philosopher and activist; Ōta, Tokyo (d. 2023)
  - Kate Molale, South African political activist (d. 1980)
  - Dan Rostenkowski, U.S. Congressman for 38 years, later convicted of corruption; in Chicago (d. 2010)
- Died: Emily Stevens, 45, American actress

== Tuesday, January 3, 1928 ==
- The United States ordered the deployment of 1,000 additional Marines and five destroyers to Nicaragua.
- The Senussi leader in Cyrenaica surrendered to Italy, bringing the colony of Italian Libya fully under Italian control.
- Died:
  - Dorothy Donnelly, 47, American actress, playwright, producer and director

== Wednesday, January 4, 1928 ==
- Half of England was under water due to flooding.

== Thursday, January 5, 1928 ==
- The first electric train by present-day Western Railway (at that time: Bombay Baroda & Central India Railway) ran between Colaba (now Churchgate) and Borivali with a 1500 V DC traction.
- Charles Lindbergh landed in Nicaragua during his goodwill tour of Latin America where he met President Adolfo Díaz.
- Born:
  - Zulfikar Ali Bhutto, 4th President and 9th Prime Minister of Pakistan, in Larkana, British India (d. 1979);
  - Walter Mondale, U.S. Senator and 42nd Vice President of the United States, in Ceylon, Minnesota (d. 2021)

== Friday, January 6, 1928 ==
- The Charlie Chaplin silent comedy film The Circus premiered at the Strand Theatre in New York City.
- A 92 m.p.h. gale struck the British Isles, increasing the high risk of flooding even further.
- Italian Finance Minister Giuseppe Volpi banned industries from taking out foreign loans without government approval.
- Born: George H. Ross, American businessman and TV personality, in Brooklyn, New York
- Died: Alvin Kraenzlein, 51, American track-and-field athlete

== Saturday, January 7, 1928 ==
- 1928 Thames flood: The River Thames burst its banks in London shortly after midnight, killing 14. Westminster Abbey, the Tate Gallery and the Tower of London were among the buildings flooded.
- Charles Lindbergh flew to Costa Rica where he was greeted by President Ricardo Jiménez Oreamuno along with a huge crowd.
- Born: William Peter Blatty, American writer and filmmaker known for The Exorcist; in New York City (d. 2017)

== Sunday, January 8, 1928 ==
- The flood tide in London passed at 2:18 a.m.
- The Emir of Afghanistan Amānullāh Khān and his wife Soraya Tarzi arrived in Rome during their first visit to Europe.

== Monday, January 9, 1928 ==
- A council in Rome declared that the city's new coat of arms would include a fasces along with the Savoy cross.
- Charles Lindbergh flew to Panama where President Rodolfo Chiari presented him with a medal and praised him for "establishing a basis of fraternity, and bringing together all of the American countries on a basis of real understanding."
- Born: Domenico Modugno, Italian singer, songwriter, actor and politician, in Polignano a Mare (d. 1994)

== Tuesday, January 10, 1928 ==
- New York Governor Al Smith denied clemency to convicted murderer Ruth Snyder and her partner Henry Gray.
- The New York Giants traded star player-manager Rogers Hornsby to the Boston Braves for Shanty Hogan and Jimmy Welsh.
- Born: Philip Levine, American poet, in Detroit (d. 2015)

== Wednesday, January 11, 1928 ==
- A U.S. Senate committee released its findings of an inquiry into alleged documents charging that Mexican President Plutarco Elías Calles was conspiring against the United States by secretly funding anti-American revolutionary activities in Nicaragua as well as bribing senators to support Mexico-friendly policies. The investigation concluded that the documents were forged, which came as a blow to the reputation of William Randolph Hearst who had broken the story in his newspapers. Pennsylvania Senator and committee leader David A. Reed said that "in dealing with the reputations of four senators it was incumbent upon Mr. Hearst to exhaust every avenue in seeking to verify the documents before printing them."
- Voters in Haiti overwhelmingly approved thirteen amendments to the Constitution in a national referendum.
- Born: David L. Wolper, American television and film producer, in New York City (d. 2010)
- Died: Thomas Hardy, 87, English novelist and poet

== Thursday, January 12, 1928 ==
- An order staying the execution of Ruth Snyder signed by Supreme Court Justice Aaron J. Levy was served to the warden of Sing Sing Prison shortly after 2 a.m., based on a plea by her lawyers that her presence as a witness was required in the litigation over the insurance left by her murdered husband. In response, New York Attorney General Albert Ottinger ruled that the stay of execution granted by Supreme Court Justice Levy was not binding. and Snyder and her partner in crime, Henry Judd Gray, were executed at a few minutes past 11 p.m.
- The Italian press was banned from reporting suicides or sensational crimes.
- Died: Ruth Snyder, 32, American murderer (executed by electric chair)

== Friday, January 13, 1928 ==
- General Electric demonstrated the potential of television by broadcasting into three homes in Schenectady, New York. Company officials, engineers and journalists gathered in each of the three locations were able to see and hear a radio announcer on a 2-inch x 2 inch screen.
- The New York Daily News published a surreptitiously-taken photograph of the Ruth Snyder execution in an extra edition and reprinted it the following day. Together, the two editions sold an extra 1.5 million copies, despite an uproar.

== Saturday, January 14, 1928 ==
- The silent film The Divine Woman, starring Greta Garbo, premiered at the Capitol Theatre in New York City.
- The U.S. government announced plans to restore Ford's Theatre in Washington, D.C., and install an Abraham Lincoln museum.
- Died: Al Reach, 87, American baseball player

== Sunday, January 15, 1928 ==
- U.S. President Calvin Coolidge paid a visit to Cuba for the Pan American Conference, and was welcomed in Havana. His visit marked the last of a U.S. President to Cuba for 88 years, until the arrival of Barack Obama in 2016.
- Born: Joanne Linville, American actress, in Bakersfield, California (d. 2021)

== Monday, January 16, 1928 ==
- The sixth Pan-American Conference opened in Havana.
- Born:
  - William Kennedy, American novelist and journalist; in Albany, New York
  - Pilar Lorengar, Spanish soprano, in Zaragoza (d. 1996)

== Tuesday, January 17, 1928 ==
- Huey Long won the Louisiana gubernatorial election.
- Born:
  - Vidal Sassoon, English hairdresser, businessman and philanthropist, in Hammersmith, London (d. 2012)
  - Jean Barraqué, French composer, in Puteaux, Paris (d. 1973)

== Wednesday, January 18, 1928 ==
- Nicaraguan rebel leader Augusto César Sandino was rumored to have been killed in a U.S. bombing raid.
- The silent film Gentlemen Prefer Blondes, based on the hit Anita Loos novel of the same name, was released.
- Belgian biopharmaceutical manufacturing company UCB was founded by Emmanuel Janssen in Brussels.
- Born: Franciszek Pieczka, Polish actor, in Godow (d. 2022)
- Died: Black Gold, 6, racehorse and 1924 Kentucky Derby winner

== Thursday, January 19, 1928 ==
- Otto Gessler resigned as Germany's Minister of Defence amid accusations of financial anomalies in his ministry.
- Born:
  - Len Szafaryn, American football player, in Ambridge, Pennsylvania (d. 1990)
  - Prince Tomislav of Yugoslavia, son of King Alexander I; in Belgrade (d. 2000)
- Died: Hans Hinrich Wendt, 74, German Protestant theologian

== Friday, January 20, 1928 ==
- Wilhelm Groener became the new German Minister of Defence.
- The American Federation of Labor said it would ask both the Republican and Democratic party platform committees to consider modification of the Volstead Act to permit the manufacture of 2.75 percent beer.

== Saturday, January 21, 1928 ==
- County court judges in Pittsburgh ruled that Sunday symphony concerts did not violate the local blue laws, explaining that such laws were "evidently intended to forbid actual physical, material interference with the quiet rest of the Sabbath day, and not to forbid the obviously harmless and even ancient custom of the rendition of music on that day."
- Al Capone announced that he would accept the request of Miami authorities to leave the city, in response to protests from civic organizations. "If I am not wanted here I will leave immediately", Capone said. "Where I will go from here I have not decided."
- Born: Gene Sharp, American political theorist of nonviolent action; in North Baltimore, Ohio (d. 2018)
- Died:
  - Nikolai Astrup, 47, Norwegian painter
  - George Washington Goethals, 69, American army officer and civil engineer
  - John de Robeck, 65, British naval officer

== Sunday, January 22, 1928 ==
- The Women's Freedom League sent a message to Prime Minister Stanley Baldwin protesting that women were excluded from holding posts in diplomatic and consular services around the Empire.
- The Josef von Sternberg-directed silent film The Last Command starring Emil Jannings was released.
- Born:
  - Yoshihiko Amino, Japanese historian, in Yamanashi Prefecture (d. 2004)
  - Birch Bayh, American politician, U.S Senator for Indiana (1963-1981); in Terre Haute, Indiana, (d. 2019)

== Monday, January 23, 1928 ==
- Norway formally annexed Bouvet Island by royal decree.
- 21 federal prisoners escaped from Wayne County Jail in Michigan via a tunnel dug through a six-inch brick wall.
- The American Society of Heating and Venting Engineers released its findings of a study determining the dirtiest city in America. St. Louis was named the dirtiest, followed by Cincinnati, Pittsburgh, Detroit and then Chicago. Boston was named the cleanest of the 24 cities studied.
- Born:
  - Chico Carrasquel, Venezuelan baseball player, in Caracas (d. 2005)
  - Jeanne Moreau, French actress, singer, screenwriter and director; in Paris (d. 2017)

== Tuesday, January 24, 1928 ==
- The D. W. Griffith-directed silent romance film Drums of Love premiered at the Liberty Theatre in New York City.
- Twenty-six Hungarian soldiers were killed in an accident near Diósgyőr when a truck slammed into a stone wall.
- Born:
  - Desmond Morris, English zoologist, ethologist and painter; in Purton, Wiltshire
  - Michel Serrault, French actor, in Brunoy (d. 2007)

== Wednesday, January 25, 1928 ==
- The Emir of Afghanistan Amānullāh Khān and his wife Soraya Tarzi arrived in Paris, riding in a procession down the Champs-Élysées in an open car.
- The Avalon Theater opened in Brooklyn.
- Born:
  - Cor van der Hart, Netherlands footballer, in Amsterdam (d. 2006)
  - Eduard Shevardnadze, President of Georgia 1995 to 2003, Foreign Minister of the Soviet Union 1985 to 1990; in Mamati, Transcaucasian SFSR, Soviet Union (d. 2014)

== Thursday, January 26, 1928 ==
- Volcanic activity on the Pacific island of Krakatoa caused a new volcanic cone to emerge from below sea level. This new island was called Anak Krakatoa, or "Child of Krakatoa".
- Born: Roger Vadim, filmmaker, in Paris, France (d. 2000)
- Died: William A. Carroll, 53, American silent film actor

== Friday, January 27, 1928 ==
- A dirigible landed on an aircraft carrier for the first time in history when the Los Angeles was moored to the mast of the Saratoga in the Atlantic Ocean, allowing the passengers and crew to descend to the Saratoga's deck.
- Charles Lindbergh flew to Bogotá, Colombia, where he was welcomed by a crowd of 15,000.
- The historic Redford Theater opened in Redford (Detroit), Michigan.
- Born: Hans Modrow, the last Premier of East Germany, from 1989 until its 1990 reunification with West Germany; in Jasenitz, Free State of Prussia, Germany (now Jasienica, Poland) (d. 2023)

== Saturday, January 28, 1928 ==
- Christopher Hornsrud replaced Ivar Lykke as Prime Minister of Norway.
- Born: Pete Runnels, American baseball player, in Lufkin, Texas (d. 1991)
- Died: Vicente Blasco Ibáñez, 60, Spanish writer and politician

== Sunday, January 29, 1928 ==
- Charles Lindbergh flew to Venezuela and met with President Juan Vicente Gómez.
- Died:
  - Henry C. Brewster, 82, American politician
  - Douglas Haig, 1st Earl Haig, 66, British general of the First World War

== Monday, January 30, 1928 ==
- The controversial Eugene O'Neill stage play Strange Interlude premiered at the John Golden Theatre on Broadway.
- A special train carrying Irish President W. T. Cosgrave derailed at Limoges, Ontario, Canada on its way to Ottawa. A foreman was killed but no one in the presidential entourage was injured. Cosgrave arrived in Ottawa three hours late and attended a dinner with Prime Minister William Lyon Mackenzie King.
- Born:
  - Mitch Leigh, musical theatre composer and theatrical producer known for Man of La Mancha; in Brooklyn, New York City (d. 2014)
  - Hal Prince, musical theatre producer and director known for Fiddler on the Roof and West Side Story, winner of 281 Tony Awards; in Manhattan, New York City (d. 2019)
- Died: Johannes Fibiger, 60, Danish scientist and recipient of the 1926 Nobel Prize in Physiology or Medicine for a discovery later disproved

== Tuesday, January 31, 1928 ==
- Charles Lindbergh flew to Saint Thomas, U.S. Virgin Islands, using a golf course west of the city as a landing strip, and met with the local governor.
- Died: Leopold Greville, 6th Earl of Warwick, 45, British Army General who commanded two Canadian Infantry brigade
