= November 1927 =

Month of 1927

<<	November 1927					>>
Su	Mo	Tu	We	Th	Fr	Sa
		1	2	3	4	5
6	7	8	9	10	11	12
13	14	15	16	17	18	19
20	21	22	23	24	25	26
27	28	29	30

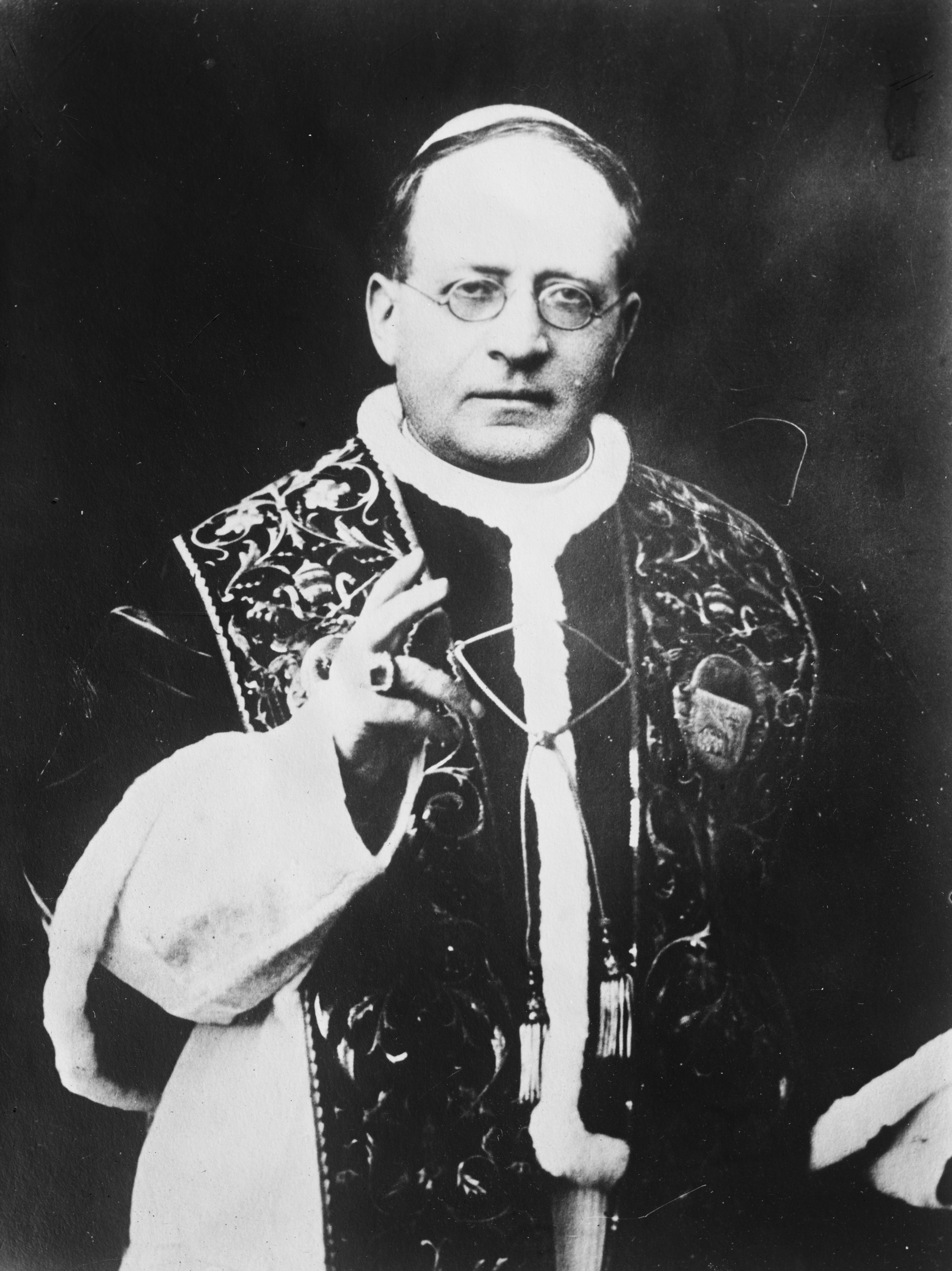
November 7, 1927: Pope Pius XI rules that marriages performed in airplanes and balloons are valid

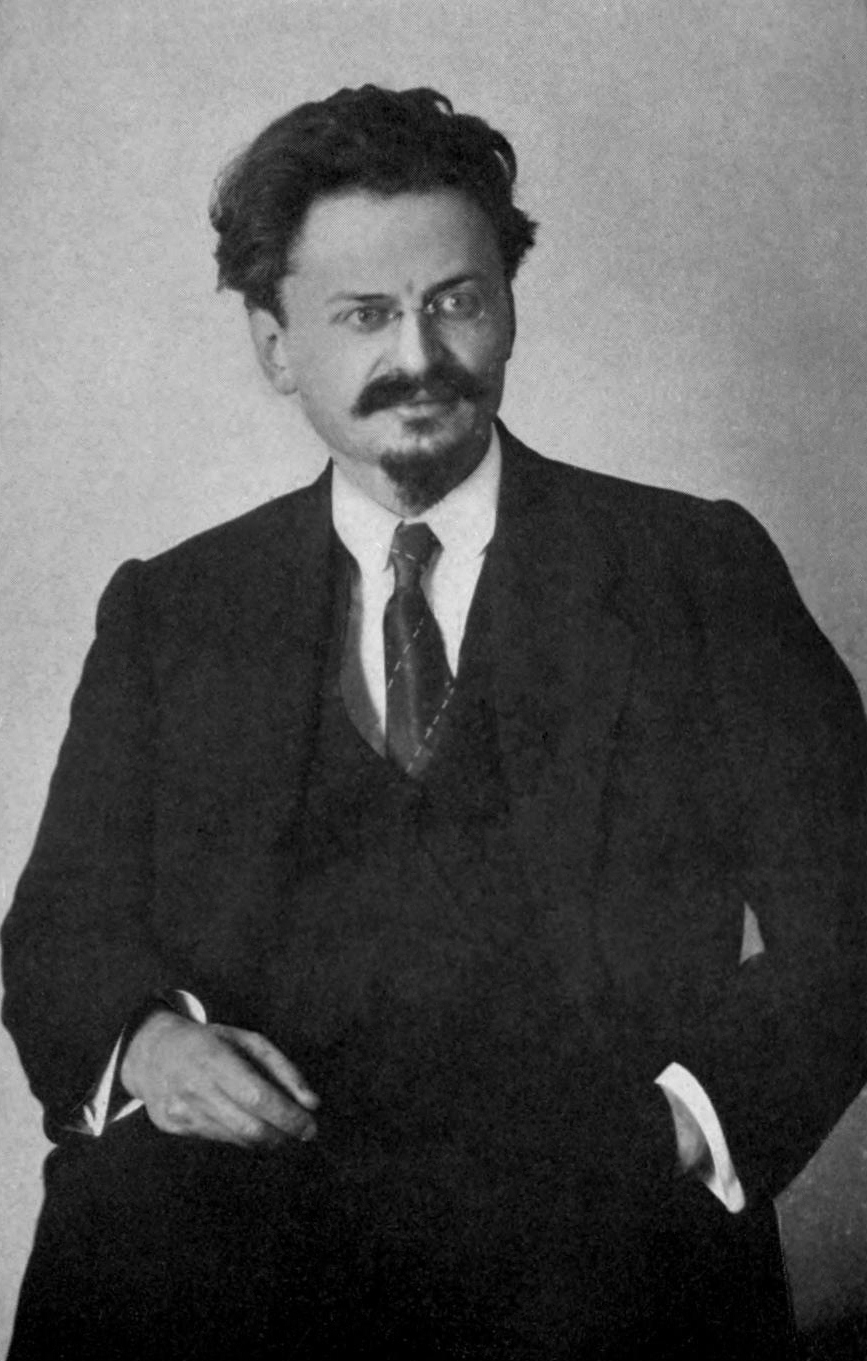
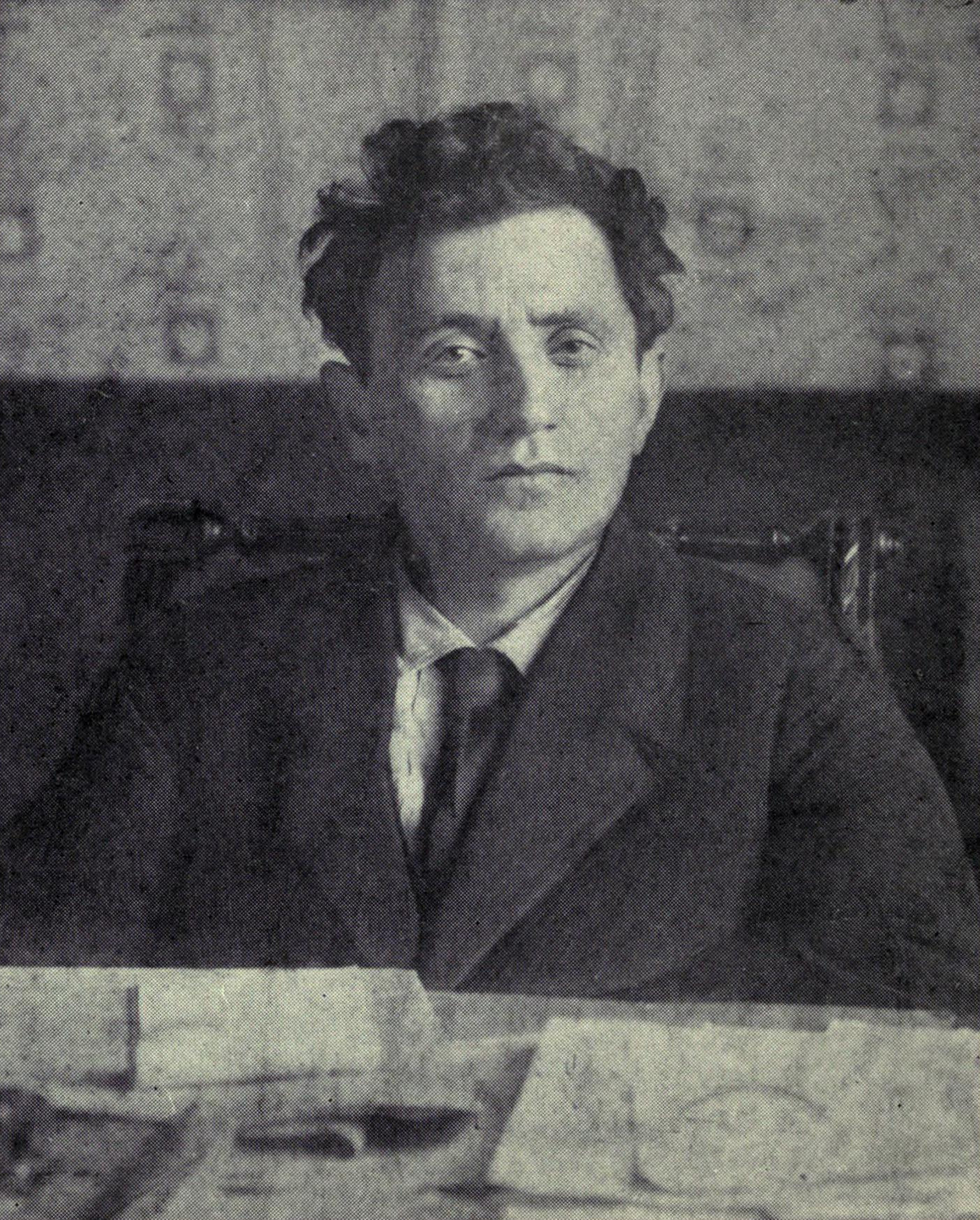
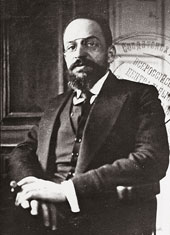
November 14, 1927: Leaders Leon Trotsky, Grigory Zinoviev and Adolph Joffe expelled by the Soviet Communist Party as Joseph Stalin takes control.

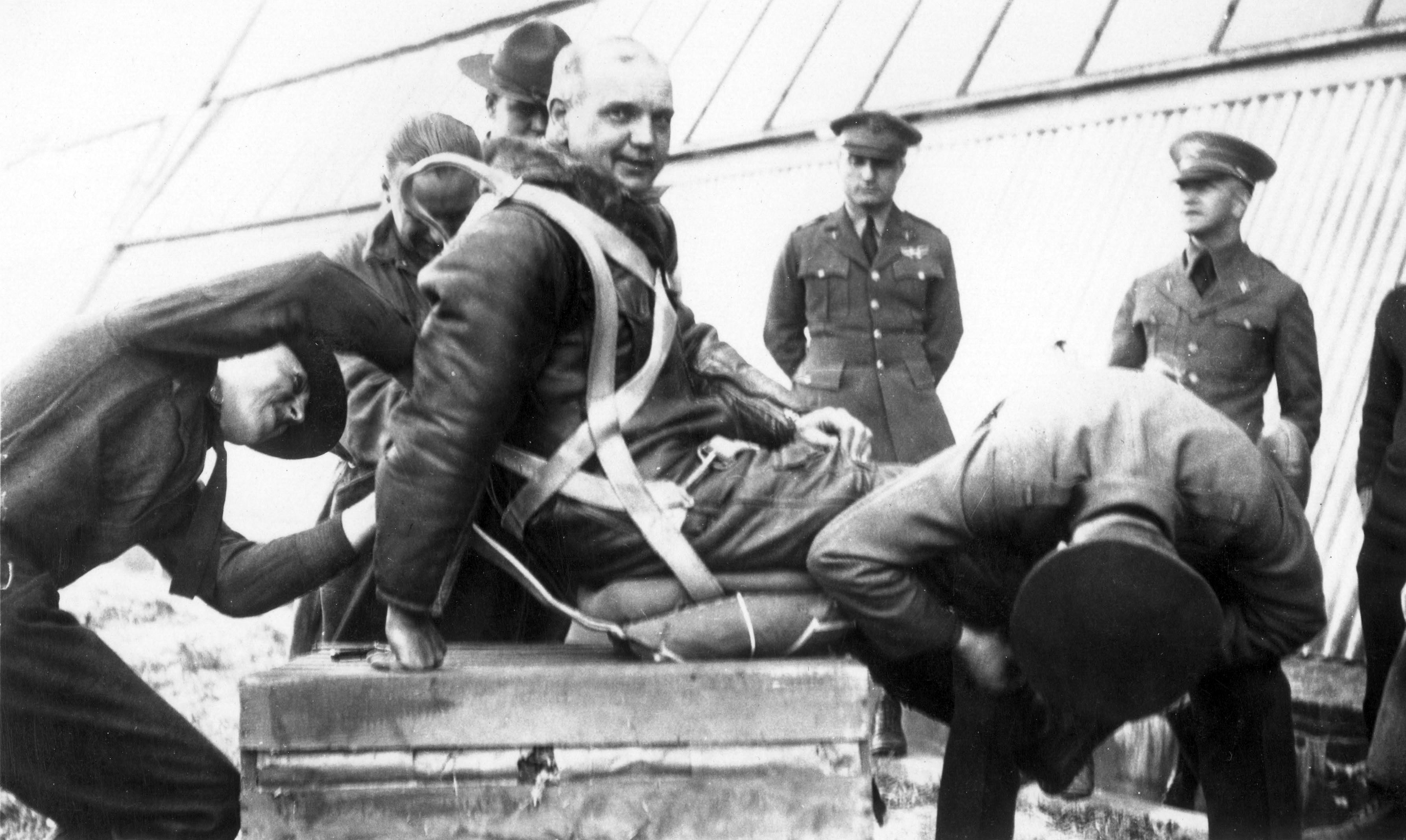
November 4, 1927: Balloon pilot Hawthorne C. Gray makes fatal attempt to break the official world altitude record.

The following events occurred in November 1927:

== November 1, 1927 (Tuesday) ==
- The first communist government in China was proclaimed by Peng Pai, encompassing the counties of Haifeng and Lufeng near Hong Kong. The "Haifeng Soviet of Workers, Peasants and Soldiers" was created three weeks later, but Nationalist Chinese troops recaptured the area four months later.
- The first currency for the British Mandate in Palestine, the "Palestine pound", was introduced. After the creation of Israel and the independence of Jordan, and a redemption offer, the Palestine pound ceased to be legal tender after 1952.
- Died:
  - Florence Mills, 32, African-American performer, died of complications from an appendectomy.
  - Karl Plauth, 31, aircraft designer and World War One ace who had downed 17 planes for Germany, was killed in a flying accident when the Junkers A 32 he was piloting failed to pull up after he made a loop.

== November 2, 1927 (Wednesday) ==
- The Soviet Communist Party declared an amnesty for former White Army officers.
- American native T. S. Eliot became a naturalized British citizen.
- Born: Steve Ditko, American comic-book writer and artist, co-creator of Spider-Man; in Johnstown, Pennsylvania (d. 2018)

== November 3, 1927 (Thursday) ==
- Rainfall began in Vermont, continuing into the next day, claiming its first victims. Described as the "worst natural disaster in the state's history". The final death toll was 132 people, of which 114 were in Vermont.
- Forty people were killed at the Sydney Harbour when the steamer Tahiti struck the passenger ferry Greycliffe.
- The Bridge of San Luis Rey, by Thornton Wilder, was first published in the United States. The first run of 4,500 copies was priced at $2.50 and sold out within a month.
- The Rodgers and Hart musical A Connecticut Yankee, based on Mark Twain's novel A Connecticut Yankee in King Arthur's Court, was first performed, at the Vanderbilt Theater on Broadway.
- Born:
  - Marius Barnard, South African cardiac surgeon and pioneer in that nation's critical illness insurance; in Beaufort West (d. 2014)
  - Odvar Nordli, Prime Minister of Norway 1976 to 1981; in Tangen (d. 2018)
  - Peggy McCay, American stage and television actress; in New York City (d. 2018)

== November 4, 1927 (Friday) ==
- A cyclone struck the town of Nellore, 98 miles (158 km) northwest of Madras in India, killing almost 300 people.
- Legalized and state regulated prostitution in Germany, known as the "Bremen System", was abolished.
- United States Army Air Corps Captain Hawthorne C. Gray, 38, who had reached a record altitude of 42,470 feet (12,940 meters) in a balloon on May 4, attempted to set an official record. Because his timer failed, he ran out of bottled oxygen while at an altitude of 40,000 feet (12,000 m), lost consciousness, and died. His body and the balloon were found in a tree near Sparta, Tennessee, the next day.
- The 7.3 M_{w} Lompoc earthquake shook the Central Coast of California with a maximum Mercalli intensity of VIII (Severe), causing moderate damage and a non-destructive tsunami.
- The drama film Uncle Tom's Cabin, based on Harriet Beecher Stowe's novel of the same name and starring Margarita Fischer and Arthur Edmund Carewe was released.

== November 5, 1927 (Saturday) ==
- The Saturday Evening Post published the article "The Seeing Eye", written by Dorothy Harrison Eustis, introducing Americans to the news from Germany about dogs trained to assist blind veterans. Morris Frank, a 20-year-old blind man in Nashville, wrote back to Eustis, who was inspired to train the first American seeing eye dog in the United States. Frank began using the dog the following April, and training of dogs began in the U.S. in February 1929.
- A three-story building in Shanghai collapsed during a meeting of female textile workers who were gathering to form a labor union. Reportedly, the women had just elected officers when the third floor collapsed, bringing down the building.
- Alfredo Jauregui, one of several persons convicted of the assassination in 1917 of Bolivian President José Manuel Pando, was executed by firing squad. He had been chosen, by lottery, to serve as lone conspirator to receive the death penalty.
- The Ikhwan Revolt began in Saudi Arabia when a party of Berber tribesmen, the Ikhwan, attacked and killed foreign construction workers and policemen who had been working on a police post in Busaiya.
- Born: Kenneth Waller, English TV actor; in Huddersfield, Yorkshire, (d. 2000)
- Died:
  - Marceline Orbes, 53, who, as "Marceline the Clown", was world-renowned during the late 19th and early 20th century, committed suicide
  - Augusta Déjerine-Klumpke, 68, pioneering neurologist who had been the first woman to become a member of the Societe de Neurologie

== November 6, 1927 (Sunday) ==
- The Italian Army became the first to make a mass drop of paratroopers, as soldiers bailed out of airplanes near Milan, to landing at Cinisello Balsamo.
- Died: David George Hogarth, 65, British archaeologist, scholar, and an associate of T. E. Lawrence

== November 7, 1927 (Monday) ==
- The last anti-government protests (until 1991) in the Soviet Union took place on the tenth anniversary of the Communist victory in Russia, when the annual parade was joined by another group of marchers demonstrating against First Secretary Joseph Stalin. Government police broke up the protests, and Leon Trotsky, Grigory Zinoviev, and Lev Kamenev were condemned for organizing an opposition.
- Pope Pius XI, answering the request of an American Roman Catholic bishop, gave his blessing for marriages performed in airplanes. A spokesman for the Vatican quoted the Pope as saying, "Provided other ecclesiastical formalities are complied with, there is no reason to prohibit these marriages."
- Born: Hiroshi Yamauchi, Japanese entrepreneur who became president of Nintendo, a playing card manufacturing company, and transformed it into a multibillion-dollar creator of video games; in Kyoto (d. 2013)

== November 8, 1927 (Tuesday) ==
- The membership of the Simon Commission, chaired by Sir John Simon to review India's fitness for self-government, was announced, and, as one Indian author would later note, "in an incredible act of racial arrogance the British government had decided that all seven would be whites", on the recommendation of the Viceroy, Lord Irwin. In addition to Simon were Viscount Burnham, Lord Strathcona, Edward Cadogan, Clement Attlee, Vernon Hartshorn and Colonel George Lane-Fox.
- After having been banned from public speaking since his attempted "Beer Hall Putsch", German politician Adolf Hitler was allowed to speak at the Bürgerbräukeller in Munich.
- Born:
  - Patti Page, American singer, known for "Tennessee Waltz" and "(How Much Is) That Doggie in the Window?"; as Clara Ann Fowler in Claremore, Oklahoma (d. 2013)
  - Ken Dodd, English comedian and singer; in Liverpool (d. 2018)
  - Si Newhouse, American publishing magnate, in New York City; (d. 2017)
  - Chris Connor, American jazz singer; as Mary Loutsenhizer in Kansas City, Missouri (d. 2009)
  - Lal Krishna Advani, the last Deputy Prime Minister of India (2002–04) and opposition leader in the Lok Sabha (2004–09); in Karachi, British India

== November 9, 1927 (Wednesday) ==
- An uprising broke out in Lithuania at the city of Tauragė, led by citizens dissatisfied with the regime of President Antanas Smetona. Ultimately, 209 people would be convicted of charges arising from the insurrection, and eleven executed.
- Died: Campbell MacKenzie-Richards, 27, British test pilot for the Royal Air Force, was killed after he and his observer, Harry Norman Green, parachuted out of their airplane as it was running out of gas. Green had bailed out first and landed safely in a field near East Grinstead, Sussex, but MacKenzie-Richards "was killed, his parachute falling like a stone" after he jumped from the aircraft.

== November 10, 1927 (Thursday) ==
- General Motors declared the largest dividend in history up to that time, paying a total of $3.75 per share on each of its 17,400,000 shares for a total of $65,250,000 to its investors. The money paid represented the regular quarterly dividend of $1.25, plus an additional $2.50."
- The gunboat USS Panay and the submarine USS Argonaut were both launched. The Panay would be attacked and sunk by Japanese aircraft on December 12, 1937, slightly less than four years before America's entry into World War II, while the Argonaut would be sunk by the Japanese in 1943.
- Born: Sabah, Lebanese singer and actress; as Jeanette Gergi Feghali in Beirut (d. 2014)

== November 11, 1927 (Friday) ==
- France and Yugoslavia signed a treaty of amity and arbitration. Although it had no military significance, the Franco-Yugoslavian treaty angered the Italian government, which signed a defense treaty with Albania on November 22.
- On Armistice Day, the Canadian Cross of Sacrifice section of Arlington National Cemetery was dedicated as a final resting place for American citizens who had been veterans of the Canadian Army, as U.S. President Calvin Coolidge appeared in a ceremony with honor guards from the U.S. Army and the Canadian Army.
- Born: Mose Allison, American jazz pianist; in Tippo, Mississippi (d. 2016)
- Died: Frances Gardiner Davenport, American historian and expert on treaties

== November 12, 1927 (Saturday) ==
- The Holland Tunnel, running underneath the Hudson River between Jersey City, New Jersey, and Canal Street in Manhattan, was opened at 5:00 pm to the public. Over the next two hours, 20,000 people walked through it before it was opened to traffic at midnight. President Coolidge pressed a button that rang a large brass bell at the entrance. At midnight, pedestrians were permanently barred from the tunnel, and cars began driving through from Jersey City.
- The Mahatma Gandhi made his first and only visit to Ceylon, now Sri Lanka.
- Born: Yutaka Taniyama, Japanese mathematician who postulated the Taniyama–Shimura conjecture ("every elliptic curve defined over the rational field is a factor of the Jacobian of a modular function field"), referred to as the modularity theorem; in Kisai, Saitama Prefecture (committed suicide, 1958)
- Died: Father Margarito Flores García, 28, was executed by a firing squad as part of the anti-clerical persecution of Mexican President Plutarco Calles. Flores would be canonized as a Roman Catholic saint in 2000.

== November 13, 1927 (Sunday) ==
- Mindogon Mgboundoulou, father of 6-year-old Jean-Bédel Bokassa, was beaten to death after releasing persons being detained by the Compagnie Forestière de la Sangha-Oubangi. Bokassa's mother, Marie Yokowo, killed herself a week later. "[I]t would be no exaggeration to say that [Bokassa] learned the art of violence at an early age from some of its most seasoned practitioners", one author would note later. Bokassa would oversee the murder of thousands of his countrymen as leader of the Central African Republic.
- An attempt was made on the life of Mexican presidential candidate, General Álvaro Obregón, by a group of Cristeros, Christian clerics who had been persecuted by the government. Two bombs were thrown at his car, and he was slightly cut by glass from the windshield. Father Miguel Agustín Pro Juárez would later be executed for the crime.

== November 14, 1927 (Monday) ==
- Twenty-six people in Pittsburgh were killed and 465 injured in the explosion of a natural gas storage tank. Operated by the Equitable Gas Company, the five million cubic foot gasometer, located on Reedsdale Street and Sproat Alley on Pittsburgh's North Side, erupted at 8:45 in the morning. The blast collapsed an adjacent factory building onto the 140 employees of the Pittsburgh Clay Pot Company.
- The Central Committee of the Soviet Communist Party voted to expel both Trotsky and Zinoviev from membership, along with 81 of their associates. The resolution became effective on December 2, when the Fifteenth Congress of the CPSU purged 93 other Party members associated with the "Trotsky-Zinoviev faction".
- Born: McLean Stevenson, American TV actor best known as Colonel Blake in M*A*S*H; in Normal, Illinois (d. 1996)

== November 15, 1927 (Tuesday) ==
- Show Boat, with music by Jerome Kern and lyrics by Oscar Hammerstein II and P. G. Wodehouse, was given its first pre-Broadway tryout, at the National Theatre in Washington, D.C. It would open on Broadway on December 27. Because the production ran too long, 90 minutes would be cut. Legend has it that the most famous number in Show Boat, the song "Ol' Man River", was almost removed.
- The most regular outbursting comet, 29P/Schwassmann–Wachmann, was discovered by astronomers Arno Wachmann and Arnold Schwassmann.
- Born: Wallace Rowling, Prime Minister of New Zealand 1974 to 1975; in Motueka (d. 1995)

== November 16, 1927 (Wednesday) ==
- The USS Saratoga, the second United States Navy aircraft carrier, was commissioned. After World War II, the decommissioned Saratoga would be among ships sunk in an atomic test on July 25, 1946.
- Died:
  - Adolph Joffe, 44, Soviet diplomat, committed suicide four days after the expulsion of his ally, Leon Trotsky, from the Communist Party.
  - Theodore "Tiger" Flowers, 32, former middleweight boxing champion, died from complications of minor surgery for a growth above his eye. Four days earlier, he had knocked out Leo Gates in four rounds in a bout in New York.

== November 17, 1927 (Thursday) ==
- President Coolidge declared in a speech to the Union League of Philadelphia that America was "entering upon a new era of prosperity". Less than two years later, the stock market would crash.
- The Mexican Supreme Court voided enforcement of a 1925 law that had abrogated a 1923 agreement between the U.S. and Mexico that had allowed drilling for oil.
- Born: Fenella Fielding, English comedian; in London (d. 2018)
- Died: Moulay Youssef, 45, Sultan of Morocco since 1912, died of uremia. General Mougin, French Director of the Moroccan military, supported Prince Idris, Youssef's eldest son, as the successor, while the Grand Vizier, Mohammed El Mokri, supported Youssef's youngest son, Sidi Mohammed, who won out and was crowned Mohammed V.

== November 18, 1927 (Friday) ==
- U.S. President Coolidge commuted the prison sentence of Black Nationalist leader Marcus Garvey, who had been convicted of defrauding contributors in raising funds for his "Back to Africa" movement. After his release, Garvey, a native of Jamaica, was deported from the U.S. on board the ship SS Saramacca.
- Humphrey Bogart and fellow actor Helen Menken were divorced, 18 months after their May 20, 1926, marriage, after she alleged cruelty and at least two occasions of battery. However, the two re-established their friendship even after Bogart remarried.
- Born: Hank Ballard, American musician and songwriter best known as author of "The Twist", 1990 inductee into the Rock and Roll Hall of Fame; as John Henry Kendricks in Detroit (d. 2003)

== November 19, 1927 (Saturday) ==
- The first Phillips 66 service station was opened, inaugurating the chain of gasoline and auto repair centers at Wichita, Kansas. The very first filling station had been opened in 1907, in Seattle, for Standard Oil Company.
- Fifty years after its founding in Bowling Green, Kentucky, Ogden College signed an agreement with Western State Normal School and Teachers College, closing the college and turning the campus over to what would become Western Kentucky University. The original 20-year lease was extended and will now run until 2059. The college's name survives as the "Ogden College of Science and Engineering" on the WKU campus.
- The Cap Arcona made her maiden voyage, departing Hamburg to Argentina. The German luxury liner would later be the prison for thousands of concentration camp inmates, who would die when that ship and others were bombed by the Royal Air Force on May 3, 1945.

== November 20, 1927 (Sunday) ==
- Forty-five members of the national militia of Liberia were drowned in the sinking of the steamship J. J. Dossen, which was bringing them back to Monrovia after they had participated in a parade in Caldwell.
- Born:
  - Ed W. Freeman, American soldier who was the inspiration for the film We Were Soldiers; in Neely, Mississippi. Freeman would wait 36 years to receive the Medal of Honor for his heroism in the Vietnam War on November 14, 1965. (d. 2008)
  - Mikhail Ulyanov, Soviet Russian film actor and director; in Omsk (d. 2007)
- Died: John Stillwell Stark, 86, American music publisher who popularized ragtime music.

== November 21, 1927 (Monday) ==
- The Colorado state police opened fire with machine guns on 500 unarmed coal miners at the Columbine Mine Rocky Mountain Fuel Company in Lafayette, Colorado, during a strike, killing five of them. The incident was referred to as the "Columbine Massacre" prior to the 1999 high school shooting in Littleton, Colorado.
- The Soviet government passed a proposal by Joseph Stalin to make it a capital crime to leave the U.S.S.R. and to refuse to return. In addition to the confiscation of a violator's property, a person convicted of "placing oneself outside the law" of the U.S.S.R. was subject to execution "24 hours after confirmation of his identity". The law was used to carry out assassinations of anyone harmful to the regime, no matter where they lived.
- Actress Edith Luckett Robbins filed a petition for divorce against her husband, Kenneth Robbins, for desertion. The divorce was granted by a court in Trenton, New Jersey, in February. Edith then married Dr. Loyal Davis, who adopted her daughter, Ann Frances Robbins, who would take on the name Nancy Davis, later Nancy Reagan.
- Born::
  - Georgia Frontiere, majority owner of the NFL's St. Louis Rams, who moved the team to her hometown from Los Angeles in 1995; as Violet Frances Irwin in St. Louis (d. 2008)
  - Joseph Campanella, American stage and TV actor, known for soap operas; in Lewistown, Pennsylvania (d. 2018)

== November 22, 1927 (Tuesday) ==
- Italy and Albania signed a mutual defense treaty, popularly called the Second Pact of Tirana, which "gave Italy de facto control over Albania as a protectorate". Italy would conquer the Balkan nation in 1939, installing its monarch as King Viktor Emanueli.
- Detroit's National Hockey League team played its first game in Detroit, and its first home game in the United States, after spending its first year playing across the border in Windsor, Ontario. The Detroit Cougars defeated the Ottawa Senators, and after changing their name to the Falcons, would become the Detroit Red Wings in 1932.
- The Alvin Theater opened on Broadway, with George Gershwin's musical Funny Face as its first presentation. The name was not based on anyone named Alvin, but was an amalgam of the names of producers Alex Aarons and Vinton Freedley.
- Died: St. Pedro Esqueda Ramirez, 40, one of the Cristeros martyrs who was executed by the Mexican government.

== November 23, 1927 (Wednesday) ==
- U.S. Army pilot Rusty Rowell located the secret mountain base of El Chipote, used by Sandinista rebels for raids against the Nicaraguan National Guard, and American troops occupying Nicaragua.
- Born: Cardinal Angelo Sodano, Secretary of State of the Vatican from 1990 to 2006; in Isola d'Asti. He was the highest ranking Vatican officer from April 2 to April 19, 2005, between the death of Pope John Paul II and the consecration of Pope Benedict XVI (d 2022).
- Died:
  - Miguel Agustín Pro, 36, Mexican Jesuit priest who became one of the most famous of 20th Century Catholic martyrs upon his execution on charges of conspiracy
  - Stanisław Przybyszewski, 59, Polish dramatist.

== November 24, 1927 (Thursday) ==
- The fourth annual Macy's Thanksgiving Day Parade in New York City included a new feature — a large balloon of a popular cartoon character — that would become a tradition in the parades from 1933 onward. The first balloon, designed and constructed by Tony Sarg, was an image of Felix the Cat. It was about 15 feet (4.6 m) tall, was filled with air rather than helium, and was displayed on the back of a truck. Newspaper accounts at the time noted the day before the parade that Sarg, "renowned for his humorous and fantastic creations for children" would have an "animated puppet show which will appear on one of the nine floats in the pageant" without mention of the animation, in addition to "an enormous smoke-breathing dinosaur, sixty feet in length, attended by a bodyguard of prehistoric cavemen", and a "spectacular Robinson Crusoe-Desert Island float" preceded by "an entire forest", "lions, tigers, monkeys, giraffes and occasional cannibals" and the feature that "For the first time in the history of Broadway, trees will actually move along the street."
- Construction worker Philo Anderson of Beaver, Utah, became entangled in rope while lowering a section of pipe on the North Rim of the Grand Canyon. He fell 300 feet (91 m) to his death.
- On Thanksgiving Day at California's Folsom Prison, the maximum security inmates were watching a holiday program at the cell house, when the group overwhelmed the eight guards and attempted an escape. As luck would have it, the assistant turnkey had transferred the keys to the prison to another employee shortly before the outbreak. Two guards and seven prisoners died in a riot that involved one-third of the 1,200 inmates, before 300 members of the California National Guard arrived to assist 200 civil officers, bringing with them tanks and machine guns. The group released their hostages unharmed upon surrendering the next morning.
- Born:
  - Ahmadou Kourouma, Ivory Coast novelist; in Boundiali (d. 2003)
  - Emma Lou Diemer, American composer; in Kansas City, Missouri (d. 2024)
  - Alfredo Kraus, Spanish tenor; in Las Palmas, the Canary Islands (d. 1999)
- Died:
  - Ion I. C. Brătianu, 63, Prime Minister of Romania on five occasions since 1909
  - William H. G. Bullard, 60, U.S. Navy Admiral, radio engineer, and first chairman of the Federal Radio Commission (forerunner of the FCC)
  - Shushanik Kurghinian, 51, Armenian feminist writer and poet

== November 25, 1927 (Friday) ==
- The Special Tribunal for the Defense of the State was created by the Fascist government of Benito Mussolini.
- The International Radio-Telegraphy Convention was signed in Washington by representatives of 51 nations, and took effect on January 1, 1929.
- Yehudi Menuhin, an 11-year-old violinist, made his concert debut in New York City.
- Born: Dick Wellstood, American jazz pianist; in Greenwich, Connecticut (d. 1987)

== November 26, 1927 (Saturday) ==
- In the most anticipated game of the 1927 college football season, a crowd of 123,000 turned out at Soldier Field in Chicago to watch Notre Dame (6–1–1) play against the USC (7–0–1). Notre Dame won 7–6, on the strength of a blocked extra point attempt, to hand the Trojans their first loss.
- Maria Kutschera, a 22-year-old tutor, married her widowed employer, former Austro-Hungarian Navy Captain Georg von Trapp, and became stepmother to his seven children. Together, they formed the Trapp Family Singers, and their story became the inspiration for the Broadway musical, and later the film, The Sound of Music.

== November 27, 1927 (Sunday) ==
- China's first professional music educational institution, the National College of Music, was created. Based in Shanghai, the school had Cai Yuanpei as its first president, and Xiao Youmei as its first dean of studies. Under the Communist regime, the college received its current name as the Shanghai Conservatory of Music.
- Born:
  - William E. Simon, U.S. Secretary of the Treasury, 1974 to 1977; in Paterson, New Jersey (d. 2000)
  - Arnold Clark, Scottish automobile dealer who started from his Glasgow used car lot and built Arnold Clark Automobiles, a chain of 200 dealerships across the United Kingdom; in Glasgow (d. 2017)

== November 28, 1927 (Monday) ==
- The Pittsburgh Pirates traded Kiki Cuyler to the Chicago Cubs for Sparky Adams and Pete Scott. Although the Pirates made the deal to get rid of Cuyler due to his clashes with management and ownership, this is remembered as one of the worst trades in Pirates history since Adams and Scott were gone from the team within two years, while Cuyler had six more seasons in which he hit over .300 on his way to enshrinement in the Baseball Hall of Fame.
- The musical revue Harry Delmar's Revels premiered at the Shubert Theatre on Broadway.
- Born:
  - Abdul Halim of Kedah, constitutional monarch (Yang di-Pertuan Agong) of Malaysia from 2011 to 2016, and Sultan of Kedah since 1958; in Anak Bukit (d. 2017)
  - Chuck Mitchell, American actor known for portraying "Porky" Wallace in the films Porky's and Porky's Revenge!; in Connecticut (d. 1992)

== November 29, 1927 (Tuesday) ==
- Amānullāh Khān, King of Afghanistan, became the first Afghan monarch to depart his kingdom to travel abroad. His tour of Europe lasted until his return on June 1, 1928.
- Born: Vin Scully, American baseball broadcaster known as "The Voice of the Dodgers"; in the Bronx (d. 2022)

== November 30, 1927 (Wednesday) ==
- The Soviet Union's proposal for a General and Complete Disarmament" presented by the Soviet delegation to the League of Nations.
- Born: Robert Guillaume, American TV actor who played the title role in Benson, and who appeared in the film The Lion King as the voice of the wise mandrill, Rafiki; as Robert P. Williams, in St. Louis (d. 2017)
