= December 1927 =

Month of 1927

<<	December 1927					>>
Su	Mo	Tu	We	Th	Fr	Sa
				1	2	3
4	5	6	7	8	9	10
11	12	13	14	15	16	17
18	19	20	21	22	23	24
25	26	27	28	29	30	31

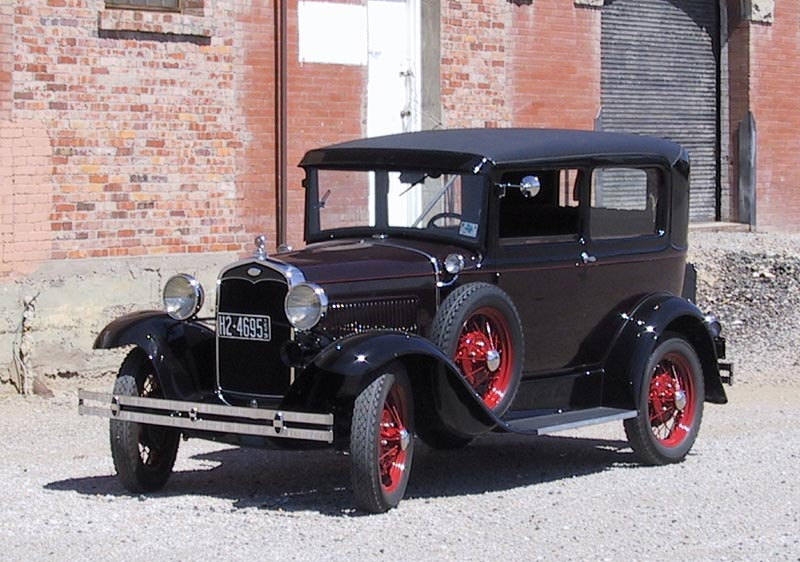
December 2, 1927: The Model A arrives

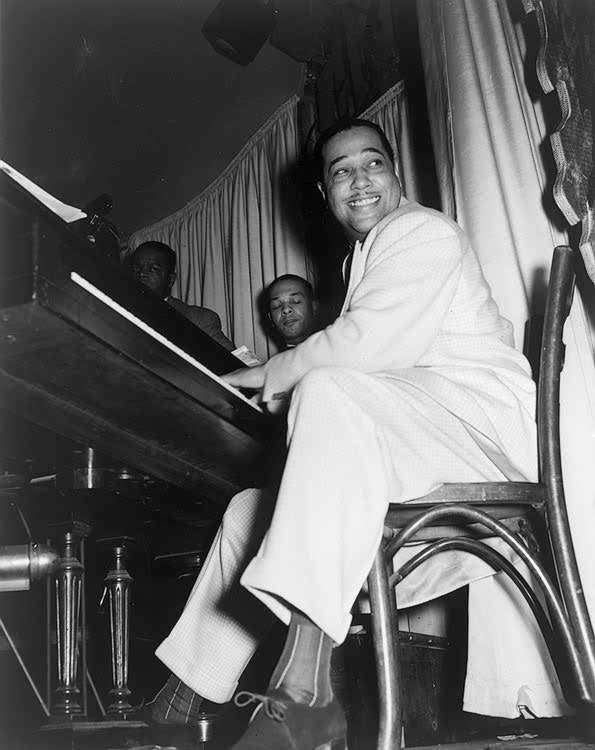
December 4, 1927: Duke Ellington and his Orchestra debut at The Cotton Club in Harlem

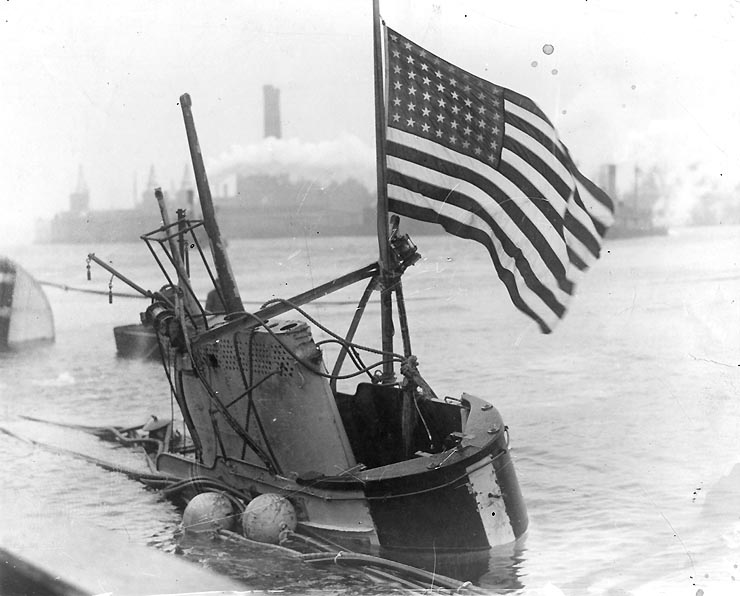
December 17, 1927: U.S. Navy submarine S-4 sinks, 34 drown

The following events occurred in December 1927:

== December 1, 1927 (Thursday) ==
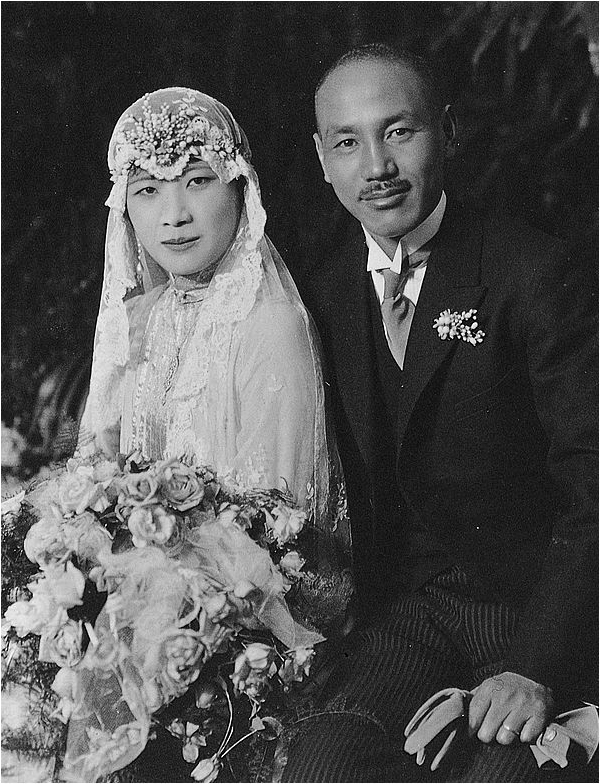
Soong-Chiang wedding

- Chinese actress Soong Mei-ling married General Chiang Kai-shek, and became known as Madame Chiang Kai-shek. After General Chiang became China's leader the following year, she was the First Lady for the next 48 years, until her husband's death in 1975. An Episcopal Christian wedding was conducted, in English, at Miss Soong's home, followed by a Chinese civil ceremony at the Majestic Hotel in Shanghai. Miss Soong's sister was the widow of China's first President, Sun Yat-sen.

== December 2, 1927 (Friday) ==
- Following 19 years of Ford Model T production, the Ford Motor Company unveiled the Model A as its new automobile.
- France's Chamber of Deputies rejected a proposal to abolish the death penalty, by a margin of 376–145. France would finally abolish the death penalty on October 9, 1981.
- Marcus Garvey was deported from the United States, placed on the SS Saramacca at New Orleans and returned to his native Jamaica.

== December 3, 1927 (Saturday) ==
- The first film of the Laurel and Hardy series of Hal Roach comedies was released. Stan Laurel and Oliver Hardy had appeared in the same films as early as 1918, but had not become a star team until October. The first "official" Laurel & Hardy film was a two-reel silent, Putting Pants on Philip.
- The mystery film London After Midnight starring Lon Chaney was released. Today it is one of the most famous lost films.
- Born: Andy Williams, American singer, as Howard Andrew Williams in Wall Lake, Iowa (d. 2012)

== December 4, 1927 (Sunday) ==
- Duke Ellington and his orchestra opened at the Cotton Club in Harlem. Ellington proved so popular that he was featured at the Cotton Club for five years. In 1929, the CBS Radio Network began broadcasting a live show from the club, taking the 28-year-old jazz musician on his way to worldwide fame.

== December 5, 1927 (Monday) ==
- The Illini of the University of Illinois were awarded the Rissler Cup after finishing first in the Dickinson System ratings for college football teams, under a formula devised by a University of Illinois economics professor, Frank G. Dickenson. The Illini had a 7–0–1 record; second place was held by the University of Pittsburgh Panthers (8–0–1). For the nation's only bowl game, the Rose Bowl, Pitt was selected to play (7–2–1) Stanford University, whose teams were known at that time as the "Indians".
- Born:
  - Bhumibol Adulyadej, who reigned as Rama IX, King of Thailand from 1946 to 2016, in Cambridge, Massachusetts (d. 2016)
  - W.D. Amaradeva, Sri Lankan singer and composer, in Moratuwa (d. 2016)
  - Oscar Miguez, Uruguayan footballer who helped that nation win the 1950 World Cup (d. 2006)

== December 6, 1927 (Tuesday) ==
- On the day that they were scheduled to testify at a murder trial in Williamson, West Virginia, six witnesses were killed when the lodging they were staying in caught fire. Flames blocked both stairways leading from the upper floor, and all of the victims were found in a room where they had fled to escape the smoke.
- Colonel Juan Aberle and Major Alfaro Noguera attempted to stage a coup in El Salvador. They took control of the central police barracks in San Salvador, but the badly planned putsch was quickly suppressed.
- Born: Patsy Takemoto Mink, who in 1964 became the first female Asian-American to be elected to Congress; in Paia, Hawaii (d. 2002)

== December 7, 1927 (Wednesday) ==
- The 250 foot long Canadian freighter SS Kamloops, with a crew of 22, sank in Lake Superior during a winter storm. Bodies of some victims were recovered in the spring, but the ship would remain missing for almost 50 years until August 21, 1977, its discovery by two scuba divers near Isle Royale.
- Born: Helen Watts, Welsh contralto, in Milford Haven (d. 2009)

== December 8, 1927 (Thursday) ==
- The Brookings Institution, one of the earliest political and economic research institutes, was created by the merger of three organizations that had been created by philanthropist Robert S. Brookings: the Institute for Government Research, the Institute of Economics, and the Robert Brookings Graduate School.
- Born:
  - Vladimir Shatalov, Soviet cosmonaut on Soyuz 4, Soyuz 8 and Soyuz 10; in Petropavlosk, Kazakh SSR (d. 2021)
  - Niklas Luhmann, German social theorist, in Lüneburg (d. 1998)
  - Parkash Singh Badal, Indian politician who was Chief Minister of Punjab on four occasions between 1970 and 2017; in Abul Khurana, Punjab Province, British India(d. 2023)

== December 9, 1927 (Friday) ==
- The Washington Herald, owned by William Randolph Hearst, published a front-page story alleging that Mexico's President Plutarco Calles had proposed bribing four United States Senators to advance Mexico's interests. Days later, Hearst provided documentation revealing the names of the four Senators: William Borah (R-Idaho), J. Thomas Heflin (D-Alabama), Robert M. La Follette, Jr. (R-Wisconsin) and George W. Norris (R-Nebraska), who all denied any payment from Mexico, while the Mexican government questioned the authenticity of the documents possessed by the Herald.
- Born: Pierre Henry, French electronic music composer, in Paris (d. 2017)
- Died: Dr. Paul Jeserich, 73, celebrated as "The German Sherlock Holmes" because of his skills as a forensic detective.

== December 10, 1927 (Saturday) ==
- The WSM Barn Dance, the popular NBC Radio Network show, announced its change of name and would create a brand that is now part of its show that is still running a century after its 1925 premiere. That weekend's broadcast happened minutes after the presentation of the Grand Opera on NBC's Music Appreciation Hour, and before introducing the first act (African-American singer DeFord Bailey) at the WSM studio in Nashville, WSM director George D. Hay told audiences that "For the past hour, we have been listening to music largely from grand opera, but from now on, we will present 'The Grand Ole Opry'."
- The U.S. House of Representatives voted to confer the Medal of Honor upon Colonel Charles Lindbergh.

== December 11, 1927 (Sunday) ==
- At 4:00 am, the Chinese city of Canton (now Guangzhou) was seized in an uprising of 20,000 Communists, who announced that the formation of the "Canton Soviet". The Red Guards and their sympathizers seized control of police stations and the city prison, murdering police and guards, seizing control of the arsenal, and releasing prisoners. The Nationalist Army retook the city two days later, and carried out an even bloodier retaliation. At least 2,000 members of the Red Guards, whose dyed scarves had left a red stain on their collars, were arrested and summarily executed, while another 4,000 civilians were murdered in the five-day-long "White Terror" carried out by the Nationalist Troops.

== December 12, 1927 (Monday) ==
- Oklahoma's Governor Henry S. Johnston, threatened with impeachment by the state legislature, called out the Oklahoma National Guard to prevent members of the state House of Representatives from meeting at the capitol building. The next day, house members met at the Huckins Hotel in Oklahoma City hotel and voted to impeach Governor Johnston, state Supreme Court Chief Justice Fred P. Branson, and State Board of Agriculture chairman Henry B. Cordell. An injunction was issued against the Senators to prevent them from attempting to conduct an impeachment trial. On December 28, the guardsmen barred members of the state Senate from meeting at the capitol building.
- The National Builders Bank, located in Chicago, opened the first branch that would operate 24/7, with shifts to "render twenty-four hour service 365 days a year".
- Tommy Loughran defeated world light heavyweight boxing champion Jimmy Slattery in a 15-round decision at New York's Madison Square Garden.
- Born: Robert Noyce, co-inventor of the microchip and co-founder of Fairchild Semiconductor and Intel; in Burlington, Iowa (d. 1990)

== December 13, 1927 (Tuesday) ==
- Charles Lindbergh made a daring non-stop flight from Washington DC, bound for Mexico City. He landed more than 24 hours later after going through bad weather. Reputedly, after getting lost, he flew in low enough to spot the word "Caballeros" at one railroad station and could not find it on his map, before learning later that it was the word for "Gentlemen" on a men's bathroom.
- Born: James Wright, American poet, in Martins Ferry, Ohio (d. 1980)

== December 14, 1927 (Wednesday) ==
- The United Kingdom and the Kingdom of Iraq signed a Treaty of Alliance and Amity.
- The aircraft carrier USS Lexington, recently converted from a battle cruiser, was commissioned. The ship would be damaged beyond repair in 1942 during the Battle of the Coral Sea.
- The British House of Lords approved the Archbishop of Canterbury's request for approval of a revision to the Book of Common Prayer, 241–88.

== December 15, 1927 (Thursday) ==
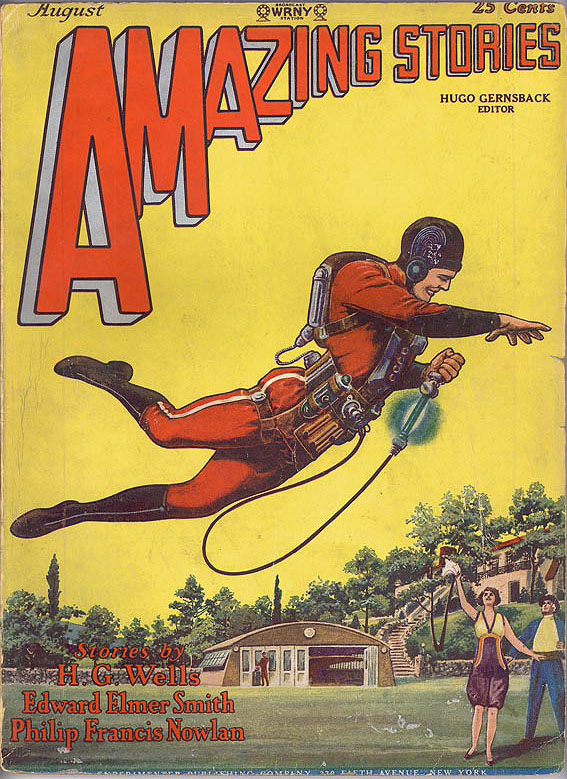
December 15, 1927: Buck Rogers entombed until 2419 A.D.

- Marion Parker, 12, was kidnapped from Mount Vernon Junior High School in Los Angeles. Her dismembered body was dumped from the kidnapper's car two days later, after her father paid a $1,500 ransom. Following the largest manhunt to that time on the West Coast, her killer, William Edward Hickman, was arrested on December 22 at the town of Echo, Oregon. He would be hanged on October 19, 1928.
- The British House of Commons rejected the proposed revision of the Anglican Book of Common Prayer, by a vote of 247–205.
- In fiction, Anthony "Buck" Rogers, of the American Radioactive Gas Corporation, was entombed by a rockfall in an abandoned coal mine in Pennsylvania. Kept in a state of suspended animation by the radioactive gas, he would be revived 492 years later, in the year 2419 and go on to further adventures. Buck Rogers was introduced in Philip Francis Nowlan's science fiction novella, Armageddon 2419 A.D. in the August 1928 issue of Amazing Stories.

== December 16, 1927 (Friday) ==
- Pope Pius XI instructed his Cardinal Secretary of State, Pietro Gasparri, to cease further discussions with the Soviet Union, based on the increase there of religious persecution. Relations would be reopened by Nikita Khrushchev in November 1961.
- General Edwin B. Winans, superintendent of the U.S. Military Academy at West Point, announced that the annual Army–Navy Game of college football would not be played in future seasons, after contract negotiations with the U.S. Naval Academy fell through. The popular game was renewed in 1930.
- Died: Benjamin Purnell, 66, founder and self-styled "King" of the House of David colony at Benton Harbor, Michigan.

== December 17, 1927 (Saturday) ==
- The U.S. Navy submarine S-4 was accidentally rammed by the United States Coast Guard destroyer Paulding off of the coast of Provincetown, Massachusetts, tearing the hull. The sub sank immediately, drowning 34 of the 40 men on board. Six men in the forward torpedo room survived and communicated with divers by tapping in Morse code on the sub's hull, but severe weather delayed the rescue and the trapped survivors died after three days.
- Dietrich Bonhoeffer presented and defended his doctoral dissertation, the groundbreaking Sanctorum Communio, at the University of Berlin, beginning a career in the defense of the Christian faith against the German government.
- Australian cricketer Bill Ponsford made 437 runs to break his own world record for the highest first-class cricket score at Melbourne Cricket Ground.
- Died:
  - Hubert Harrison, 44, African American writer, critic, and activist, died following complications from an appendectomy.
  - Rajendra Nath Lahiri, 26, Indian revolutionary associated with the Hindustan Republican Association, was hanged by British Indian authorities after being convicted for his role in the 1925 train robbery at Kakori.

== December 18, 1927 (Sunday) ==
- The Fifteenth Congress of the Soviet Communist Party voted its approval of the expulsion of Leon Trotsky, Grigory Zinoviev, and 98 other opponents of Party First Secretary Joseph Stalin.
- Born:
  - Roméo LeBlanc, 25th Governor General of Canada (1995–1999); in Memramcook, New Brunswick (d. 2009)
  - Ramsey Clark, U.S. Attorney General (1967–69) and later a controversial left-wing activist, in Dallas (d. 2021)
  - Marilyn Sachs, prolific American children's author, in New York City (d. 2016)

== December 19, 1927 (Monday) ==
- The Dow Jones Industrial Average broke 200 points for the first time. By the end of 1928, it would reflect a 50% increase in stock prices, rising to 300, peaking at 386.10 on September 3, 1929. A month later, the stock market would crash. At its lowest point during the Great Depression, it would close at 41.22 on July 8, 1932.
- For the first time in the history of Vatican City, there were as many non-Italians as there were Italians in the College of Cardinals, as Pope Pius XI appointed five men to fill vacancies in the 66 member College. Two were from France, and one apiece from Canada, Spain and Hungary.
- Indian revolutionaries (Pandit Ram Prasad Bismil, Thakur Roshan Singh and Ashfaqulla Khan) were executed by the British Indian government for their roles in the 1925 train robbery at Kakori. Rajendra Nath Lahiri had been executed two days earlier. All four men, members of the anti-British Hindustan Republican Association were hanged at the Gorkakhpur District Jail.

== December 20, 1927 (Tuesday) ==
- The closely watched murder trial of lawyer-turned-bootlegger, George Remus, ended with a finding that he was not guilty by reason of insanity. Remus had shot and killed his wife in October as she was on her way to divorce court. The jury in Cincinnati deliberated 19 minutes before acquitting him.
- Seven miners were killed in the explosion of a coal mine at Stiritz, Illinois.
- Born:
  - Kim Young-sam, 14th President of South Korea and the first civilian to serve in that job (1993–1998); in Geoje (d. 2015)
  - Charlie Callas, American comedian; in Brooklyn (d. 2011)
  - Dean Burch, American lawyer politician who chaired the Federal Communications Commission, 1969-1974 and the Republican National Committee, 1964–1965; in Enid, Oklahoma (d. 1991)
  - David Markson, American novelist; in New York City (d. 2010)

== December 21, 1927 (Wednesday) ==
- The trademark and logo for Playskool, manufacturer of educational toys, was registered.
- The Ethnological Missionary Museum was inaugurated at the Vatican at the Lateran Palace.

== December 22, 1927 (Thursday) ==
- The United States and Nicaragua signed an agreement for the 1,229-member Nicaraguan Guardia Nacional to be the sole military and police force, in return for U.S. training and sponsorship.
- After three weeks of display to the public, mass production of the Model A automobile and its shipment to dealers began.

== December 23, 1927 (Friday) ==
- The annual caddy championship at the Glen Garden Country Club in Fort Worth, Texas, pitted two future golf legends against each other. Both were 15 years old. Byron Nelson defeated Ben Hogan by one stroke.
- Frances Wilson and three men set off in her airplane, the Dawn, in a quest for her to become the first woman to fly across the Atlantic Ocean. The airplane disappeared over Newfoundland, and was never found.
- In what became known as the Santa Claus Bank Robbery, three ex-convicts and another man robbed the First National Bank of Cisco, Texas, of $12,400, killing the town's police chief and a deputy
- Born:
  - Stanley Wolpert, American anthropologist and expert on the cultures of the Indian subcontinent; in Brooklyn (d. 2019)
  - Joaquin Capilla, Mexican diver and 1956 Olympic gold medalist; in Mexico City (d. 2010)

== December 24, 1927 (Saturday) ==
- The first All-India Music Conference was held in conjunction with a meeting of the Indian National Congress in Madras.
- Born: Mary Higgins Clark, American suspense author, in the Bronx, New York (d. 2020)

== December 25, 1927 (Sunday) ==
- A copy of the Manusmriti, the Hindu holy book that established the rules for the caste system in India, was burned in public at Mahad, was burned by Dr. B. R. Ambedkar, leader of the Dalit caste, commonly called the "Untouchables".
- Police officers of South Pittsburg, Tennessee, fought a gun battle with the Marion County, Tennessee Sheriff and his deputies on the streets of the town on Christmas night. Sheriff Wash Coppinger, City Marshal Ewing Smith, former City Marshal Ben Parker, deputy sheriff L.A. Hennessey, and city policeman O.H. Larrowe died at the scene, and city deputy marshal James Conner was seriously wounded.
- Born:
  - Nellie Fox (Jacob Nelson Fox), American baseball player, in St. Thomas Township, Pennsylvania, as Jacob Nelson Fox; member, Baseball Hall of Fame (d. 1975)
  - Ram Narayan, Indian musician who popularized the string instrument sarangi; in Udaipur (d. 2024)
- Died: Sergey Sazonov, 67, former Foreign Minister of the Russian Empire (1910–1916)

== December 26, 1927 (Monday) ==
- Belgian science fiction author J.-H. Rosny indirectly coined the word "astronaut" at a meeting of the Société astronomique de France (French Astronomical Society) to establish an annual award for outstanding work in promoting human spaceflight. Asked to suggest a descriptive word for space travel, Rosny proposed l'astronautique, using the Greek root words for navigation of the stars.
- The Hominy Indians, an all-Indian football team, upset the New York Giants 13–6 in an exhibition game.
- The emerging religion of Caodaism was outlawed by a royal ordinance of the King of Cambodia.
- The oldest soccer football club in Saudi Arabia, Al-Ittihad (نادي الاتحاد العربي السعودي) of Jeddah, began play.
- Born:
  - Alan King, American comedian; as Irwin Alan Kniberg in New York City (d. 2004)
  - Akihiko Hirata, Japanese film actor, in Keijo, Chosen, Japanese Empire (now Seoul, South Korea) (d. 1984)
  - Denis Quilley, British actor, in London (d. 2003);

== December 27, 1927 (Tuesday) ==
- Jerome Kern and Oscar Hammerstein II's musical play Show Boat, based on Edna Ferber's novel, produced by Florenz Ziegfeld; opened on Broadway and went on to become the first great classic of the American musical theatre. It ran for 572 performances, closing on May 4, 1929.
- The comedy-drama film Chicago based on the play of the same name and starring Phyllis Haver, Julia Faye and Victor Varconi was released.
- Born:
  - George Streisinger, Hungarian-born American molecular biologist who became the first person to clone a vertebrate animal; in Budapest (d. 1984)
  - Anne Armstrong, the first woman to serve as Counselor to the President, in New Orleans (d. 2008)
  - Bill Crow, American jazz musician, in Othello, Washington

== December 28, 1927 (Wednesday) ==
- U.S. Secretary of State Frank B. Kellogg informed the French Ambassador to the U.S., Paul Claudel, that his government proposed to extend American-French negotiations to create a multinational treaty to forever outlaw war, with the goal of having nations "renounce war as an instrument of national policy". Sixty four nations signed the Kellogg-Briand Peace Pact on August 27, 1928, pledging to never again go to war, and the Pact took effect on July 24, 1929.
- At the age of 30, Dorothy Day, who would become founder of the Catholic Worker Movement, converted to Roman Catholicism.

== December 29, 1927 (Thursday) ==
- The eruption of the Perboewatan and Danan undersea volcanoes, near Krakatoa, created the foundation for the Anak Krakatau Island.
- Born: Andy Stanfield, American sprinter; Olympic gold medalist, 1952; in Washington, D.C. (d. 1985)
- Died: Hakim Ajmal Khan, 64, activist for Muslim rights in British India

== December 30, 1927 (Friday) ==
- The first Japanese metro line, the Ginza Line in Tokyo, opened.
- Henry Ford's antisemitic newspaper, the Dearborn Independent, published its final issue.
- The Bellanca Aircraft Company was founded.

== December 31, 1927 (Saturday) ==
- After more than seventy years, the first edition of the Oxford English Dictionary, with 20 volumes, was declared finished. First proposed in 1857, the project was to use volunteers and to include every word in the English language, the definition, the word's origin and first known usage of each word and its later meanings.
- Victor Roos sold all of his stock in the Cessna-Roos Aircraft Company, and the corporation (and the small airplanes that it manufactured) was renamed Cessna Aircraft Company.
- In Shanghai, at midnight at the end of 1927 the clocks were ordered turned back five minutes and 52 seconds. Therefore, on January 1, 1928, at 00:00:00 hours precisely the clocks went back to 23:54:08.
- Born:
  - Swami Vishnu-devananda, Indian Yogi, in Kanimangalam, Kerala State (d. 1993)
  - Nancy Hanks, Chairman of the National Endowment for the Arts from 1969 to 1977, in Miami Beach, Florida (d. 1983)
