= October 1927 =

Month of 1927

<<	October 1927					>>
Su	Mo	Tu	We	Th	Fr	Sa
						1
2	3	4	5	6	7	8
9	10	11	12	13	14	15
16	17	18	19	20	21	22
23	24	25	26	27	28	29
30	31

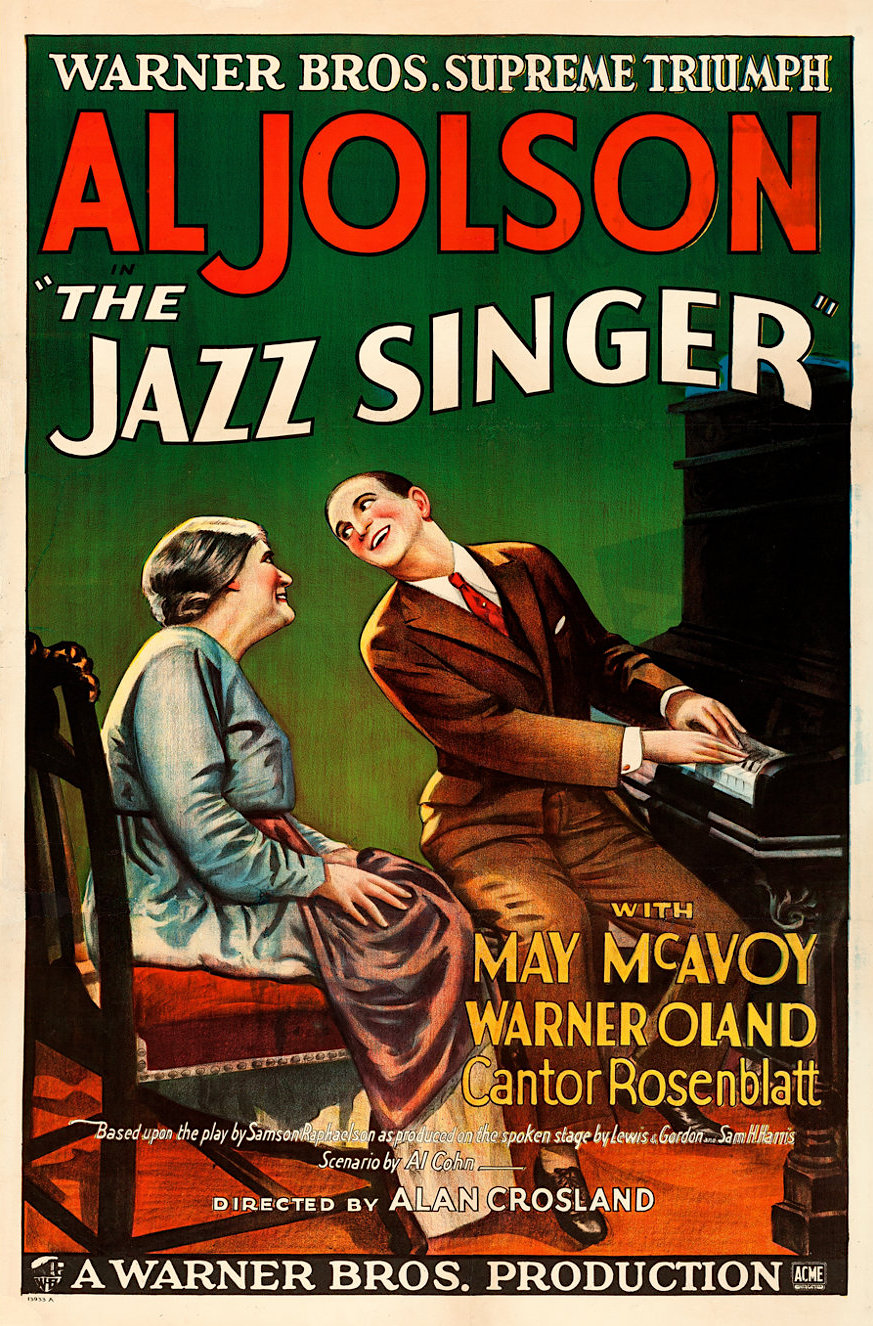
October 6, 1927: The Jazz Singer brings voices to screen

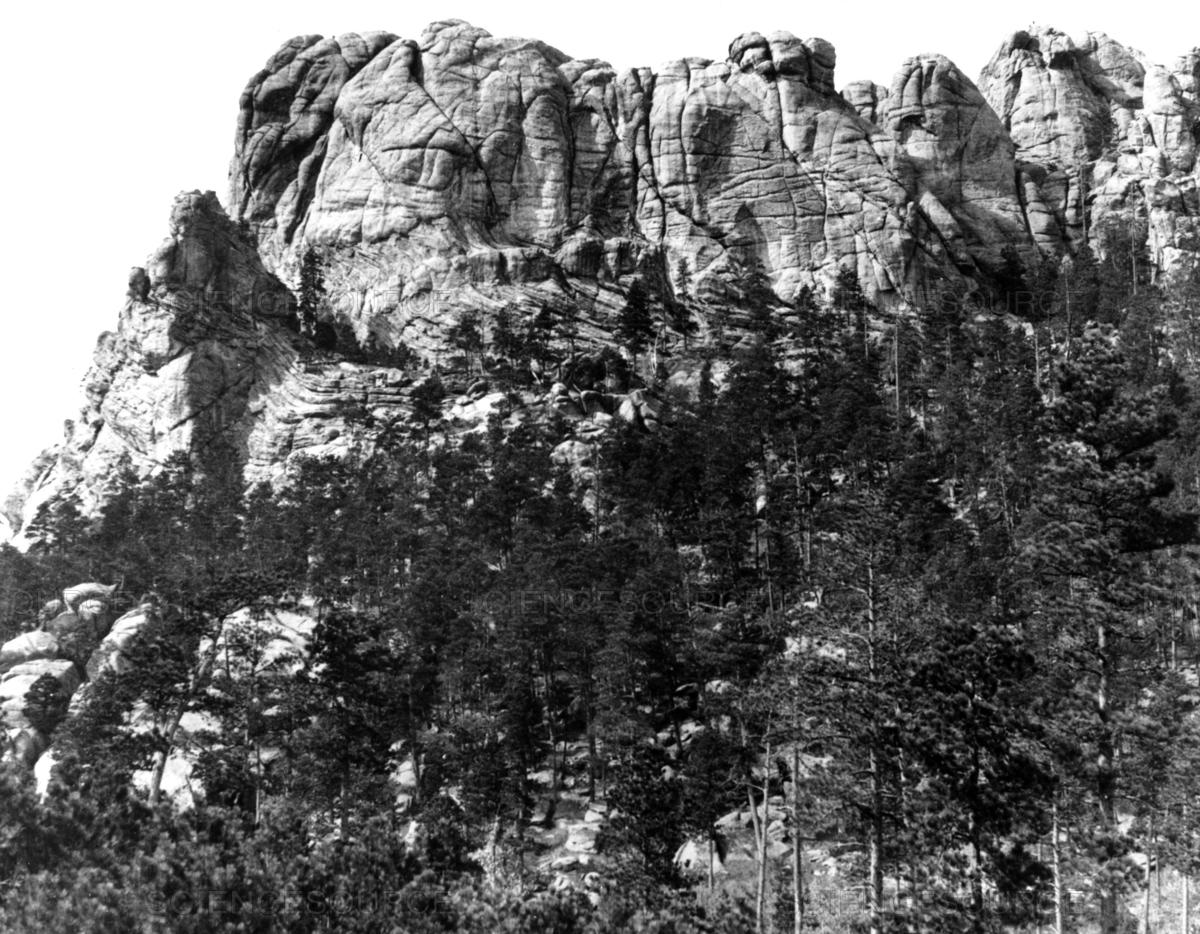
October 4, 1927: Work begins on proposed carving of Mount Rushmore in South Dakota

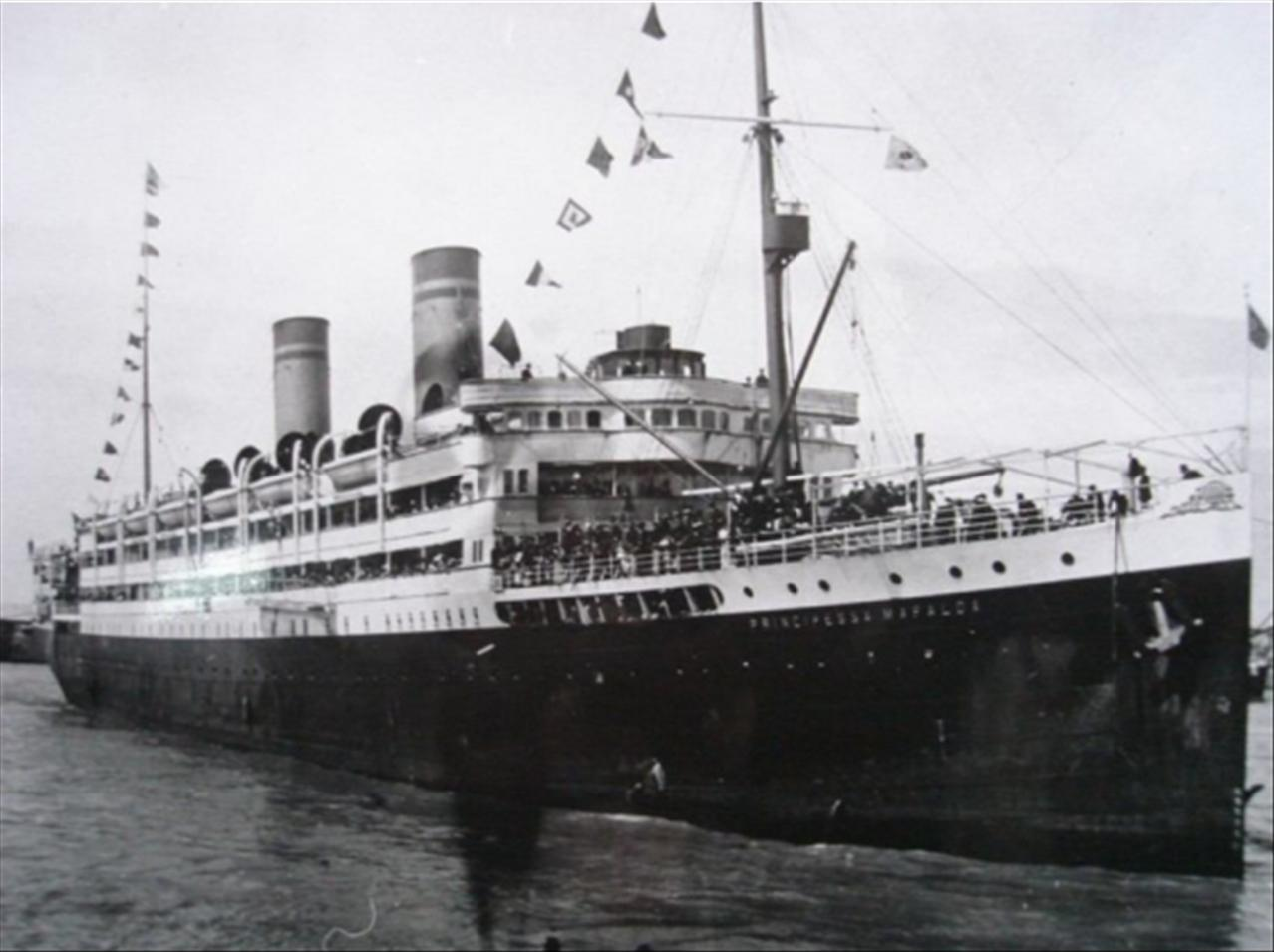
October 25, 1927: 293 die when the Principessa Mafalda sinks

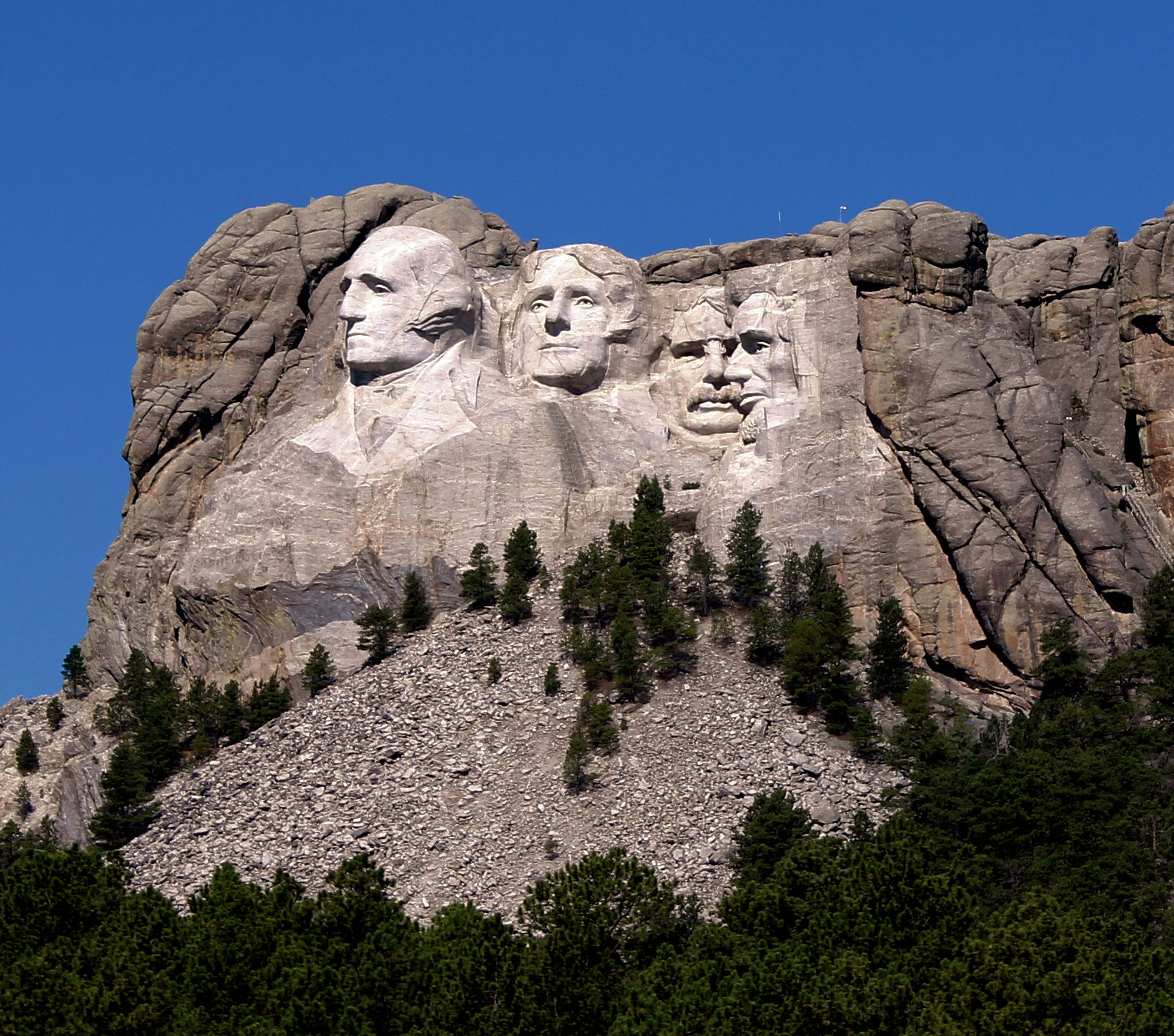
The same mountain after 1934 completion

The following events occurred in October 1927:

== October 1, 1927 (Saturday) ==
- Carl Laemmle, President of Universal Studios, made news by transmitting a contract to New York and to London by "photoradio" over a six-hour period, using an early form of the fax machine.
- The Pittsburgh Pirates clinched the National League pennant with a 9–6 victory over the Cincinnati Reds.
- Michigan Stadium, with a capacity of 84,401 seats, opened with the University of Michigan beating Ohio Wesleyan, 33–0.
- Born: Tom Bosley, American TV comedian actor known for Happy Days and The Father Dowling Mysteries; in Chicago (d. 2010)

== October 2, 1927 (Sunday) ==
- Presbyterian minister Harry Emerson Fosdick delivered the first nationally-broadcast sermon, as NBC Radio began broadcasting the show National Vespers at 5:30 pm Eastern time. Fosdick continued to preach on the radio until 1946.
- Born: F. I. Karpelevich, Soviet mathematician for whom the Gindikin–Karpelevich formula is named; in Moscow (d. 2000);
- Died:
  - Svante Arrhenius, 68, Swedish chemist who won the Nobel Prize in Chemistry in 1903 for his discovery of the greenhouse effect, outlined in his paper "On the Influence of Carbonic Acid in the Air upon the Temperature of the Ground".
  - Austin Peay, 51, Governor of Tennessee since 1922, died of a cerebral hemorrhage following surgery. Austin Peay State University was named in his honor in 1929.

== October 3, 1927 (Monday) ==
- After General Francisco Serrano announced that he would run against former Mexican President Álvaro Obregón in the 1928 election, President Plutarco Elías Calles ordered Serrano's elimination. General Serrano and 12 of his men were intercepted on the road between Cuernavaca and Mexico City and arrested. After General Claudio Fox arrived, the 13 detainees were executed, on the spot, by the Mexican Army. Obregon's other rival, General Arnulfo Gomez, would be executed the next month. With no competitors, Obregon won the election, only to be assassinated two weeks afterward.

== October 4, 1927 (Tuesday) ==
- Carving began on Mount Rushmore, starting with the head of George Washington, as workers began the blasting of granite until a thin layer remained. The likeness of Washington would be ready for dedication on July 4, 1934.
- The International Social Security Association was founded in Geneva.
- Margaret Bevan was elected as the first woman mayor in Great Britain, becoming Lord Mayor of Liverpool.
- Died: John William Boone, 63, blind African-American concert pianist

== October 5, 1927 (Wednesday) ==
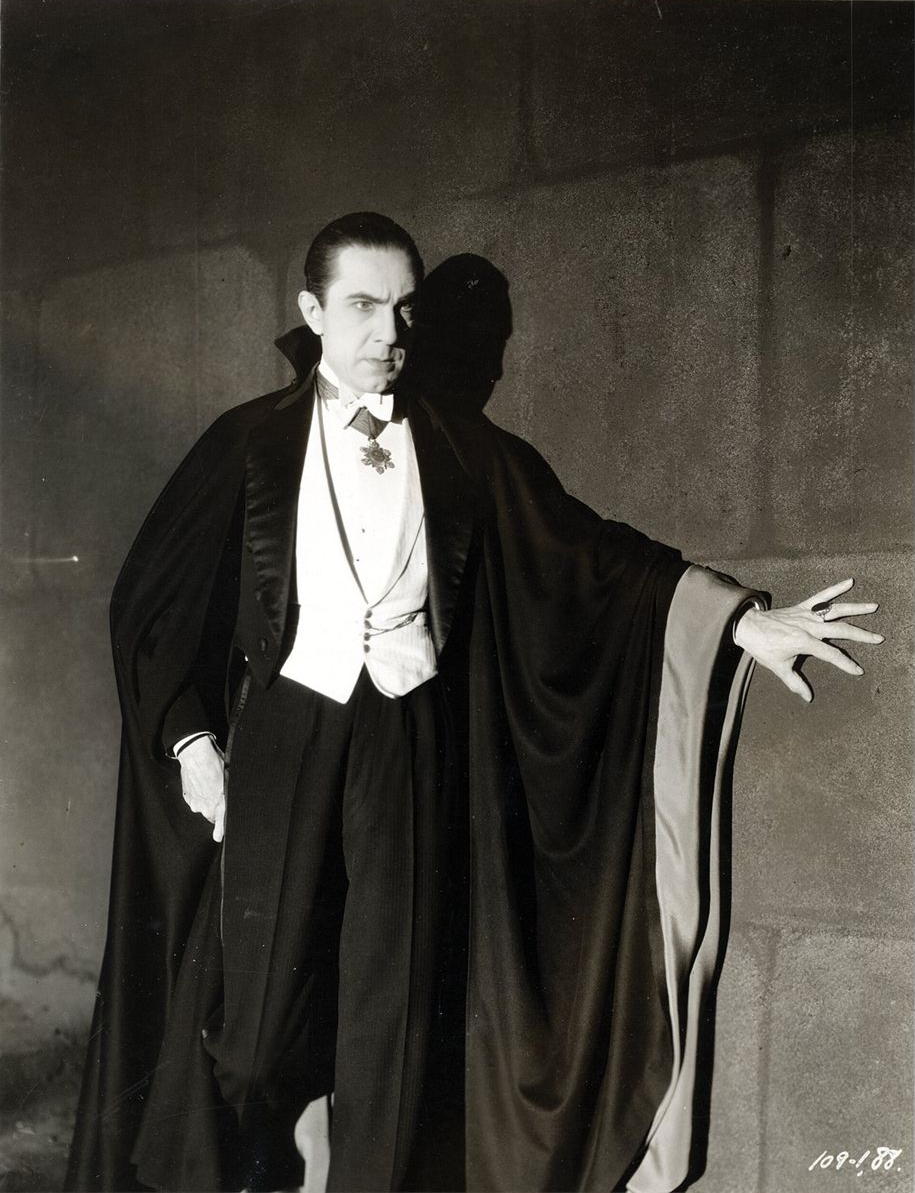
Lugosi as Dracula

- Hungarian actor Bela Lugosi played the title role in the premiere of the Broadway production of Dracula. Produced by Horace Liveright, and adapted by John L. Balderston from Bram Stoker's novel, it was a popular and critical success, running for seven months at the Fulton Theatre before going on tour. Lugosi, who was offered the role after Raymond Huntley's salary demands proved a problem, reprised his role as a vampire on film in 1931 and became a horror movie star.
- Died: Sam Warner, 40, CEO of Warner Bros. Studios, died of mastoiditis the day before the premiere of The Jazz Singer

== October 6, 1927 (Thursday) ==
- At 8:45 pm, The Jazz Singer, starring Al Jolson, was presented for the first time. The Warner Brothers film was shown at the Warner Theater in New York, which had been specially wired for sound with the Vitaphone system. It was the first "talkie", with sound synchronized to the film, although much of it was silent, with title cards, and in cities without the sound system, was seen as another silent movie. The first words heard by the audience were Jolson, as Jakie Rabinowitz, shouting to an orchestra, ""Wait a minute! Wait a minute! I tell ya, you ain't heard nothin' yet!" In keeping with the film's theme of a conflict within a Jewish family, the film premiered after sunset on the eve of the Yom Kippur holiday.
- Born: Antony Grey, English gay rights activist; in Wilmslow, Cheshire (d. 2010)
- Died: Amy Catherine Robbins Wells, 55, wife of science fiction author H. G. Wells. The character of Amy Robbins was portrayed by Mary Steenburgen in the 1979 science fiction film Time After Time, the premise being that Robbins was a 1979 bank employee who married Wells after traveling back to 1895.

== October 7, 1927 (Friday) ==
- Tommy Loughran, nicknamed The Philadelphia Phantom, became the light heavyweight boxing champion of the world, outpointing Mike McTigue in 15 rounds. Loughran retired in 1929 in order to pursue, unsuccessfully, the heavyweight title.
- The sudden collapse of the Kimberly-Clark factory in Appleton, Wisconsin, killed 9 people and injured 18 others.
- Born:
  - R. D. Laing, Scottish opponent of psychiatry; in Glasgow (d. 1989)
  - Tony Beckley, English character actor; in Southampton, Hampshire (d. 1980)
- Died: John Shillington "Jack" Prince, 68, British cricketer and bicyclist. He also built tracks for bicycle, motorcycle and sprint car racing.

== October 8, 1927 (Saturday) ==
- The Second 100 Years, the first film in which Stan Laurel and Oliver Hardy received top billing, was released.
- The New York Yankees, aided by their six consecutive batters dubbed "Murderer's Row" (Earle Combs, Mark Koenig, Babe Ruth, Lou Gehrig, Bob Meusel, and Tony Lazzeri) completed a 4-game sweep of the Pittsburgh Pirates in the World Series, with a 4–3 win.
- In what has been described as "the first ever tactic of using downed aircrew as bait to ambush rescue forces", Sandinista guerrillas shot down a U.S. Army Air Corps biplane over Nicaragua near Jicaro then ambushed the would-be rescuers, killing four members of the Nicaraguan Guardia Nacional and wounding some of the U.S. Army forces. The two American crewmen, 2nd. Lt. Earl Thomas and Sgt. Frank Dowdell, survived the crash but were later executed.
- Born: César Milstein, Argentine scientist, and winner of 1984 Nobel Prize for Medicine; in Bahía Blanca (d. 2002)

== October 9, 1927 (Sunday) ==
- The fire department in Spokane, Washington, blamed a house fire on sunlight and a goldfish bowl, reporting that the glass bowl "acted as a lens, focusing the sun's rays to a single point of impact" to set aflame a curtain at the home of Mrs. E. C. Barrett.
- The Mexican Army battled anti-government rebels as the two forces met at Vera Cruz at 3:00 in the afternoon. The fighting lasted until 8:00 pm the next evening, and the insurrection against the Calles government was suppressed.

== October 10, 1927 (Monday) ==
- Spain's National Assembly was allowed to meet by dictator Primo Rivera for the first time since his ascension to power in 1923.
- Porgy, based on the novel by DuBose Heyward, opened on Broadway at the Guild Theatre as a play, eight years before the opera Porgy and Bess, running for 217 performances before going on tour.
- The 1922 lease of rights to the Wyoming's Teapot Dome oil field, granted by then U.S. Secretary of the Interior Albert Fall in return for personal favors during the Teapot Dome scandal, was held to be invalid by unanimous decision of U.S. Supreme Court.
- The jazz musical Jazz Mania premiered, with Duke Ellington's band.
- The Palace Museum Library, formerly limited to use by the family and staff of the Emperor of China, was opened to scholars in Beijing.
- The Sidewalks of New York, a musical inspired by the popular 1894 song of the same name and starring Ruby Keeler, opened on Broadway at the Knickerbocker Theatre,
- Born:
  - Dana Elcar, American actor and director, known for the TV series MacGyver; in Ferndale, Michigan (d. 2005)
  - David Dinkins, first African-American Mayor of New York City (1990-1993); in Trenton, New Jersey (d. 2020)
  - Hazel Johnson-Brown, first African-American female to become a general in the United States Army; in West Chester, Pennsylvania (d. 2011)
- Died: Gustave Whitehead, 53, German-American aviation pioneer, died of a heart attack while attempting to lift an engine from a car

== October 11, 1927 (Tuesday) ==
- Pilot Ruth Elder took off from New York in the airplane American Girl, with her co-pilot, George Haldeman, in an attempt to become the first woman to duplicate Charles Lindbergh's transatlantic crossing to Paris. Mechanical problems caused them to ditch the plane 360 miles from land, but they established a new over-water endurance flight record of 2,623 miles.
- Mona McLellan, real name Dr. Dorothy Cochrane Logan, arrived at Folkestone after reportedly breaking Gertrude Ederle's record for swimming the English Channel, with a new time of 13 hours and 10 minutes. For the feat, she won a $5,000 prize from the British newspaper News of the World. Days later, she revealed that her Channel swim had been a hoax, designed to demonstrate the lack of monitoring or verification of record-breaking attempts.
- Born: William J. Perry, U.S. Secretary of Defense 1994–1997; in Vandergrift, Pennsylvania

== October 12, 1927 (Wednesday) ==
- Wright Field, located near Dayton, Ohio, was dedicated for use by the United States Army Air Corps. The land was created from Wilbur Wright Field and an additional acreage, and renamed in Wilbur's honor and that of Orville Wright. The field is now part of the Wright-Patterson Air Force Base.
- Florence Mills, the African-American actress who had become an international superstar while on tour in Europe, made a triumphant return to New York City. She would die of a ruptured appendix almost three weeks later, after postponing surgery "to attend to the demands of celebrity"
- Died: Alonzo M. Griffen, 80, American preacher and lawyer, died while making an impassioned speech to the National Spiritualist Association of Churches convention in San Antonio, Texas.

== October 13, 1927 (Thursday) ==
- The Chicago American Giants of baseball's Negro National League defeated the Bacharach Giants of Atlantic City, New Jersey of the Eastern Colored League, 11 to 4, to win the Negro Leagues' Colored World Series, 5 games to 3.
- "Big Joe" Lonardo, the organized crime boss of Cleveland since 1919, was ambushed along with his brother John after being lured to a barber shop owned by his rival, Joe Porrello, who then declared himself the new Cleveland mob boss. Porrello would be killed in 1930.
- Born:
  - Turgut Özal, Prime Minister of Turkey, 1983–1989 and later President of Turkey, 1989–1993; in Malatya (d. 1993)
  - Lee Konitz, American jazz composer and alto saxophonist;, in Chicago (d. 2020)

== October 14, 1927 (Friday) ==
- Dieudonne Costas and Joseph Le Brix became the first persons to fly an airplane across the South Atlantic Ocean, and the first to make an east-to-west transatlantic crossing, departing Saint-Louis, Senegal and arriving in Port Natal, Brazil 21 hours and 15 minutes later, at 11:40 pm local time.
- Born:
  - Roger Moore, English film and TV actor known for portraying fictional secret agent James Bond in seven movies, as well as the title character of the British thriller The Saint; in Stockwell, London (d. 2017)
  - Patricia Crowther, British witch and promoter of Wicca; in Sheffield, Yorkshire (d. 2025)

== October 15, 1927 (Saturday) ==
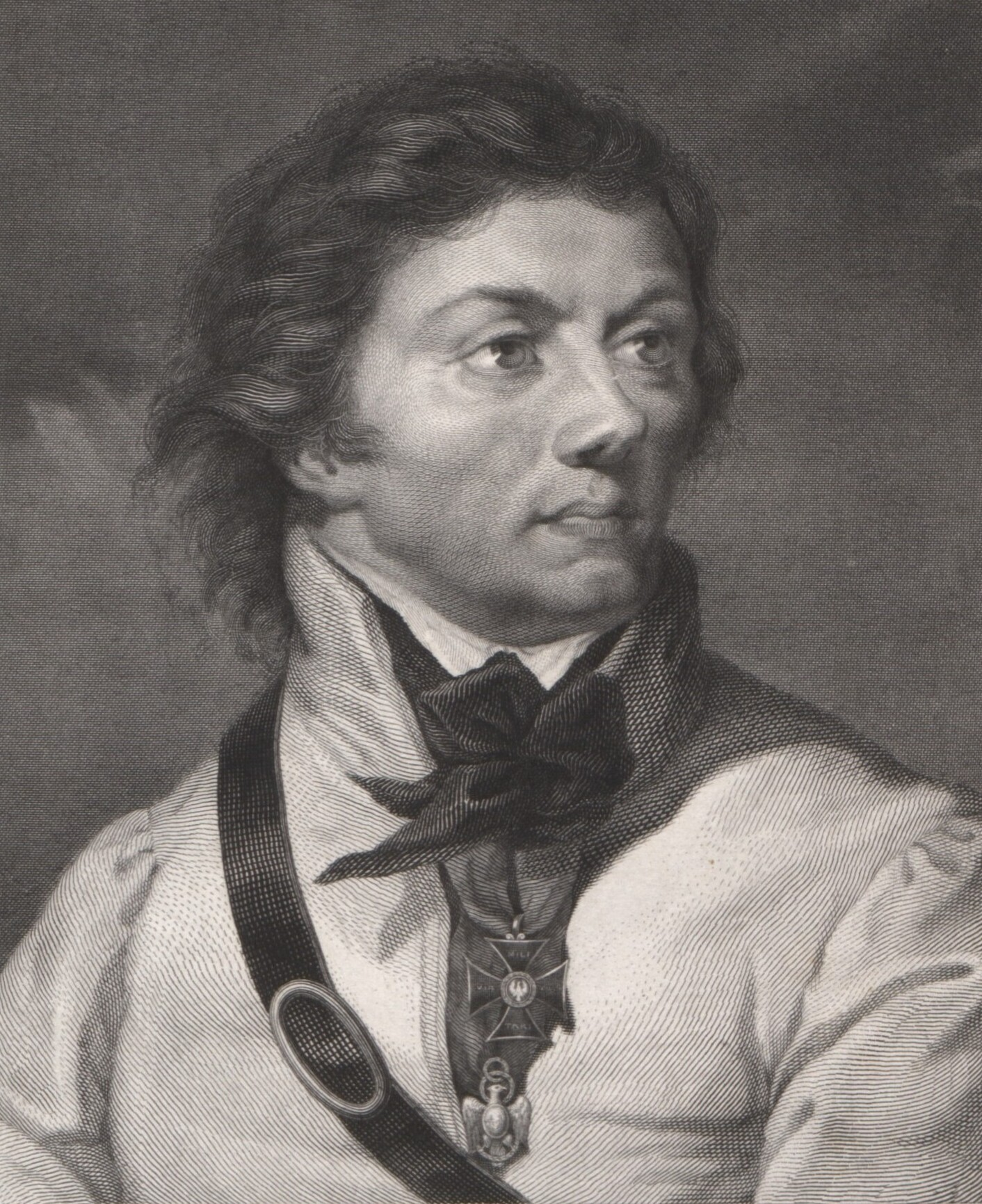
Kosciuszko

- Oil was discovered in Iraq at 3:00 AM in the Baba Gurgur fields 50 miles south of Kirkuk, with a gusher that erupted after drilling had reached a depth of 1,500 feet. The strike created the first major oil field in the Middle East.
- Mustafa Kemal, later given the honorific Atatürk (Father of the Turks) began the speech called the Nutuk, for six hours a day over six days, "the primary source for the official Turkish version of the history of the resistance movement"
- Germany's highest court, the Staatsgerichtshof, declared itself to be the "Guardian of the Constitution" of the Weimar republic
- In a drive-by shooting on Manhattan's Norfolk Street, Louis "Lepke" Buchalter assassinated "Little Augie" Orgenstein, industrial racketeer, and wounded "Legs" Diamond.
- The heart of General Tadeusz Kościuszko (1746–1817), a hero of the American Revolution, was returned to Warsaw in a bronze urn, after having been stored for 90 years in a museum at Rapperswil in Switzerland.
- The inaugural English Greyhound Derby was won by Entry Badge on the 500 yards (460 m) track at London's White City Stadium. It was limited to six greyhound dogs, chosen by regional competitions, with the top three finishers for the Northern Championship and Southern Championship having competed on October 8 at White City and at Manchester's the Belle Vue Stadium. Great Chum, who had won at Manchester, was unable to compete and its place was taken by the fourth finisher, Derham, while Entry Badge was the Southern semifinalist. For finishing first, Entry Badge won earned his owner the gold cup trophy and the purse of £1,000. Ever Bright and Elder Brother finished second and third.
- Born: Jeannette Charles, English actress who portrayed Queen Elizabeth II in numerous TV shows and films due to her close resemblance to the monarch; in London (d. 2024)

== October 16, 1927 (Sunday) ==
- The first remnant of Peking Man, a tooth, was found by paleontologist Anders Birger Bohlin at Chou K'ou Tien (Zhoukoudian), under sponsorship of Davidson Black, who gave it the scientific name Sinanthropus pekinensis. More remains would be discovered over the next ten years, and reclassified as Homo erectus pekinensis, estimated to be more than 300,000 years old. The specimens would disappear in 1941.
- Born:
  - Günter Grass, German writer, Nobel Prize in Literature laureate 1999; in Langfuhr, Danzig (now Wrzeszcz, Poland) (d. 2015)
  - Roberto Oropeza Martinez, Mexican writer, in Querétaro

== October 17, 1927 (Monday) ==
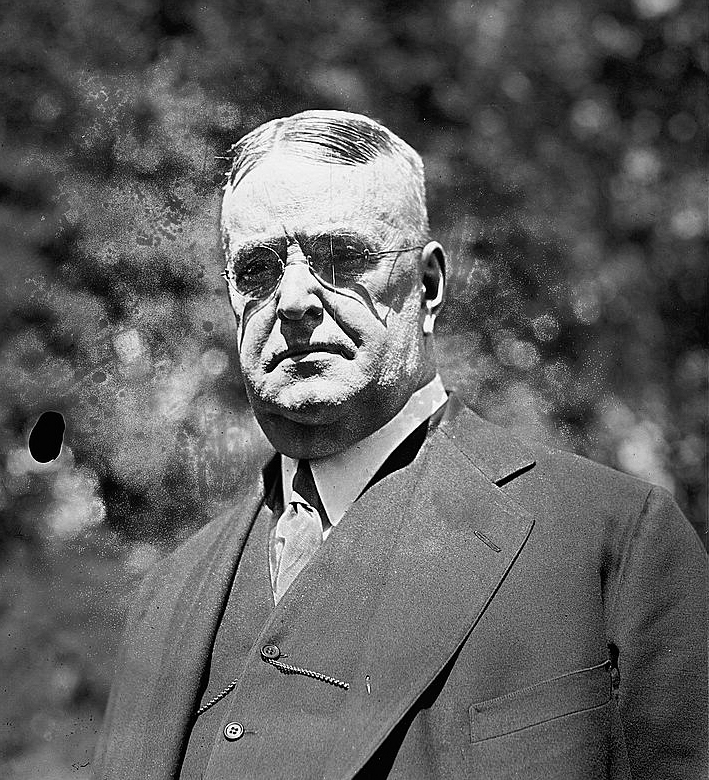
Johnson

- Ban Johnson, who had founded the American League in 1901, was forced to step down from the post of president of the AL.
- A revision of the constitution of the semi-independent Republic of Lebanon reduced the size of the legislature and gave President Charles Debbas the power to appoint one-third of its members. Lebanon remained a protectorate of France, through a High Commissioner.
- In the Teapot Dome scandal, the criminal trial of former Interior Secretary Albert B. Fall and former Mammoth Oil chief Harry F. Sinclair began.
- Born: Friedrich Hirzebruch, German mathematician specializing in algebraic geometry, and co-discoverer of the Hirzebruch-Riemann-Roch theorem; at Hamm (d. 2012)

== October 18, 1927 (Tuesday) ==
- The Schwartzbard trial began in Paris. Sholom Schwartzbard stood trial for the murder of the Ukrainian statesman Symon Petliura. Schwartzbard had confessed to the murder all along but said he did it to avenge the pogroms in Ukraine
- Born: George C. Scott, American film and TV actor, Oscar and Emmy Award winner best known for Patton; in Wise, Virginia (d. 1999)
- Died: Jacques de Lesseps, 44, French aviator and World War I hero, along with his flight engineer Theodor Chichenko, after their plane disappeared off of the coast of Quebec.

== October 19, 1927 (Wednesday) ==
- The case of Buck v. Bell was decided. Carrie Buck, who had fought all the way to the U.S. Supreme Court to have forced sterilization declared unconstitutional- and lost- was sterilized by Dr. Bell. She was one of 50,000 American women sterilized in accordance with state laws, and the case was cited by Nazi lawyers in the sterilization of 2,000,000 women.
- What would become the border between Singapore and Malaysia was worked out by agreement of the United Kingdom and the Sultan of the State of Johor.
- Born: Pierre Alechinsky, Belgian painter; in Brussels

== October 20, 1927 (Thursday) ==
- The Stamps Quartet, consisting of Odis Echols, Roy Wheeler, Palmer Wheeler, Dwight Brock, first recorded the gospel music bestseller "Give the World a Smile". The upbeat song inspired its own genre of gospel music.

== October 21, 1927 (Friday) ==
- Groundbreaking was held for the George Washington Bridge on both shores of the Hudson River, and on the river itself (on a boat). The bridge would open eight months ahead of schedule, in October 1931.

== October 22, 1927 (Saturday) ==
- Abie's Irish Rose closed after a run of 2,327 performances, after having opened on May 23, 1922. At the time, it was the longest running play in Broadway history, and was later passed by Life with Father in 1941.
- Died:
  - Ross Youngs, 30, American baseball outfielder and Hall of Fame member, died of kidney failure from Bright's disease
  - Borisav "Bora" Stanković, 51, Serbian Yugoslavian writer

== October 23, 1927 (Sunday) ==
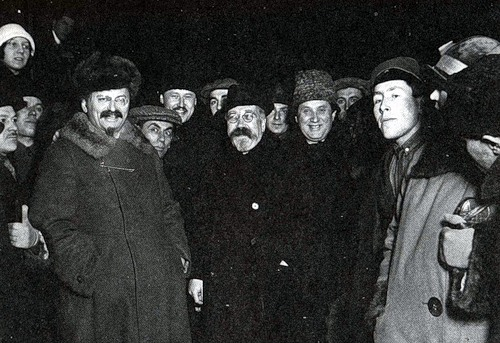
Trotsky, Lev Kamenev and Zinoviev

- Following an angry confrontation between Leon Trotsky and Joseph Stalin, Trotsky and Grigory Zinoviev were expelled from the Central Committee of the Communist Party of the Soviet Union.
- The Imatra Cinema was destroyed in a fire in Tampere, Finland, during showing the 1924 film Wages of Virtue; 21 people died in the fire and almost 30 were injured.
- Born:
  - Barron Hilton, American hotel operator; in Dallas (d. 2019)
  - Leszek Kołakowski, Polish philosopher; in Radom (d. 2009)
  - Philip Lamantia, American beatnik poet; in San Francisco (d. 2005)
  - Sonny Criss, American jazz musician, in Memphis, Tennessee (d. 1977)

== October 24, 1927 (Monday) ==
- Mao Zedong formulated his "Three Rules of Discipline" (1.Obey orders 2.Don't take anything from the workers or peasants and 3.Turn over anything taken from others). This was followed by Six Points for Attention on January 25, 1928, with two more added in January 1929.
- The first Model A automobile rolled off the assembly line.
- Born: Barbara Robinson, American children's author known for The Best Christmas Pageant Ever; in Portsmouth, Ohio (d. 2013)
- Died:
  - S. Davies Warfield, 68, American railroad magnate and philanthropist
  - Benny Marinelli, 24, American horse racing jockey, committed suicide by inhaling gas from an oven, four years after having won the 1923 Preakness and two years after being seriously injured in another race.

== October 25, 1927 (Tuesday) ==
- The sinking of the Italian luxury liner Principessa Mafalda killed 293 of the 1,256 people on board. With 998 passengers and a crew of 258, the ship was approaching Porto Seguro, Brazil, when its boilers exploded. Nearby ships were able to rescue 963 of the persons who had been on board. The others were missing and presumed to have gone down with the ship.
- Born:
  - Lawrence Kohlberg, American philosopher and psychologist; in Bronxville, New York (committed suicide 1987)
  - Jorge Batlle Ibáñez, President of Uruguay from 2000 to 2005; in Montevideo (d. 2016)
  - Barbara Cook, American stage actress; in Atlanta (d. 2017)

== October 26, 1927 (Wednesday) ==
- The Schwartzbard trial ended when Sholom Schwartzbard was acquitted on all criminal counts.
- Died: Hermann Muthesius, 66, German architect, was killed in an auto accident

== October 27, 1927 (Thursday) ==
- Queen Wilhelmina of the Netherlands opened the Meuse-Waal Canal in Nijmegen.
- At 5:50 a.m. a ground fault gave way, causing the mine and part of the town of Worthington to collapse into a large chasm located in Ontario, Canada. Nobody was injured in the incident, because the area was evacuated the night before after a mine foreman noticed abnormal rock shifts in the mine.
- Born:
  - Mikhail Postnikov, Soviet Russian mathematician; in Shatura, Moscow oblast, Russian SFSR (d. 2004)
  - Dominick Argento, American musician and Pulitzer Prize winner; in York, Pennsylvania (d. 2019)
  - Paul Graf, Canadian biologist credited with saving the aurora trout from extinction; in Steinheim (d. 2015)
  - Jimmy Slyde, American tap dancer; in Atlanta (d. 2008)
- Died:
  - Edward Guinness, 79, Irish beer brewer
  - John "Squizzy" Taylor, 39, Australian gangster, was killed in a shootout with a rival

== October 28, 1927 (Friday) ==
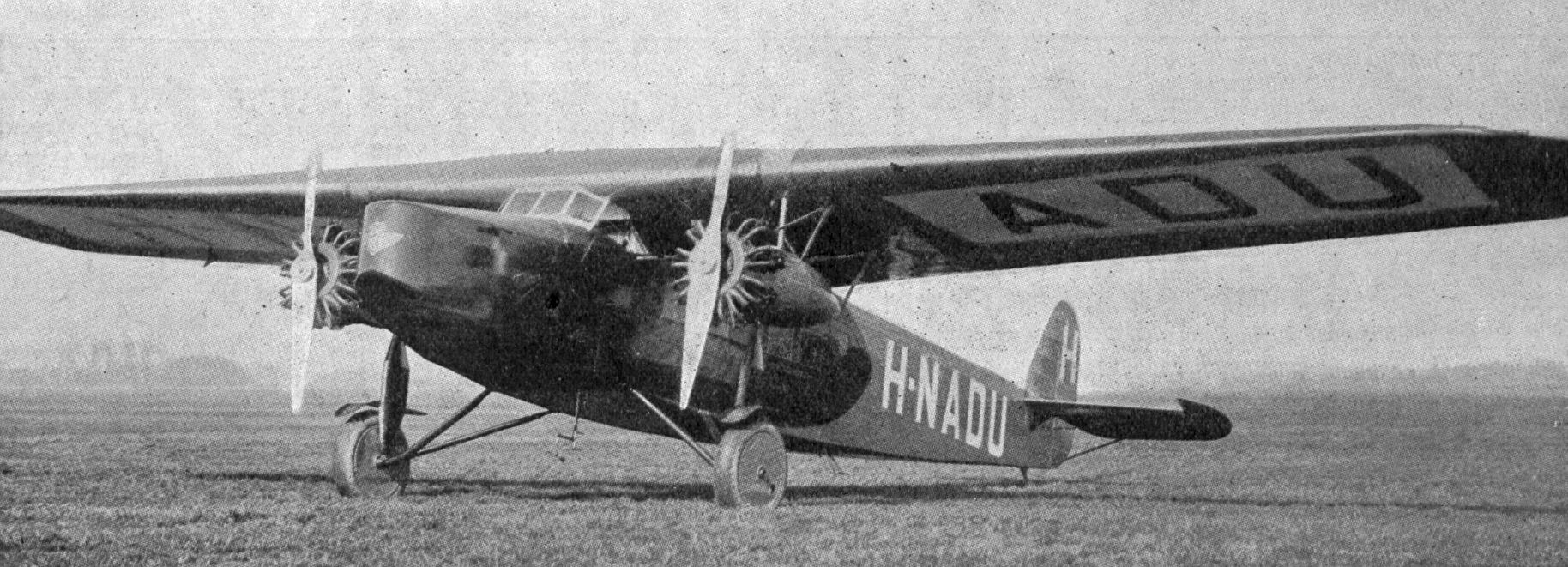
A Fokker F-VIII

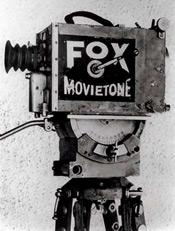
Fox Movietone camera

- Fox Movietone News presented the first synchronized-sound newsreel, at the Roxy Theater in New York.
- Pan American Airways made the first regularly scheduled international flight by an American airline (and Pan Am's very first flight), with pilot Hugh Wells taking off from Key West, Florida, to Havana, Cuba, in a tri-motor Fokker F-VIII. Passenger service did not begin until January 16, 1928. Pan Am's very last flight would also be international and from a Caribbean island to Florida, as Captain Mark Pyle brought Pan Am Flight 436 from Bridgetown, Barbados to a landing in Miami on December 4, 1991.
- In Cleggan Bay off the west coast of Ireland, 45 fishermen drowned when an unexpected storm blew in. Twenty-five were from County Galway, 16 from the village of Rossadilisk (near Connemara) and nine from Inishbofin, while twenty more were from County Mayo in Lacken (near Ballycastle) and in the Inishkea Islands. Marie Feeney, the granddaughter of one of the survivors, would write about the tragedy 75 years later in a 2002 book, The Cleggan Bay Disaster.
- Born: Roza Makagonova, Soviet Russian actress; in Samara, RSFSR (d. 1995)

== October 29, 1927 (Saturday) ==
- The Central Committee of the Communist Party of the USSR adopted the resolution "On the Cleansing of Libraries from Ideologically Harmful Literature", requiring the removal of disapproved books across the Soviet Union.
- Born: Lt. Col. Yuri Nosenko, Soviet Ukrainian KGB agent who defected to the United States in 1964, and was imprisoned on suspicion of being a double agent until 1967; in Nikolayev, Ukrainian SSR. (d. 2008)

== October 30, 1927 (Sunday) ==
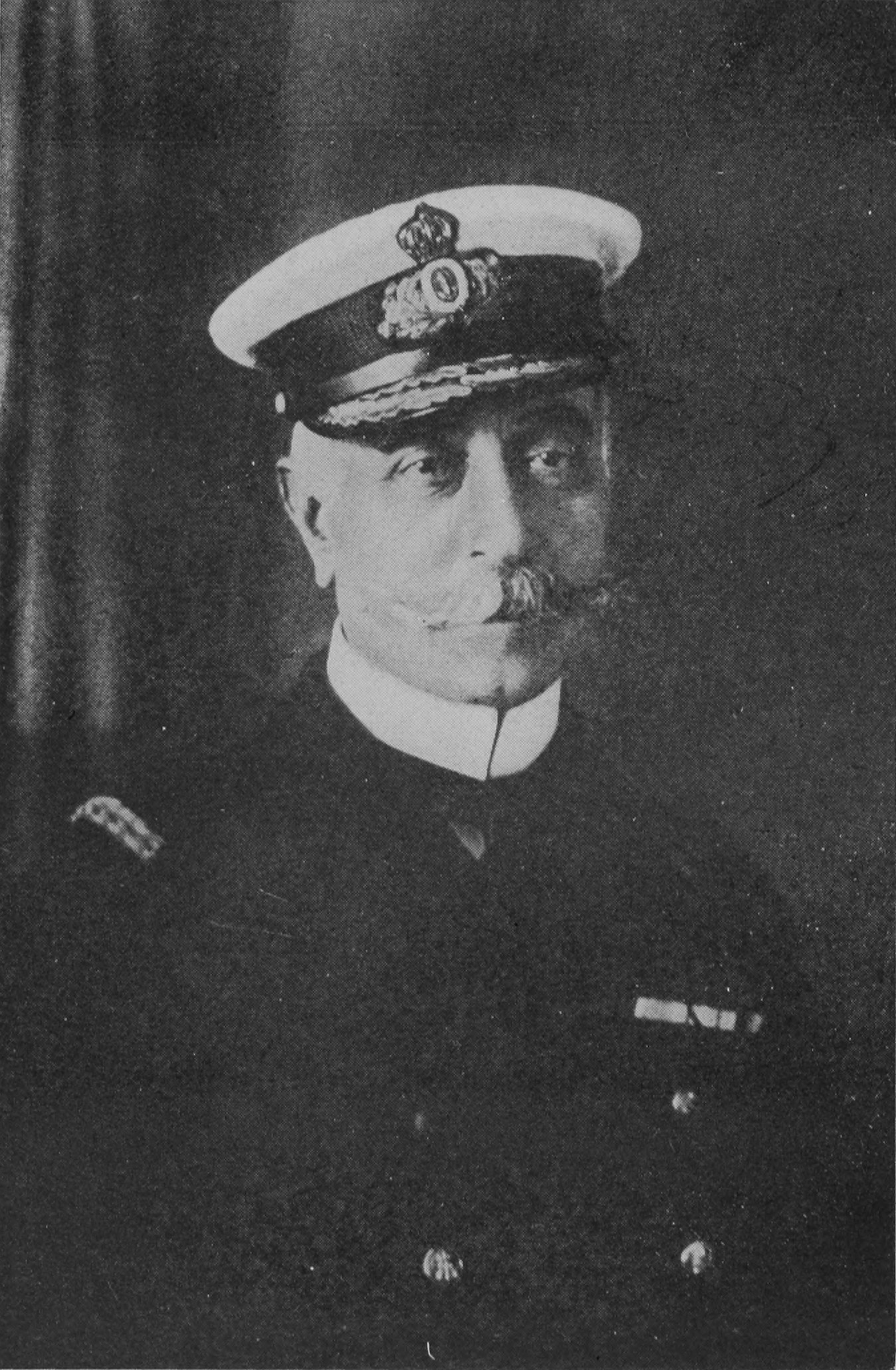
Kondouriotis

- Admiral Paul Kondouriotis, the President of Greece, survived an assassination attempt by a 25-year-old waiter. Zafioios Goussies shot President Kondouriotis in the head as the President was leaving a conference of Greece's mayors in Athens.

== October 31, 1927 (Monday) ==
- The drifting ship Ryo Yei Maru was spotted off of Cape Flattery, Washington State. When the American freighter Margaret Dollar arrived, the rescuers found the emaciated bodies of all twelve of the Japanese ship's crew. The ship's engine had failed on December 23, 1926, during a gale, and the men on board slowly died of starvation, with the last one succumbing on May 11, 1927. Having drifted 5,000 miles, the ship was towed into Seattle. After a Buddhist funeral ceremony for the 12 men, their bodies were cremated and the vessel was burned.
