= Battle of Las Cruces (1928) =

Second Battle of Las Cruces
- Part of the Occupation of Nicaragua, Banana Wars
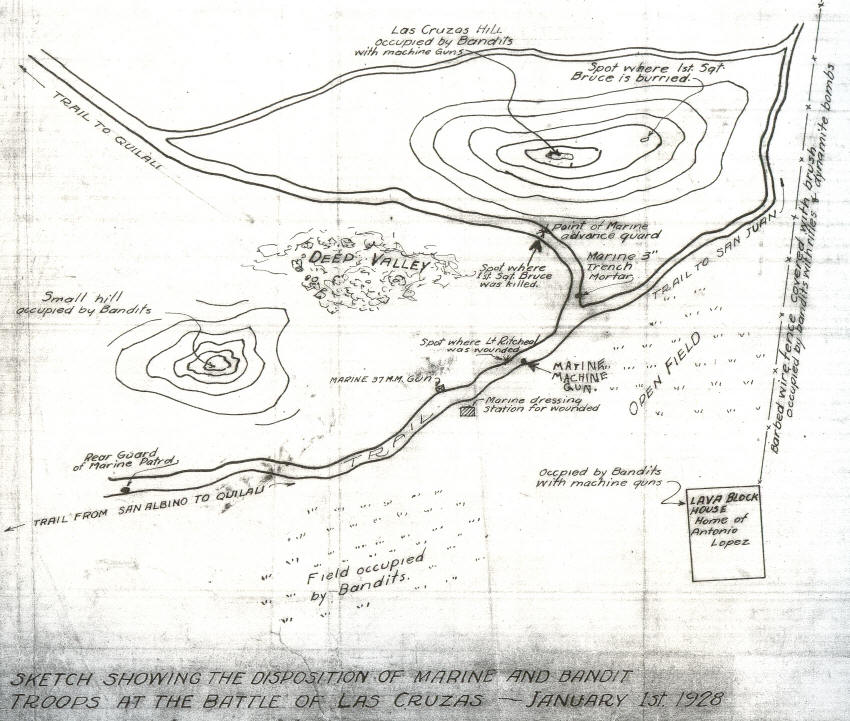
- A plan of the battle by Merton Richal.
Date	1 January 1928
Location	Las Cruces Hill, Nicaragua
Result	American-Nicaraguan victory

Belligerents
United States; Nicaragua	Sandinistas

Commanders and leaders
(United States) Lt. Merton A. Richal	(Nicaragua) Col. Francisco Estrada

Strength
174 marines & national guard 1 field gun 1 mortar 2 biplanes	400 guerrillas

Casualties and losses
8 killed 31 wounded	20 killed

The Second Battle of Las Cruces, or the New Year's Day Battle, was a major engagement during the American occupation of Nicaragua. It was fought on 1 January 1928, during an expedition to destroy a Sandinista fortress. A column of United States Marines and Nicaraguan National Guardsmen were attacked by a superior force of rebels entrenched on Las Cruises Hill and, after a long battle, the Americans and Nicaraguans routed the Sandinistas and captured their positions.

== Background ==
During November 1927, marine reconnaissance aircraft detected the fortress of El Chipote, which was the main base of the Sandinista rebels, located near the border with Honduras. There was much rebel activity in the area so the American Marines and the Nicaraguan Guardsmen had no choice but to destroy the fortifications. Accordingly, two columns were dispatched on this mission, one under Captain Richard Livingston, composed of 115 men, and the second under First Lieutenant Merton A. Richal, composed of sixty-five men. Captain Livingston was in Jinotega and his orders were to leave on 19 December 1927, and meet with Richal's column, which was marching from Telpaneca, at Quilali. However, before the rendezvous both columns encountered resistance. Captain Livingston was the first to engage the rebels. While just 1,500 yards (1,400 m) south of Quilali, he was attacked by approximately 200 Sandinistas well concealed behind rocks and foliage. After an eighty-minute battle the rebels retreated, though they managed to kill five Marines and two of the guards; twenty-three others were wounded. Livingston then proceeded into Quilali without further opposition. On the same day, Lieutenant Richal's men were 22 miles (35 km) away from Telpaneca when they engaged in a twenty-minute skirmish with about fifty rebels, but the rebels were beaten off. One Marine was wounded in the engagement and the rebels are not believed to have suffered any casualties. After that Richal's small force continued towards the rendezvous and, on 1 January 1928, another battle was fought six miles (10 km) northwest of Quilali.

== Battle ==
At about 12:30 pm, the column was marching single file up the trail, when suddenly it was fired on by the Sandinistas from well entrenched positions at and around Las Cruces Hill, also called Sapotial Hill in the American report of the encounter. The location had been the scene of a rebel victory two months earlier. Colonel Francisco Estrada was in command of the rebels and he had about 400 men armed with several machine guns, rifles, pistols and dynamite, positioned in parapets made of pine trees. After the first shots, Richal ordered his men to return the enemy's fire which had mortally wounded Sergeant Thomas G. Bruce who was serving as a lieutenant and commander of the Nicaraguan Guardsmen. His body was later found stripped and mutilated. The Sandinistas then charged and forced the Marines and Guardsmen back fifty yards placing the latter within the protection of their 3-inch Stokes mortar and a Lewis machine gun which then opened up against the hill along with a 37-millimeter field piece positioned some distance up the trail. Richal ordered his men to form a skirmish line and he also noted that most of the fire, at that point, was coming from his right flank against the main body while a few rebels on his left flank were engaging both his main body and the rear guard. Though the machine gun used by the marines eventually jammed, rifle fire and that of the artillery successfully held off further Sandinista attacks. Gunnery Sergeant Edward G. Brown, who assumed command after Richal was hit, counterattacked with a handful of men and captured the hill as the rebels fled. Immediately afterwards, two American biplanes arrived on scene and began strafing the retreating rebels.

== Aftermath ==
Augusto César Sandino, the rebel general who was known to exaggerate, claimed that his men won the battle after three hours of fighting. Sandino also stated that ninety-seven Americans were killed, mostly by machetes, and another sixty men were wounded. He claimed that six Lewis machine guns, three M1A1 Thompsons, forty-six Lewis automatic rifles and sixteen pack mules loaded with ammunition were captured, as well as battle plans and a code book for communicating with American aircraft. Captain Livingston, knowing Richal was likely to run into an ambush during the march, sent a platoon of sharpshooters under Second Lieutenant A. T. Hunt, to reinforce the column. This force of about twenty men arrived at Las Cruces Hill at 2:15 pm, after the fighting was over. Both Richal and Hunt's men camped on the hill for the night. On the next day, they proceeded into Quilali without opposition. Meanwhile, Sandino reinforced his defeated troops and besieged Quilali for a few days, which forced the Marines and guardsmen to abandon the expedition to El Chipote. During the battle Lieutenant Bruce was the only fatality although Richal was seriously wounded when he was hit in the eye by a bullet, three others were also wounded while an estimated twenty rebels were killed. Richal later received a Navy Cross for his conduct in the engagement.

Lt. Christian Schilt performed the first recorded American combat medical evacuation by fixed-wing aircraft under fire, when he made ten missions to an improvised strip 200 feet long and 100 feet wide.

== See also ==
- Banana Wars
- Chesty Puller
