= Cocoa panyols =

Ethnic group in Trinidad and Tobago

Cocoa Panyols
Regions with significant populations
- Trinidad and Tobago · Venezuela · Colombia · United States · Canada · United Kingdom

Languages
- Trinidadian and Tobagonian English · Trinidadian Creole · Tobagonian Creole · Trinidadian Spanish · Spanglish

Religion
- Christianity (mostly Roman Catholicism)

Related ethnic groups
- Moreno Venezuelans · Pardo · Spanish · South American Amerindian · Trinidadian and Tobagonian Amerindian · Afro-Latin American · Afro-Venezuelans · Afro-Colombians · Afro-Trinidadian and Tobagonian

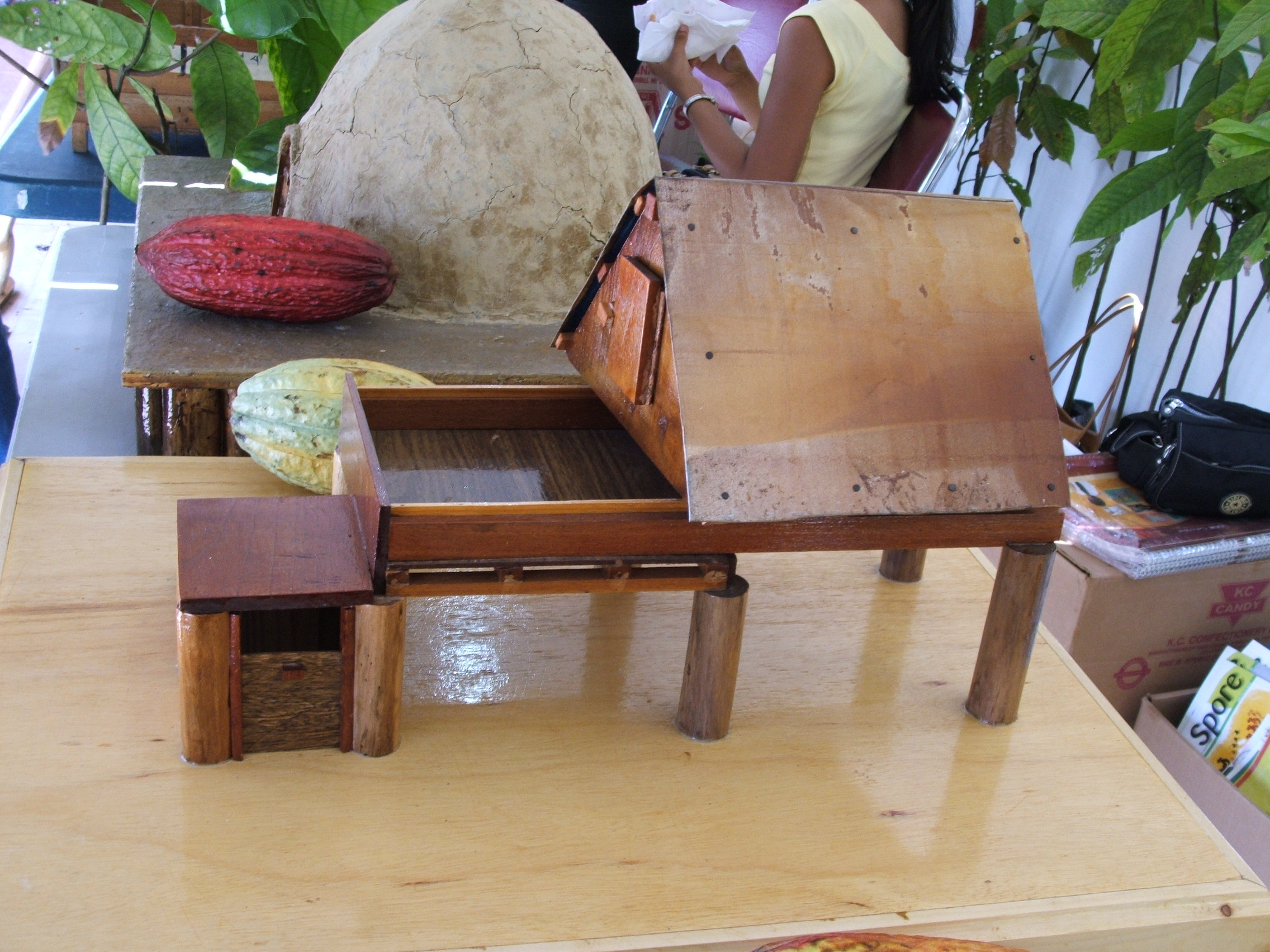
Cocoa Drying House (model), Trinidad

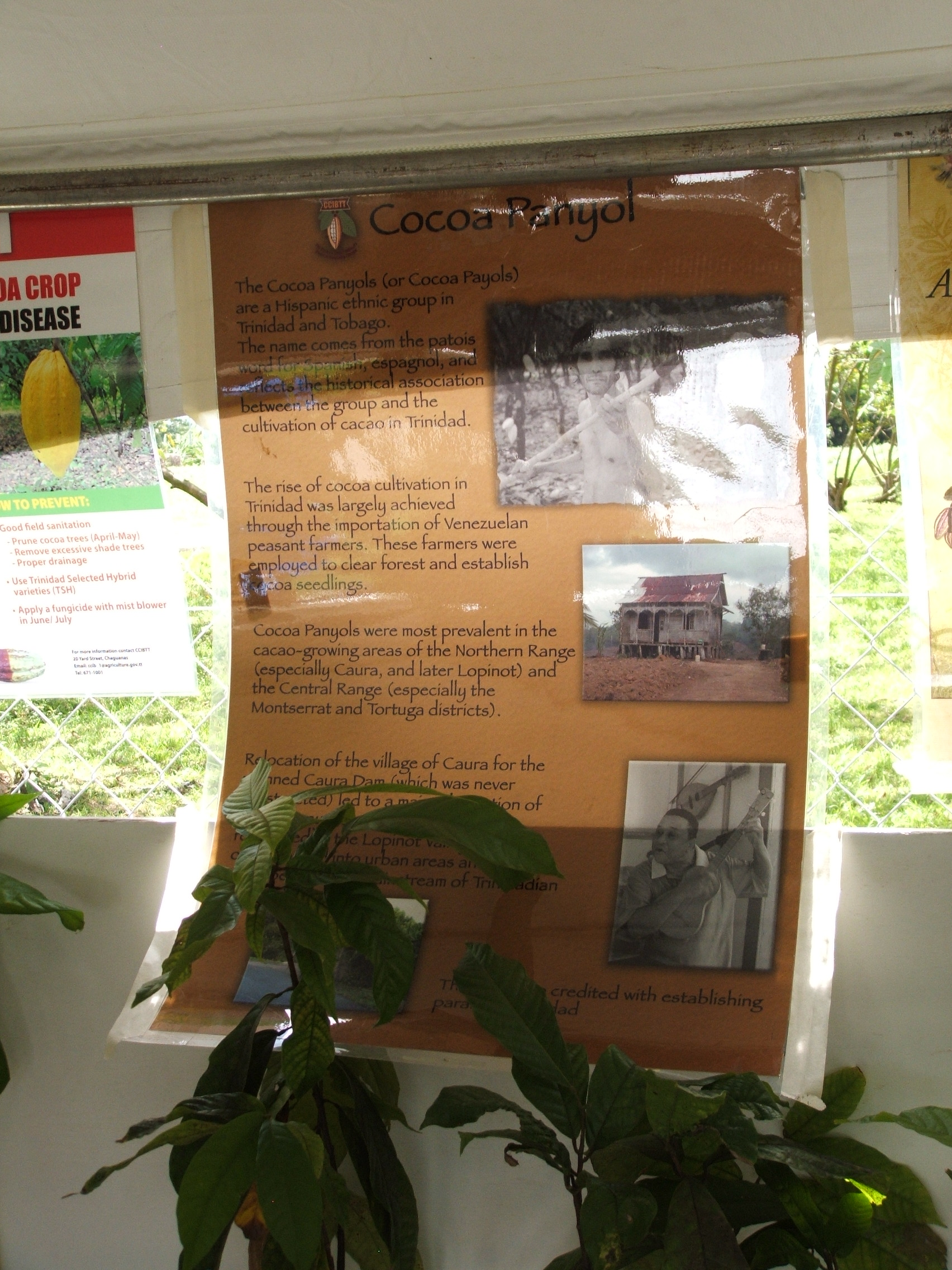
Cocoa Panyols (Chart), Trinidad

The Panyols are a tri-racial pardo ethnic group in Trinidad and Tobago of African, European, and South American descent, primarily of mixed, mestizo and Indigenous South American, Afro-Trinidadian, and White Trinidadian descent. The name is a derivation of the word 'español', as well as the community's settlement in what became predominantly cocoa cultivated regions of Trinidad. Also referred to as Pagnols or Payols, the panyol communities draw cultural influence from both sides of the Gulf of Paria, and are predominantly found within the Northern Range rainforest mountains and valleys of Trinidad, with South American cultural influences most predominantly derived from regions around the Orinoco, and Caura River, Venezuela.

== Panyols and Cocoa Panyols self references ==
The Venezuelan and Colombian peasant cocoa-farm workers of the Venezuelan ancestry of Panyol landowners were referred to as Cocoa Panyols (or Cocoa Payols). The present-day Panyols of Trinidad and Tobago are descendants of those Venezuelan, Colombian, and Spanish settlers, whose ancestors originated from Canary Islands, and Gulf of Paria and neighboring region ethnic Indigenous communities on both sides of the Gulf of Paria, its Peninsulas, and into the Northern Range Rain Forest Mountains Valleys, of Trinidad. They traveled over the Chaguaramas Peninsula and Mountains of Diego Martin into the Rain Forest of the Northern Mountain Range of Trinidad and formed Villages high and deep in various parts of the Mountains to the Caura region, and via Caura River Trinidad, in past history and later generations during the Cédula de Población of 1783.

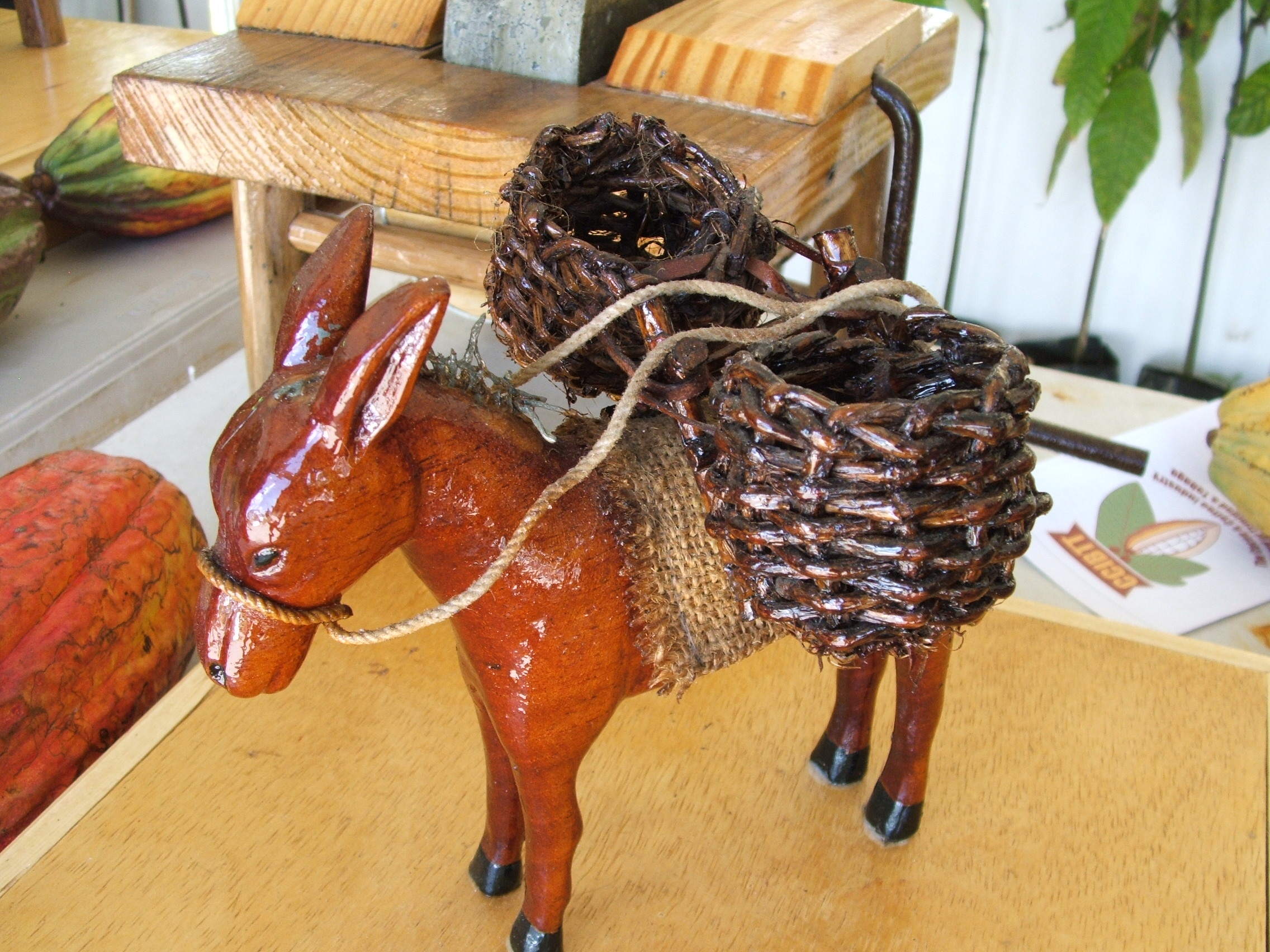
Donkey with panniers (model), Trinidad

== Multiracial ancestry ==
The Panyol identity is a result of encounters between Europeans, Africans and Indigenous Amerindians in Trinidad. Families of African and Amerindian descent are recorded as far back as 1841 within the Cocoa Estates Community. The Panyols were part of the Cedula of Populations, and included workers attracted from Venezuela after the 1838 Abolition of Slavery, for labour within the cocoa industry. Migrants from Venezuela settled and intermarried, in particular in Diego Martin with Africans of Sierra Leonese descent, and with that community formed an integral part of the Estate Lands settlers in that Region. Among the larger families of their descendants today are the Emmanuel, Herrera, Lara, Tardieu, George, Felix, Hospedales and Thomas families of Maraval, Paramin and Diego Martin. They became an integral part of the Cocoa Farms Estate owners and settled many of the lands and regions in Maraval, Paramin, Lopinot, St. Ann's, and Diego Martin. The name 'panyol' comes from the patois word for Spanish, espagnol, and the Spanish word español, and reflects the historical association between the group and the cultivation of cacao in Trinidad.

== Panyol Regions ==
Panyols were most prevalent in the forested mountain regions of the Northern Range including (Caura, Lopinot, Arima, Santa Cruz and Maraval), and the Central Range (especially the Montserrat and Tortuga districts). Also, large communities of panyols resided in the areas of Moruga, such as La Lune. The relocation of the village of Caura for the planned Caura Dam (which was never constructed) led to a major disruption of panyol communities.

Many families relocated to the Lopinot Valley, but others moved into urban areas and were absorbed into the mainstream of Trinidadian life. Some panyols merged into the French Creole, Afro-Trinidadian, East Indian communities and Dougla communities through intermarriage. In the Paramin region of Maraval, in the Northern Range, there was significant integration into the French Patois-speaking communities, giving rise to the Parang tradition in Paramin and the blending of Venezuelan and French Creole cultures.

== Cocoa Estate Panyols descendant Families ==
The community in Trinidad originated in the late seventeenth century (see History of Trinidad and Tobago). After the Island fell under British control in 1797, Spanish-speaking Venezuelans continued to settle in Trinidad, usually in connection with the independence wars and revolutions which followed. The rise of cocoa cultivation in Trinidad was largely achieved through the importation of Venezuelan peasant farmers. These farmers were employed to clear the forest and establish cocoa seedlings. After five to seven years, they were paid for each mature cocoa tree on the plot of land. Then, they moved on to a new plot of land, repeating this process. They are also credited with establishing parang in Trinidad.

The present descendants of Panyol in Trinidad are born of the communities thereof, and a few that intermarried with the Indigenous lines of the surrounding regions, on both sides of the Caura River, and a relatively small community of interrelated families over generations with those of the larger Cocoa Estate and Venezuelan Free Community prior to and after 1838 in Diego Martin, Maraval and Paramin.

Some intermarried with the Portuguese as well of Port-of-Spain and St. Ann's and settled lands in the St. Ann's Hills. They played an important role in the development of the cocoa industry in Trinidad and Tobago, running the Cocoa Estates, and are not to be confused with the free community of mixed-heritage born during slavery, or the Native Indian Groups in the lower regions that suffered through so much beneath the Mountains, and families of intermarriages with that community on both sides over generations.
