= Trinidadian Spanish =

Variety of Spanish language

- castellano trinitense, castellano trinitario
- Pronunciation: [kasteˈʝano tɾiniˈtense, - tɾiniˈtaɾjo]
- Native to: Trinidad and Tobago
- Region: Caribbean
- Ethnicity: Cocoa Panyols
- Native speakers: ~4000 (2019); L1 users: ~4000 (2019); L2 users: 66400
- Language family: Indo-European: Italic; Latino-Faliscan; Latin; Romance; Italo-Western; Western; Gallo-Iberian?; Iberian; West Iberian; Castilian; Spanish; Venezuelan Spanish; Trinidadian Spanish
- Early forms: Old Latin: Vulgar Latin; Proto-Romance; Old Spanish; Early Modern Spanish; Venezuelan Spanish
- Writing system: Latin (Spanish alphabet)

Official status
- Regulated by: None

Language codes
- ISO 639-1: es
- ISO 639-2: spa
- ISO 639-3: –
- Glottolog: None
- IETF: es-TT

Trinidadian Spanish (castellano trinitense or castellano trinitario) refers to the Spanish natively spoken by Cocoa Panyols in Trinidad and Tobago, which is very close to extinction.

The current situation of Spanish in Trinidad and Tobago is complex due to the recent influx of Venezuelan migrants and a misguided popular belief that there was never a hispanophone presence on the island, resulting in all Spanish speakers are labeled as Venezuelan or "Spanish". Most native Spanish speakers in Trinidad were historically found in the Santa Cruz, Caura Valley, Paramin, Lopinot and other rural communities working in and around the cocoa industry. The local dialect of Trinidadian Spanish is almost completely lost due to its social status (as a language for the poor or migrants), the prestige of English under British rule and larger influxes of non-Hispanic communities: East Indians, Chinese, Portuguese, Syrians, etc. But due to the country's proximity to the coast of Venezuela, the country is currently slowly developing a relationship with Spanish-speaking peoples, and therefore the government requires that Spanish be taught in secondary education. Specifically, in 2004, when the government appointed Spanish as the first foreign language, launched in March 2005, the East Indians, Chinese, Portuguese, Syrians, etc. study Spanish.

The last vestiges of Hispano-Trinidadian culture can be seen in the Christmas period. Traditional music from the Northern Range, Parang a galicismo of Parranda, uses the Joropo, Gaita and Polo music styles among others and is sung in Spanish. More recent Soca Parang and Chutney Parang have been performed in English. Pastelles, or pasteles in Spanish, are also eaten.

Trinidadian Spanish is closely related to the Spanish found in the east of Venezuela (Sucre, Caribbean Coast) and Margarita Island and shares many features with Caribbean Spanish in general. Due to the Venezuelan presence in Trinidad, it is likely that the local dialect of spoken Spanish will become ever more venezolano or sucrense.

== History ==
The Spanish claimed Trinidad in 1498 and settled on the island in 1560. Spanish speakers on the island have been present in some form ever since. European settlers were small in number but the indigenous people were taught and proselytized in Spanish. After the Cédula de Población, French Creole took over as lingua franca among the newly arrived peoples, then replaced by English after 1797 when Britain officially took the island. The second wave of Spanish speakers came in the form of peons, eastern Venezuelan agricultural workers who arrived in the early 19th century. Due to their low economic and social status, Spanish was stigmatized as a language of the panyols so was quickly dropped by many descendants or not taught at all for fear of passing on bad English.

Due to socioeconomic factors and geographic isolation, Spanish, the local variety especially, was not adopted or even heard by large parts of the population.

Except from these two larger migrations, throughout Trinidad's history, there have been movements of people in smaller numbers between Venezuela (and to a lesser extent other Spanish-speaking countries, mostly Colombia, Venezuela's neighbor) and Trinidad. These include the bozal, Spanish-speaking African Slaves from Latin America, descendants of Trinidadians who migrated from El Callao and Güiria and migrants from Maracaibo for the petroleum and cocoa industry. In the 21st century, this migration was induced by the economic decline in Venezuela and the island's close proximity and flights to other locations.

== Features ==
- Trinidadian Spanish shares almost all the features of Venezuelan Spanish, especially Eastern Venezuela.
- There is weak consonantism and strong vocalism, meaning that vowels stressed are lengthened and unstressed vowels become unvoiced or disappear (e.g., zapat instead of zapato, arep instead of arepa).
- Intervocalic fricative dentals are often lost in -ado/a and -ido/a endings, so madrugada becomes madrugá.
- The phoneme /l/ often replaces /r/ inside and at the end of words. This is common in rural Caribbean dialects.
- The phoneme /x/ is realized as glottal [h], which is common in Venezuela and other Caribbean dialects.
- Verbal archaisms are used such as vide, vido; truje, trujo; semos alongside the modern vi, vio; traje, trajo; somos.
- Other archaic words used include cuasi (casi), dende (desde), mientre (mientras), fogón (estufa o cocina), paila (sartén), candela (fuego).

== Lexicon ==
The lexicon of Trinidadian Spanish is very similar to that of Eastern Venezuelan and Margaritan Spanish, with some words borrowed from Cariban, Arawakan, English, Patois, Caribbean Hindustani, and Portuguese. It is most developed in the aspects of life that were traditionally most in the Panyol culture: Cocao, farming, hunting, religion, and food.

- Cachicamo: Armadillo
- Chaco: Sweet Potato
- Conuco: parcela de tierra, terreno
- Dite: hot drink
- Flema: llama
- Garratadera: Cocoa knife
- Macaurel o Macauel: Boa Constrictor
- Morrocoy: Red-footed tortoise
- Motoká: car
- Pana: balde
- Tomar el dite: desayunar
- Tucuche: Hummingbird

=== Place Names ===
- Blanquisel o Blanquizales: Blachissuese
- El Puelto: Port of Spain
- El Toco: Toco
- Filete: Filette Point
- La Misión: Princes Town
- Las Cotorras: Five Islands
- Maravaca: Saut D'eau Bay
- Matalote: Matalot
- Mayaroa: Mayaro
- Oropuche: Oropouche
- Sin Cuidado: San Souci
- Tamanaco: Mt. Tamana
