= Washtub bass =

Stringed musical instrument

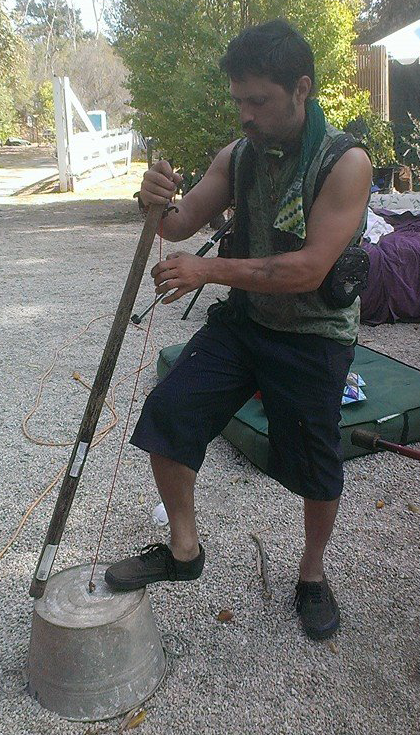
A small washtub bass being played

The washtub bass, or gutbucket, is a stringed instrument used in American folk music that uses a metal washtub as a resonator. Although it is possible for a washtub bass to have four or more strings and tuning pegs, traditional washtub basses have a single string whose pitch is adjusted by pushing or pulling on a staff or stick to change the tension.

The washtub bass was used in jug bands that were popular in some African-American communities in the early 1900s. In the 1950s, British skiffle bands used a variant called a tea chest bass, and during the 1960s, US folk musicians used the washtub bass in jug band-influenced music.

Variations on the basic design are found around the world, particularly in the choice of resonator. As a result, there are many different names for the instrument including the "gas-tank bass", "barrel bass", "box bass" (Trinidad), "bush bass" (Australia), "babatoni" (South Africa), "tanbou marengwen" (Haiti) "tingotalango" (Cuba), "tulòn" (Italy), "laundrophone" and others.

The hallmarks of the traditional design are simplicity, very low cost and do it yourself construction, leading to its historical association with lower economic classes. These factors also make it quite common for modern-day builders to promote modifications to the basic design, such as adding a finger board, pedal, electronic pickup, drumhead, or making the staff immovable.

== History ==
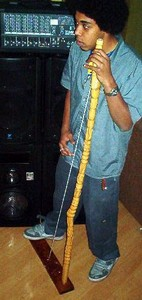
Electric "inbindi" bass which is amplified by a public address system

Ethnomusicologists trace the origins of the instrument to the 'ground bow' or 'ground harp' – a version that uses a piece of bark or an animal skin stretched over a pit as a resonator. The ang-bindi made by the Baka people of the Congo is but one example of this instrument found among tribal societies in Africa and Southeast Asia, and it lends its name to the generic term inbindi for all related instruments. Evolution of design, including the use of more portable resonators, has led to many variations, such as the dan bau (Vietnam) and gopichand (India), and more recently, the "electric one-string", which amplifies the sound using a pickup.

The washtub bass is sometimes used in a jug band, often accompanied by a washboard as a percussion instrument. Jug bands, first known as "spasm bands", were popular especially among African-Americans around 1900 in New Orleans and reached a height of popularity between 1925 and 1935 in Memphis and Louisville.

At about the same time, European-Americans of Appalachia were using the instrument in "old-timey" folk music. A musical style known as "gut-bucket blues" came out of the jug band scene, and was cited by Sam Phillips of Sun Records as the type of music he was seeking when he first recorded Elvis Presley.

According to Willie "The Lion" Smith's autobiography, the term "gutbucket" comes from "Negro families" who all owned their own pail, or bucket, and would get it filled with the makings for chitterlings. The term "gutbucket" came from playing a lowdown style of music.

In English skiffle bands, Australian and New Zealand bush bands and South African kwela bands, the same sort of bass has a tea chest as a resonator. The Quarrymen, John Lennon and Paul McCartney's band before the Beatles, featured a tea-chest bass, as did many young bands around 1956.

A folk music revival in the U.S. in the early 1960s re-ignited interest in the washtub bass and jug band music. Bands included Mother McCree's Uptown Jug Champions, which later became The Grateful Dead, and the Jim Kweskin Jug Band, which featured Fritz Richmond on bass.

== Tea chest bass ==
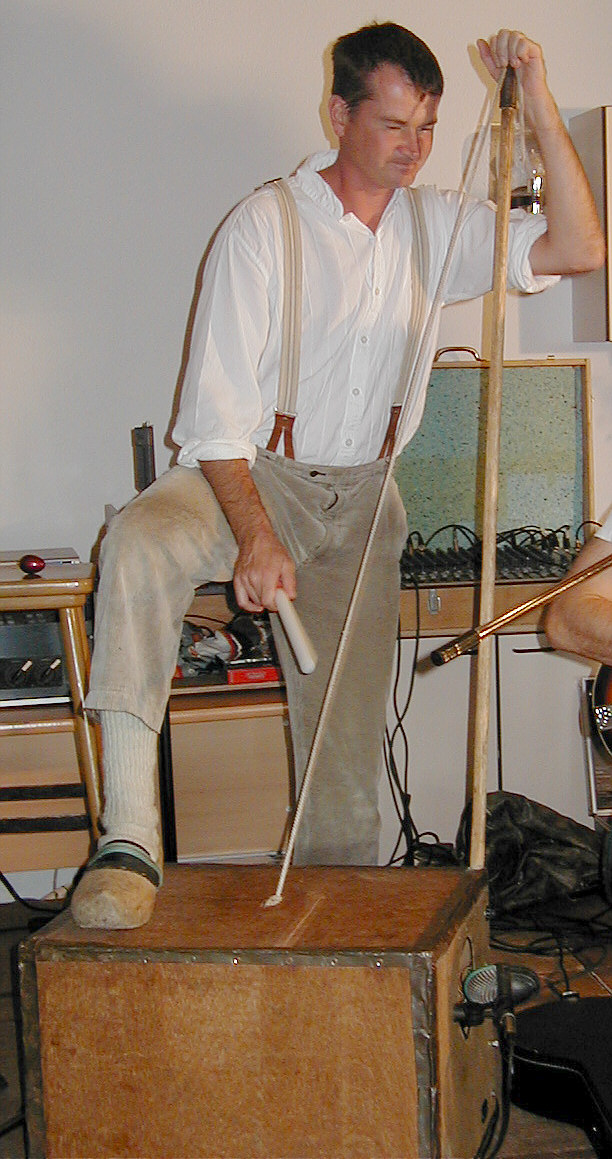
Tea chest bass

A tea chest bass is a variation of the washtub bass that uses a tea chest as the resonator for an upright stringed bass. The instrument is made from a pole, traditionally a broomstick, placed into or alongside the chest. One or more strings are stretched along the pole and plucked.

In Europe, particularly Britain and Germany, the instrument is associated with skiffle bands.

In Australia it was traditionally used to provide deep sounds for "bush bands", though most such groups today use electric bass or double bass. It is also known as bush bass or Tbox in Australia, and was used by the Northern Territory group the Mills Sisters.

== Other variations ==
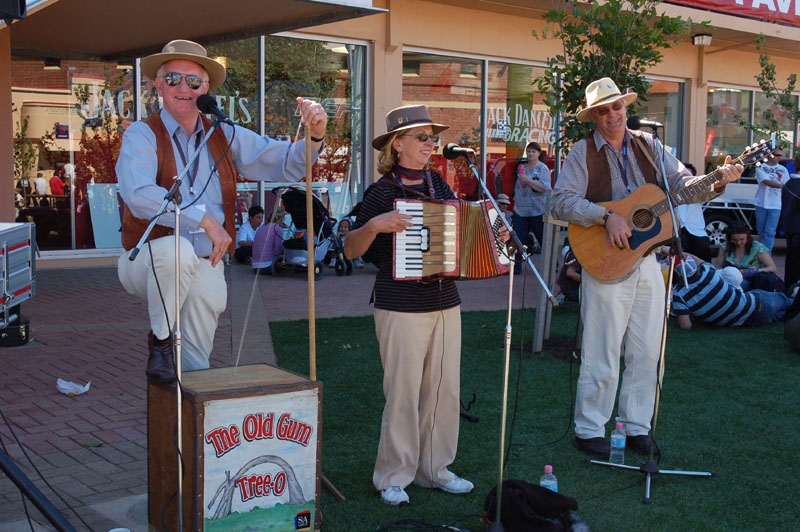
Australian bush band with tea chest bass player.

Other variations on the basic design are found around the world, particularly in the choice of resonator, for example:

- "gas-tank bass"
- "barrel bass"
- "box bass" (Trinidad)
- "bush bass" (Australia)
- "babatoni" (South Africa)
- "dumdum" (Zimbabwe)
- "dan bau" (Vietnam)
- "sanduku" (Zanzibar)
- "tanbou marengwen, in English, mosquito drum" (Haiti)
- "tingotalango" (Cuba)
- "tulòn" (Italy)

== Notable players ==
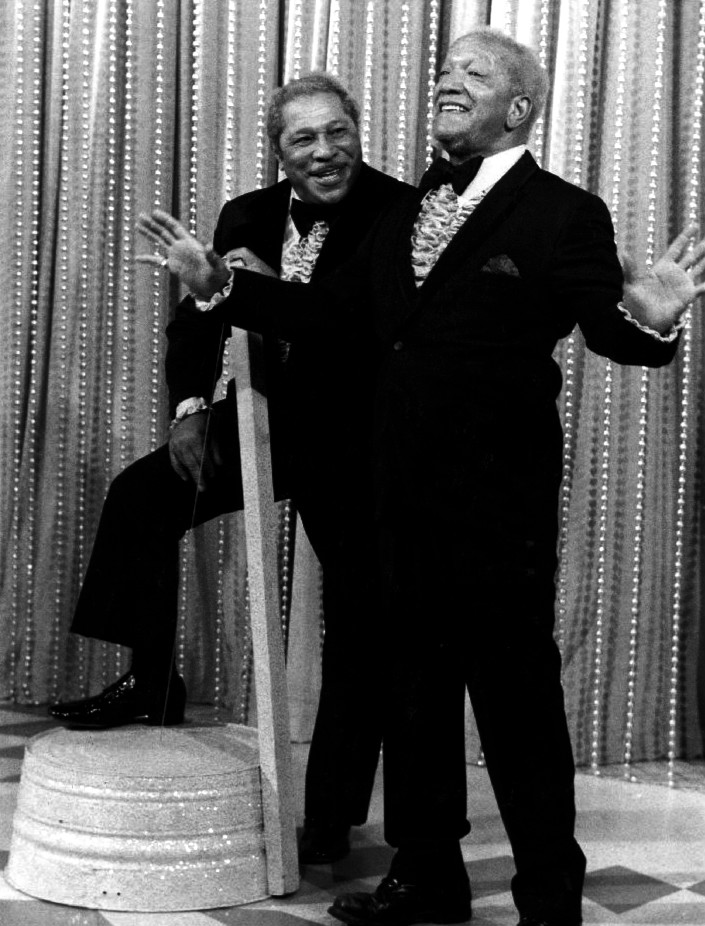
Don Bexley and Redd Foxx in episode of Sanford and Son

- Will Shade, vocalist and multi-instrumentalist member of the Memphis Jug Band who recorded from the 1920s until his death in 1966.
- Kansas Joe McCoy, washtub bass player and multi-instrumentalist, recorded with Arthur Crudup in 1941.
- Fritz Richmond (1939–2005) has performed on numerous recordings from America and Japan. One of his washtub basses is in the collection of the Smithsonian Institution.
- Donald Kachamba and Moya Aliya, one-string box players with the influential Malawi group Kachamba Brothers Band. Can be heard on "Donald Kachamba's Kwela Band", and "Malawi / Concert Kwela".
- Brian Ritchie, of the band The Violent Femmes, plays a 'tubless electric washtub bass'.
- Les Claypool, of Primus, often plays a variation called a whamola, as can be heard on the opening theme of the tenth season of South Park.
- Bill Smith, Len Garry, Ivan Vaughan, and Nigel Walley, tea-chest bass players of The Quarrymen.
- John Sanford, a.k.a. Redd Foxx, got his start in show business as washtub bass player for the "Bon Bons". In the Sanford and Son episode "Sanford and Gong" (aired December 17, 1976), Sanford and Don "Bubba" Bexley audition for The Gong Show with Bubba on washtub bass.
- Emmett Otter, a Muppet voiced by Jerry Nelson in Emmett Otter's Jug Band Christmas, puts a hole in his mother's washtub in order to make a washtub bass. He later performs with it in a talent show.
- Bob Weir and Mike Garbett played washtub bass on the eponymous album Mother McCree's Uptown Jug Champions – a forerunner band to Grateful Dead.
- Stu Cook, the bassist of Creedence Clearwater Revival, played washtub bass on the track "Poorboy Shuffle" from the album Willy and the Poor Boys. He faked playing the instrument to a recording of "Down on the Corner" on the ABC-TV variety show Music Scene, December 1, 1969.
- Lionel Kilberg (1930–2008), promoter and player of the 'Brownie Bass' with 'The Shanty Boys' during the folk music revival of the 1950s and 1960s in New York, and producer/lyricist/player of the 1973 album We Walked by the Water featuring Kate Wolf.
- That 1 Guy plays a variation of the washtub bass called the 'Magic Pipe' and a few other self-built instruments.
- Geoff Bell played the washtub bass for folk punk group Days N' Daze.
