= Erich Correns =

Erich Correns may refer to:

- Erich Correns (artist) (1821–1877), German portrait painter and lithographer
- Erich Correns (chemist) (1896–1981), German chemist and politician
