= Adam Darr =

German musician (1811–1866)

- Born: 29 September 1811; Schweinfurt
- Died: 2 October 1866, aged 55; Augsburg, Kingdom of Bavaria
- Occupation: Musician

Adam Darr (29 September 1811 – 2 October 1866) was a German classical guitarist, singer, zither player and composer.

== Biography ==
Adam Darr was born in Schweinfurt, Kingdom of Bavaria, and started playing the guitar as a youth. Sometime after the age of 23, he left his hometown of Schweinfurt, performing abroad. Although secondary sources state that he performed for royal courts, no primary sources have been discovered to verify this claim. The first known performance of Darr is in April 1837 as a guitarist/vocalist in an ensemble known as the Bavaria Nature-Singers. It is known that he traveled with this ensemble in Belgium, Denmark, Sweden, Finland, and Estonia. According to Bone (1914), he spent three years in St. Petersburg, Russia, from 1836 to 1839, after which he returned to Germany, where, in Würzburg, he became the private tutor of an English family resident there named Whitbread. It is believed that he performed in Paris, and it has been verified that he performed in Berlin. In Würzburg he met fellow-guitarist Friedrich Brand. Together they formed a duo and for a year or two, they traveled through southern Germany, performing in Munich, Weimar, and elsewhere. At Munich, Darr made the acquaintance of the Grand Duke of Bavaria's court zitherist Johann Petzmayer, who became his zither teacher. After five years of service to the Whitbread family, Darr ended his employment and in 1856 moved to Augsburg. In the last ten years of his life, Darr composed music for the guitar and zither, including songs. During this time he published many works for the zither including his famous method. In the last year of his life, Darr became depressed due to a marital engagement that was terminated, and on 2 October 1866 he committed suicide by drowning himself in the river Lech at Augsburg.

Darr was a prolific composer with over 300 known compositions to his name. Most of the known works by Darr are for the zither, he wrote more than 60 works for the guitar and also a respectable comic operetta for men's voices called Robinsonade. Most of Darr's works were not published in his lifetime, which makes dating his music almost impossible. Many manuscripts and most of the printed music is preserved at the Bavarian State Library (Fritz Walter and Gabriele Wiedemann Collection).

== Selected compositions ==
Guitar solo

- Andante religioso (Munich: Hauser, 1900)
- Galopp (Munich, 1907)
- Sonata: 3 movements published separately in Augsburg by the Freie Vereinigung zur Förderung guter Guitaremusik, 1908
- Mein letztes Andante (Augsburg, as above)

Guitar duo

- 15 numbered duos published in Augsburg by the Freie Vereinigung zur Förderung guter Guitaremusik (1905–8)
- Irenengalopp (Munich: Gitarristische Vereinigung, 1911)

Zither

- Olga-Walzer (Trier: Hoenes, c.1903)

== Recordings ==
- Adam Darr: Romantic German Guitar Duets, performed by John Schneiderman and Hideki Yamaya (guitars). Profil DCD PH13052, CD (2014). Contains: Introduktion & Polonaise; Erinnerung an St. Petersburg; Serenade; Irenengalopp; Introduktion & Rondo; Trauer-Marsch; Einleitung & Walzer; Grosses Adagio und Rondo; duos no. 1 to 14.
- Gitarrenmusik der deutschen Romantik, performed by David Silvan Weiss (guitar). Vitula, CD [no catalogue number] (2014). Contains: Sonata in D major.
- Fogli d'album, performed by Alberto La Rocca (10-string guitar), CD GuitArt 10/2015. It contains: Rondino; Andante no. 1; Andante no. 3; Mein letztes Andante.

== Bibliography ==
- Philip J. Bone: The Guitar and Mandolin. Biographies of Celebrated Players and Composers for these Instruments (London: Schott & Co. and Augener Ltd., 1914; 2nd edition, 1954), p. 90–91.
- Fritz Stang: "Adam Darr. Gedanken zum 125. Todestag", in: Saitenspiel, January 1992, p. 11–14. English translation by Jane Curtis available here.
- Joseph Richard Costello: Adam Darr (1811–1866). The Career and Works of a German Romantic Guitarist and Zitherist (unpublished dissertation, Arizona State University, 2005).
