= Erich Correns (artist) =

German painter and lithographer

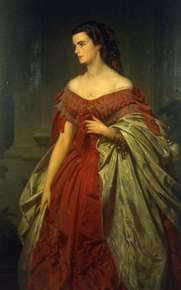
Duchess Helene in Bavaria, 1859

Erich Correns (1821–1877) was a German portrait painter and lithographer.

== Life ==
Correns was born at Cologne in 1821, and after studying jurisprudence at Bonn, went to the Academy at Munich, and became an accomplished portrait painter and lithographer. He was well known for the elegance of his portraits, his subjects including King Maximilian of Bavaria and his consort Queen Maria.

He died at Munich in 1877.

The botanist and geneticist Carl Erich Correns was his son.

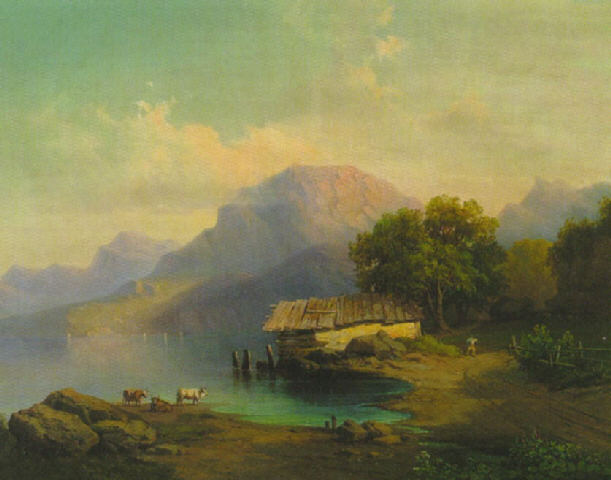
Fishing house at the shore of the Gebirgssee, 1859

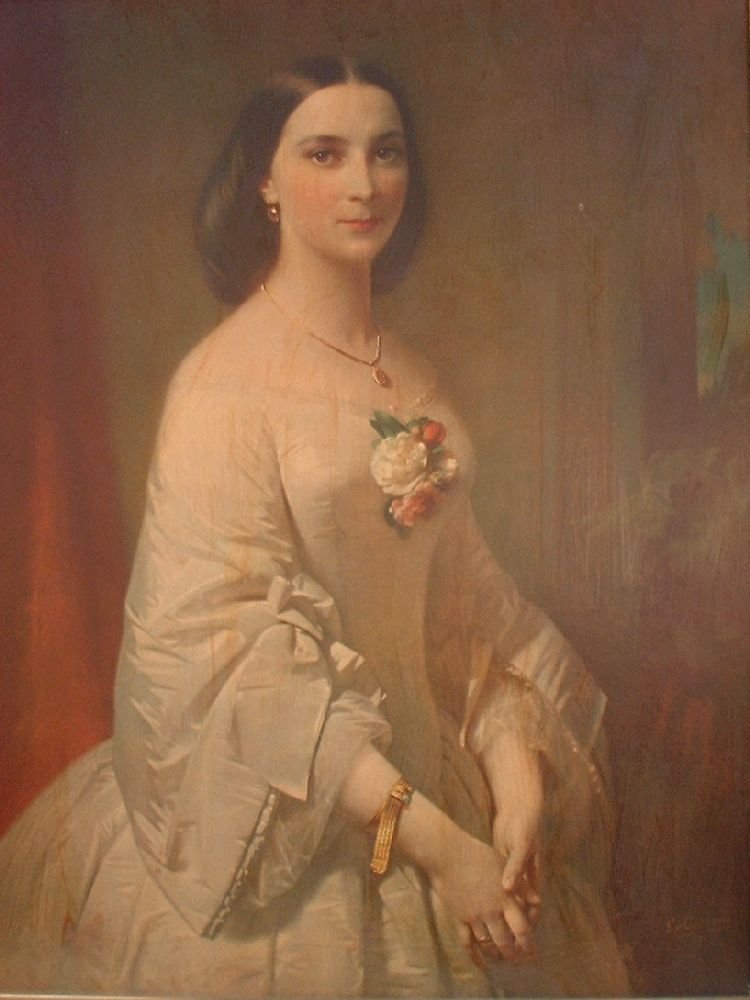
Southern belle, ca. 1850

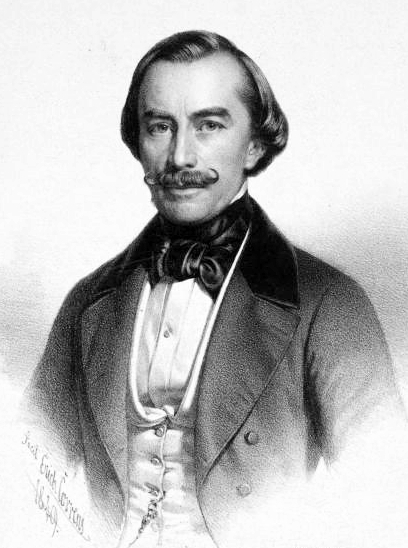
Johann Petzmayer, Austrian zither player and composer, lithograph from 1849

== See also ==
- List of German painters
