= Zither =

Class of stringed musical instruments

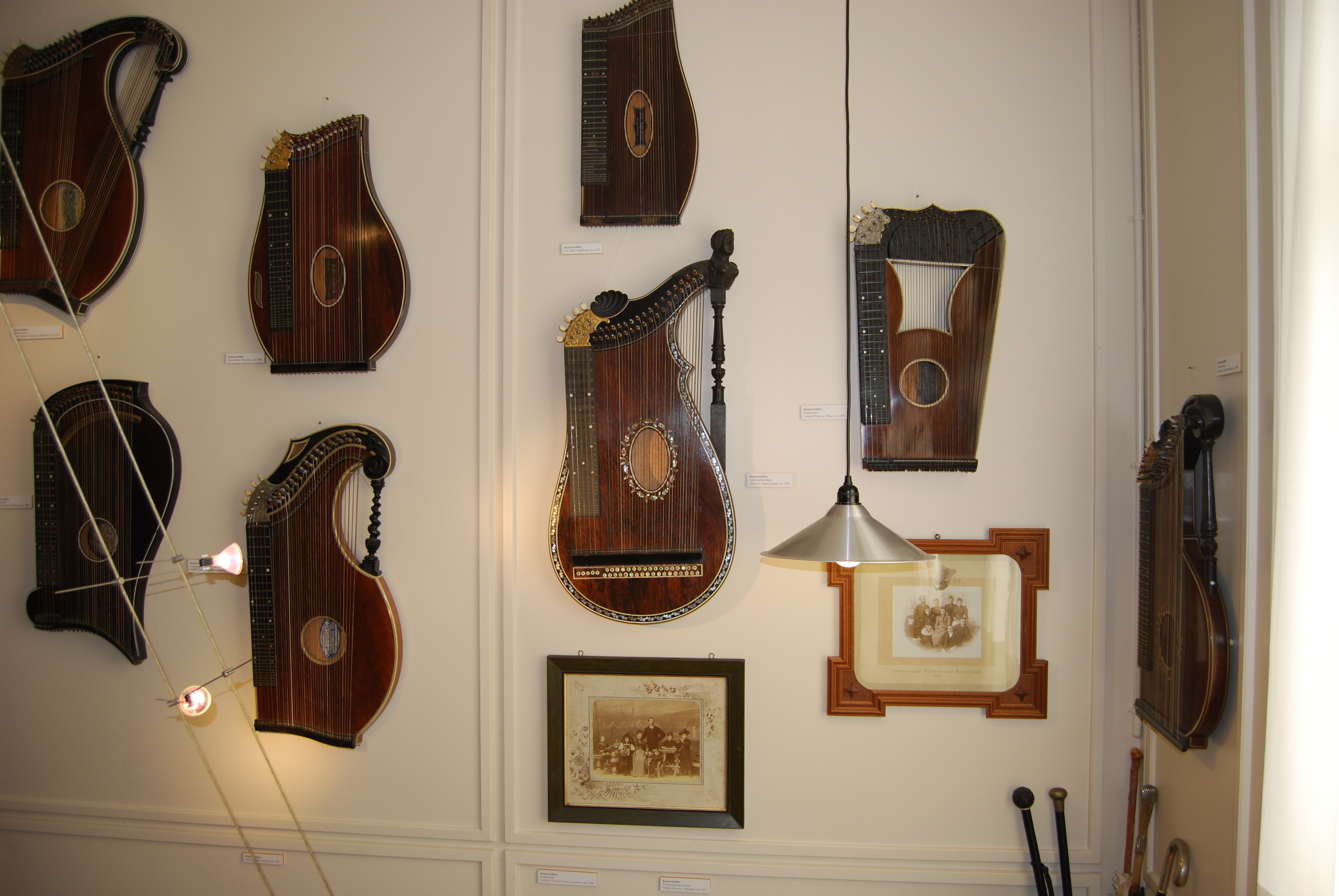
- Different concert zithers

String instrument
- Classification: (Chordophone), String instrument
- Hornbostel–Sachs classification: 314.122-5,6 (Resonated box zither, plucked by fingers or a plectrum)
- Developed: Antiquity

Related instruments
- Bar zither or stick zither, musical bow, tube zither, raft zither, board zither, box zither, ground zither, harp zither, trough zither, frame zither

Sound sample
- Zither solo from G'schichten aus dem Wienerwald (1:04)

Zither (/ˈzɪð.ər, ˈzɪθ.-/; German: [ˈtsɪtɐ], from the Greek κιθάρα, cithara) is a class of stringed instruments, and the term also refers to a specific subset of instruments of the zither class, most usually the concert or Alpine zithers. The modern instrument has many strings stretched across a thin, flat body.

Zithers are typically played by strumming or plucking the strings with the fingers or a plectrum. In the Hornbostel–Sachs classification system, the term refers to a larger family of similarly shaped instruments that also includes the hammered dulcimer family and piano and a few rare bowed instruments like the bowed psaltery, bowed dulcimer, and streichmelodion. Like an acoustic guitar or lute, a zither's body serves as a resonating chamber (sound box), but, unlike guitars and lutes, a zither lacks a distinctly separate neck assembly. The number of strings varies, from one to more than fifty.

In modern usage, the term "zither" usually refers to three specific instruments: the concert zither (German: Konzert‌zither), its variant the Alpine zither (each of which uses a fretted fingerboard), and the chord zither (more recently described as a fretless zither or "guitar zither").

Concert and Alpine zithers are traditionally found in Slovenia, Austria, Hungary, France, north-western Croatia, the southern regions of Germany, Alpine Europe, Poland, the Czech Republic, Slovakia, Russia, Ukraine and Belarus. Emigration from these areas during the 19th century introduced the concert and Alpine zither to North and South America. Chord zithers similar to the instrument in the photograph also became popular in North America during the late 19th and early 20th centuries. These variants all use metal strings, similar to the cittern.

== Etymology ==
The word "zither" is derived from Latin cythara, which was used in this form for the title covers on many 16th- and 17th-century German-printed manuscript books originally for the 'cittern' – from the Greek word kithara, an instrument used in Ancient Greece.

The German scholar Michael Praetorius mentions an Englishman who came to Germany with a small cittern, einem kleinen Citterlein, in his treatise Syntagma Musicum, published during the early 17th century. It is not fully understood how "zitter" or "zither" came to be applied to the instruments in this article as well as German varieties of the cittern.

Other types of zither also existed in Germany, mostly drone zithers like the scheitholt (which was mentioned by Praetorius) or hummel, but these generally have their own individual regional names and may have been in use before the introduction into the lexicon of 'cythara' and its German derivative cognate.

== Organology ==
The Hornbostel–Sachs system, an academic instrument classification method, also uses the term zither to classify all stringed instruments in which the strings do not extend beyond the sounding box. Categories include Bar zithers (made up of musical bows and stick zithers), tube zithers, raft zithers, board zithers (includes box zithers, ground zithers and harp zithers), trough zithers and frame zithers.

According to Sachs:

Board-zithers form the most important category from an occidental point of view because they include our stringed keyboard instruments. The strings are stretched out over a board, which is rectangular or trapezoidal or in some other shape, and which is glued onto a shallow box.

The strings may be open or stopped, it may be a psaltery or a dulcimer.

This includes such diverse instruments as the hammered dulcimer, psaltery, Appalachian dulcimer, guqin, guzheng, tromba marina, koto, gusli, kanun, kanklės, kantele, kannel, kokles, valiha, gayageum, geomungo, ajaeng, đàn tranh, autoharp, santoor, yangqin, santur, swarmandal, and others. Pedal steel guitars, lap guitars (where the neck serves no separate function other than to extend the string length), and keyboard instruments like the clavichord, harpsichord and piano also fall within this broad categorical use.

The word has also been used in conjunction with brand varieties of other string instruments, for example, the zither banjo.

== History and development ==
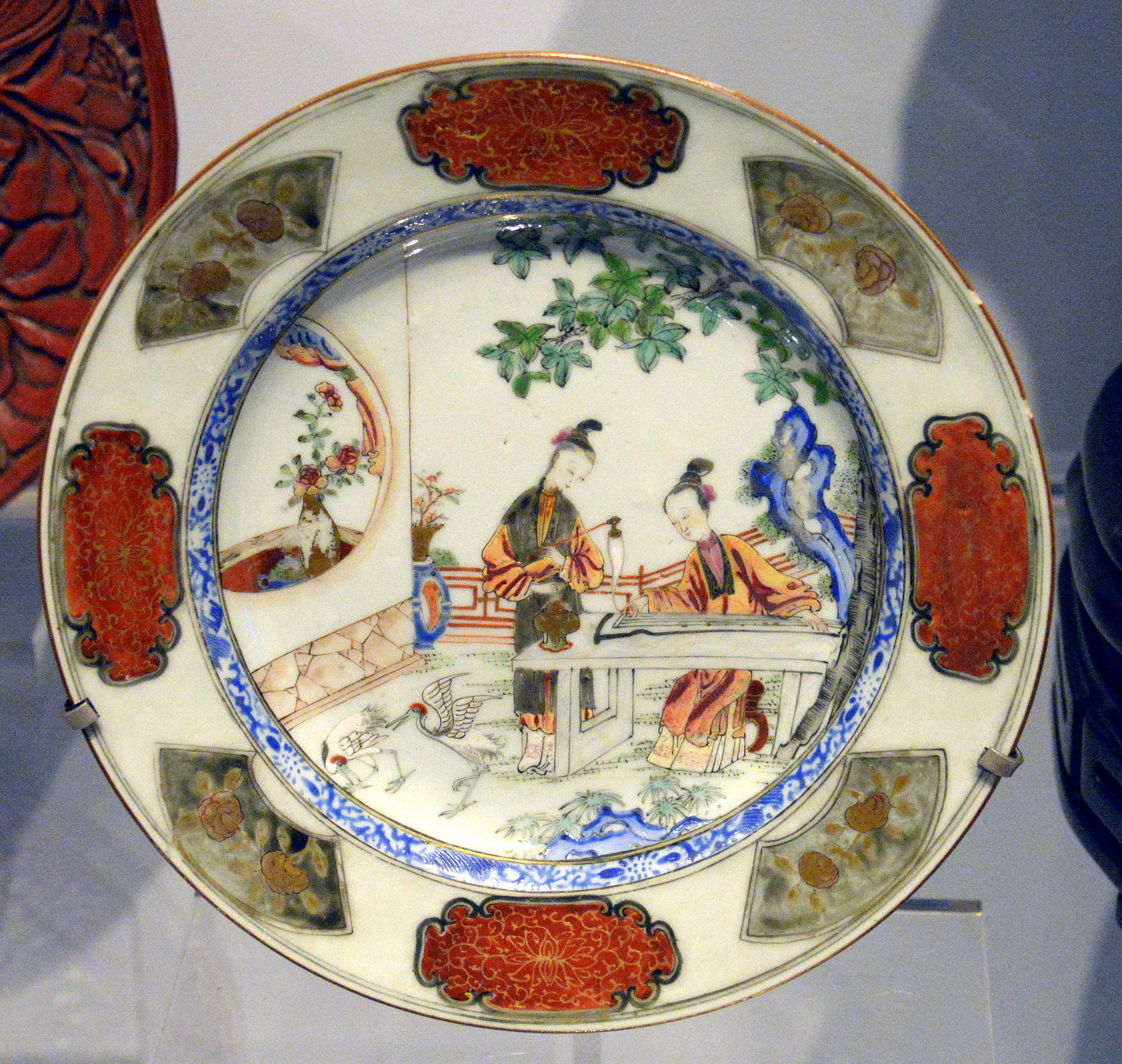
Plate. The Romance of the Western Chamber. In a scene from a popular play, the heroine is shown in contemplation, playing her zither. From China, Qing Dynasty, 18th century CE. National Museum of Scotland, Edinburgh

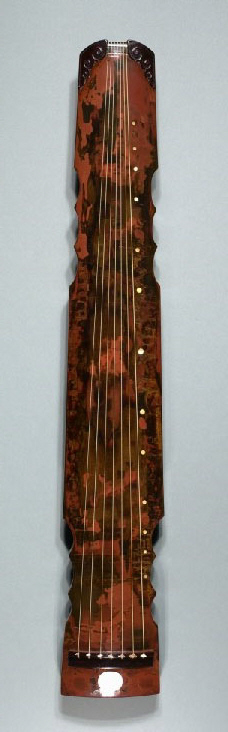
Chinese guqin with seven strings

The earliest known surviving instrument of the zither family is a Chinese guqin, a fretless instrument, found in the tomb of Marquis Yi of Zeng, dating from 433 BC. Similar instruments along this design were developed over the following centuries, for example, the Japanese silk-strung koto; the siter of Indonesian gamelans; the qānūn (or kanun) of Greece and the Middle East; the valiha, a tube zither of Madagascar; and many others. Increasing interest in "world music" has brought wider recognition to these other zither family members, both ancient and modern. Many of these instruments have been sampled electronically and are available in instrument banks for music synthesizers.

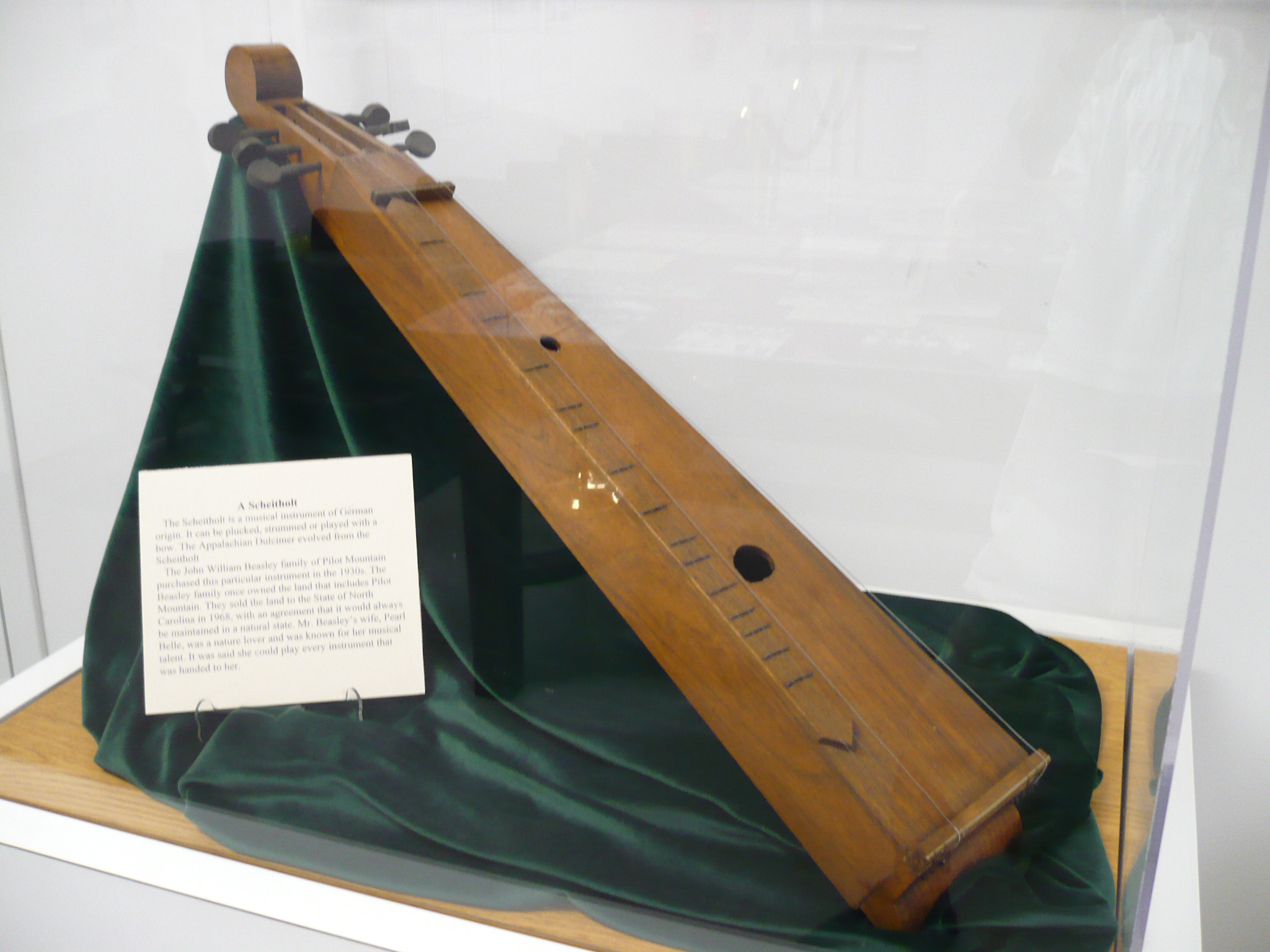
Alpine Scheitholt

In Europe and other more northern and western regions, early zithers were more similar to the modern mountain dulcimer, having long, usually rectangular, sound boxes, with one or more melody strings and several unfretted drone strings. Some of these employed movable bridges similar to the Japanese koto, used for retuning the drone strings. The Alpine Scheitholt furnishes an example of this older type of European zither. By the late 18th century, two principal varieties of European concert zither had developed, known as the Salzburg zither (with a rounded side away from the player), and the Mittenwald zither (with both sides rounded). Both styles are still found in concert zithers today, although the Salzburg style has become by far the most common.

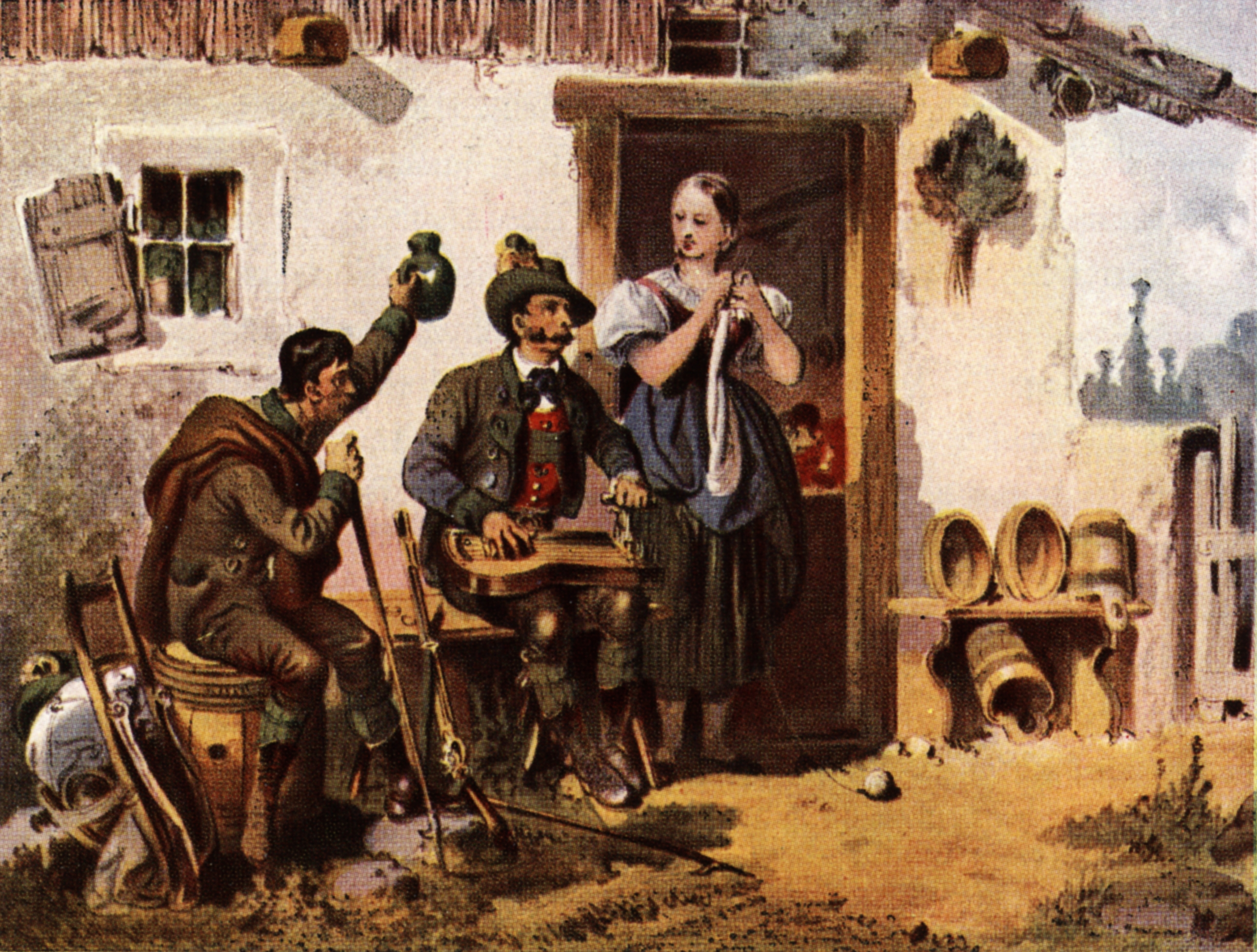
Zitherist before 1850 in Ausseerland, Styria, playing a Salzburg-style instrument

The zither became a popular folk music instrument in Bavaria and Austria and, at the beginning of the 19th century, was known as a Volkszither.

Viennese zitherist Johann Petzmayer (1803–1884) became one of the outstanding virtuosi on these early instruments and is credited with making the zither a household instrument. In 1838, Nikolaus Weigel of Munich conceived the idea of adopting fixed bridges, adding additional strings, tuning them in the cycle of fifths, and chromatically fretting the fingerboard – effectively converting a rather crude folk instrument into the concert zither. His ideas were not, however, widely accepted until 1862, when luthier Max Amberger of Munich fabricated a new zither based on Weigel's design. At this point the zither had reached something very close to its modern concert form. Within a relatively short time the new design had largely replaced the old Volkszither (though still called by the same name among folk musicians) throughout central Europe, particularly in the Alpine countries. As the 'concert zither' it also began to attract the attention of serious composers, a number of whom, themselves, became concert zither virtuosi. These composers, called the "Altmeister", flourished between 1870 and 1910. And no less a composer than Johann Strauss II gave the instrument a prominent solo in one of his most famous waltzes, "Tales from the Vienna Woods". (Note: The part is sometimes played on a mandolin, when a zither is not available. Lorin Maazel played the part on the violin at a New Year's Day concert in Vienna.)

The zither went through two periods of great popularity in the United States. The first of these was in the late 19th through early 20th century, when it was greatly in vogue as a parlour instrument in many homes. During that period, a number of U.S.-based instrument manufacturers, many of them founded by, or staffed with, European (and especially German and Austrian) luthiers, were producing concert zithers. Chord zithers were often marketed under confusing brand names like 'guitar zither' or 'mandoline zither'. The recently rediscovered recordings of the gospel singer Washington Phillips, who used two instruments simultaneously, have revealed the virtuosic capability of the chord zither to modern musicians seeking to revive it. By the 1920s, this popularity had begun to wane, as other string instruments (notably guitars) increased in popularity along with the new fashion for jazz music.

In the 1950s, interest in zithers resurfaced due in great measure to the success of the 1949 British film noir The Third Man. The soundtrack music for the film, which featured only a concert zither (no other instruments) – was performed by the Viennese musician Anton Karas. His "The Third Man Theme" was released as a single in 1949–50 and became a best-seller in the UK. Following its release in the U.S. in 1950, it spent eleven weeks at number one on Billboard's U.S. Best Sellers in Stores Chart from 29 April to 8 July. The exposure made Karas an international star. A Time magazine film preview stated that "the famous musical score by Anton Karas" would have the audience "in a dither with his zither".

This new popularity for the zither lasted until well into the 1960s with many successful albums during the period from performers such as Karas, Ruth Welcome, and Shirley Abicair. German-born American Ruth Welcome released a number of very popular theme-based zither albums between 1958 and 1965 (e.g., Romantic Zither; Zither South of the Border; Zither Goes to Hollywood). Australian-born singer Shirley Abicair popularised the chord zither when she used it for accompaniment in her TV shows, live performances and recordings in Britain in the 1950s and '60s. Zither music also featured in a Twilight Zone episode – Mr Bevis in 1960.

Although interest in the zither had once more begun to wane by the late 1960s, owing to the two American vogues there are still many used instruments to be found, in various states of disrepair. It has become something of a truism that most zithers seen today are either 60 or 110 years old. Currently (2019) only a few independent luthiers and mid-European makers are producing new instruments.

== Concert and Alpine zithers ==
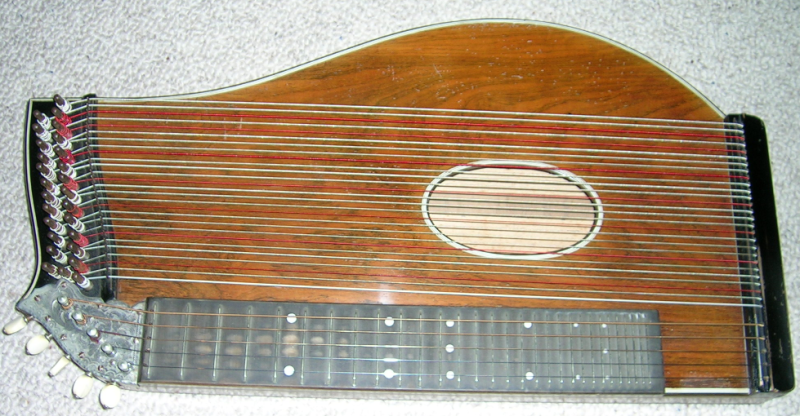
Concert zither with a fretted fingerboard. This variety is a discant Salzburger Konzertzither.

A concert zither may have from 29 to 38 strings, with 34 or 35 being most typical. These are arranged as follows: four or five fretted melody strings, placed above a guitar-like fretboard; 12 unfretted "accompaniment" strings; followed by 12 unfretted "bass" strings; followed by a varying number of "contrabass" strings, with five or six being the most common number.

On some older zithers, one may find "half-frets" above the 12th fret, which extend only under the first two or three strings. This results in the lower fretted strings having no pitches (or no chromatic pitches) available above the 12th fret, while the higher fretted strings still have higher chromatic pitches available at these half-frets. Nearly all instruments made after 1960, however, have full-length frets all the way up the fretboard.

Anton Karas and Ruth Welcome used instruments of similar design to the one illustrated. After World War II, Karas (according to zither scholar Günter Wittenstein, who was acquainted with him) performed on an instrument of larger dimensions than normal – with a 43 cm standard scale length for the fingerboard strings. He used Viennese tuning (see below), but with an altered chromatic sequence for the fingerboard and open strings. The accompaniment strings G and F♯ were tuned an octave higher, while contrabass strings tuned E♭, F, D, E, C♯ replaced the regular cycle of fifths bass strings. This brought the contrabasses closer to the fingerboard where the player could reach them more easily.

For The Third Man, Karas tuned the zither a semi-tone lower, giving a particularly distinctive tone to the contrabass strings. The resulting lower string tension also enabled Karas to perform an expressive vibrato on the fingerboard melody strings. Film director Carol Reed, (on whose oak kitchen table the music was performed), described the sound as "gritty and dirty", perfectly reflecting the atmospheric mood of the film.

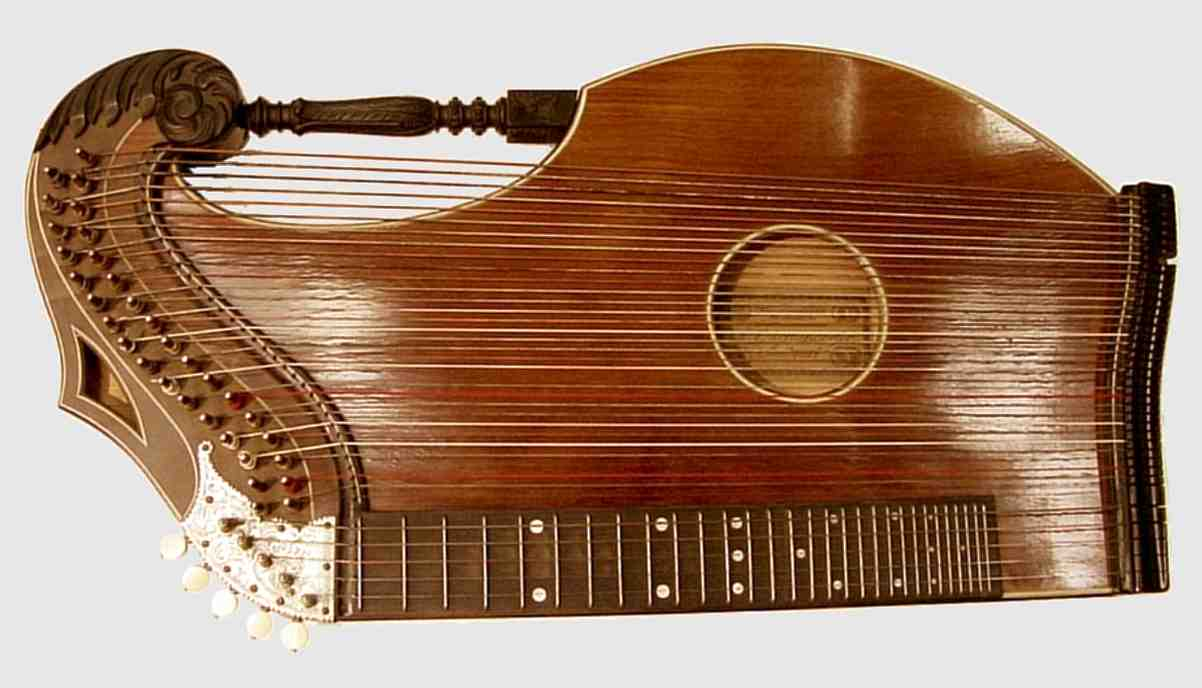
An Alpine Zither. Note the "harp post" at the top of the image.

The Alpine zither has 42 strings, and differs from the concert zither primarily in requiring the addition of an extension to the body of the instrument to support both the longer additional contrabass strings and their tuners.

Alpine zithers are tuned in a similar manner to the concert zither, with the accompaniment and bass strings each providing a full set of 12 chromatic pitches also arranged in a cycle of fifths. Contrabass strings are arranged in a descending chromatic scale. Late 19th and early 20th century versions of the instrument were often called 'harp zithers' – so-named because the pillar extension seemed a miniature version of the harp's pillar. The extra contrabass strings ran parallel to the other strings on these earlier instruments, the diagonal arrangement illustrated developed later to assist the right hand in reaching the strings.

There are two popular tunings for the modern zither: Munich and Viennese. The zither tuning chart below gives tuning details, including pitches and octaves. Munich tuning is on top, and Vienna tuning below. Some players have used Vienna tuning only for the fretted strings, and Munich tuning for the unfretted strings. Full Viennese tuning is normally used only on instruments with 38 or fewer strings. However Optima makes strings to allow for "Extended Viennese Tuning" w/ 42 strings going all the way down to C#1 (the same note on the 2nd fret of the 5th string on a 5 string bass).

== Tuning ==
Tuning chart for concert and Alpine zithers:

Zither tuning chart
		Fretted					Unfretted																																				
String		Melody					Accompaniment												Basses												Contrabasses												
String		1	2	3	4	5	6	7	8	9	10	11	12	13	14	15	16	17	18	19	20	21	22	23	24	25	26	27	28	29	30	31	32	33	34	35	36	37	38	39	40	41	42
Pitch	Munich	A_{4}	A_{4}	D_{4}	G_{3}	C_{3}	E♭_{4}	B♭_{3}	F_{4}	C_{4}	G_{3}	D_{4}	A_{3}	E_{4}	B_{3}	F♯_{3}	C♯_{4}	G♯_{3}	E♭_{3}	B♭_{2}	F_{3}	C_{3}	G_{2}	D_{3}	A_{2}	E_{3}	B_{2}	F♯_{2}	C♯_{3}	G♯_{2}	F_{2}	E_{2}	E♭_{2}	D_{2}	C♯_{2}	C_{2}	B_{1}	B♭_{1}	A_{1}	G♯_{1}	G_{1}	F♯_{1}	F_{1}
Pitch	Viennese (extended)	A_{4}	D_{4}	G_{4}	G_{3}	C_{3}	A♭_{4}	E♭_{4}	B♭_{3}	F_{4}	C_{4}	G_{4}	D_{4}	A_{3}	E_{4}	B_{3}	F♯_{4}	C♯_{4}	G♯_{3}	E♭_{2}	B♭_{2}	F_{2}	C_{3}	G_{2}	D_{2}	A_{2}	E_{2}	B_{2}	F♯_{2}	C♯_{2}	G♯_{2}	C_{2}	B_{1}	B♭_{1}	A_{1}	G♯_{1}	G_{1}	F♯_{1}	F_{1}	E_{1}	D♯_{1}	D_{1}	C♯_{1}
Notes:		Basic																													Concert						Alpine						

The C#, F, & A strings of the unfretted string section on the fretted zither are colored red; like the red C strings & blue/black F strings of a harp, they act as "separator strings" to give the musician useful reference points when playing. In Extended Munich Tuning, there can be 4 more chromatically tuned contrabass strings tuned to E1, Eb1, D1, & Db1 (the Low Db1 is the same note as on the 3rd fret of the 5th string on a 5 string bass). The fretboard strings can also be tuned A4, D4, G3, C3, F3 thanks to the Optima fretboard F3 zither string.

== Playing techniques ==
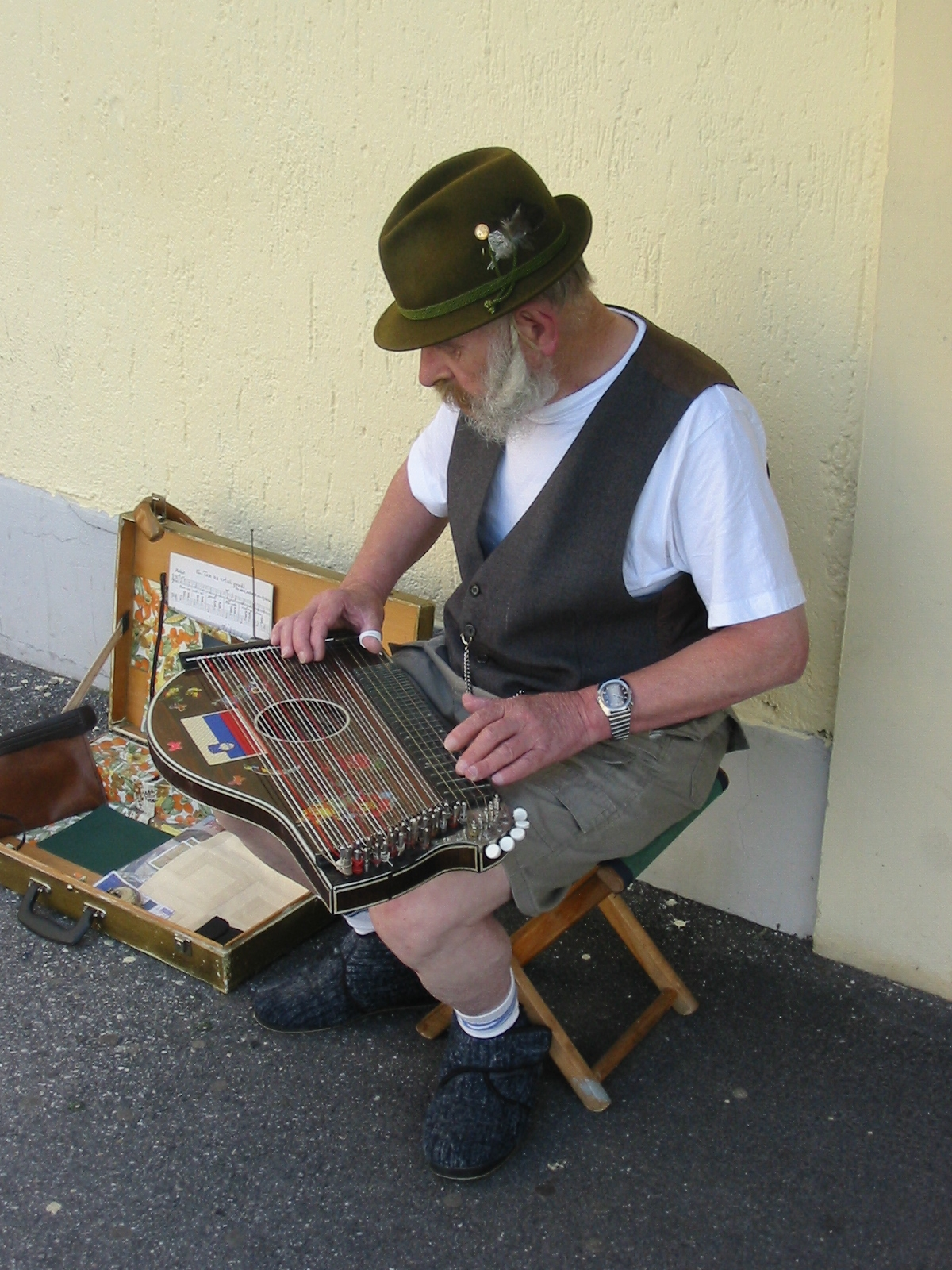
Zitherist in Maribor, Slovenia

The zither is played by plucking the strings while it lies flat on a table (which acts as a resonator to amplify the sound), or it can be held on the lap.

On concert and Alpine zithers, the melody strings are pressed to the fingerboard ("fretted") with the fingers of the left hand, and plucked with a plectrum on the right thumb. The first and second fingers of the right hand pluck the accompaniment and bass strings, and the third finger of the right hand plucks the contrabass strings (there are variants on this technique), some musicians use Plectrums on the other 4 fingers too so they can strike the accompaniment strings more easily & get a sharper attack.

The concept of the chord zither is different from that of the concert and alpine zithers. These instruments may have from 12 to 50 (or more) strings, depending on design. All the strings are played open, in the manner of a harp. The strings on the left are arranged in groups of three or four, which form various chords to be played by the left hand. The strings to the right are single (or pairs of) strings intended for the right hand to pick out the melody. Tuning can vary widely from manufacturer to manufacturer and even from model to model, but is usually indicated on the instrument itself, in the form of a chart painted or glued under the strings.

== Contemporary use ==
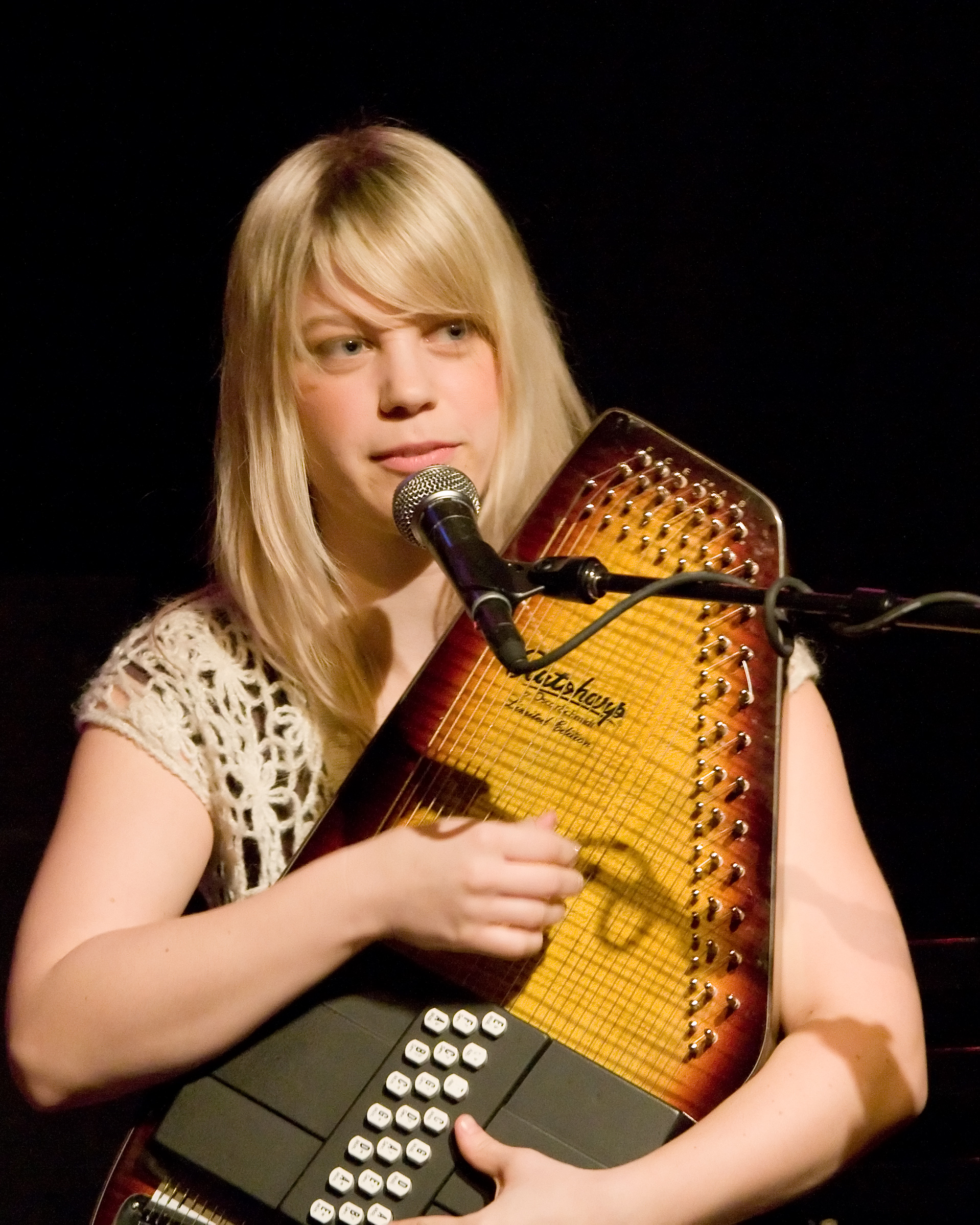
Basia Bulat playing an autoharp

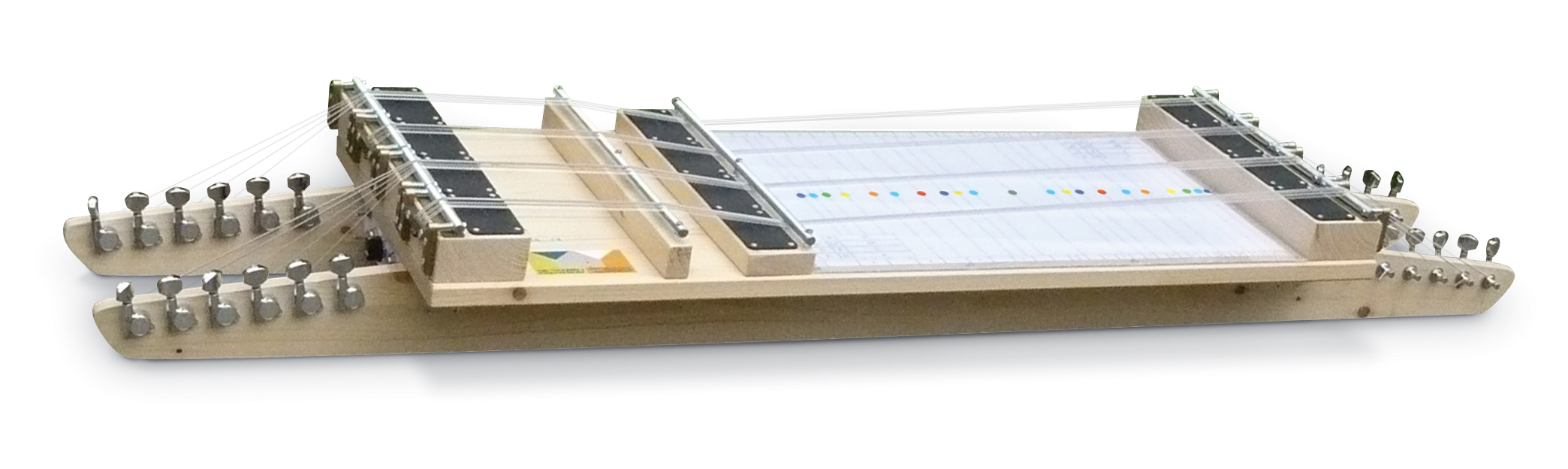
Liam Finn's electric drum zither

Since the zither requires advanced technique to play anything more than simple tunes, the vast majority of the concert zithers sold never attained more than amateur or (mostly) ornamental use; the playing of Washington Phillips was a rare exception.

As a result, manufacturers attempted to simplify the instrument with various keyboard devices attached to the melody strings (Marxophone, dolceola, celestaphone, tremoloa etc.). The invention of the autoharp, which uses bars with felt pads attached underneath placed across and above the strings, is probably the most successful adaptation. However, the absence of a fretboard makes the autoharp a closer relative of the chord zither than the concert zither. Presence of the concert zither in classical music remains sparse.

Concert and Alpine zithers remain in use by a relatively small number of contemporary musicians from various global regions and musical genres, either out of interest in traditional musical styles for the instrument, or from a desire to seek new sounds for their music. One notable exception is the contemporary zither duo Liab und Schneid consisting of Tom Leoni and Elisabeth Lloyd, who tour and perform traditional Alpine music, classical music (including arrangements of chamber music by Mozart and Haydn), and original compositions.

New variations on the concert zither have also been employed, including the electric zither—and recent instruments that share zither characteristics, such as the Chapman stick.

While use of the concert zither itself has declined, zither music and technique continue to influence contemporary musicians. For example: Canadian musician Jeff Healey, featured in the film thriller Road House in 1989, used a zither technique to play electric guitar. Blind from the age of one, Healey began playing when he was three with the instrument flat on his lap, left hand above the fingerboard in the same manner as a zitherist Although he used a Fender Stratocaster guitar throughout his career, the instrument was in effect being used as an electric zither.

== Notable players ==
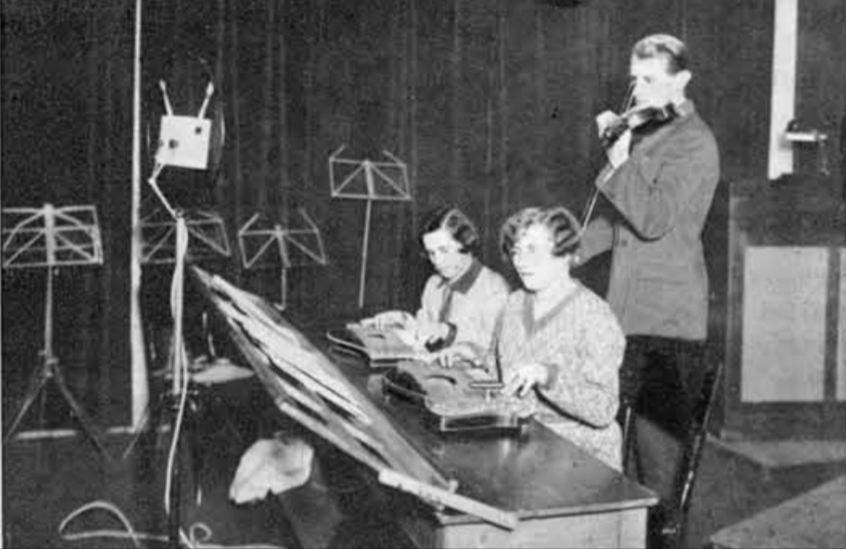
Slovenian zither player Dragica Legat Košmerl (centre) performing with a trio on Radio Ljubljana in 1929

- Shirley Abicair (1928–2025) – noted Australian zitherist, singer, actress, and author
- Dorothy Carter (1935–2003) – American zitherist and multi-instrumentalist, specialized in Medieval folk and experimental music
- Anton Karas (1906–1985) – Austrian zitherist and composer, composer of the soundtrack for the movie "The Third Man"
- Félix Lajkó (b. 1974) – Hungarian violinist, zitherist, and composer
- Laraaji (b. 1943) – American multi-instrumentalist, composer, ambient zitherist, and mystic
- Dragica Legat Košmerl (1883–1956) – Slovenian zither player, zither teacher, and composer
- Tom Leoni (b. 1966) – Swiss born, US based zitherist and composer, performs as half of the duo Liab und Schneid (see Elizabeth Lloyd)
- Elizabeth Lloyd – Swiss born, US based zitherist and composer, perform as half of the duo Liab und Schneid (see Tom Leoni)
- Adolf Maurer (1883–1976) – Swiss-German zitherist, teacher, conductor, and early promoter of the zither in the U.S.
- Johann Petzmayer (1803–1884) – Austrian composer and touring zitherist
- Washington Phillips (1880–1954) – American Gospel and blues singer, and guitar zitherist
- Wilfried Scharf (b. 1955) – Austrian zitherist, zither professor at the Anton Bruckner Private University for Music, Drama, and Dance in Linz, since 1989
- Franz Schwarzer (1828–1904) – "The King of Zither Manufacturers", founded one of the first large zither companies in the US, in Missouri in 1866
- Ruth Welcome (1919–2005) – German born American zitherist; America's only professional zitherist from 1945 to 1975
- Henry Wormsbacher (1866–1934) – German born classical zitherist, president of the American Zither Verband, leading promoter of the concert zither in America

== See also ==
- Adjalin – Zither native to Benin
- Baltic psaltery – a family of plucked box zithers
- Celestaphone – Zither with sprung hammers
- Spitzharfe – 18th century table-top zither
- Tautirut – Bowed zither native to the Inuit culture of Canada
- Ukelin – American bowed zither
- Violinharp – Bowed zither
