= Ruth Welcome =

German-born American zither player (1918–2005)

- Born: April 24, 1919; Germany
- Died: March 6, 2005 (aged 85) Peoria, AZ
- Genres: Easy Listening, Light Jazz
- Occupations: Musician, Recording Artist
- Instrument: Zither
- Years active: 1953–1975
- Label: Capitol

Ruth Anneliese Welcome (April 24, 1919 – March 6, 2005) was a German-born American zither player. During her 30-year career (1945-1975) she distinguished herself as America's only professional zitherist, and, as a recording artist for Capitol Records, producing 18 albums and several singles.

== Background and career ==
Welcome learned to play zither as a child, and was familiar with the instrument at age 8, when in 1927, her family emigrated to the United States and settled in New York City. There she took lessons on piano and zither, and upon graduation from high school she was accepted at the Juilliard School of Music, where she studied piano and violin; she later taught piano at the School for several years.

During the second world war she joined the USO and entertained troops overseas, finding the zither more portable than the piano, and more suitable for solo work than the violin. After the war she continued to volunteer in military hospitals for several years.

In 1949 Anton Karas' theme music for the British film noir The Third Man had a vogue in the United States, and reintroduced the sound of the zither to an American public which hadn't paid it much notice since the turn of the previous century. The popularity of Karas' zither-based score helped set the stage for Welcome's professional debut as a zitherist, in 1953. Her performance, in Manhattan's famous Hampshire House, was well-received, and she became a regular attraction there for the next five years.

At the end of her run at the Hampshire House, Welcome took her zither on the road, touring the US and Canada with such success, that Capitol Records signed her to an exclusive recording contract that same year (1957). She recorded eighteen zither albums for Capitol, which became popular all over the world, and started something of a "zither revival" in North America. A number of manufacturers began producing concert zithers again in such numbers that today (2016) if you buy a used zither it is most likely to come either from the period 1895-1910, or from 1955-1965.

Her first album, Hi-Fi-Zither, was released in 1958, and over the next fifteen years she recorded seventeen zither albums for Capitol, as well as a number of singles. Her repertory consisted primarily of standards and showtunes, in a style that came to be known as "mood music" or "easy listening" in the mid-1960s.

Welcome retired from touring and recording in 1975, and relocated from Connecticut to Sun City, Arizona, where she spent most of the remainder of her life. She died in Peoria, Arizona, on March 6, 2005, and is buried in Sunland Memorial Park.

During her career, Welcome recorded more zither albums than any other zither player. While the zither has again waned in popularity since the 1960s, Welcome's albums continue to sell briskly as collector's items, and several have been re-released on CD. In 2013 the Guardian released an article noting the continued popularity of her music on online sharing services such as Spotify.

== Discography ==
Albums

Title	Format	Label	Issue Number	Date of Issue
Ruth Welcome, Dick Marta - Cafe Continental	LP?	Cook Laboratories, Inc.	10326	1950
Hi-Fi Zither	LP, Album, Mono	Capitol Records	T-942	1958
Third Man Theme and other Zither Hits	LP, Album	Capitol Records	DT-942	1958
Third Man Theme And Other Zither Hits	(LP, Album, RE	Capitol Records	SM-942	1958?
Zither Magic	LP, Album, Mono	Capitol Records	T-1279	1959
Zither Magic	LP, Album, Stereo	Capitol Records	ST-1279	1959
Welcome To Zitherland	LP, Album, Mono	Capitol Records	T-1471	1960
Welcome To Zitherland	LP, Album, Stereo	Capitol Records	ST-1471	1960
Ruth Welcome and the Buffalo Zither Club	LP, Album, Stereo	F&B		1960?
Zither South Of The Border	LP, Album, Mono	Capitol Records	C-80204	1960
Zither South Of The Border	LP, Album, Mono	Capitol Records, Codiscos Mundial	C-80204, T-1397	1960
Zither South Of The Border	LP, Album, Mono	Capitol Records	T-1397	1960
Zither South Of The Border	LP, Album, Stereo	Capitol Records	ST 1397	1960
Zither In Three Quarter Time	LP, Album, Mono	Capitol Records	T 1318	1960
Romantic Zither	LP, Mono	Capitol Records	T-1527	1961
Romantic Zither	LP, Album, Mono	Capitol Records	T 1527, T-1527	Unknown
Romantic Zither	LP, Album, Stereo	Capitol Records	ST 1527	Unknown
Ruth Welcome And Klaus Ogerman's Orchestra - Carnival	LP, Album, Stereo	Capitol Records	ST 1551	1961
Zither Goes West	LP, Mono	Capitol Records	T 1672	1962
Zither Goes West	LP, Stereo	Capitol Records	ST 1672	Unknown
Christmas In Zitherland	LP, Stereo	Capitol Records	ST 1782	1962
Latin Zither	LP, Mono	Capitol Records	T 1863	1963
Latin Zither	LP, Stereo	Capitol Records	ST 1863	1963
Zither Goes Hollywood	LP, Mono	Capitol Records	T-1986	1963
Zither Goes Hollywood	LP, Stereo	Capitol Records	ST-1986	1963
Sentimental Zither	LP	Capitol Records	ST 2064	1964
The Concert Zither	LP, Album, Mono	Capitol Records	P 8602	1964
Ruth Welcome And The Milt Shaw Trio - At A Sidewalk Cafe	LP, Album, Mono	Capitol Records	T 1209	1964?
Ruth Welcome And The Milt Shaw Trio - At A Sidewalk Cafe	LP, Album	Capitol Records	ST 1209	Unknown
Continental Zither	LP, Album, Mono	Capitol Records	T 2472	1965?
Continental Zither	LP, Stereo	Capitol Records	ST2472	Unknown
Sounds Of The Time - Cafe Continental	LP, Cle	Cook	10326	1966
Zither In 3/4 Time	LP, RE	Capitol Records	ST-1318	1967

Singles & EPs

Title	Format	Label	Issue Number	Date of Issue	B-Side
Ruth Welcome, Dick Marta - The Zither / The Cimbalom	10"	Cook	1032	Unknown	n/a
Themes From "The Third Man"	7", Single, RE	Capitol Records	6086	Unknown	B: Song From Moulin Rouge (Where Is Your Heart)
Allison's Theme	7", Single	Capitol Records	4562	Unknown	B: Hank's Tune
Ruth Welcome Con El Conjunto De Earl Shelton	7", Single	Capitol Records	CC - 3303	Unknown	B: Welcome In Colombia
