= Parang =

Popular folk music originating from Venezuela and Trinidad and Tobago

- Stylistic origins: Joropo, Jota, Venezuelan music, Latin American music, Spanish music, Trinidadian music
- Cultural origins: Venezuela and Trinidad and Tobago

Fusion genres
- Chutney parang and Parang soca

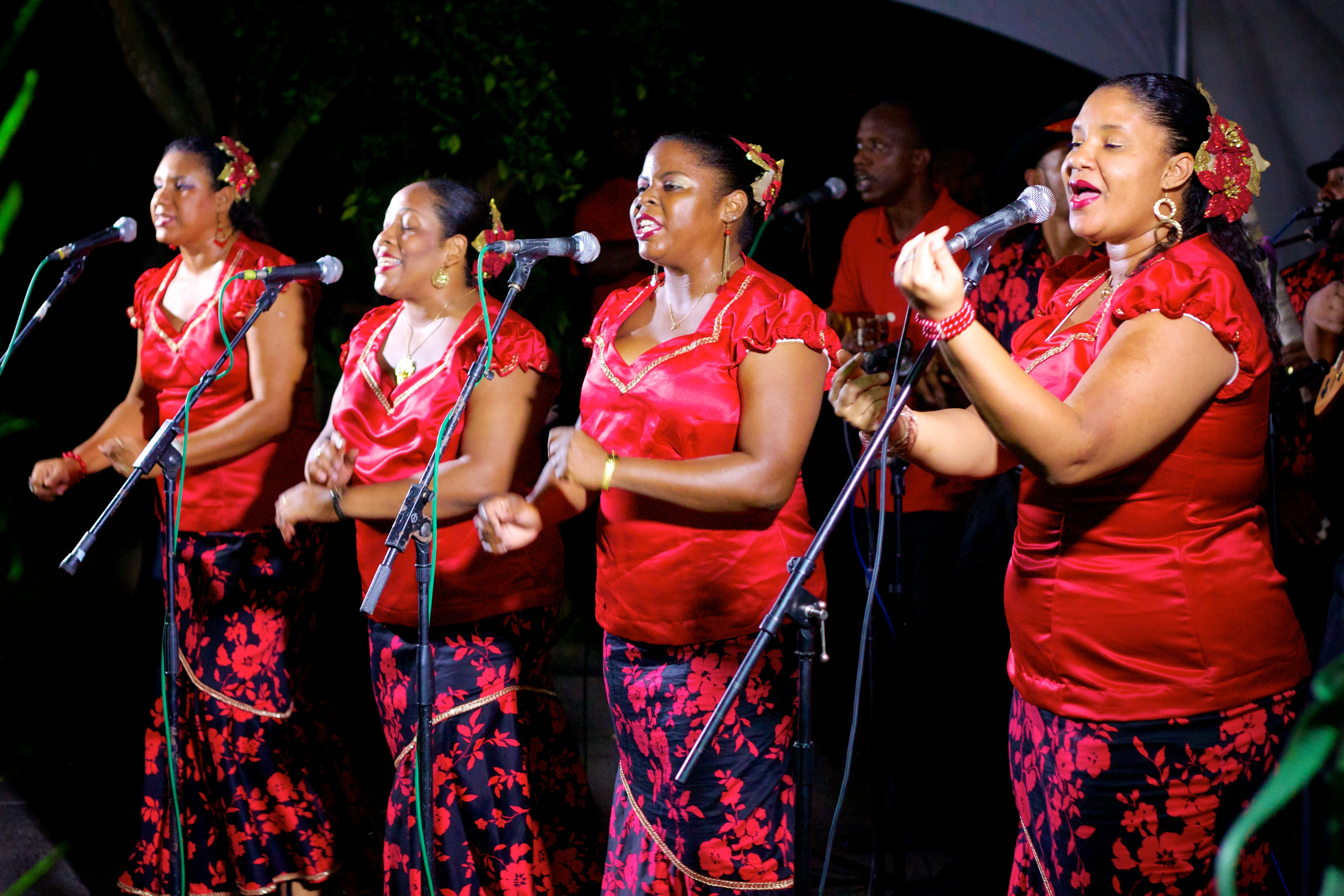

Parang is a popular folk music originating from Venezuela and Trinidad and Tobago that was brought to Trinidad and Tobago by Venezuelan migrants who were primarily of Amerindian, Spanish, Mestizo, Pardo, and African heritage, something which is strongly reflected in the music itself. The word is derived from two Spanish words: parranda, meaning "a spree”, and parar meaning "to stop".

In the past, it was traditional for parang serenaders to pay nocturnal visits to the homes of family and friends, where part of the fun was waking the inhabitants of the household from their beds. Today, parang is especially vibrant in Trinidad and Tobago communities such as Paramin, Lopinot, and Arima.

A new form of parang, soca parang, has emerged. Soca parang is a combination of soca and parang.

== Performance ==
In Trinidad, traditional parang music is largely performed around Christmastime, when singers and instrumentalists (collectively known as the parranderos) travel from house to house in the community, often joined by friends, neighbours, and family, using whatever instruments are at hand. Popular parang instruments include the Venezuelan cuatro (a small, four-string guitar) and maracas (locally known as chac-chacs). Other instruments often used are violin, guitar, claves (locally known as toc-toc), box bass (an indigenous instrument), tambourine, mandolin, bandol, caja (a percussive box instrument), and marimbola (an Afro-Venezuelan instrument). In exchange for the entertainment, parranderos are traditionally given food and drink: pasteles, pastelle, sorrel, rum and Ponche Crema (a form of alcoholic eggnog).

While traditional house-to-house caroling tradition is still practised by some small groups and larger organized groups, modern parang music has also developed a season of staged performances called parang fiestas, held from October through to January each year, culminating in a national parang competition. Today, parang is especially vibrant in Trinidad and Tobago communities such as Paramin, Lopinot, and Arima.

== Varieties ==
Traditional parang music includes a variety of song types:

- aguinaldo or serenal: relating to the stories of the nativity of Christ similar to European carols played in the Canary Islands and Andalusia;
- guarapo: a secular song, often with passages of improvised lyrics where content and length vary according to the skill of the lead singer;
- estribillo: a lively call-and-response style song;
- Rio Manzanares: a Venezuelan waltz which celebrates the different aspects of the Manzanares River of Cumaná, Venezuela;
- joropo: similar in style to the Spanish waltz;
- galerón;
- picón:
- cantiques de Noel: which were sung in Patois. These Christmas songs were brought to Trinidad and Tobago from the French Caribbean islands of Martinique and Guadeloupe, and include lyrics about the birth of Jesus Christ;
- despedida: a song of farewell and gratitude.

Since the 1950s, parang has become more popularised. In the 1980s it evolved into "soca parang", a fusion of soca and parang with lyrics in English. While still festive in nature, the lyrics often refer to North American cultural elements such as Santa Claus.

Parang has also been fused with chutney, a form of vocal music indigenous to Trinidad, influenced by Indian rhythms and sometimes sung in Hindustani. This fusion forms chutney parang.
