= Ground zither =

Musical instrument

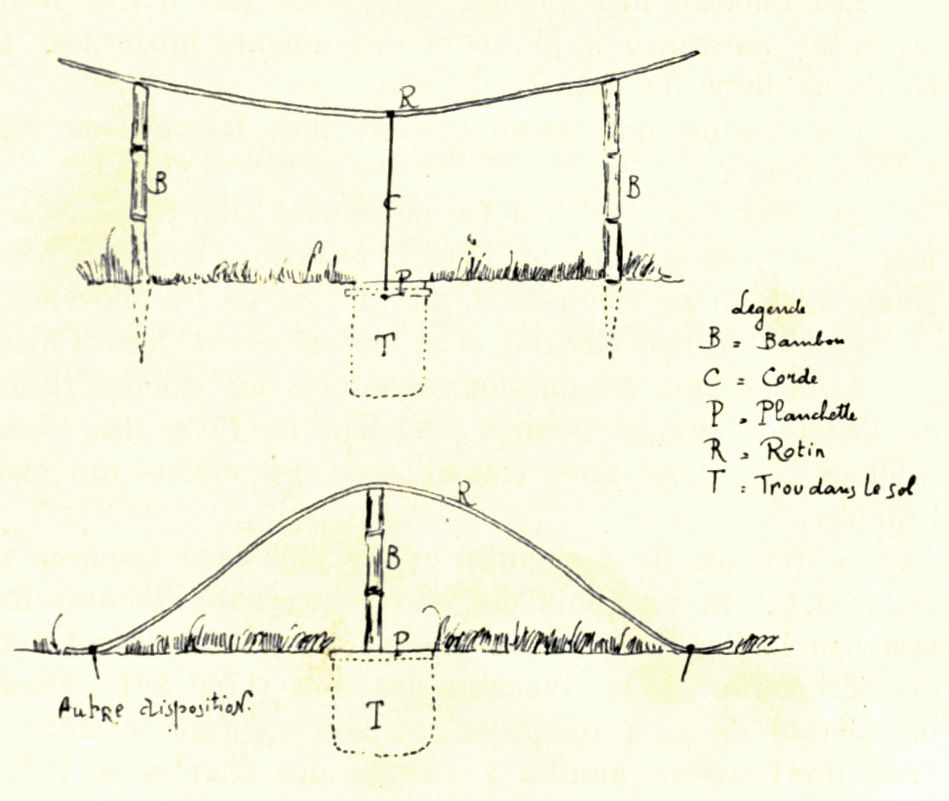
Two types of Vietnamese ground zither cái trống quân

The ground zither (also French: cithare en terre) is a simple string instrument. In one Vietnamese variant one may use a long bamboo stick resting its ends on the ends of two forked tree branches stuck in the ground. In the middle of that bamboo stick, a rope this tied to a thin board covering the hole in the ground.

In an African variant, guio môkoun instead of the horizontal bamboo stick a horizontal rope is stretched, and the vertical rope is tied not to the middle, but making a longer and shorter horizontal pieces. The instrument is played by hitting horizontal pieces with the stick. The longer piece gives low tone, while the short piece gives high tone. Guio môkoun also known as guio yebe is in fact translated as "ground drum" (guio = ground, môkoun (or yebe) = drum).

== See also ==
- Ground bow
