= Ground bow =

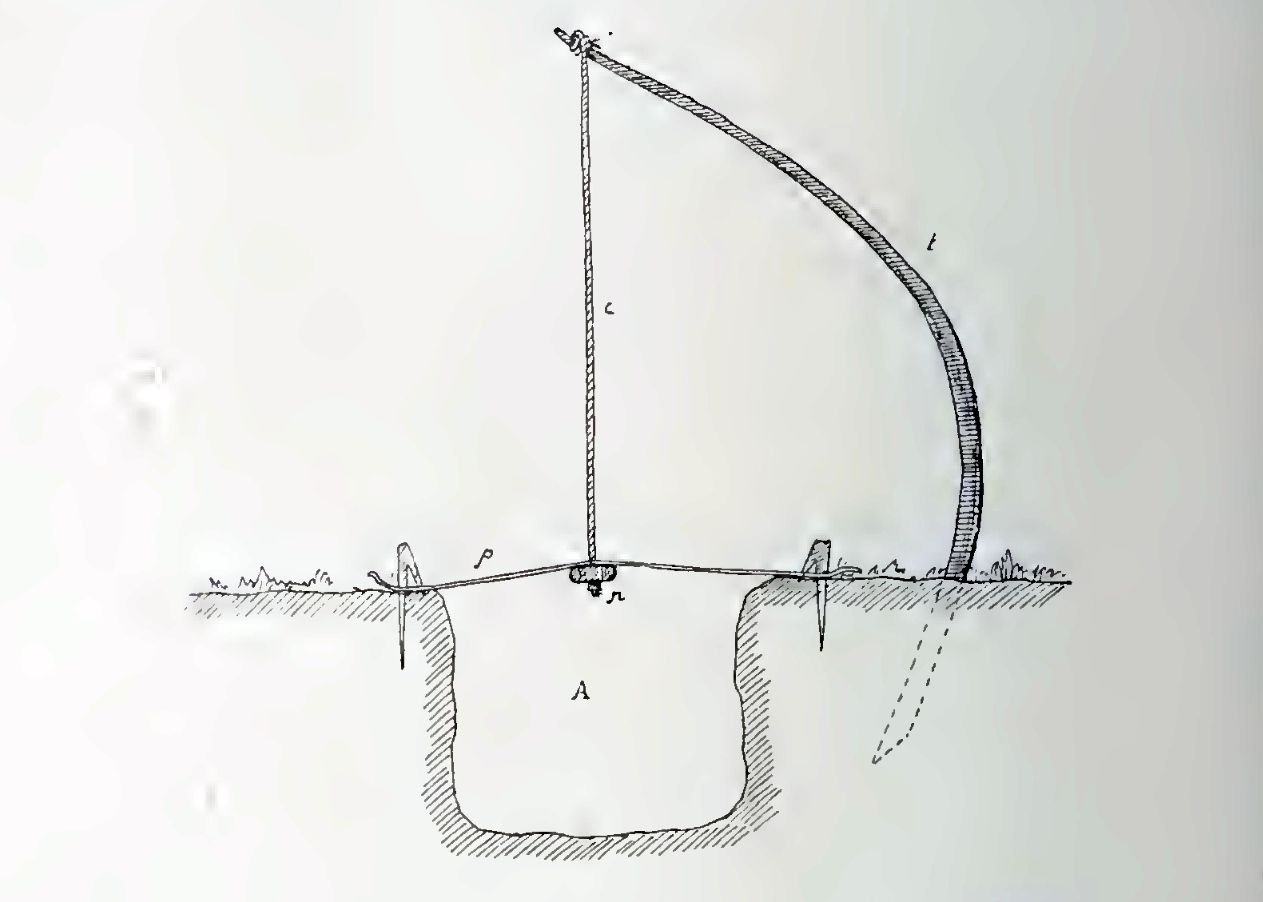
Ground bow dyulu tama in Fouta Djallon region of Guinea, 1908

The ground-bow, also known as an earth-bow or ground harp, is a single-string bow-shaped folk musical instrument, classified as a chordophone. It is known in cultures of equatorial and south Africa, and in other cultures with African roots. It consists of a flexible stick planted into the ground (possibly a stripped sapling or a branch), with a string from its free end to a resonator of some kind based on a pit in the ground. It looks like a game trap or a child toy, therefore its distribution over Africa used to be overlooked. Hornbostel (1933) classified is in the category of harps, although it has combined characteristics of a harp and a musical bow.

The resonator may be a pit covered by a board, with string attached to it. Kruges describes several other constructions by Venda, e.g., the other end of a string is tied to a stone dropped into the pit, with string passing through the board covering the pit, etc.

Other names include kalinga or galinga by Venda people. In their language "galinga" means simply a hole in the ground, while the origins of "kalinga" are uncertain. It is known as gayumba in Haiti, Dominican Republic, and tumbandera in Haitian traditions of Cuba. Baka people call it angbindi.

It is also known in Cuba under the onomatopoeic name tingo-talango (tingotalango). Julio Cueva's song Tingo Talango dedicated to this musical instrument describes its construction thus:

Si quieren que les describa
cómo es el tingo talango
tráiganme un gajo de güira
o si no uno de mango.

Se abre un hueco en el suelo,
encima una hoja de lata,
en el centro un agujero
donde un alambre se ata.

Translation:

If you want me to describe
how is the tingo talango
bring me a slice of güira
or if not, one of mango.

A hole opens in the ground
a tin sheet on top,
in the center a hole
where a wire is tied.

Tingo Talango is also the song by Ñico Lora.

The instrument is reportedly nearly-extinct in the native cultures.

== Playing techniques ==
Kalinga may be struck by a stick or plucked in various ways. The bow stick may be bent to change the tension of the string, and hence the tone. It can be played in a glissando manner: the stick is bent, struck, and released, producing a peculiar sound. The produced pitches are not always stable.

Kalinga is usually played to provide repetitive accompaniment to the choral song.

== See also ==
- Ground zither
