= Box bass =

A box bass is an acoustic instrument that is indigenous to Trinidad and Tobago. It is mostly used in Parang.

The instrument consists of a wooden box that is attached to a taut string. The string/chord is thrummed and the box creates a heavy acoustic sound. The pitch of the sound is changed by altering the tension of the string, which changes the pitch of the sound. The instrument is used to keep tempo of the Parang Band.
