= Despedida =

Despedida or La Despedida - the Spanish word meaning "Farewell" - may refer to:

== Film and TV ==
- La despedida, a 1957 Argentinian film directed by Miguel Morayta
- La despedida, a 2012 Argentinian film directed by Juan Manuel D'Emilio

== Music ==
- "Despedida," a song by the Mexican composer María Grever (1885–1951)
- "Despedida" (Julieta Venegas song), 2010
- "Despedida" (Shakira song), 2008
- "Despedida", a song by José Miguel Class
- "Despedida", a standard on the Rolando Villazón album ¡México!
- "Despedida", a song by Odilio González
- "Despedida", a song by composer Pedro Flores
- "De Despedida", a song by La Trampa from their 2003 album Frente a Frente (Live at Talleres de Don Bosco)
- "La Despedida", a song by Puerto Rican reggaeton singer Daddy Yankee
- "La Despedida", by the French singer Manu Chao in his Clandestino solo album

== See also ==
- Despedida de casada, a 1968 Mexican film
- Despedida de Solteiro, a 1992 Brazilian soap opera
- Despedida de Solteros, a 2011 Spanish-language play starring Tito Speranza
- Despedida de Solteros, an Argentine reality show
- "Despedida de Soltero", a song by Spanish band Gran Baobab for their 2009 Eurovision Song Contest entry
