= Johann Petzmayer =

Austrian zither player (1803–1884)

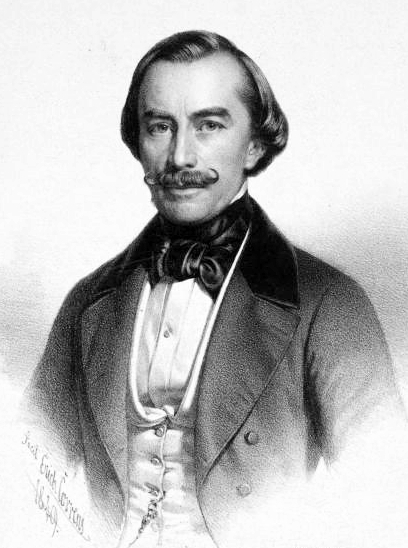
Johann Petzmayer, by Erich Correns

Johann Petzmayer (18 March 1803 – 29 December 1884) was an Austrian zither player, influential in making the instrument well-known.

== Early life and career ==
Petzmayer was born in Zistersdorf, Lower Austria in 1803; his father moved to Vienna, where in Neulerchenfeld he ran an inn. He intended that his son should continue the business. Johann started to teach himself to play the violin; aged 18 he had an opportunity to play a zither, and rapidly learned to play it.

His father's inn was near the Linienwall, an outer line of fortifications around the city, and so was visited by travellers. Guests came to the inn, attracted by the playing. The name of the inn was Zum Heiligen Johann (Holy John), and Johann became known as Heilige Schan. His reputation grew, and he was invited to play at the houses of nobles; in 1827 Emperor Franz I summoned him to play at court.

== Concert tours ==
Playing the zither became his full-time occupation. In the following years he gave concerts in many towns and cities of Austria and Germany. In early concerts he was accompanied by a guitar and violin, later by a small orchestra.

After playing in the opera house in Berlin in 1834, he was summoned to play for the King of Prussia at the court in Berlin: to Petzmayer's playing, the sisters Therese and Fanny Elssler performed ländler of Upper Austria and national dances.

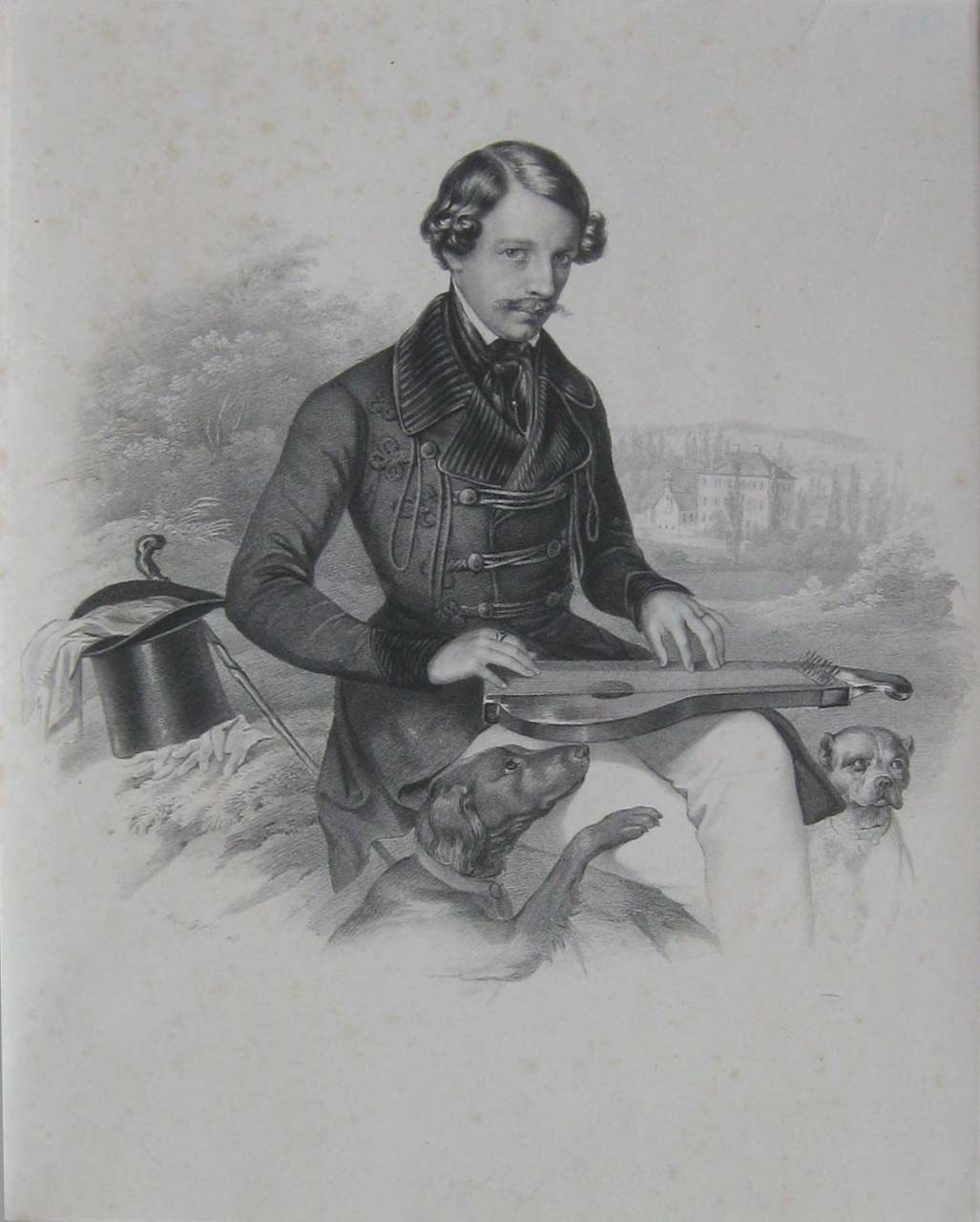
Duke Maximilian, playing a zither

In 1837 he gave a concert in Bamberg. In the audience was Duke Maximilian Joseph in Bavaria, then aged 29; he decided to learn to play the zither, appointing Petzmayer chamber virtuoso, and became his student. In 1838 Petzmayer accompanied the Duke to Egypt, Palestine, Asia Minor and Greece. The Duke became an accomplished player and published music for the zither.

A critic described a concert given by Petzmayer in Cannstatt in 1844: "The actual basic colour of Petzmayer's playing is an idyllic mood, blended with an elegiac melancholy; he elicits from his homely instrument sounds whose sweetness, cordiality and soul penetrate all to the heart...."

He invented the Streichzither, which is played with a bow.

Petzmayer died in Munich in 1884.
