= Paramin =

Village in Maraval, Trinidad and Tobago

Paramin is a village located on one of the highest points of western area of the Northern Range in Trinidad, Trinidad and Tobago, which forms part of the Maraval area. It is administered by the Diego Martin Regional Corporation. It is a sprawling, steep and mountainous village whose residents have traditionally been farmers, producing herbs like chives, thyme and parsley, as well as vegetables like tomatoes and yams.

== Population ==
Botanist Augustus Fendler on his visit to the Maraval area

Many of the original residents of the area are descendants of the French Creole migrants to the island following the Cedula of Population (1783) and the surnames reflect this heritage: Constantine, Boisson, Fournillier (Fournier), Isidore, Laurent (Lawrence), Pascal, Romany, etc. Following the Cedula of Population, Paramin was peopled by immigrants from Martinique, Guadeloupe, Grenada (La Grenade), Dominica (La Dominique), St. Lucia (Ste. Lucie), etc.

Paramin was later also populated by Cocoa Panyols from Venezuela in South America who aided in establishing the cocoa industry. The Cocoa Panyols are an Hispanic (Latino) ethnic mixture of mainly European (Spanish and/or French), Amerindian and African ancestry.

Some of the early settlers in the village of Paramin were runaway slaves from the Maraval (Negre Marron Caves) and Diego Martin Valleys (Camp Marron or Cameron).

== Names of places within Paramin ==
Within Paramin many locations have French names including La Finette Road Saut D'Eau, Morne Espoire, Morne Roche, Beau Pres, Morne Rene

== Music ==
The area is also home to two specific music genres—Crèche and Parang Both are specifically played at Christmas time. They reflect the French and Spanish influences of the island mixed with Afro/Caribbean beats. Parang has seen a large resurgence in recent years with mixes of both Soca and even Chutney music with lyrics in English. The Maraval Folk Choir, known for both Crèche and Parang, produced a Crèche album in the 1970s, and the Paramin Folk Choir produced one in 2004.

== Catholicism ==
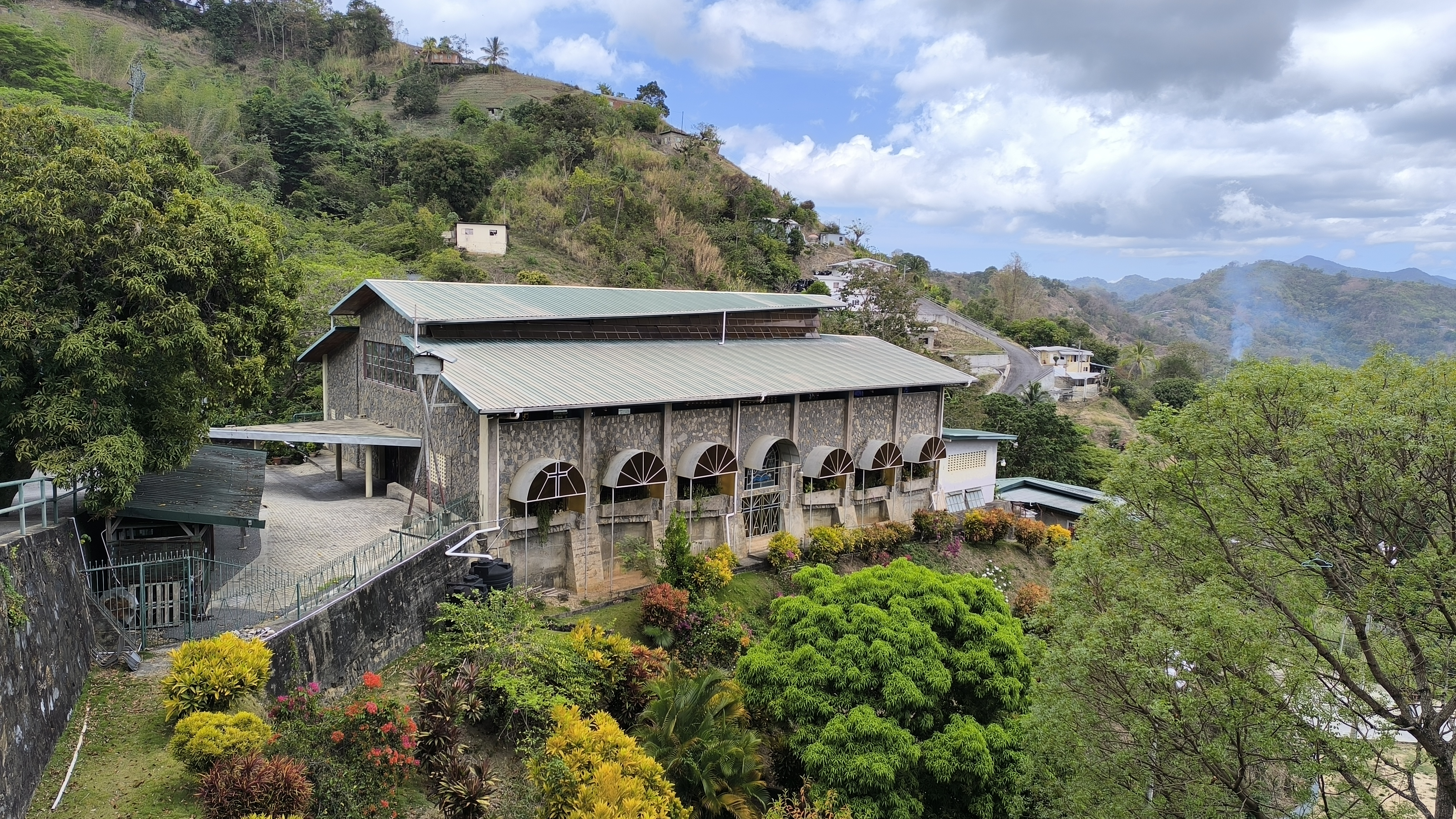
Our Lady of Guadalupe catholic church

The area is predominantly Roman Catholic with many of the residents being practicing Catholics. Within the village of Paramin are a Roman Catholic primary school and a Catholic church (Our Lady of Guadalupe) that serve the area. The churches within Paramin and Maraval are linked in their record keeping of the Sacraments.

== Activity ==
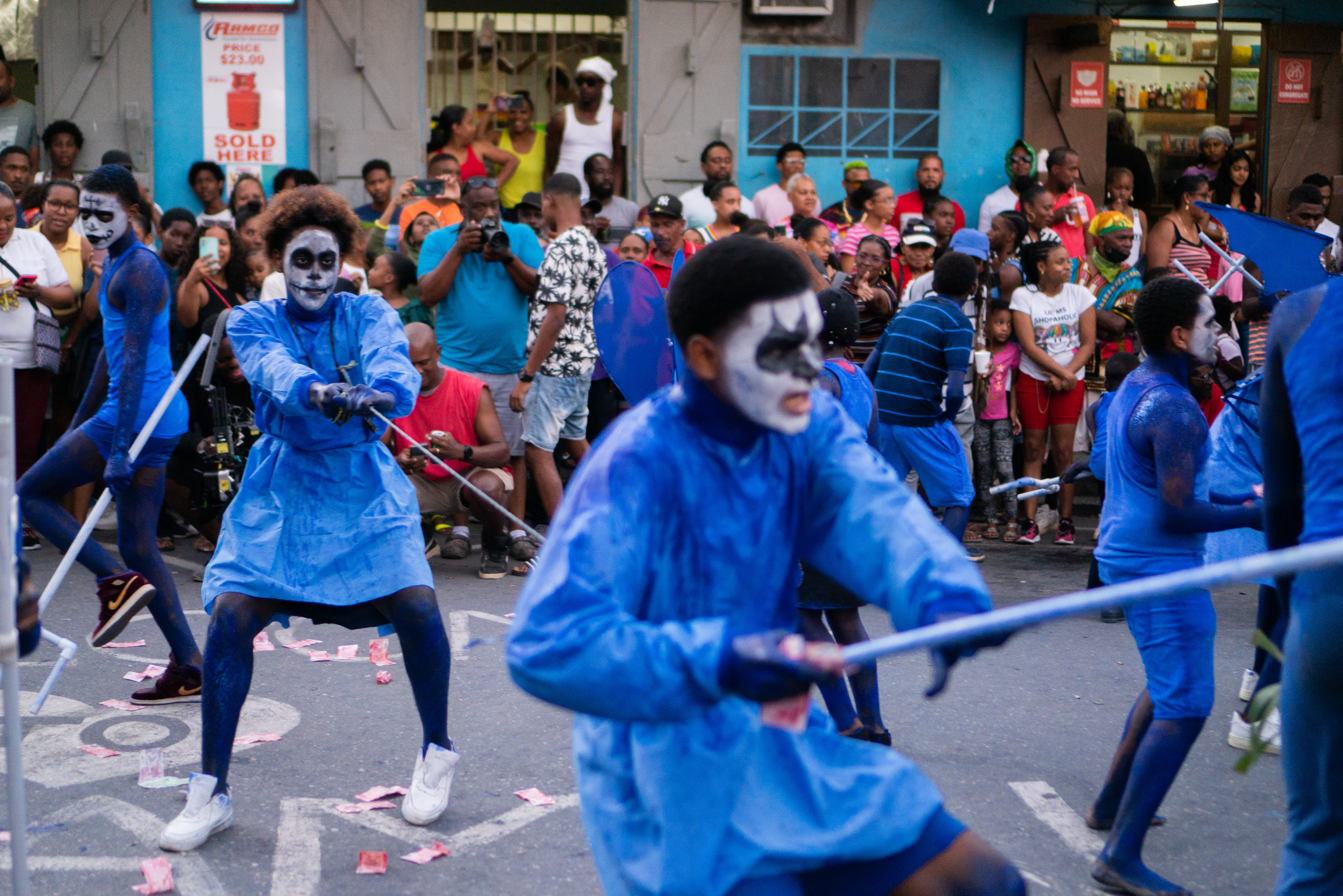
Carnival in Paramin

=== French Creole or Patois mass on Dimanche Gras ===
The church still offers a well-known French Creole or Patois mass on Dimanche Gras, the Sunday before Carnival, exploring the steep Paramin hills. Persons from areas outside of Maraval and Paramin, including foreign dignitaries of French origin and French Creole origin such as Louisiana attend the Mass either to experience the culture of the area or to participate in an activity that falls outside of the Carnival setting.

Most of the Mass is said in Creole or Patois. There is a choir which leads the singing of the hymns at the Mass.

Members of the choir and the congregation at the Mass are dressed in colorful plaids, in the style of La Reine Rive, which is a white cotton top and skirt, with an overskirt in plaid, which drapes to the sides of the front of the skirt and leaves the front of the white skirt visible. A head "tie" also in a matching plaid completes the outfit.

=== Caliente Monday ===
Caliente Monday refers to a Monday evening celebration in Paramin of Parang and food. This event has been held for more than thirty years. The event used to be open to the public or those brave enough to go up to Paramin by jeep earlier in an evening when the sun sets earlier in the day and the air gets cold earlier in the evening, just to hear the Parang Bands from across the country sing either their compositions or renditions of popular songs. At the event, residents of Paramin sell provisions and pork, and various types of pastelles.

Over the last few years, the event has been held at the Country Club on Long Circular Road in Maraval.

=== Hiking ===
Over the last fifteen to twenty years, persons have hiked to the top of Saut D'Eau (Hill and Waterfall) to experience the ruggedness of the mountain trek.

There are also tours or hikes to the Cave in Paramin. According to Sokah2Soca "it should also be noted that the area is also famous for its bat caves with eye catching limestone formations. It is reported that these caves are some of the most easily accessible caves in the island".
