= Caura River (Trinidad and Tobago) =

River in Trinidad

Coordinates: 10°42′N 61°21′W

The Tacarigua River (commonly known as the Caura River) is a river on the island of Trinidad. It originates in the Northern Range and drains into the Caura Valley. It passes through the towns Tacarigua, Macoya & St Augustine in the East–West Corridor before joining the Caroni River. The Caura River is important both recreationally and culturally.

== History ==
It was once an Arawak settlement.

In 1943 there was a controversial proposal to build a dam on the river. The project was started but never completes. The equipment for the construction of this proposed dam still lies there to date. The money was embezzled and still cannot be accounted for. After this fiasco, Caura was successfully into a park for aesthetic purposes.

However, due to the recent spate of crime which has risen to plague the country, it has become a favorite hot spot for crime, with visitors reporting items stolen from their cars, as well as armed robberies.

== Contamination ==
Currently the Caura River is at risk to pollution from fertilizers and pesticides used by the farmers within the valley and solid waste from visitors who visit for leisure. It is also at risk from heavy metal pollution, mostly from nearby industry.

== See also ==
- List of rivers in Trinidad and Tobago
