= Dulcimer =

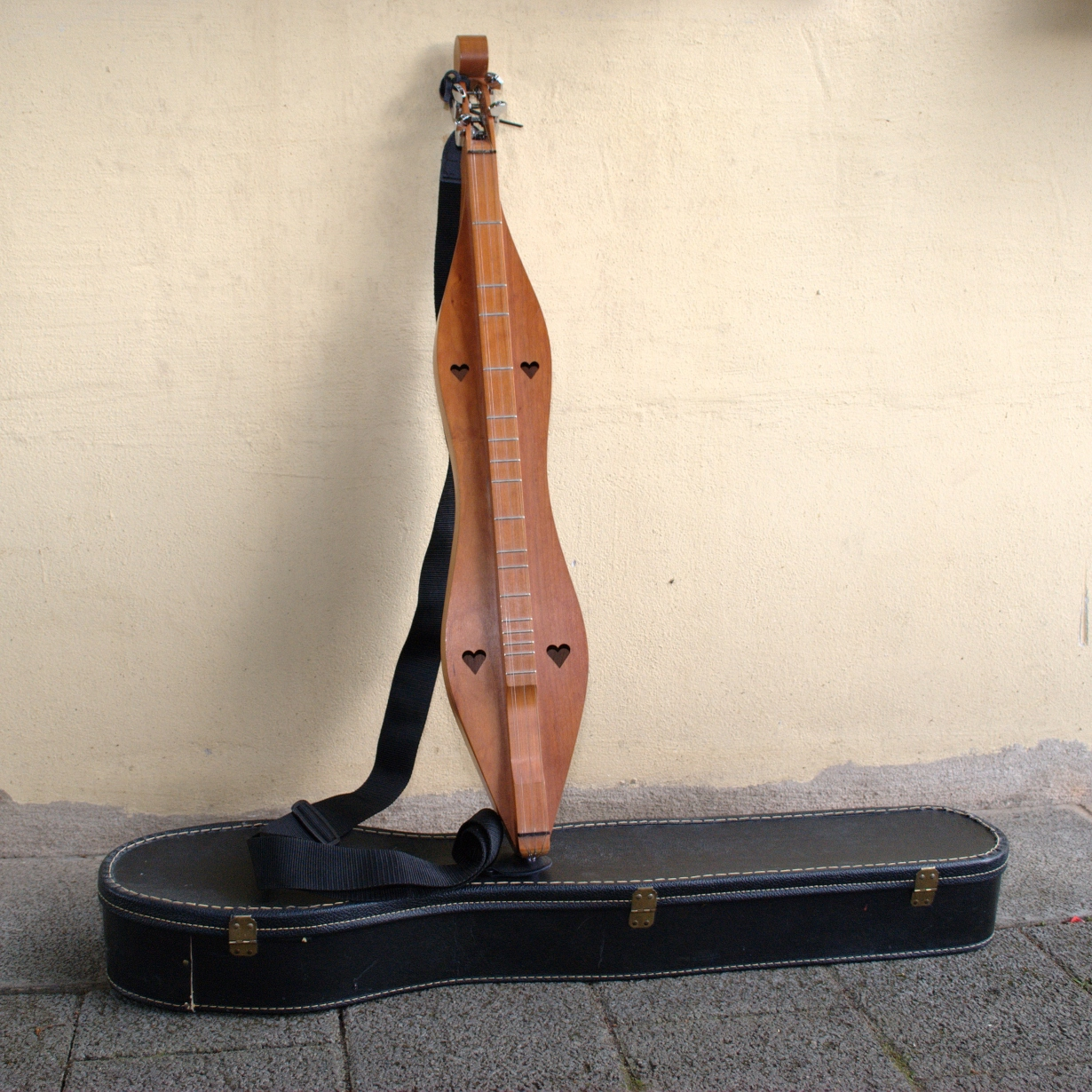
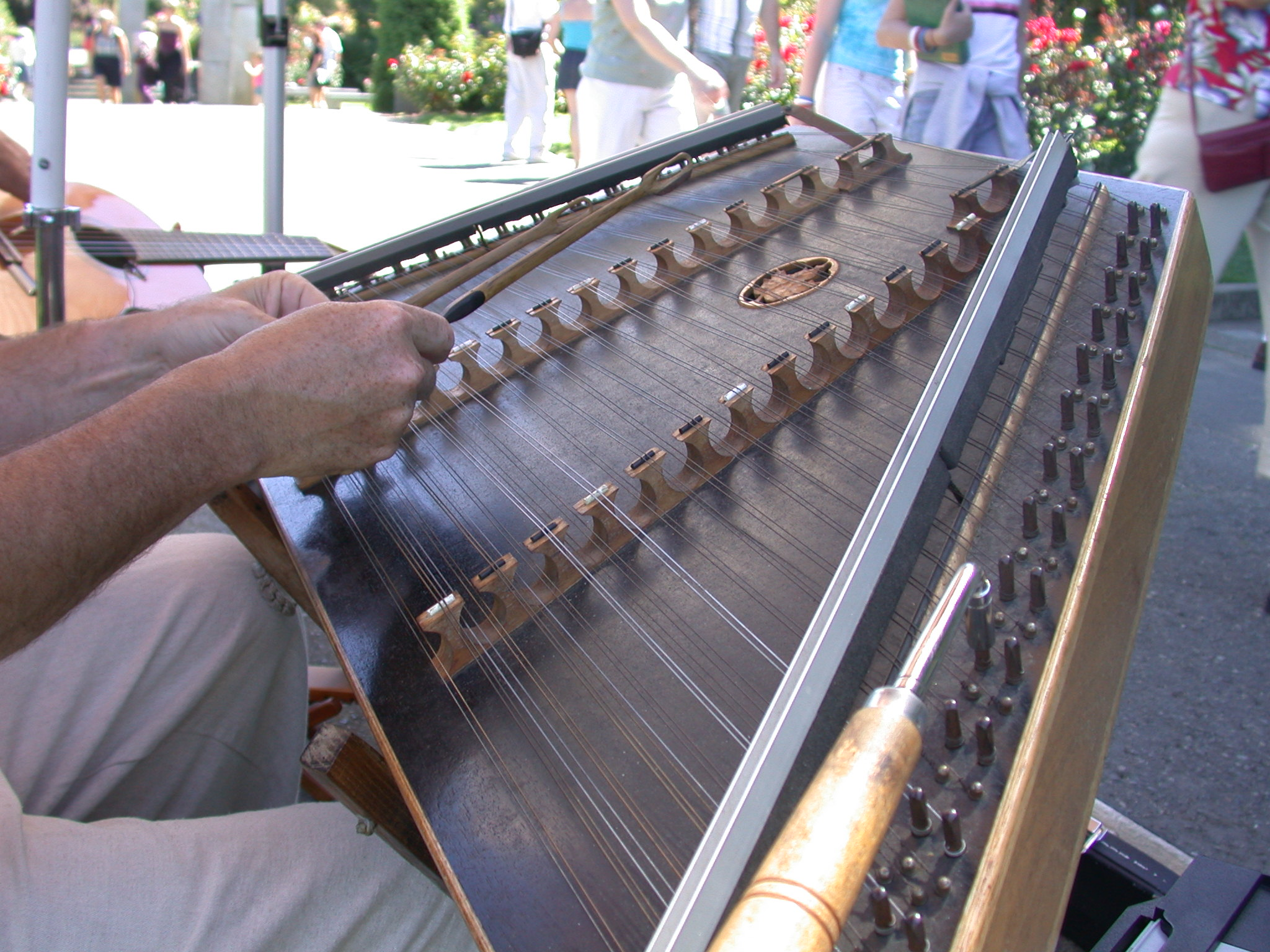
- Two types of dulcimer: An Appalachian dulcimer......and a hammered dulcimer.

String instrument
- Classification: Plucked string instruments; Struck string instruments
- Developed: Antiquity

Musicians
- List of Appalachian dulcimer players; List of hammered dulcimer players

The term dulcimer refers to two families of musical string instruments.

== Hammered dulcimers ==
The word dulcimer originally referred to a trapezoidal zither similar to a psaltery whose many strings are struck by handheld "hammers". Variants of this instrument are found in many cultures, including:

- Hammered dulcimer (England, Scotland, United States)
- Hackbrett (southern Germany, Austria, Switzerland)
- Tsymbaly (Ukraine), tsimbl (Ashkenazi Jewish), țambal (Romania) and cimbalom (Hungary) may refer to either a relatively small folk instrument or a larger classical instrument ("cimbál" in the Czech Republic). The santouri (Greece) (called "santur" in the Ottoman Empire) is almost identical to the Jewish and Romanian folk instruments.
- Santur (Iran and Iraq)
- Santoor (northern India and Pakistan) is constructed and tuned differently from the santur of Iran and Iraq
- Khim (Cambodia, Laos, Thailand)
- Yangqin (China), Đàn tam thập lục (Vietnam), yanggeum (Korea)

== Appalachian mountain dulcimer and derivatives ==
In the Appalachian region of the U.S. in the nineteenth century, hammered dulcimers were rare. There, the word dulcimer, familiar from the King James Version of the Bible, referred to a three- or four-stringed fretted instrument, generally played on the lap by strumming.

Variants include:

- The original Appalachian dulcimer
- Various twentieth century derivatives, including
  - Banjo dulcimer, with banjo-like resonating membrane
  - Resonator dulcimer, with inset conical resonator
  - Bowed dulcimer, teardrop-shaped and played upright with a bow
  - Electric dulcimer, various types of dulcimer which use a pickup to amplify the sound
