= September 1927 =

Month of 1927

<<	September 1927					>>
Su	Mo	Tu	We	Th	Fr	Sa
				1	2	3
4	5	6	7	8	9	10
11	12	13	14	15	16	17
18	19	20	21	22	23	24
25	26	27	28	29	30

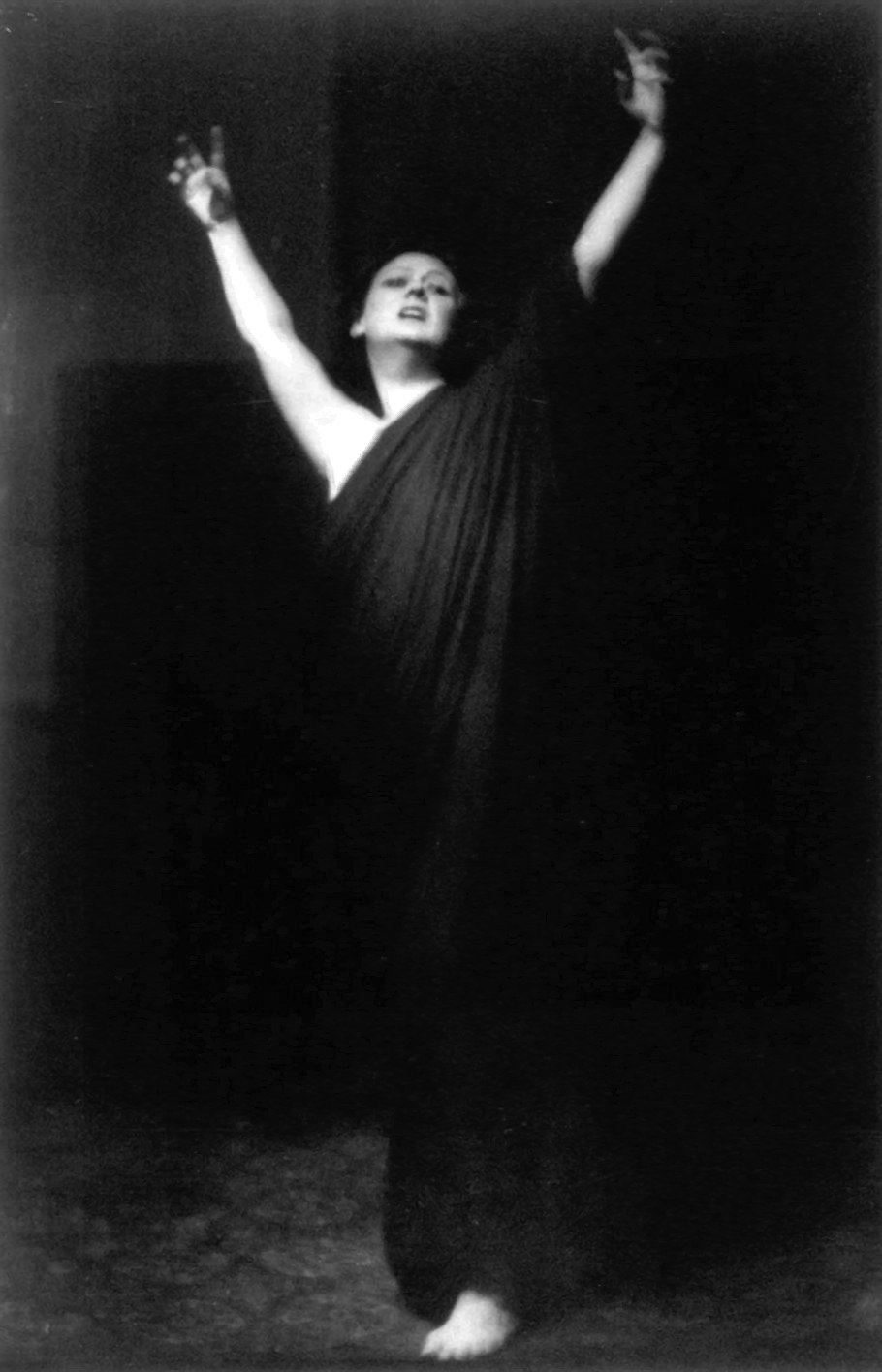
September 14, 1927: Isadora Duncan killed in freak accident

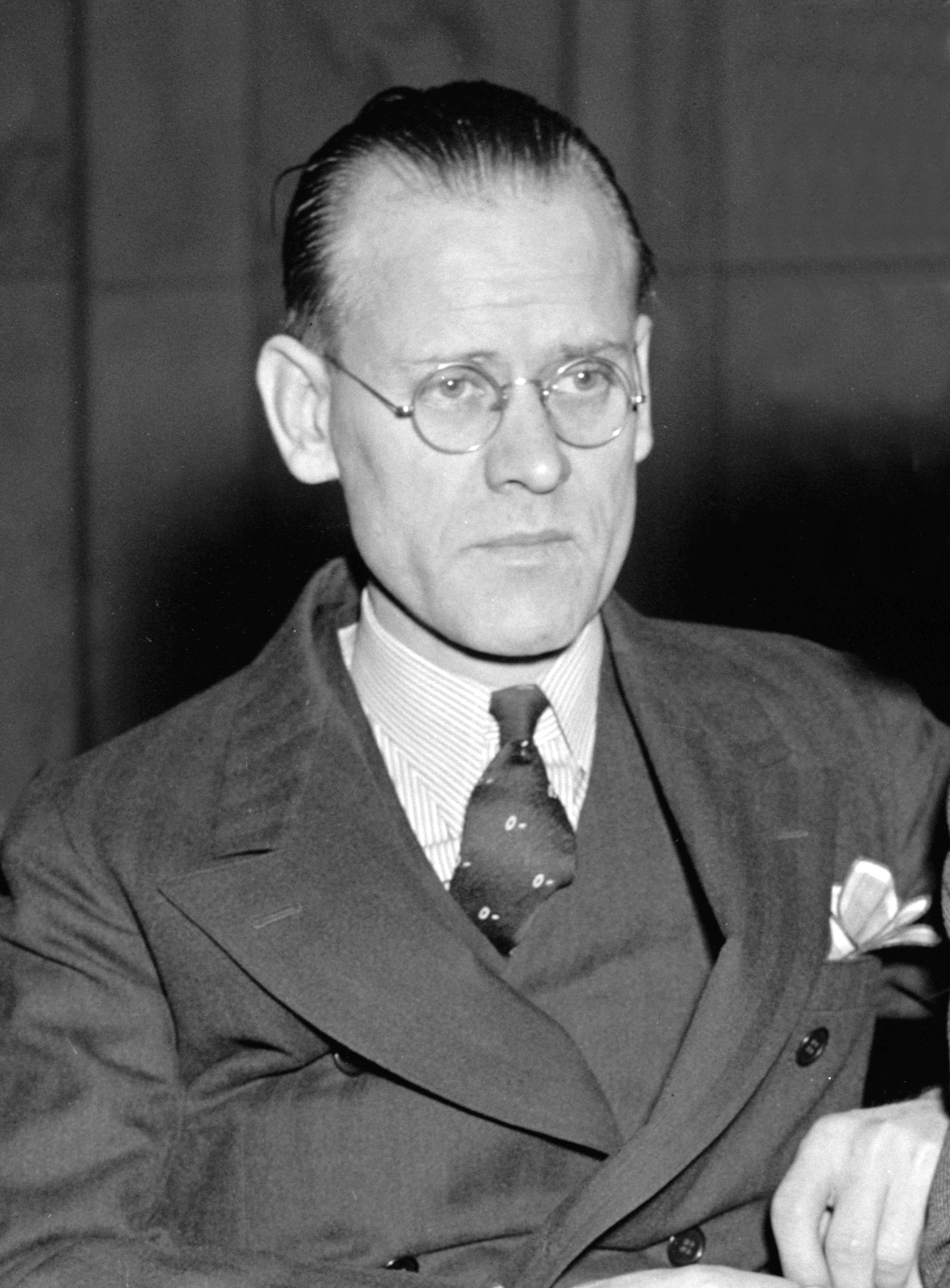
September 7, 1927: Philo Farnsworth demonstrates first electronic television

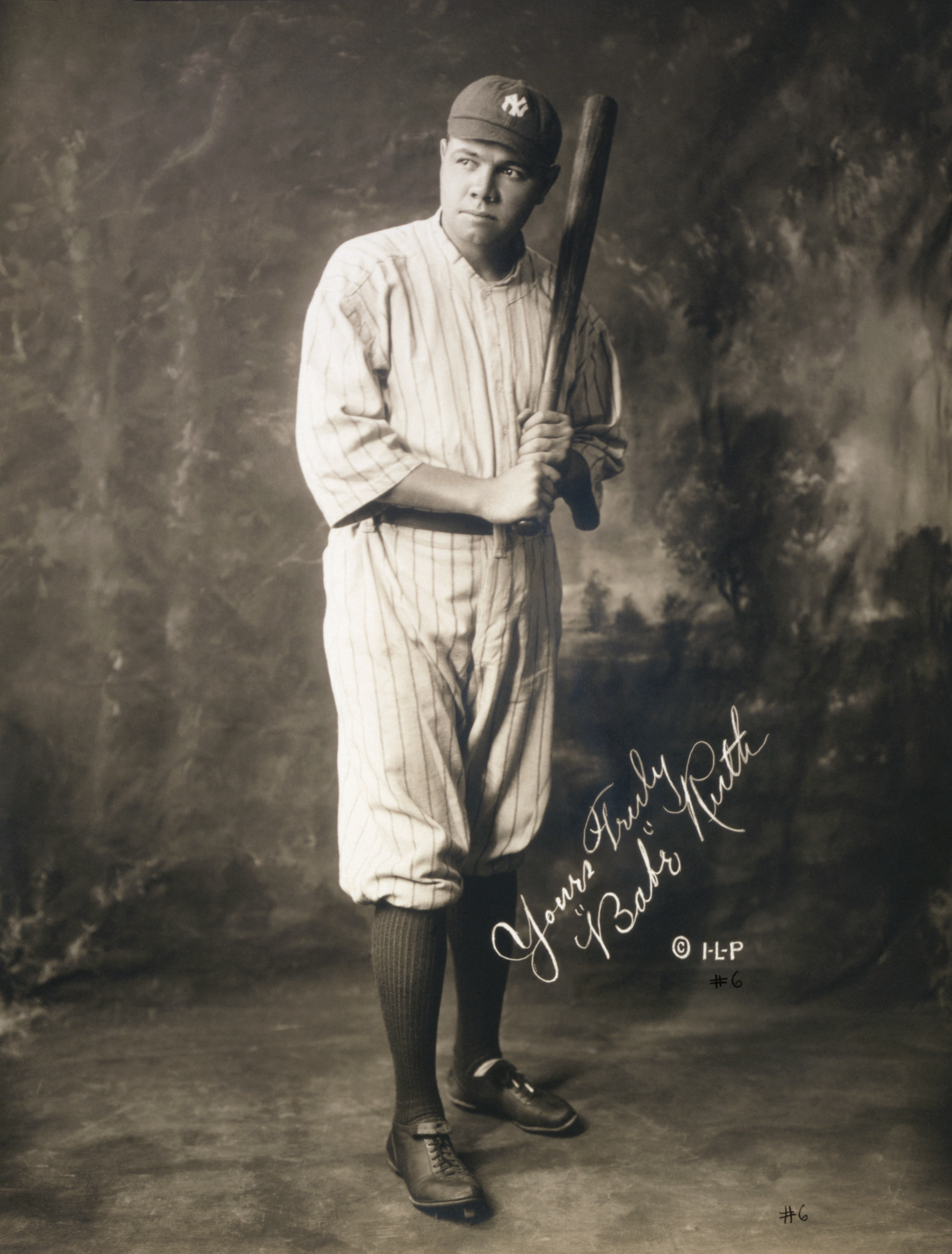
September 30, 1927: Babe Ruth hits 60th home run

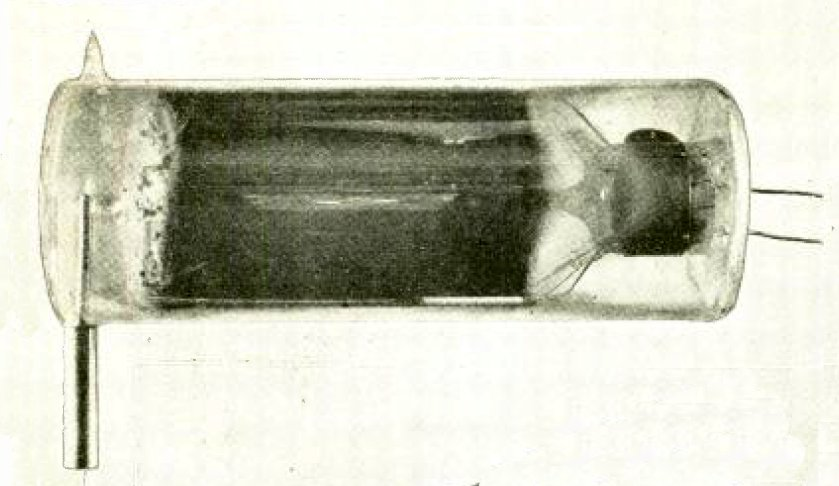
Farnsworth's "image dissector" tube

The following events occurred in September 1927:

== September 1, 1927 (Thursday) ==
- National Air Transport, a predecessor of United Airlines, began the first air express delivery service, flying from Chicago to New York with "newsreels, machinery parts, advertising copy, trade journals, candy and Paris garters", Hadley Field near New Brunswick, NJ, to Chicago.
- Born: Lloyd Bucher, captain of the USS Pueblo (AGER-2) spy ship that was captured by North Korea in 1968; in Pocatello, Idaho (d. 2004)
- Died:
  - Charles Coghlan, 64, Prime Minister of Southern Rhodesia since 1923; he was succeeded by Howard Unwin Moffat.
  - Amelia Bingham, 58, American stage actress

== September 2, 1927 (Friday) ==
- At least eleven people were killed in the explosion of a fireworks factory in San Martín, Buenos Aires.
- Augusto César Sandino, Nicaraguan rebel leader, assembled his soldiers outside his remote fortress at El Chipote, and gathered villagers from the surrounding area to present the new charter for his Army for the Defense of National Sovereignty. Hundreds of people signed a statement of commitment to the Sandinista manifesto. Many who were illiterate signed with their thumbprints.
- Babe Ruth of the New York Yankees hit the 400th home run of his career, becoming the first player to do so.
- The drama film The Garden of Allah starring Alice Terry and Iván Petrovich was released.

== September 3, 1927 (Saturday) ==
- In Youngstown, Ohio, 43-year-old Tony De Capua came home from work, picked up a .32-caliber semi-automatic pistol, and went on a shooting spree, killing his wife, his four daughters and his two grandchildren at his home at 443 Marion Avenue, then killed a neighbor. DeCapua shot and wounded his daughter-in-law, a passerby, and a city policeman, who returned fire and then overpowered the killer. DeCapua was later ruled incompetent to stand trial and sent to the Ohio Hospital for the Criminally Insane in Lima.
- Hale Woodruff departed from New York for two years of study in France. After his return, he became one of the foremost African-American painters.
- Born: John Hamman, American magician; in St. Louis (d. 2000)

== September 4, 1927 (Sunday) ==
- Twenty-two people were killed and more than one hundred injured in the 1927 Nagpur riots.
- Born:
  - John McCarthy, American computer scientist and 1971 Turing award winner for work in artificial intelligence; in Boston (d. 2011)
  - Ferenc Sánta, Hungarian novelist; in Braşov, Romania (d. 2008)

== September 5, 1927 (Monday) ==
- Universal Studios introduced the first completely animated Walt Disney film short, with Oswald the Lucky Rabbit appearing in Trolley Troubles. Oswald was later superseded by the more popular Mickey Mouse.
- Bob Hope, 24, made his first appearance on Broadway, in The Sidewalks of New York, as a chorus boy, cast with his vaudeville partner George Byrne.
- Born: Paul Volcker, American economist, Chairman of the Federal Reserve Board 1979–1987; in Cape May, New Jersey (d. 2019)
- Died:
  - Marcus Loew, 57, founder of the Loews Theatres chain of cinemas
  - Wayne Wheeler, 57, American temperance movement leader for the Anti-Saloon League

== September 6, 1927 (Tuesday) ==
- The capsizing of a ferryboat drowned 280 people in the Yellow Sea near Kaishu, Kokaido province (now Haeju, Hwanghaenam-do province of North Korea).
- U.S. Army Major General George Owen Squier was granted U.S. Patent No. 1,641,608 for his invention of "wired radio", a forerunner of Muzak and cable television that sent clear radio signals to home subscribers without the interference that plagued wireless radio broadcasts. Squier had applied for his patent on June 24, 1922, shortly after it had been publicized in the American press.

== September 7, 1927 (Wednesday) ==
- At his laboratory at 202 Green Street in San Francisco, Philo T. Farnsworth demonstrated the first completely electronic television system. Although mechanical television, using a rotating disk, had been created earlier by John Logie Baird, the hardware limited the picture to 10 frames per second and a 30-line image. Farnsworth's system used his invention of an image dissector, a scanning electronic tube, to convert an image into electromagnetic waves that were then transmitted from one room of his lab to a receiver in another, where the image was displayed. The first transmission was of a white line against a dark background. As the pane with the line was moved in front of the scanner, the image on the screen moved as well. In a brief telegram to his fellow investors, George Everson wrote "The damned thing works!"
- The University of Minas Gerais was founded in Brazil.
- Attempting a transatlantic crossing, the airplane Old Glory sent an S.O.S. before crashing into the ocean with aviators Lloyd W. Bertaud, James D. Hill and Philip Payne on board. The liner Transylvania picked up the signal and a search of the general area began. The wreckage of the Old Glory was found on September 12, 600 miles (970 km) northeast of Newfoundland, but the three fliers were never located.

== September 8, 1927 (Thursday) ==
- The Cessna-Roos Aircraft Company was incorporated by partners Clyde Cessna and Victor Roos. The corporation, credited with making well-manufactured, small airplanes affordable, would be renamed Cessna Aircraft Company on December 22.
- Japanese troops began their withdrawal from China's Shandong province, more than three months after troops began the occupation of Jinan.
- Sir Thomas Lipton retired as Chairman of Lipton's, Ltd., the tea company that he had founded.

== September 9, 1927 (Friday) ==
- Indiana Governor Edward L. Jackson, Marion County Republican chairman George V. Coffin, and Jackson's former legal partner Robert I. Marsh were indicted for conspiracy to commit a felony in an attempt to bribe for allegedly conspiring with Indiana Klan leader D. C. Stephenson to bribe then-Governor Warren T. McCray to appoint James E. McDonald as prosecutor of Marion County in 1923.
- The last federal delivery of air mail took place, as the Postmaster General completed transition of the service from government-owned airplanes to private contractors.

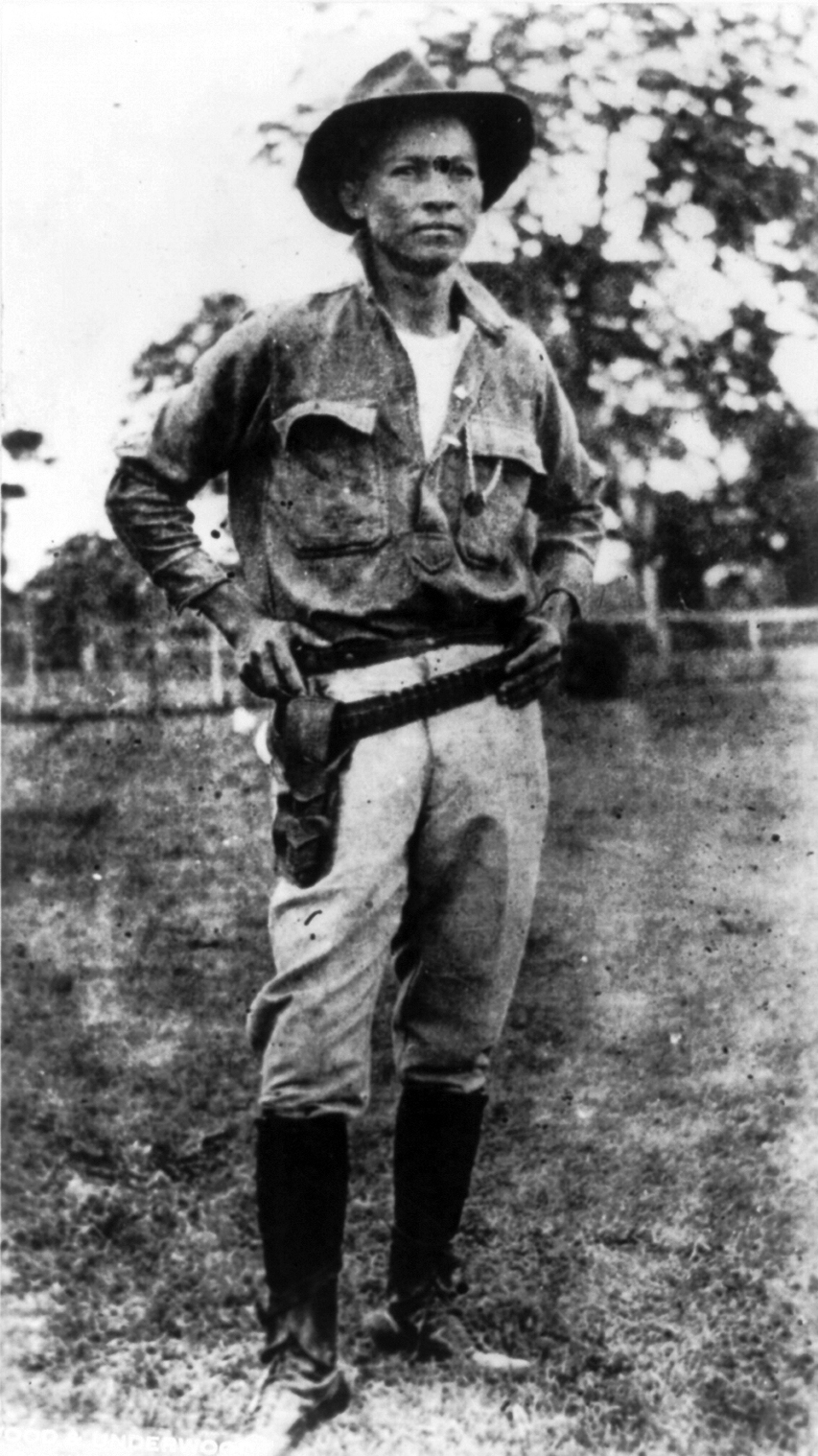
The original Sandinista

- Nicaraguan rebels, after regrouping under the command of Augusto Sandino, ambushed a group of U.S. Marines who were marching near the U.S. base at Las Flores.
- Gustav Stresemann, the Foreign Minister of Germany, pledged his nation's support for the outlawing of war at a meeting of the League of Nations in Geneva.
- The comedy horror film The Cat and the Canary directed by Paul Leni and starring Laura La Plante, Forrest Stanley and Creighton Hale was released.

== September 10, 1927 (Saturday) ==
- Dr. Morris Fishbein, editor of The Journal of the American Medical Association and secretary of the AMA, spoke out against recent American obsession with losing weight, saying that the "diet craze" had been "the menace of an anemic nation". Dr. Fishbein proclaimed that "If the false gospel of unscientific dieting continued to prevail for a few generations, the United States would become a nation of undersized weaklings and anemics, lacking in both physical and mental force."

== September 11, 1927 (Sunday) ==
- U.S. President Coolidge ended his three-month vacation, returning to Washington, D.C., after having been in South Dakota since June 15. The Coolidge family moved back into the newly remodeled White House for the first time since March 2.
- Born:
  - Vernon Corea, Sri Lankan broadcaster; in Kurana (d. 2002)
  - G. David Schine, American businessman and central figure in the Army-McCarthy Hearings; in Gloversville, New York (killed in plane crash, 1996)

== September 12, 1927 (Monday) ==
- U.S. Secretary of State Frank B. Kellogg warned the League of Nations that the United States would not abide by any ruling of the World Court over ownership of the Canal Zone. "American sovereignty over the Panama Canal is complete," said Kellogg. Panama, a member of the League, had asked that the question of American ownership of the Zone be decided by that body.
- Born: Pham Xuan An, South Vietnamese reporter for TIME Magazine who transmitted hundreds of classified documents to North Vietnam from 1952 to 1975; in Bien Hoa (d. 2006)

== September 13, 1927 (Tuesday) ==
- Triggered by an undersea earthquake, a 10-foot (3.0 m) high tsunami killed over 1,000 people in the coastal town of Nakamura, and 270 on the island of Kōjima. On the other side of the Pacific Ocean, the quake sent waves that killed hundreds of people in Salina Cruz and Manzanillo. The tremors and waves in Japan coincided with a typhoon that had killed hundreds of people in the Kumamoto Prefecture and the Nagasaki Prefecture.
- Heinrich Himmler issued SS Order Number One, setting out the culture for the elite Nazi unit, the Schutzstaffel. Drawn from the Sturmabteilung (SA) (literally storm division), the 200-member SS group was given its own distinctive uniform and paraded for a full inspection between Party meetings. The SS members also reported to Himmler on any indiscretions by other members of the SA.
- The New York Yankees clinched the American League pennant by defeating the Cleveland Indians in both games of a doubleheader by identical scores of 5–3 at Yankee Stadium.
- Gene Austin recorded My Blue Heaven, which would become the best-selling record in 1928.

== September 14, 1927 (Wednesday) ==
- A Kiss From Mary Pickford, directed by Sergei Komarov, premiered in Moscow. Soviet comedian Igor Ilyinsky appeared in the film with Douglas Fairbanks and Mary Pickford, who had visited the USSR in 1926 and were unaware that they were being filmed.
- In Nice, France, American celebrity Isadora Duncan was killed in a freak accident while being chauffeured in a car that she intended to purchase. The dancer was in a car on the Promenade Des Anglais, wearing a long scarf around her neck. As Benoit Falchetto began driving down the street, the cloth became entangled in one of the wheels, strangling Duncan, breaking her neck, and then hurling her out of the car. She was 50 years old.
- Bob Jones University opened with a revival service, then began its first classes (as Bob Jones College). Founded by evangelist Bob Jones, Sr., the two-year college began in College Point, Florida, with 88 students and 9 faculty. In 1933, it moved to Cleveland, Tennessee, and in 1947, to Greenville, South Carolina.
- The town of Tustin, California, narrowly approved incorporation as a city by a vote of 138 to 100. By 2011, the city had a population of more than 75,000.
- Died:
  - Hugo Ball, 41, German poet
  - Countess Sophie of Merenberg, 59

== September 15, 1927 (Thursday) ==
- Daniel R. Crissinger resigned as Chairman of the Federal Reserve Board, ten days after the Board had reduced the discount rate for Chicago banks from 4% to 3 1/2%. After Board member Edmund Platt temporarily acted as the Governor of the Fed, Roy A. Young became the new chief on September 22.
- William S. Brock and Edward F. Schlee abandoned their quest to become the first persons to fly an airplane around the world. The pair had set off from Harbour Grace, Newfoundland, on August 27 in the Pride of Detroit, and had gone halfway around the globe, landing in Japan at Omura, where their journey was halted by stormy weather. After friends and family convinced them that they risked death if they attempted to fly across the Pacific Ocean to Midway Island, Schlee and Brock made their final journey from Omura to Kasumigaura, then traveled back to the United States on a ship.
- Born: Rudolf Anderson, the only person to be killed in the Cuban Missile Crisis; in Spartanburg, South Carolina. USAF Major Anderson was killed on October 27, 1962, when his U-2 was shot down by a Cuban surface-to-air missile.

== September 16, 1927 (Friday) ==
- The complementarity principle of quantum physics was introduced by Niels Bohr at the International Congress of Physics in the Italian city of Como, where Bohr delivered his paper The Quantum Postulate and the Recent Development of Atomic Theory.
- Born:
  - Peter Falk, American actor best known for portraying the detective Lieutenant Columbo in the TV series Columbo; in New York City (d. 2011)
  - Sadako Ogata, United Nations High Commissioner for Refugees from 1991 to 2001; in Tokyo (d. 2019)
- Died: Elfie Fay, 47, American vaudeville actress

== September 17, 1927 (Saturday) ==
- Seven people were killed and five injured in what was, at the time, the deadliest airplane crash in history. The death toll would be exceeded on December 3, 1928, by the crash of a Brazilian plane that would kill fourteen people. The Fokker F.VII operated by Reynolds' Airways had been taking eleven passengers up for a brief sightseeing excursion from Hadley Field near South Plainfield, New Jersey, when the engine stalled at 500 feet (150 m) and the plane crashed into an orchard.
- Born:
  - George Blanda, National Football League quarterback, placekicker and Hall of Famer; in Youngwood, Pennsylvania (d. 2010)
  - Ted Weiss, Hungarian-born lawyer who became a U.S. citizen at age 26, and served as a U.S. Congressman for New York from 1977 until his death; in Gáva (now part of Gávavencsellő), Kingdom of Hungary (d. 1992)
  - Steve Ross, CEO of Time-Warner from 1989 to 1992; as Steven Rechnitz in Brooklyn (d. 1992)
- Died: Eugene Lamb Richards, 64, American football player, lawyer and politician

== September 18, 1927 (Sunday) ==
- The Columbia Phonographic Broadcasting System (later known as CBS) was formed and went on the air with a network of 16 radio stations in 11 U.S. states. Going on the air at 2:00 pm from Newark with music from the Howard Barlow Orchestra, it was the third national network, after NBC's Red Network and Blue Network. At 3:00, Donald Voorhees conducted dance music, and at 8:00 pm, Deems Taylor conducted the Metropolitan Opera presentation of The King's Henchman. In addition to the 16 network stations, the program was syndicated to another 58. Initially, CPBS programming was limited to 8-10 pm on Monday, Wednesday and Friday, and 2-4 pm and 7-10 pm on Sundays.
- The Tannenberg Memorial was unveiled at a ceremony at the site of the German victory over Russia during World War I in the Battle of Tannenberg, near the town of Hohenstein in East Prussia. Germany's President Paul von Hindenburg told his audience that Germany had not been the aggressor during the First World War, saying "With pure hearts we came to the defense of the Fatherland!"

== September 19, 1927 (Monday) ==
- The Trial of Mary Dugan began a successful run on Broadway of 437 performances, at the National Theatre, with Ann Harding in the title role. It would be presented in 1928 in London. The play was made into a 1929 film starring Norma Shearer and remade in 1941.
- The U.S. Marine garrison at Telpaneca, near the Rio Coco, was the victim of a lightning attack by Sandinista forces. One Marine was killed in the fighting, and another died of his wounds later.
- Born: Harold Brown, American physicist who served as U.S. Secretary of Defense from 1977 to 1981; in New York City (d. 2019)
- Died: Michael Ancher, 78, Danish impressionist painter

== September 20, 1927 (Tuesday) ==
- A fire at the Beauval Catholic Mission in Lac La Plonge, Saskatchewan, killed nineteen children and a nun.
- Born: Ed Temple, American pioneer in women's sports who developed the Tennessee State University women's track and field team members into Olympic athletes; in Harrisburg, Pennsylvania (d. 2016)

== September 21, 1927 (Wednesday) ==
- Province of Canary Islands of the Kingdom of Spain divided into Province of Santa Cruz de Tenerife and Province of Las Palmas.
- Born: Edwin Ardener, British anthropologist and historian (d. 1987)

== September 22, 1927 (Thursday) ==
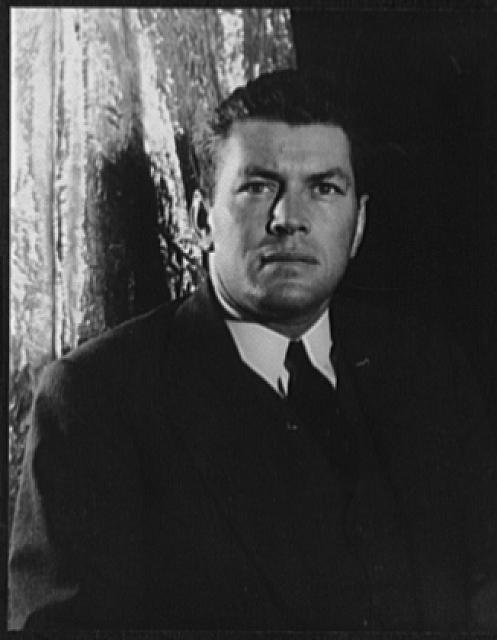
Tunney

- Tunney v. Dempsey and "The Long Count": Former heavyweight boxing champion Jack Dempsey sought to regain the title that he had lost in 1926 to Gene Tunney. The rematch took place at Chicago's Soldier Field before a crowd of 104,943 people, while another ninety million people listened to Graham McNamee's radio broadcast. Shortly after 10:00 pm Chicago time, the fight began; fifty seconds into the seventh round, Dempsey briefly knocked Tunney unconscious with six consecutive punches and was within ten seconds of regaining his crown. Dempsey made the mistake of not immediately following an order by referee Dave Barry to "Go to the farthest corner" away from Tunney, and Barry had to walk the challenger to the proper spot. Timekeeper Paul Beeler had already reached five when Barry raced over and restarted the count at one. Tunney regained consciousness as Beeler counted and stood to his feet by the count of nine, after having been face down for 14, and possibly 18 seconds. Tunney returned to action, finished the ten-round fight, and won by unanimous decisions of the judges. The gate set a record of $2,658,660 in sales, and Dempsey and Tunney split a prize of $1,540,445.
- Born:
  - Tommy Lasorda, manager of baseball's Los Angeles Dodgers from 1976 to 1996 and winner of two World Series; in Norristown, Pennsylvania (d. 2021)
  - Kika de la Garza, U.S. Congressman for Texas from 1965 to 1997; in Mercedes, Texas (d. 2017)

== September 23, 1927 (Friday) ==
- Sunrise: A Song of Two Humans, the first feature film to include a recorded soundtrack, premiered at the Times Square Theatre in New York City. The film was directed by F. W. Murnau, and used the Movietone sound system for synchronized music and sound effects. Preceding the first "talkie" (The Jazz Singer) by two weeks, Sunrise did not include recorded dialogue and still used silent film intertitles. The film was preceded by a Fox Movietone newsreel "in which the figurantes were heard as well as seen", including a "message of friendship" from Italian dictator Benito Mussolini, followed by "scenes of life in the Italian Army".
- The film Berlin: Die Sinfonie der Großstadt (Berlin: Symphony of the Great City), directed by Walter Ruttmann, premiered in Berlin.
- Born: Nguyễn Khoa Nam, ARVN General in IV Corps during the Vietnam War (1954-1975); in Da Nang, Vietnam, French Indochina (d. 1975)
- Died: Baron Adolf Von Maltzan, Germany's ambassador to the United States, in a Lufthansa airlines flight crash that killed four other people. Von Maltzan was flying from Berlin to Munich.

== September 24, 1927 (Saturday) ==
- The Assembly of the League of Nations unanimously adopted the Declaration on Aggression, resolving that aggressive war was an international crime punishable by League sanctions.

== September 25, 1927 (Sunday) ==
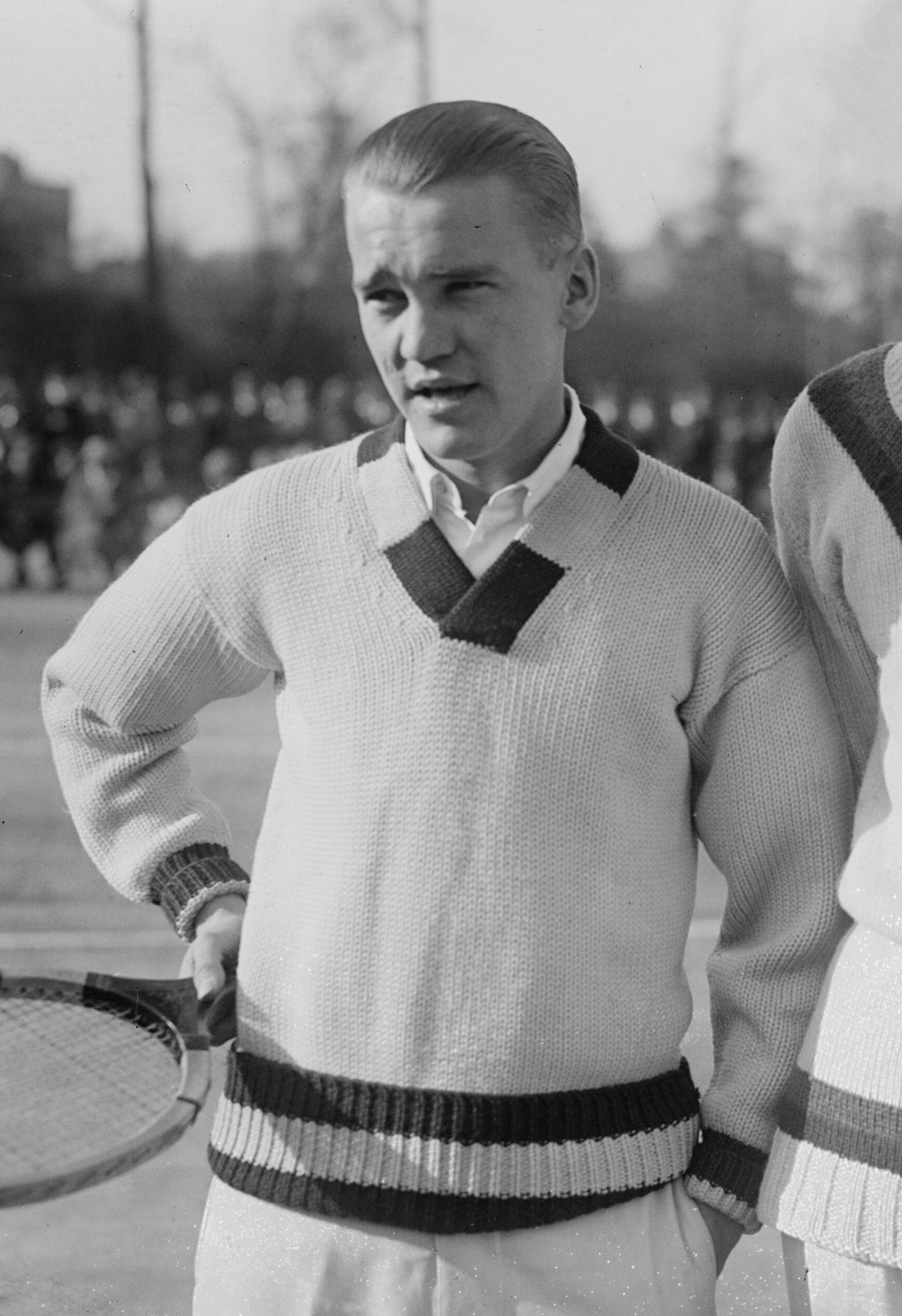
Richards

- Vinnie Richards became the first professional American tennis champion by defeating Howard Kinsey in the finals of the new U.S. Pro Tennis Championships. Richards and Kinsey were teammates and won the men's doubles title of the 1926 U.S. National Championship before turning professional at the end of the year. Richards beat Kinsey 11–9, 6-4 and 6–3 to win the Longue View trophy and the $1,000 prize (equivalent to more than $14,000 in 2018).
- The process of electric borehole logging, used to gather and make logs of data from wells as they were being drilled, was first used. The process, later very common in the industry, was performed at the Pechelbronn oil field in Alsace, France, by Marcel and Conrad Schlumberger.
- All of the low lands (der Unterland) in the tiny principality of Liechtenstein were flooded when the Rhine River overflowed its banks at Schaan, ruining most of the nation's farmers. Volunteers from around Europe helped in what was described later as "one of the first international relief operations in peacetime".
- Born: Colin Davis, English conductor; in Weybridge (d. 2013)

== September 26, 1927 (Monday) ==
- The Geneva Convention on the Execution of Foreign Arbitral Awards was signed. It took effect on July 25, 1929, and remains in force, although it was superseded by a 1958 treaty signed in New York.
- The Administrative Tribunal of the League of Nations was established.
- Born:
  - Robert Cade, American physician who led the research team that invented Gatorade; in San Antonio, Texas (d. 2007)
  - Romano Mussolini, Italian-born jazz pianist who was the son of Italian dictator Benito Mussolini; in Forlì (d. 2006)
  - Homer Ledford, American instrument maker nicknamed "The Stradivarius of the Dulcimer"; inventor of the dulcitar; in Alpine, Tennessee (d. 2006)

== September 27, 1927 (Tuesday) ==
- The discovery of a rich gold vein was made in the Gran Cordillera on the island of Luzon in the Philippines, by prospectors of the Benquet Consolidated Mining Company. By 1933, there were nearly 18,000 mining companies in the area, and by 1939, the Philippines was one of the world's leading gold producers.
- At about 3:30 am in Essex, England, career criminals Frederick Guy Browne and William Henry Kennedy killed Police Constable George Gutteridge, 35–36, shooting him in the face and in both eyes after he flagged down their stolen car as suspicious. A postman discovered Gutteridge's body at about 6 am. Browne and Kennedy would be arrested in January 1928 and executed by hanging on May 31, 1928.
- Leon Trotsky was expelled from the Comintern, as his power continued to decline. He would be expelled from the Soviet Communist Party the following month.
- I.G. Farben of Germany and Standard Oil of New Jersey entered a 25-year agreement providing the American oil company with access to German technology on crude oil hydrogenation.
- Groundbreaking took place for the George Washington Bridge on both sides of the Hudson River, at Manhattan and at Fort Lee, New Jersey, followed by speeches given on the steamer DeWitt Clinton, which had anchored in the middle of the river.
- The comedy-drama film College starring Buster Keaton was released.
- Born:
  - Steve Stavro, Canadian sports businessman, soccer league founder, and one-time owner of the NHL Toronto Maple Leafs and the NBA Toronto Raptors; as Manoli Stavroff Sholdas in Gabresh, Macedonia (d. 2006)
  - Chrysostomos I of Cyprus, Archbishop of Cyprus from 1977 to 2006; in Statos, British Cyprus (d. 2007)
  - Red Rodney (Robert Rodney Chudnick), American jazz musician; in Philadelphia (d. 1994)
- Died: Frank M. Canton, 76, former American outlaw

== September 28, 1927 (Wednesday) ==
- Babe Ruth tied his record of 59 home runs hit in 1921, hitting his 58th and 59th in the Yankees' 15–0 win over the visiting Washington Senators, and their pitcher, Horace Lisenbee.

== September 29, 1927 (Thursday) ==
- Seventy-nine people were killed and 550 were injured when a tornado struck the western part of St. Louis, Missouri. The twister struck at 1:00 in the afternoon, tearing through buildings, including St. Louis Central High School, where five students were killed and 16 injured.
- Born:
  - Adhemar da Silva, Brazilian athlete, twice holder of world record for the triple jump in the 1950s, Olympic gold medalist in 1952 and 1956; in São Paulo (d. 2001)
  - Jean Baker Miller, pioneering American feminist, psychiatrist, and social activist; author of Toward a New Psychology of Women; in New York City (d. 2006)
- Died: Willem Einthoven, 67, Dutch inventor of the electrocardiogram, winner of the Nobel Prize in 1924

== September 30, 1927 (Friday) ==
- Babe Ruth broke his own record for most home runs in a season (59) by hitting his 60th home run, a record that would stand until 1961. The run came in the 8th inning of the penultimate game of the season. Pitcher Tom Zachary had thrown one ball and one strike, when Ruth hit the ball into the bleachers and gave the New York Yankees a 4–2 win over the Washington Senators.
- Born: W. S. Merwin, American poet; in New York City (d. 2019)
