= Hearts of the Dulcimer =

- DVD front cover
- Directed by: Patricia Delich; Wayne Jiang
- Release date: April 7, 2013 (Ozark Hills Film Festival)
- Country: United States

Hearts of the Dulcimer is a 2013 independent documentary film focusing on the Appalachian dulcimer, and particularly its role in the 1960s California counterculture, through interviews with builders and players of this musical instrument. The film was written and directed by Patricia Delich and Wayne Jiang.

The film premiered at the 2013 Ozark Hills Film Festival.

== Overview ==
Hearts of the Dulcimer tells the story of the mountain dulcimer boom that started in the late 1960s in California. To provide context for those not familiar with the dulcimer (a fretted string instrument of the zither family), the film starts out with historical information illustrated with archival footage and stories about a few of the early builders and players in the Appalachian Mountains. The main focus of this documentary is the little-known story of the California dulcimer boom. It is told through the eyes of those who lived during that era and who had a major influence on the dulcimer in California.

Telling the story of the rise and fall (and potential comeback) of the mountain dulcimer in California, Hearts of the Dulcimer is illustrated by past and present musical performances, and players and builders reminiscing.

CapriTaurus dulcimer crew in the Santa Cruz Mountains.

== Cast ==
- Michael Rugg: one of the primary people responsible for the dulcimer boom in California and one of the top dulcimer players in the 1970s and 1980s. He co-founded CapriTaurus and Folk Roots Dulcimers with his brother Howard Rugg. Many people purchased their first dulcimer from Michael at the Renaissance Faire.
- Howard Rugg: one of the premiere dulcimer builders in California during the 1970s and 1980s. He co-founded CapriTaurus and Folk Roots Dulcimers with his brother Michael Rugg. With his mastery of woodworking, Howard turned a small shop in the Santa Cruz Mountains into one of the largest dulcimer-making businesses in the world.
- Joellen Lapidus: one of the pioneers of contemporary mountain dulcimer playing, songwriting, and instrument construction. She introduced the dulcimer to Joni Mitchell and made three instruments for her between 1968 and 1976. Joellen builds dulcimers and teaches in West Los Angeles.
- Neal Hellman: a nationally acclaimed performer and teacher of the mountain dulcimer. He has been active in performing, writing, teaching, and recording acoustic music for the past 30 years. Neal is founder, director, and one of the primary artists on the Gourd Music record label.

Additional musical performances, recordings, or commentary
Ron Beardslee, Laura Devine Burnett, Bonnie Carol, Albert d’Ossché, Patricia Delich, Robert Force, Paul Furnas, Bill Haines, Gary Horsman, Janet Herman, Stephen Jackel, Lucy Long, Cyndi Menzel, Joni Mitchell, Aaron O’Rourke, Steve Palazzo, Jean Ritchie, Peter Tommerup, Wendy Treat.
