= Robert Force =

- Born: Snohomish, Washington, United States
- Occupation(s): Musician, composer, music producer, author, teacher
- Instrument: Appalachian dulcimer
- Website: robertforce.com

Robert Force (born in Snohomish, Washington) is a performer and composer on Appalachian dulcimer. He is also a producer, and the author of In Search of the Wild Dulcimer, Wild Dulcimer Songbook, and Pacific Rim Dulcimer Songbook.

== Discography ==
=== As principal recording artist ===
Pacific Rim Dulcimer Project, Crossover, The Art of Dulcimer, When the Moon Fell on California, Manitou: In the Garden of the Gods, Did You

=== As guest recording artist ===
Hellman: Dulcimer Duets, Hellman: Dulcimer Aires, Ballads and Bears, Einhorn: Whole World Round, Stephens: Under the Porchlight

=== As producer ===
Year	Artists	Album	Label	Catalog #
1981	Rugg	Celtic Collection for Dulcimer	Kicking Mule Records	KM223
1981	Hellman	Appalachian Dulcimer Duets	Kicking Mule Records	KM222
1981	Caswell/Carnahan	New Leaves	Kicking Mule Records	KM313
1982	Hellman	Dulcimer Airs, Ballads and Bears	Kicking Mule Records	KM320
1982	Caswell/Carnahan	Borderlands	Kicking Mule Records	KM316
1983	Einhorn	Whole World Round	Kicking Mule Records	KM321
1983	Isle of Skye	Isle of Skye	Kicking Mule Records	KM234
1983	Various Artists	Pastime with Good Company	Kicking Mule Records	KM225
1983	Murphy	Timpan	Kicking Mule Records	KM233
1984	Weis	Hologram	Kicking Mule Records	KM178
1984	McClure	Transition	BAM Records	BAMJ1001
1985	Banish Misfortune	Through the Hourglass	Kicking Mule Records	KM319
1985	Stavis	Morning Mood	Aspen Records	APN 30201
2003	Stephens	Under the Porch Light	Blaine Street Records	BSR304
2005	Ross	The Moonshiner's Atlas	Blaine Street Records	BSR307
2008	Manitou	In the Garden of the Gods	Blaine Street Records	BSR309
2013	Force	Did You	Blaine Street Records	BSR151

== See also ==
- List of Appalachian dulcimer players
