= Dulcitar =

The dulcitar is a variant of the Appalachian dulcimer, which retains the dulcimer's diatonic fret layout yet features a long neck that is intended to be played upright in the guitar style rather than flat across the lap. Luthier Homer Ledford coined the word dulcitar as a portmanteau of dulcimer and guitar, building his first model of the instrument around 1971. One of Ledford's dulcitars was accepted into the permanent collection of the Smithsonian Institution, as well as displayed in a traveling exhibit on American craftsmanship.

The term "dulcitar" was trademarked by Ledford in 1976 (#73075051), and other luthiers have developed conceptually similar instruments under other names such as "strumstick" and "pickin' stick".

== See also ==
- Resonator dulcimer
- Banjo dulcimer
