= List of Appalachian dulcimer players =

The following is list of musicians who play (or played) the Appalachian dulcimer as a primary instrument or who have used a mountain dulcimer in their work.

== Musicians who play the dulcimer as a primary instrument ==
Musicians who play (or played) the Appalachian dulcimer as a primary instrument.

- Richard Fariña
- Robert Force. Pioneer of the standing up, overhand style of playing
- Bing Futch won the "Best Guitar" (Solo/Duo) award at the 2016 International Blues Challenge while competing on the mountain dulcimer. He has released numerous albums, published instructional books for the instrument and performs regularly at festivals and music venues across the United States. He is from Orlando Florida.
- Margaret MacArthur, folk music historian, musician and dulcimer instructor, introduced the mountain dulcimer to many folk musicians in the 1960s.
- Guitarist John Pearse, an early British enthusiast of the mountain dulcimer, was one of the first to introduce the dulcimer to English folk clubs in the 1960s.
- Randy Raine-Reusch released numerous recordings of dulcimer before he played "Dulcimer Stomp" on the Aerosmith album Pump (1989). He recorded another version of "Dulcimer Stomp" on his world fusion group's self titled album ASZA (1995). He has recently re-released four early recordings featuring the dulcimer.
- Jean Ritchie
- Kevin Roth
- Nashville-based David Schnaufer recorded with The Judds, Kathy Mattea, Johnny Cash, and Mark O'Connor. Schnaufer was a historian of the instrument and the world's first dulcimer professor; he served as Adjunct Associate Professor of Dulcimer at Vanderbilt University's Blair School of Music from 1995 to his death in 2006.
- Stephen Seifert of Nashville. A popular presence at American folk music festivals, Seifert also performs with classical symphonies around the United States.
- Virgil Sturgill, active in the 1950s.

== Musicians who have used a mountain dulcimer in their work ==
- Joni Mitchell played a dulcimer on the 1971 album Blue and included a dulcimer set in many of her live performances. She is credited with popularizing the instrument outside of US folk music circles in the 1970s.
- Many British folk-rock groups of the late 1960s and early 1970s featured the mountain dulcimer, including:

- Battlefield Band
- Pentangle
- Fairport Convention
- Steeleye Span (Tim Hart frequently played electric dulcimer on the band's early albums, most prominently on Hark! The Village Wait (1970) and Please to See the King (1971))
- Strawbs

- Cyndi Lauper plays the mountain dulcimer on A Night to Remember (1989), Sisters of Avalon (1996), "Time After Time" live at The Martha Stewart Show The Body Acoustic (2005) and Avo Session (2008).
- Bruce Hornsby in a 2016 album Rehab Reunion an album he said was dedicated to the mountain dulcimer.
- Jeff Buckley played a dulcimer in his song Dream Brother featured on his record Grace, released in 1994.
- Joe Perry recorded with a dulcimer on Aerosmith's Get a Grip album (1993).
- The group Little Big Town used the dulcimer on their second album, The Road to Here.
- Rob McMaken of Dromedary plays the dulcimer in gypsy styles.
- Amanda Barrett of The Ditty Bops is also known to play the dulcimer.
- Buddy Woodward of The Dixie Bee-Liners regularly uses the dulcimer as a Nashville-based session musician.
- The cello-rock band Rasputina has employed the dulcimer on their albums Frustration Plantation and Oh Perilous World! and the band's lead member Melora Creager has used the dulcimer on her solo album Perplexions, released in late 2006.
- Jerusalem-based multi-instrumentalist Bradley Fish's dulcimer loops on Sony Digital Pictures are popular. Fish became known for using the instrument with an Eastern-influenced style and electronic effects on his 1996 collaboration "The Aquarium Conspiracy" with Sugarcubes/Björk drummer Sigtryggur Baldursson.
- Singer-songwriter Holly Brook plays the dulcimer on her debut album Like Blood, Like Honey.
- Peter Buck of R.E.M.
- A dulcimer is played on Nine Inch Nails' album Ghosts I–IV on song "22 Ghosts III" by Alessandro Cortini.
- Mark Duplass played the Ryan Miller (musician) song "Big Machine" on a dulcimer in movie Safety Not Guaranteed.
- Patrick Wolf
- Jimmy Page (used on "That's the Way," Rough Mix with Dulcimer & Backwards Echo)
- David Massengill
- Vivian Campbell of Def Leppard
- Laura Marling
- Rich Mullins
- Kevin Roth
- An Appalachian dulcimer is prominent in the Rolling Stones songs "Lady Jane" and I Am Waiting; it was played by Brian Jones (1942-1969) of the Rolling Stones.
- Harry Styles, inspired by Joni Mitchell, features a dulcimer in his song “Canyon Moon” (2019).

== See also ==
- Lists of musicians
