= Sturgill =

Sturgill is a given name or a surname.

Sturgill or Sturgills may refer to:

- Sturgill Simpson (born 1978), American country music and roots rock singer-songwriter
- Virgil Sturgill (1897-?), American ballad singer and dulcimer player
- Sturgills, North Carolina, an unincorporated community
