= Robin Petrie =

Robin Petrie is an American santur and hammered dulcimer player. Petrie has been performing popular and seldom-heard hammered dulcimer music since 1980. She is heard regularly on National Public Radio. Though focusing initially on British Isles and French music, her current work includes music from many cultures around the globe.

Petrie owns but does not actually play an 1875 Mackenzie piano harp, patented and built in Minneapolis along the lines of a small spinet. About 30 Mackenzie piano harps are known to survive today. She actually plays an instrument built by the Texas maker, Russell Cook, and a santur made in Athens, Greece.

She lives in northern California.

== Discography ==
Solo albums

- A Victorian Christmas - Gourd Music
- A Victorian Noel - Gourd Music

Performer

- Panacea - Songs and Dances of Europe East and West (2005)
- Beautiful Dreamer - The Songs of Stephen Foster (Emergent label) 2004 Grammy Award winner
- Oktober County
- Dream of the Manatee
- Simple Gifts
- The World Turned Upside Down
- Tree of Life
- Autumn in the Valley
- Wondrous Love

With Danny Carnahan

- Cut and Run
- Two for the Road (Flying Fish Records, 1984)
- Continental Drift (Flying Fish,1987)
- Journeys of the Heart (Celtoid, 1989)
- No Regrets (DNA Records, 1989)
- Cut And Run (Red House Records, 1995)
