= Cheryl Ann Fulton =

American harpist

Cheryl Ann Fulton is an American harpist. Fulton performs, records, teaches, and researches the harp. She is a performer of historical harps, and one of the few harpists to play triple harp, medieval harp, and lever harps.

Fulton has performed on over thirty albums and soundtracks broadly ranging from medieval, baroque, orchestral, and contemporary music to Celtic music and film scores, on records labels such as PolyGram, Koch International Classics, Nonesuch, Gourd Music, and others. Her first solo album, The Airs of Wales, brought her recognition. She is a composer as well as a performer, and her original compositions from her second solo album, The Once & Future Harp (Gourd Music), have been featured on National Public Radio.

== Career ==
Fulton earned a B.S. degree in pedal harp, and an M.M. and D.M. in early music/historical harp from the School of Music of Indiana University, Bloomington. Her doctoral thesis on the history of the triple harp won her the Burton E. Adams Prize for Academic Research. Fulton is a Fulbright scholar who, in 1987, received a Fulbright Award for research and performance in Lisbon, Portugal, where she served as principal harpist for Portugal's orchestra, the Orchestre Gulbenkian. She is a contributing scholar for the new edition of the New Grove Dictionary of Music and Musicians and has written a chapter for A Performers Guide to Medieval Music.

Fulton was the producer, director, and featured performer with her Celtic harp group The White Horse Harpers, on the 2001 recording Christmas in an Irish Castle. A founding member of Ensemble Alcatraz, she has worked with many professional ensembles including Anonymous 4, Sequentia, Les Idees Heureuses, American Bach Soloists, The Boston Camerata, and Chanticleer. With her friend Diana Stork, she performs in the duo Twin Harps. She founded and directs the medieval harp choir Angelorum and is the founding president of the Historical Harp Society.

Her music is also featured in the video game Braid.
