= Kevin Roth =

American singer (born December 1 1957)

- Born: 1957 (age 68–69); Philadelphia, Pennsylvania, U.S.
- Occupations: Singer-songwriter, pianist, artist, mountain dulcimer player
- Years active: 1975–present

Kevin Roth (born 1957 in Philadelphia, Pennsylvania) is a singer-songwriter, pianist, artist, and Mountain Dulcimer player. He is widely known as one of the leading innovators of the dulcimer around the world and has released 40 albums. Kevin Roth is best known for performing the theme song to the children's television series Shining Time Station, which was written and composed by Joe Raposo. The program aired on PBS for three seasons, spanning 65 half-hour episodes between January 29, 1989, and June 11, 1993. His latest recording (to date) is "The Deviant Dulcimerist," released on the Star Gazer Productions label. A full biography and more information can be found online at www.kevinrothmusic.com.

== Discography ==
- 1975: Kevin Roth Sings and Plays Dulcimer
- 1976: The Other Side of the Mountain
- 1976: Somebody Give Me Direction
- 1977: The Mountain Dulcimer Instrumental Album
- 1978: The First Few Words: Mountain Dulcimer Instrumental Album, Vol. 2
- 1979: Dulcimer Instruction Album
- 1980: New Wind
- 1981: The Living and the Breathing Wind
- 1981: Women
- 1982: Dulcimer Man
- 1982: The Quiet Times
- 1983: Don't Wait For Me and Songs of the First Decade
- 1985: Lullabies for Little Dreamers
- 1986: Voyages
- 1986: Unbearable Bears
- 1988: The Sandman
- 1990: Dinosaurs And Dragons
- 1992: The Gentleness In Living
- 1992: The Toy Maker's Christmas
- 1994: Travel Song Sing Alongs
- 1995: Adventures of Sir Rabbit & Bunny Junction
- 1996: Now I Lay Me Down to Sleep
- 1997: Train Songs & Other Tracks
- 1998: Train Song Sing Alongs
- 2000: Celtic Harp & Other Lullabies (with Janet Jackson Witman)
- 2002: Mozart & Me (with Janet Jackson Beily)
- 2003: Children's First Songs
- 2003: The Sunflower Collection
- 2004: Searching For Angels
- 2004: Music Of The Soul Zither
- 2005: Animal Songs For Children
- 2007: Wabby Wabbit's Lullabies and Snuggle Songs
- 2007: Folk Songs For Little Folks
- 2009: Autoharp Songs and Solos
- 2011: My Quiet Times: Hammer Dulcimer Lullaby Instrumentals
- 2015: Awakenings
- 2016: Reawakening
- 2019: The Deviant Dulcimerist
- 2023: Songs from the Book Between the Notes
- 2023: Dulcimer Dreamland
- 2024: The Inside Job
