= Virgil Sturgill =

Virgil Sturgill (born 1897 in Carter County, Kentucky) was a ballad singer and dulcimer player. He was a friend of Cratis Williams. His performances were recorded in "Southern Mountain Folksongs and Ballads" (1955) and "Bury Me Beneath the Willow: A Treasury of Southern Mountain Folksongs and Ballads" (1950s). Eastern Kentucky University contains his collection, "Summer in Kentucky and other poems" (1928).

The Library of Congress possesses the following recording by Sturgill: One 10-inch tape of songs sung with dulcimer accompaniment by Virgil L. Sturgill, originally of Sutton's Branch, Kentucky. Recorded at the Library of Congress by Herman Norwood, June 1951. (1 hour; LWO 1821).
