= Homer Ledford =

American musician and instrument maker

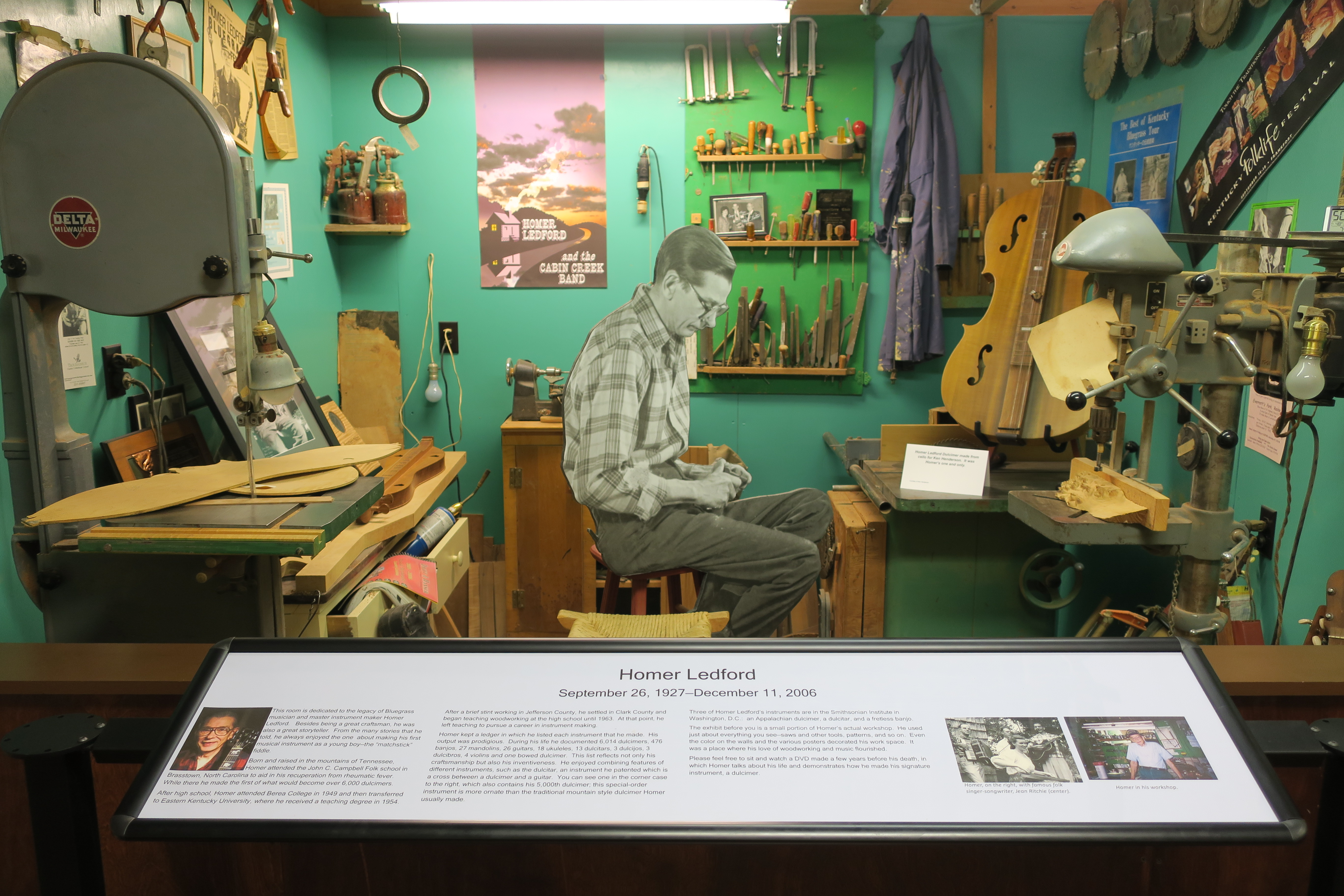
Homer Ledford exhibit in the Bluegrass Heritage Museum (Winchester, Kentucky)

Homer C. Ledford (September 26, 1927 – December 11, 2006) was an instrument maker and bluegrass musician from Kentucky He is best known for his craftsmanship in building dulcimers.

== Early life and education ==
Homer was born in Alpine, Tennessee, into a family that valued craftsmanship and music. He showed an early interest in building instruments, learning his craft through hands-on experience and from local makers. When he was 18, Ledford was given a scholarship to attend the John C. Campbell Folk School in Brasstown, North Carolina. He later attended Berea College, where he met his wife Colista. Ledford eventually transferred and graduated from what is now the Eastern Kentucky University in 1954. Ledford worked as a high school industrial arts teacher at George Rogers Clark High School in Winchester, Kentucky before becoming a full-time instrument maker.

== Career and instrument making ==
Musicians from all over the world have sought after his dulcimers, banjos, mandolins, guitars and ukuleles. Ledford's instruments were known for their superior craftsmanship and attention to detail, and his influence on the world of traditional folk and bluegrass music remains profound. Some of his instruments are on permanent display at the. Smithsonian Institution.

According to his website, he made over 5,776 dulcimers and over 475 banjos in his lifetime. He is also the inventor of the dulcitar, and also made dulcijos and dulcibros. Ledford was also a skilled innovator in instrument design. In addition to the dulcitar, he experimented with creating new variations of traditional instruments. These innovations continue to inspire modern-day luthiers and musicians, especially within the bluegrass and Appalachian music scenes.

== Musical contributions and The Cabin Creek Band ==
While his work as an instrument maker was central to his career, Ledford was also an active bluegrass musician. He played in the Cabin Creek Band, a significant Kentucky-based group that was known for its preservation of Appalachian folk music traditions. His dual role as both a musician and instrument maker allowed him to understand music from both a technical and artistic perspective.

Ledford's involvement with the Cabin Creek Band. further cemented his reputation as a key figure in Kentucky's bluegrass scene. The band performed locally and contributed to the region's rich tradition of folk and bluegrass music.

== Recognition and awards ==
He was also an original inductee in the Kentucky Stars, alongside Loretta Lynn, Rosemary Clooney, Bobbie Ann Mason, and Patricia Neal. A sidewalk plaque honoring him is in front of the Kentucky Theatre on Main Street in Lexington, Kentucky. He also published a book of autobiographical stories and poems, entitled See Ya Further Up the Creek.

== Personal life ==
Ledford died from a stroke at the age of 79 in Winchester, Kentucky. He was survived by his widow, Colista; they had four children. His great nephews Jason Eubanks, Phillip Eubanks, and Jonathan Armak are currently in the experimental group Unstable, and use many of the instruments he made on their records. Their mother, Melissa Armak (born Melissa Fraley) was the bass player in the Cabin Creek Band during the late 1970s.

== Legacy ==
Ledford was posthumously given an honorary Doctorate of Humanities at the Fall 2006 commencement ceremonies at Eastern Kentucky University, December 16, 2006, and deemed one of Kentucky's "Heroes, Saints and Legends" by Wesley Retirement Community in recognition of his contributions to music.

== Sources ==
- Alvey, R. Gerald, Dulcimer Maker, The Craft of Homer Ledford, University Press of Kentucky, 1984
- The Mudcat Café Obituary
- Lexington Herald-Leader - Obituary & Photo
