= Bowed dulcimer =

Musical Instrument

The bowed dulcimer is a musical instrument. Designed in the style of the Appalachian dulcimer (a fretted string instrument of the zither family, typically with three or four strings), it is either a standard instrument played with a violin bow, or a purpose-built dulcimer designed around bow playing. The purpose-designed instrument is described as resembling a hybrid between a dulcimer and a cello or viola da gamba.

Bowing as a technique of playing the standard dulcimer has some historical roots; L. Allen Smith feature several examples in his historical survey A Catalogue of Pre-Revival Appalachian Dulcimers (1983).

The more modern purpose-built version of the instrument was developed by Kenneth Bloom of Pilot Mountain, North Carolina in the late 1990s.
