= Gourd Music =

American record label

Gourd Music is a record label featuring acoustic instrumental music with various ensembles of guitar, cello, flute, oboe, harp, fiddle, hammered and mountain dulcimer, banjo and mandolin.

Gourd Music was founded by Neal Hellman in 1988.

Genres published include Shaker music, music of Colonial America, Victorian music and music of the American Civil War. Gourd albums range in style from traditional Celtic to old-time Appalachian; from galliards to jigs; from monasteries to mountain cabins; from courtly measures to rollicking sprees.

== Gourd artists ==
- William Coulter
- Cheryl Ann Fulton
- Neal Hellman
- Mary McLaughlin
- Robin Petrie
- Barry Phillips
- Shelley Phillips
- Todd Phillips
- Kim Robertson
- Martin Simpson
- Jim Taylor

== See also ==
- List of record labels
