= Neal Hellman =

American folk musician, music teacher, and performer

Neal Hellman (born April 13, 1948, in New York, New York) is an American folk musician, music teacher, and performer of the mountain dulcimer. He has been active in performing, writing, teaching and recording acoustic music for the past thirty years throughout the United States and Europe.

In collaboration with Joe Weed, Hellman wrote the score for Princess Furball, a children's video by Weston Woods which won a 1993 American Library Association Commendation.

An original composition, written by Neal and performed by Jay Ungar and Molly Mason, is featured on the Ken Burns production "The Story of Susan B Anthony and Elizabeth Cady Stanton" which was broadcast on PBS across the United States in the fall of 1999.

He has written books on the Appalachian dulcimer, including It's A Dulcimer Life, The Dulcimer Chord Book, The Hal Leonard Dulcimer Method, Beatles Dulcimer Book and The Music of the Shakers For Mountain Dulcimer on Mel Bay Publications.

As founder, director and one of the primary artists of the Gourd Music record label, Hellman has produced over thirty albums, including Simple Gifts, Tree of Life, The Fairie Round, Tender Shepherd, The World Turned Upside Down and A Victorian Christmas.

== Discography ==
- Oktober County (1988) – Gourd Music
- Dream of the Manatee (with Joe Weed) (1989) – Gourd Music
- Autumn in the Valley (1993) – Gourd Music
- Emma's Waltz (2007) – Gourd Music
