= Banjo dulcimer =

Stringed musical instrument

A banjo dulcimer is an Appalachian dulcimer modified by adding a vibrating membrane to the body of the instrument. This changes the tone and volume of the instrument, operating on the same principle as the banjo.

Homer Ledford, a luthier during the early part of the revival of the dulcimer, built several banjo dulcimers, which he called the dulcijo (a portmanteau of dulcimer and banjo).

== Makers of banjo dulcimers ==
- Doug Thomson (banjomer.com) has been producing banjo dulcimers since 1980 - called "Banjo-Mer"
- McSpadden Dulcimers began producing banjo dulcimers in the early 2000s.
- Mike Clemmer produces a banjo dulcimer called "ban-jammer"
- Dennis DenHartog (folknotes.com) has been building a solid frame banjo dulcimer called the "Banj-Mo" since spring, 2001.

== See also ==
- Banjo mandolin
- Banjo ukulele
- Banjo guitar
