= Resonator dulcimer =

Musical instrument

The resonator dulcimer is an Appalachian dulcimer which features a metal resonating cone inset in the body, which receives and acoustically amplifies the vibration of the strings. The first instrument was conceived in 1977 and completed in 1979 by dulcimer luthier Homer Ledford, who called it a "dulcibro" (portmanteau of "dulcimer" and "dobro").

Unlike resonator guitars, resonator ukuleles, and resonator mandolins, the resonator dulcimer was never commercially produced on a large scale.
