= Appalachian dulcimer =

Fretted string instrument

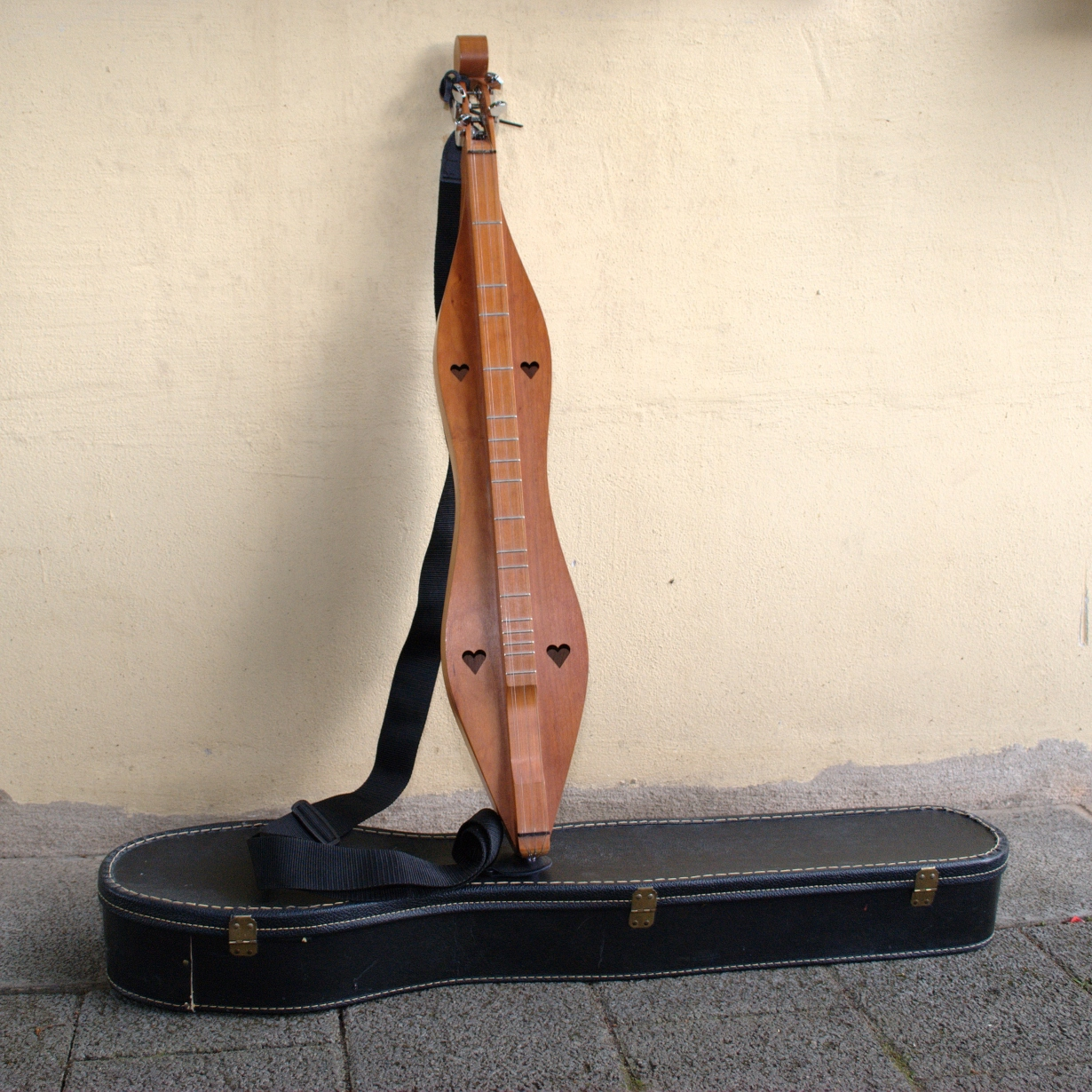
- Other names: dulcimer, mountain dulcimer, lap dulcimer, fretted dulcimer, dulcimore, etc.
- Classification: Plucked string fretted zither; Hornbostel-Sachs: 314.122-5

Playing range
- Typical modern: D3-D6 (diatonic)

Related instruments
- Epinette des Vosges (France); Hummel (instrument) (Sweden, Netherlands); Langeleik (Norway); Langspil (Iceland); Monochord; Scheitholt (Germany); Zither (Austria, Germany); Kokle (Latvia)

Musicians
- List of Appalachian dulcimer players

The Appalachian dulcimer (many variant names; see below) is a fretted string instrument of the zither family, typically with three or four strings, originally played in the Appalachian region of the United States.

The body extends the length of the fingerboard, and its fretting is generally diatonic.

== Name ==
The Appalachian dulcimer has many variant names. Most often it is simply called a dulcimer (also rendered as "dulcimore", "dulcymore", "delcimer", "delcimore", etc.).

When it needs to be distinguished from the unrelated hammered dulcimer, various adjectives are added (drawn from location, playing style, position, shape, etc.). Example: mountain dulcimer, Kentucky dulcimer, plucked dulcimer, fretted dulcimer, lap dulcimer, teardrop dulcimer, box dulcimer, etc.

The instrument has also acquired a number of nicknames (some shared by other instruments): "harmonium", "hog fiddle", "music box", "harmony box", and "mountain zither".

== Origins and history ==
Although the Appalachian dulcimer first appeared in the early 19th century among Scotch-Irish immigrant communities in the Appalachian Mountains, the instrument has no known precedent in Ireland, Scotland or Northern England. Because of this, and a dearth of written records, the history of the Appalachian dulcimer has been, until fairly recently, largely speculative. Since 1980, more extensive research has traced the instrument's development through several distinct periods, and its likely origins in several similar European instruments: the Swedish hummel, the Norwegian langeleik, the German scheitholt, and the French épinette des Vosges. Folk historian Lucy M. Long said of the instrument's history:

Because few historical records of the dulcimer exist, the origins of the instrument were open to speculation until recently when Ralph Lee Smith and L. Alan Smith reconstructed the instrument's history by analyzing older dulcimers. The organological development of the dulcimer divides into three periods: transitional (1700 to mid-1800s), pre-revival or traditional (mid-1800s to 1940), and revival or contemporary (after 1940).

Charles Maxson, an Appalachian luthier from Volga, West Virginia, speculated that early settlers were unable to make the more complex violin in the early days because of lack of tools and time. This was one of the factors which led to the building of the dulcimer, which has less dramatic curves. He too cited the langeleik, scheitholt and épinette des Vosges as ancestor instruments.

Few true specimens of the mountain dulcimer exist from earlier than about 1880, when J. Edward Thomas of Knott County, Kentucky, began building and selling them. The instrument became used as something of a parlor instrument, as its modest sound volume is best suited to small home gatherings. But for the first half of the 20th century the mountain dulcimer was rare, with a handful of makers supplying players in scattered pockets of Appalachia. Virtually no audio recordings of the instrument exist from earlier than the late 1930s.

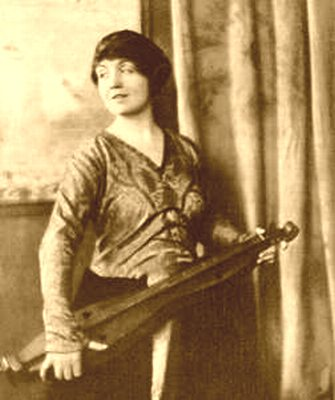
Loraine Wyman, who gathered folk songs in the field and performed them in concert halls, shown in the May 1, 1917, issue of Vogue holding an Appalachian dulcimer

The soprano Loraine Wyman, who sang Appalachian folk songs in concert venues around the time of the First World War, created a brief splash for the Appalachian dulcimer by demonstrating it in concerts and was portrayed in Vogue magazine (right) holding her instrument, a Thomas. But Wyman preferred singing with the more robust support of the piano. The instrument achieved its true renaissance in the 1950s urban folk music revival in the United States through the work of Jean Ritchie, a Kentucky musician who performed with the instrument before New York City audiences. In the early 1960s, Ritchie and her husband George Pickow began distributing dulcimers made by her Kentucky relative Jethro Amburgey, then the woodworking instructor at the Hindman Settlement School. They eventually began producing their own instruments in New York City. Meanwhile, the American folk musician Richard Fariña (1937–1966) was also bringing the Appalachian dulcimer to a much wider audience, and by 1965 the instrument was a familiar presence in folk music circles.

In addition to Amburgey, by then winding down his production, influential builders of the mid-1960s included Homer Ledford, Lynn McSpadden, A.W. Jeffreys and Joellen Lapidus.

In 1969, Michael and Howard Rugg formed a company called Capritaurus. As well as being the first to mass-produce the instrument, they made design changes to make the instrument easier to produce and to play. The body was made larger, and they installed metal friction or geared tuners, rather than traditional wooden pegs, to make tuning easier and more reliable.

== Construction and form ==
Organologically, the Appalachian dulcimer is a plucked box-zither; it is considered to be a folk instrument. Appalachian dulcimers are traditionally constructed of wood, and early instruments were typically made all of one wood, using wood commonly found in the particular area of the mountains where the builder lived. More recently, guitar aesthetics and construction ideals have been applied, with a tone wood such as spruce or cedar preferred for the top of the soundbox. A harder wood, such as mahogany or rosewood, will be used for the back, sides, and neck, and a hardwood such as rosewood, maple, or ebony is used for the fingerboard. As the modern dulcimer arose in America, and the bulk of them are still made there, American hardwoods such as walnut, oak, cherry, and apple are also still frequently employed by makers.

As with many folk instruments, the Appalachian dulcimer has been made – and continues to be made – in many shapes, sizes, and variations in construction details; however, certain forms have proven more popular than others, and tend to predominate. The general format has a long narrow soundbox, with the "neck" centered in the soundbox and running the length of the instrument. Typical instruments are 70–100 cm (27 1/2–39 1/2 in.) long, 16–19 cm (6 1/2–7 1/2 in) wide at the widest bout, and the soundbox has a uniform depth of about 5–6 cm (2–2.5 in). The top of the fingerboard sits about 1.25 cm (1/2 in) above the top of the soundbox. The soundbox will typically have from two to four soundholes, two in the lower bout and two in the upper bout. These take various shapes, with traditional favorites being a heart, or the traditional "f-hole" of the violin, but makers frequently personalize their instruments with their own unique soundhole shapes.

The overall shape of the instrument has taken many forms, but the most popular are the hourglass (or figure 8), the ellipse, the teardrop, and a long narrow trapezoid or rectangle.

At one end of the neck is the headstock, which contains the tuners. Headstocks most commonly have either a scroll shape (similar to the headstock of orchestral string instruments such as the violin) or a shape similar to that found on parlour guitars or banjos. To some extent, the shape of the headstock may be dictated by the style of tuners chosen. Older instruments and some modern "traditional" designs use violin-style wooden friction pegs. Modern instruments will more typically employ metal tuning machines, of either adjustable friction style, or geared (e.g. guitar) style.

At the other end of the neck is the tailblock which contains pins or brads for securing the other (loop) end of the strings. Strings are stretched between the end pins and tuners, passing over a bridge (at the tailblock end) and a nut (at the headstock), which determines the sounding length of the strings. In between the nut and the bridge lies the fingerboard, which is fitted with (typically) 12–16 metal, diatonically spaced frets; a zero fret may or may not be employed. Between the end of the fingerboard and the bridge, the neck is carved down creating a scalloped hollow that passes close to the top of the soundbox. This area, called the strum hollow, is the space in which the plectrum, fingers, or beater is employed to sound the strings (see Playing).

Both single-player and two-player instruments have been made, as have multi-neck single player units (see Variants). The vast majority of Appalachian dulcimers are single-neck, single player instruments, and these have been made with anywhere from two to a dozen strings, three being the most common number on older instruments. Modern instruments typically have 3, 4, 5, or 6 strings, arranged in either three or four courses. Many possible string arrangements exist, but the following are typical:

- 3-string: Three single-string courses.
- 4-string: Three courses, two single-strung; one double-strung. The doubled course is almost always the highest-pitched (melody) course.
- 4-string: Four single-string courses.
- 5-string: Three courses: Two double-strung; one single-strung. The single string is usually the middle course, with the bass and melody courses being double strung.
- 5-string: Four courses: One double-strung; three single-strung. The double strung course is the melody course.
- 6-string: Three double-strung courses.

=== Production ===
Appalachian dulcimers are often made by individual craftsmen and small, family-run businesses located in the American South and particularly in Appalachia. It is easy and relatively common to order custom instruments, and custom-built Appalachian dulcimers can run considerably less in cost than other custom-built stringed instruments (e.g., guitar, mandolin, or banjo).

Cheap imports from Romania, Pakistan and China are slowly making inroads into the American market. John Bailey's book, Making an Appalachian Dulcimer, is one of several still in print that provide instructions for constructing a dulcimer.

== Frets, strings, tuning and modes ==
=== Fret placement ===
The frets of the Appalachian dulcimer are typically arranged in a diatonic scale. This is in contrast with instruments like the guitar or banjo, which are fretted chromatically. As early as the mid-1950s, some makers began to include at least one additional fret, usually the so-called "six and a half", "6½" or "6+" fret a half step below the octave. This enables one to play in the Ionian mode when tuned to D3-A3-D4 (the traditional tuning for the Mixolydian mode), where the scale starts on the open (unfretted) string. This arrangement is often found to be more conducive to chord-melody play. It also became common to add a fret one octave up from the 6+ fret, called the "13+" fret, and by the late 1970s these additional frets had become standard.

Eventually, some builders began to offer further additional frets at the "1+" and "8+" positions or (as an alternative) the "4+" and "11+" positions. These additional frets facilitate the use of still more scales and modes without retuning. This trend eventually led to the availability of fully chromatic dulcimers, with twelve frets per octave, permitting playing in any key without re-tuning. The Original Chromatic Mountain Dulcimer was a Diatonic Mountain Dulcimer that has been converted by adding 5 extra frets (0+, 1+, 3+, 4+, & 6+) in all Octaves so it can play in every key for more flexibility. Chromatic fretting used to be controversial among dulcimer players, with traditionalists preferring what they feel is the greater authenticity of the diatonic fingerboard.

=== Strings ===
Appalachian dulcimers are strung with metal wire strings; wound strings may be used for the lower pitched courses. These strings are very similar to those used on banjos and guitars, and before manufacturers provided special "dulcimer sets", banjo strings were frequently used. On a typical dulcimer string, gauges range between about 0.026 in. and 0.010 in. in diameter, although gauges outside this range may be employed to facilitate special tunings or extended range playing styles.

=== Tuning ===
There is no one "standard tuning" for the Appalachian dulcimer, but as with the shape of the instrument, certain tuning arrangements have proven more popular than others. Traditionally, the Appalachian dulcimer was usually tuned (from left to right) to G3-G3-C3, C4-G3-C3, or C4-F3-C3. Note: Because the dulcimer is most often played on the lap or with the instrument lying on a table, when the instrument is held upright (headstock at the top), the highest pitched string will be on the left – this is the reverse of most other string instruments (e.g., guitar, bass, fiddle, etc.) where the lowest string is on the left. Dulcimer players, however, are accustomed to naming their strings from lowest to highest (as would a guitarist or violinist), which means that the strings are usually named reverse order from which they appear on the instrument, i.e., right to left. Thus, the tunings cited above would more commonly be given as: C3-G3-G3; C3-G3-C4; and C3-F3-C4. This convention will be followed for the rest of the article.

With the Appalachian dulcimer revival of the 1950s and 1960s, players began to favor higher-pitched tunings; this is not uncommon in the history of many stringed instruments, with players often claiming that the higher tunings make their instrument sound "brighter". In consequence, the original traditional tunings migrated up a whole step, and became: D3-A3-A3; D3-A3-D4; and D3-G3-D4, which are the most common modern tunings for three-course Appalachian dulcimers.

=== Modes ===
D3-A3-A3, is in a I V V harmonic relationship. That is, the tonic note of the diatonic major scale is on the bass string, and the middle and melody strings are at an interval of a perfect fifth above it. This tuning places the tonic (diatonic) fret on the melody string at the third fret. This facilitates playing melodies in the Ionian mode (the major scale). The melody is played on the top string (or string pair) only, with the unfretted drone strings providing a simple harmony, giving the instrument its distinctive sound.

To play in a different key, or in a different mode, a traditional player would have to retune the instrument. For example, to play a minor mode melody the instrument might be tuned to D3-A3-C4. This facilitates playing the Aeolian mode (the natural minor scale), where the scale begins at the first fret.

While the most common current tuning is D3-A3-D4, some teachers prefer the more traditional D3-A3-A3 or the so-called "Reverse Ionian" tuning, D3-G3-d4. "Reverse" tunings are ones in which the key note is on the middle string and the bass string is the fifth of the scale, but in the octave below the middle string. This is sometimes suggested by teachers as an easier tuning. From D3-G3-D4 one can put a capo on the first fret to play in the Dorian mode, or retune the second string (to A3), to play in the Mixolydian mode, then from Mixolydian, capo the first fret to play in the Aeolian mode.

== Playing ==
Appalachian dulcimer sample

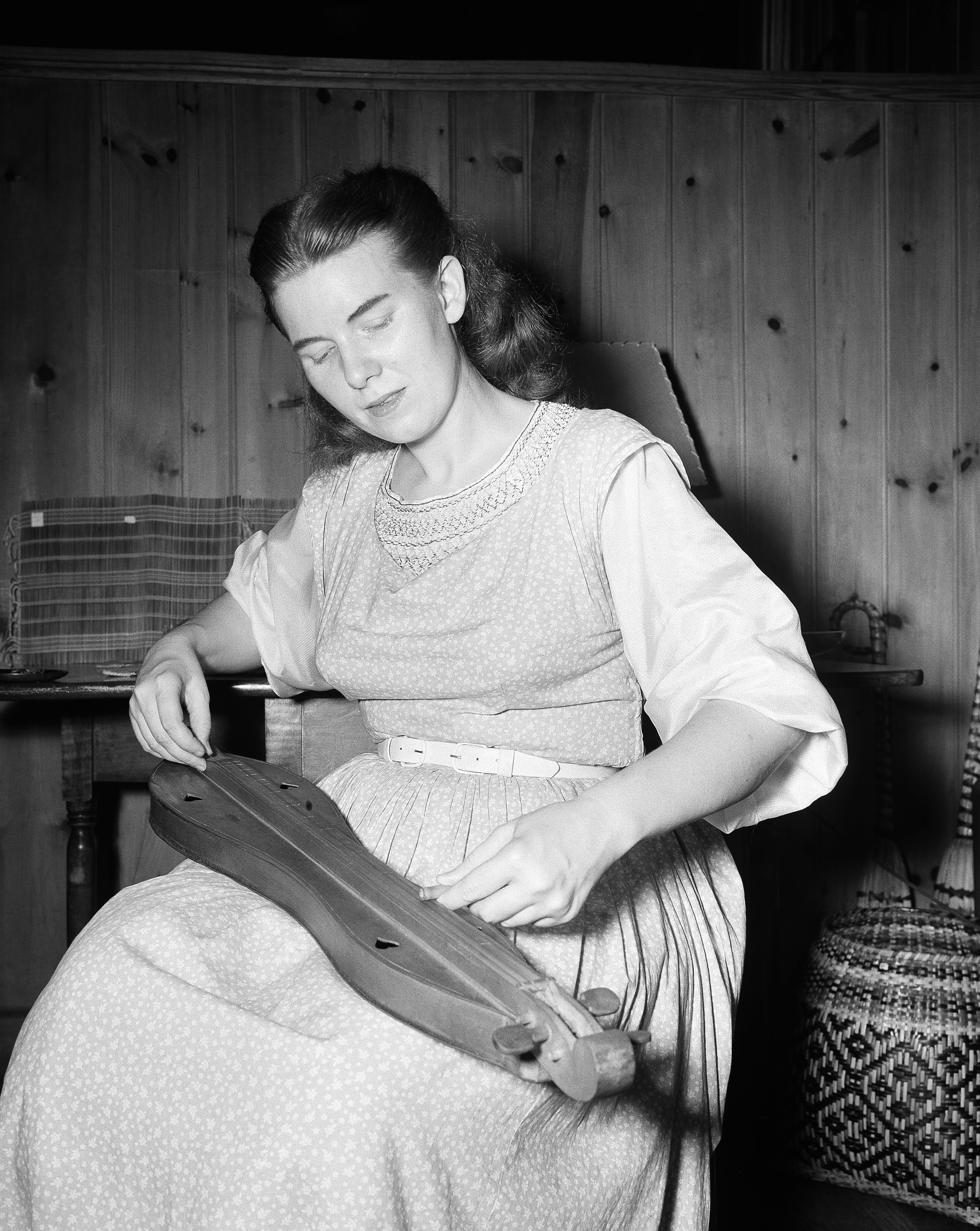
Folk singer Jean Ritchie playing an Appalachian dulcimer

With only three or four strings and a simple diatonic fret pattern, the Appalachian dulcimer is generally regarded as one of the easiest string instruments to learn. The traditional way to play the instrument is to lay it flat on the lap and pluck or strum the strings with the right hand, while fretting with the left. Alternatively, the dulcimer may also be placed on a wooden table, using the table as an extended resonator to boost volume. The instrument is generally strung with the melody string (or string pair) on the player's side of the instrument, and the bass string on the outside.

In traditional play, fretting is achieved with a "noter" – typically a short length of dowel or bamboo (see photo at left) – on the melody course, while the middle and bass strings ring as unfretted drones. This style of play is now referred to as "noter-drone" play. In some traditions, players use a feather quill with the barbs removed to strum the instrument. The frets on early mountain dulcimers were usually simple wire staples spanning only halfway across the fingerboard, meaning only the melody string course could be fretted. By the early 1960s, many dulcimer makers had abandoned staples in favour of manufactured fret wire extending across the entire width of the fingerboard. This enabled players to fret all the strings, allowing for chording and an expanded melodic range. A variety of new, "noter-less" playing styles emerged now collectively referred to as "chord-melody" play. The emergence of full-width frets also compelled makers to fret their instruments in equal temperament. The fret patterns on the older half-width-fret instruments rarely adhered to equal temperament, and intonation varied from builder to builder. With a simple melody played against the drone, these idiosyncratic scales could add warmth and a distinctive flavour to the music, but the old non-standard fret patterns often produce a dissonance when chorded that some find unacceptable.

Using modern dulcimers with full-width frets arranged for equal temperament, contemporary players have borrowed from chord theory and imported technique from other stringed instruments to greatly expand the versatility of the instrument. But a wide variety of playing styles have long been used. Instead of strumming the strings with a pick, for example, they might be strummed or picked with the fingers, or even beaten with a small stick. Jean Ritchie's The Dulcimer Book has an old photograph of Mrs. Leah Smith of Big Laurel, Kentucky, playing the dulcimer with a bow instead of a pick, with the tail of the dulcimer held in the player's lap, and the headstock resting on a table pointing away from her. In their book In Search of the Wild dulcimer, Robert Force and Al d'Ossché describe their preferred method as "guitar style": The dulcimer hangs from a strap around the neck, and the instrument is strummed like a guitar, although their fretting style is still overhand. They also describe playing "autoharp style" where "the dulcimer is held vertically with the headstock over the shoulder." Lynn McSpadden, in his book Four and Twenty Songs for the Mountain Dulcimer, states that some players "tilt the dulcimer up sideways on their laps and strum in a guitar style." Still other dulcimer players use a fingerstyle technique, fingering chord positions with the fretting hand and rhythmically plucking individual strings with the strumming hand, creating delicate arpeggios.

== Contemporary use ==
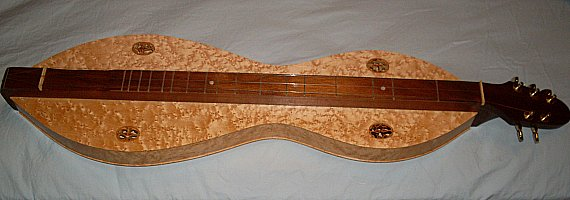

The Appalachian dulcimer is now a core instrument in the American old-time music tradition, but styles performed by modern dulcimer enthusiasts run the gamut from traditional folk music through popular and experimental forms. Some players exploit its similarity in tone to certain Middle Eastern and Asian instruments. Increasingly, modern musicians have contributed to the popularity of the solid-body electric dulcimer. Dulcimer festivals take place regularly in the United States, Canada, the United Kingdom, and Ireland, because the Appalachian dulcimer has achieved a following in a number of countries.

Though the mountain dulcimer has long been associated with the older generation, it has gradually attracted a number of younger players who have discovered its charms. Because it is easy to play, many music teachers consider it to be an especially good educational instrument. Consequently, it is often used in educational settings, and some music classes make their own dulcimers. However, due to limitations of budget, time, and craftsmanship, they are usually made from cardboard.

Brian Jones, of The Rolling Stones, played the electric Appalachian dulcimer on their 1966 album Aftermath, notably on "Lady Jane". He can be seen playing the instrument during their performance on the Ed Sullivan Show. He was influenced to use the instrument after hearing recordings of Richard Fariña. Perhaps one of the most famous players of the Appalachian dulcimer is singer-songwriter Joni Mitchell, who first played the instrument on studio recordings in the late 1960s, and most famously on the album Blue (1971), as well as in live concerts. Peter Buck of R.E.M. plays the electric Appalachian dulcimer. Paul Westerberg of The Replacements also plays an Appalachian dulcimer on their 1989 single "I'll Be You".

Cyndi Lauper is also a high-profile mountain dulcimer player, having studied with the late David Schnaufer. Lauper played dulcimer on her ninth studio album The Body Acoustic, and the tour to support the record featured her performing songs like "Time After Time" and "She Bop" solo on the mountain dulcimer. Contemporary professional musicians who view the dulcimer as their primary instrument include Stephen Seifert of Nashville and Irish blues guitarist Rory Gallagher, who used a dulcimer on his later albums. Orlando-based musician Bing Futch performs using a special dual-fretboard mountain dulcimer as well as a custom resonator and is one of only two mountain dulcimer players to have competed in the International Blues Challenge, advancing to the semifinals in the 2015 edition of the competition; during the 2016 edition, Futch made it to the finals and was awarded "Best Guitarist" in the solo-duo category, despite performing solely on the Appalachian mountain dulcimer.

Dave Cousins used both acoustic and electric dulcimers on several albums with the Strawbs.

== Variants ==
As a folk instrument, wide variation exists in Appalachian dulcimers.

- Body shapes: As previously noted, dulcimers appear in a wide variety of body types, many of which are recorded in A Catalog of Pre-Revival Dulcimers. A representative array would include: hourglass, teardrop, trapezoid, rectangular, elliptical ("Galax-style"), violin-shaped, fish-shaped, and lute-back.
- Materials: In addition to plywood, laminates, and solid woods, some builders are using experimental materials such as carbon fiber. Dulcimers are also made of cardboard. Often sold as low-cost kits, cardboard dulcimers offer surprisingly good sound and volume. Their low cost and resistance to damage make them particularly suited to institutional settings, such as elementary school classrooms.

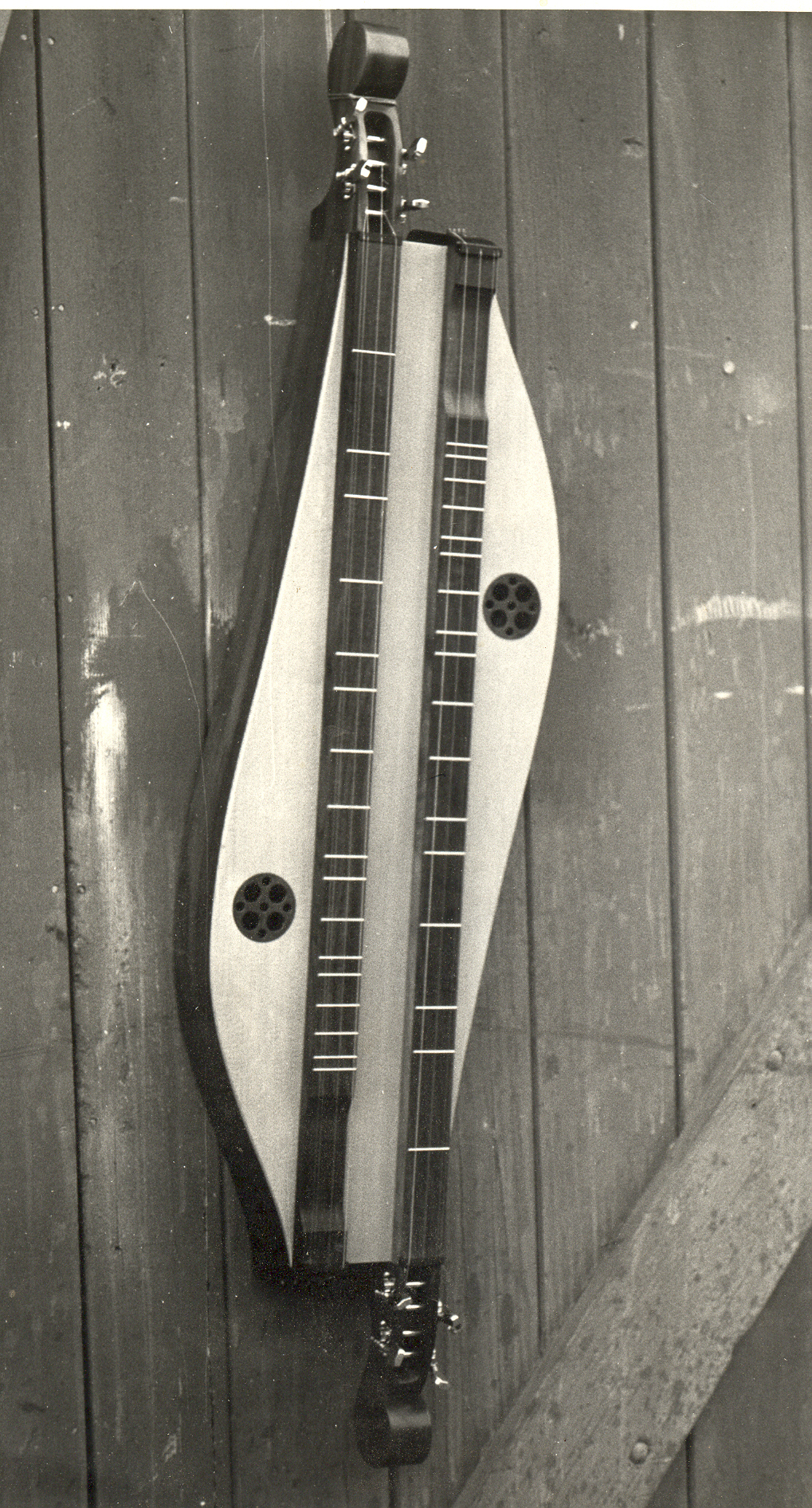
Courting dulcimer

- Number of strings: Dulcimers may have as few as two or as many as 12 strings (in up to six courses). Up to the 1960s most mountain dulcimers had three strings. The most popular variant today is four strings in three courses, with doubled melody strings.

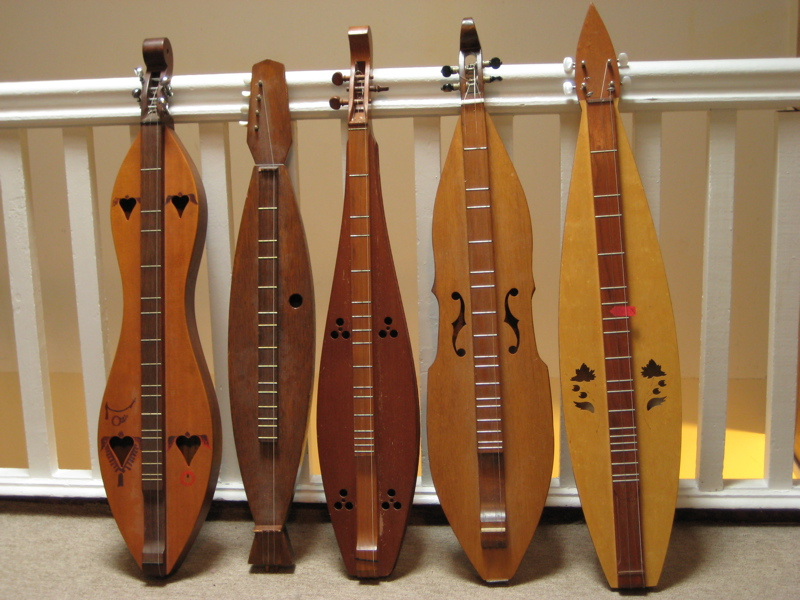
A variety of dulcimer shapes

- Sizes and range: Larger and smaller dulcimers are made, which extend the range of the instrument to higher and lower pitches, and to fill parts in dulcimer ensembles:
  - Baritone dulcimer: These are just larger versions of the regular tenor dulcimer, designed to be tuned to a lower pitch. Typically they are designed to be tuned a fourth lower: A3-E3-A2 or A3 A3-E3-A2, although any of the variant tuning patterns may be adapted to this lower pitched instrument.
  - Bass dulcimer: Very rare, these monsters may approach four feet long. They were designed for ensemble playing, and are tuned one octave lower than the baritone dulcimer: A2-E2-A1 or A2 A2-E2-A1.
  - Soprano or piccolo dulcimer: These are smaller dulcimers which range in size from about 80% all the way down to about 50% of the regular tenor dulcimer in length. They are designed to support higher pitches, and tuning is typically a fourth higher: G4-D4-G3 or G4 G4-D4-G3. The smaller size and reduced scale-length also facilitates playing by persons with smaller hands, such as children.
  - Alto Dulcimer: This is similar to the soprano dulcimer but larger and better suited in has a lower pitch
  - Other sizes have been experimented with, including contrabass dulcimers.
- Courting dulcimers: One unusual variant is the "courting dulcimer." This instrument consists of one large dulcimer body with two separate fingerboards. The instrument is laid across the laps of two facing individuals (the eponymous "courting" pair) and used to play duets.
- Double-neck dulcimers: Somewhat the same as a "courting dulcimer", but with both fretboards (or "necks") facing the same direction. It allows for multiple tunings without changing instruments.
- Solid-body electric dulcimer: acoustic dulcimers may be electrified with pickups, and several builders produce solid-body electric dulcimers.
- Aquavina: a dulcimer employing a metal resonator filled partially with water. The resonator is agitated while playing, producing an eerie oscillation of the harmonics.

=== Hybrid instruments ===
- Bowed dulcimers: Dulcimers that can be played with bows; in the modern era heavily modified variants have been made exclusively for bowed playing.
- Guitar dulcimer: a hybrid of guitar and dulcimer, with the body more closely resembling a guitar, but the string configuration and pegs of a dulcimer. The stringing pattern on these instruments are frequently the reverse of the dulcimer, with low-pitched strings on the left and higher strings on the right, and they are usually held and played like a guitar, in guitar position. This variant was first explored, and later patented, by Homer Ledford, and called the "dulcitar." (see below)
- Dulcitar (also stick dulcimer or strum-stick): a long-necked fretted instrument, similar to a guitar or mandolin, with diatonic dulcimer fretting. It differs from the guitar dulcimer chiefly in having a much narrower and shallower body, closer to the proportions of the soundbox of the Appalachian dulcimer. These instruments are known by a wide variety of names, with the most common commercial model being the McNally Strumstick.
- Banjo dulcimer: resembles a standard dulcimer, but with a banjo-head on the body. This variant was first explored, and later patented, by Homer Ledford, and called the "dulcijo." Similar instruments include the "Ban-Jammer" (Mike Clemmer), the "Banjimer" (Keith Young) and the "Banj-Mo" (Folk Notes). The "Dulci-Jo" is a banjo/dulcimer hybrid with a thumb string like a clawhammer banjo, 3 strings and a diatonic fret pattern, shaped more like a banjo and played upright, and built by Michael Fox of NC.
- Resonator dulcimer: a standard dulcimer, with a resonator added to the body, in imitation of the resonator guitar. This variant was first explored, and later patented, by Homer Ledford and called the "dulcibro".

== See also ==
- Hearts of the Dulcimer
- List of Appalachian dulcimer players
