= Object:Paradise =

Performance and poetics collective

- Object:Paradise, z.s.
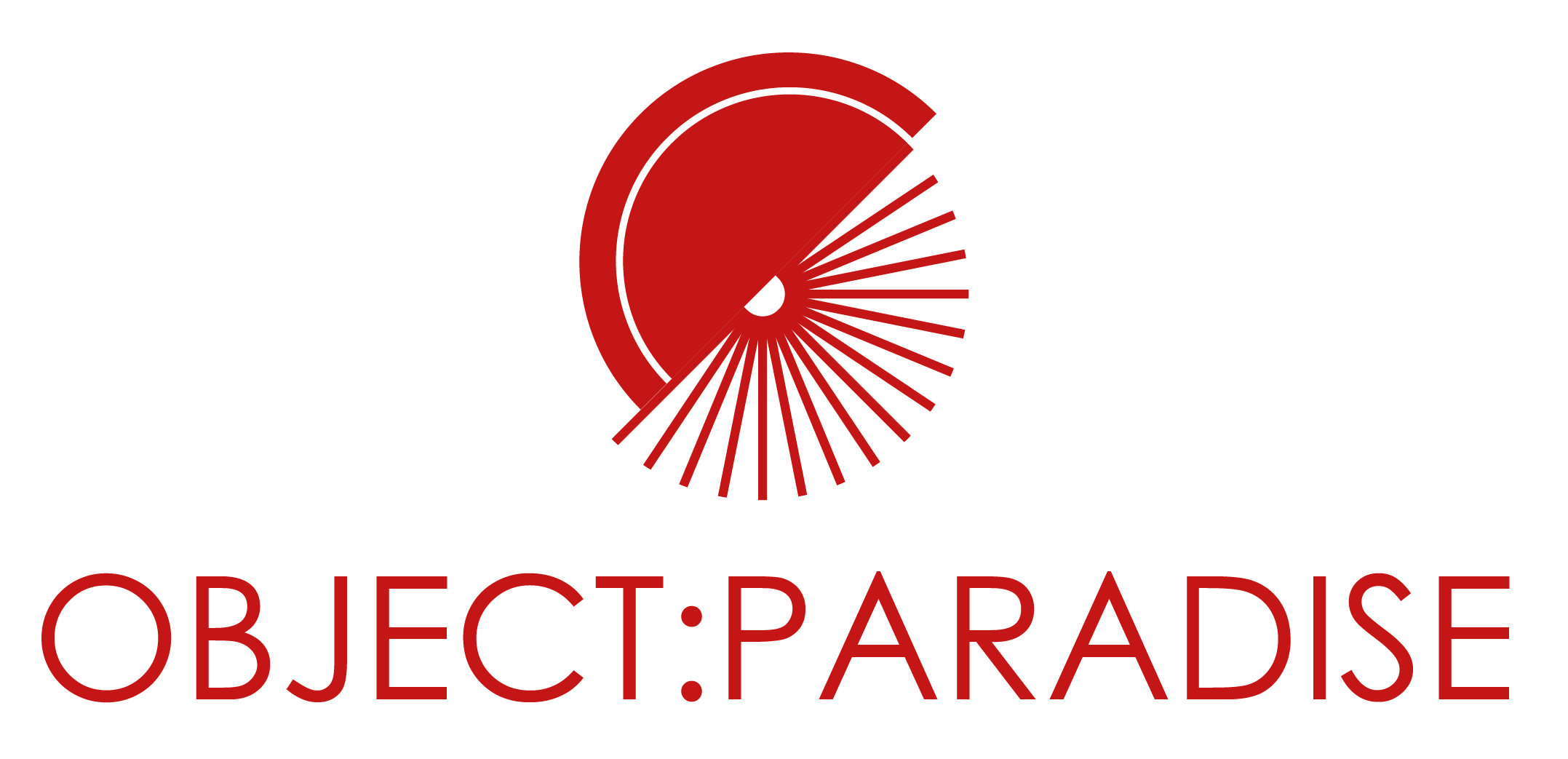

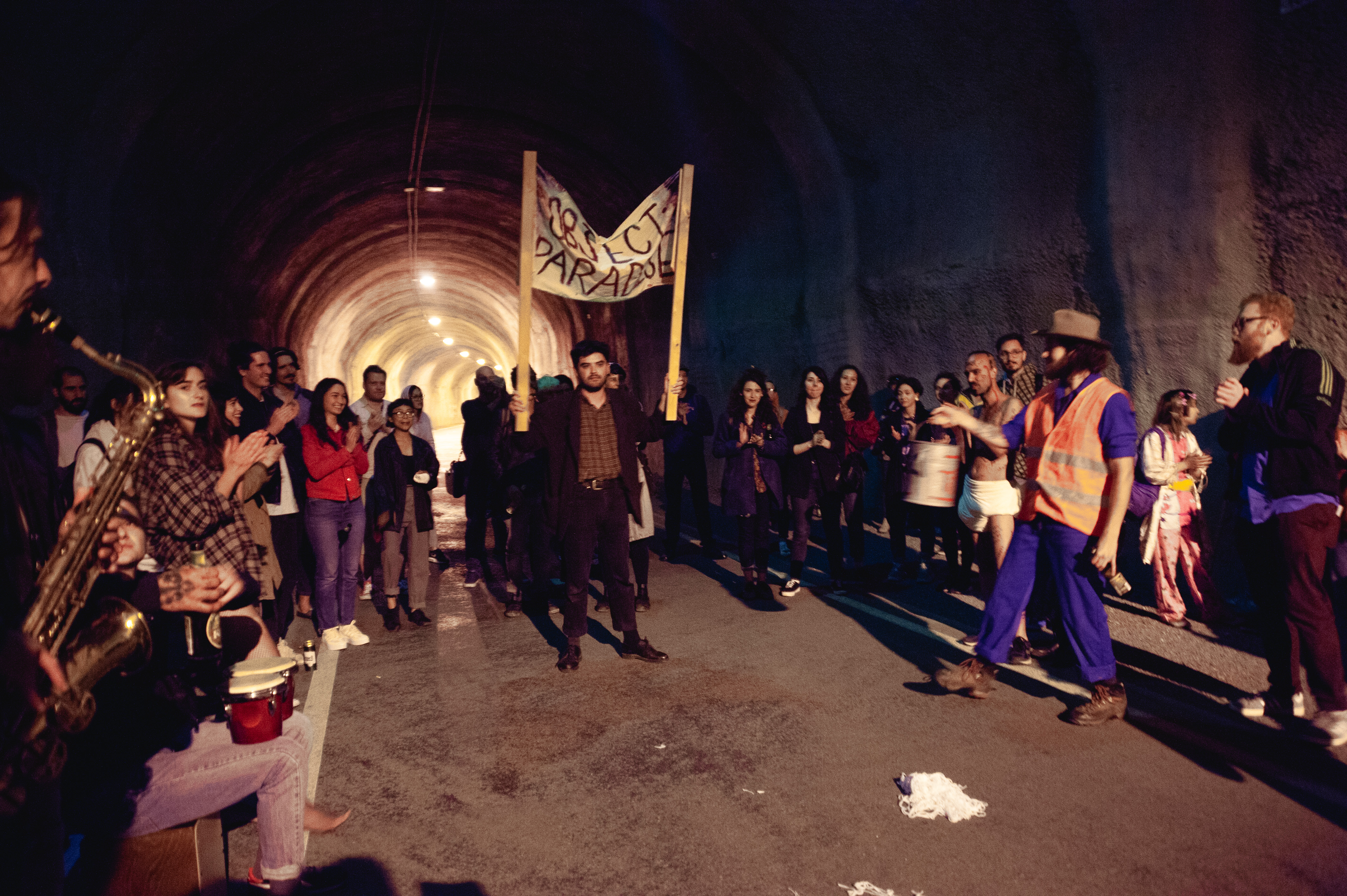
- Formation: November 2018
- Founders: Tyko Say, Jeff Milton
- Founded at: Prague, Czech Republic
- Type: Artist Collective, Non-governmental Organization
- Registration no.: 09829911
- Professional title: Performance and poetics collective revolving around the pragmatics of language.
- Headquarters: Prague, Czech Republic
- Board of directors: Tyko Say, Sandra Pasławska, Jaromír Lelek
- Website: www.objectparadise.com

Object:Paradise (stylized as OBJECT:PARADISE) is a performance and poetics collective based in Prague, Czech Republic, formed by writers Tyko Say and Jeff Milton in 2018. The non-profit collective produces anti-poetry happenings, installations, and other multi-media works regarding their manifesto which calls to make poetry readings more dynamic, interdisciplinary, and contextually-dependent, in the name of a language happening.

== History ==
Object:Paradise was formed in 2018 with the meeting of Tyko Say and Jeff Milton in the Ouky Douky cafe in Prague's Holešovice neighborhood where the two scheduled their first performance to involve characteristics of beat poetry, bebop jazz, and elements of theater, involving a cast composed majority of expats where English would be used as the lingua franca. This event would later be recognized as the first step of the collective's push to create a space where the poetry reading is promoted as a pragmatic performance rather than a literary event, prioritizing shared language and experience between audience and performer.

On 13 November 2019, Say and Milton self-released the collective's first album Object:Paradise Volume 1 at their event Channels of Communication where compiled VHS video from the Los Angeles collective Everything Is Terrible! was projected which would later be a common aesthetic and convention of their curations. Later on 20 January 2020, a documentary of the event under the same name was released, signifying the first video production of their events and manifesto in the works.

In July 2020, the collective began their transition from hosting events in private spaces to public spaces, specifically at their event Tunnel Vision(s) which was held in the Starý Vítkovský tunel where three stages were erected and the performed language could be interpreted separately depending on the audience's position within the tunnel. The cast of the event was composed primarily of the expat community of Prague and featured various acts such as body grooming, interpretative dance, protest, installation, and readings. The event would later be a critical happening in the writing of the collective's manifesto which would not only prioritize an interdisciplinary approach to poetics, but also highlight the importance of the space in which it occurs.

In 2020, the collective's second film, Object:Praha, was released. Premiering at Prague Microfestival and later screened at the Versopolis Festival of Hope, the film documented scenes of Tunnel Vision(s) as well as other happenings in Prague from 2019 to 2020.

In April and May 2021, the collective had its first curated language installation, titled Now Showing with the New York-based Flow chart foundation where a curation of texts were projected from a high rise balcony before the Žižkov Television Tower in Prague. The installation featured texts from eight writers: Tyko Say, Marc Fischer, Michael Ashkin, Jason Geistweidt, David Levi Strauss, Kay Rosen, Max Goldfarb, and Norman Douglas. The objective of the projection, which occurred during the COVID-19 pandemic, was to "bring poetry back to an accessible space: on the way to the store". Tyko Say's piece titled We was in turn projected in Hudson, New York in March of the same year.

In February 2022 the collective released their second album, OBJECT:PARADISE Volume II, on Seattle-based record label Sifter Grim, featuring over 20-Prague based artists and focusing primarily on topics concerning Prague's Žižkov neighborhood. The composition was released alongside a documentary, Object:Praha II, on the filming of the project.

In August 2023 the collective's first international language happening was co-curated by Visegrád collectives ARS LATRANS, Poland; Slam Poetry SK, Slovakia; and ArtPortal, Hungary. The curation featured over fifty performances across Poland and Czech Republic in three events—one of them occurring on a train between Prague to Kraków. The event was funded by the Visegrad Fund, and was documented in Object:paradise's fourth film OBJECT:PRAHA : IV : Performance, Deformance, Reformance which would later be screened in the four countries.

In 2025 the collective ran Momentument, a project of three events built around shared creation, shared curation and shared exhibition. Participants made works together on large canvases, framed parts of them, cut the excess canvas away, and exhibited the found works. The collective credited the moment itself as the author of the works.

In August 2026 the collective was described as "one of the more intriguing inheritors of the city’s long Dadaist & post-Dadaist tradition," in Prague Dada: Cook your Grandpas, an anthology of Prague Dada edited by David Vichnar and published by Litteraria Pragensia.

== Manifesto ==
The collective's guiding text, the OBJECT:PARADISE Manifesto, was written in 2020, the year of Tunnel Vision(s), in Prague's Žižkov district and is credited to four of the collective's then-members: Tyko Say, Sandra Pasławska, Jaromír Lelek and Roksan Mandel. It consists of a preamble, four numbered sections and twenty "mantras", and is published under a Creative Commons Attribution 4.0 license. The text proposes the "language happening" as an alternative to the conventional poetry reading. It argues that poetry is a product fixed after the poetic moment has passed, and that meaning depends on the context in which a text is received.

In a 2024 interview with the literary magazine Host (H7O), Say said the manifesto is what unites the collective. In a 2025 interview with A2, he described removing any claims about what counts as poetry, art or a title as "an essential part of our manifesto". A 2022 Radio Prague International report noted that the manifesto states the group aims to keep chaos under control.

== Archive ==
In June 2026 the collective stated that its YouTube channel, which held video and metadata documenting its events since 2018, had been permanently deleted and that it had been barred from creating another. It responded by building the OBJECT:PARADISE Archive, a website it describes as independent of commercial platforms. The site hosts the collective's films, the zine KROTCH, sound recordings and event documentation, a video player (O:P:TV), and a directory and network map of contributing poets and events. Submissions accepted by the archive are also deposited with the Internet Archive.

== Releases ==
=== Sound ===
- Object:Paradise Volume I (2019)
- Object:Paradise Volume II (2022)

=== Film ===
- Channels of Communication (2019)
- Object:Praha I (2020)
- Object:Praha II (2022)
- Object:Praha III : The Manifesto (2022)
- Object:Praha IV : Performance, Deformance, Reformance (2023)
- Existence is Resistance (2024)
- Object:Praha V : Momentument (2025)

=== Print ===
- KROTCH (on-going)

Since June 2022, the collective has published a monthly zine titled KROTCH which features anonymous works from their collective and wider community. The objective of the magazine is to promote an anonymous poetics that can be looked at instead of being read. The publication features poetry, satirical reportage, missed connections, and collages. The print-only magazine is distributed in a samizdat method to prioritize community circulation.

- Existence is Resistance (2024)

In June 2024, collective members Tyko Say and Sandra Pasławska, along with critical theorist Louis Armand and author David Vichnar, traveled to Lviv, Ukraine to work on a collaborative project to document the role of culture in war and the effect of war on culture. What resulted was full-length documentary book and film titled Existence is Resistance which was premiered later in October 2024 at the Prague Microfestival.
