= James Hardiman Library =

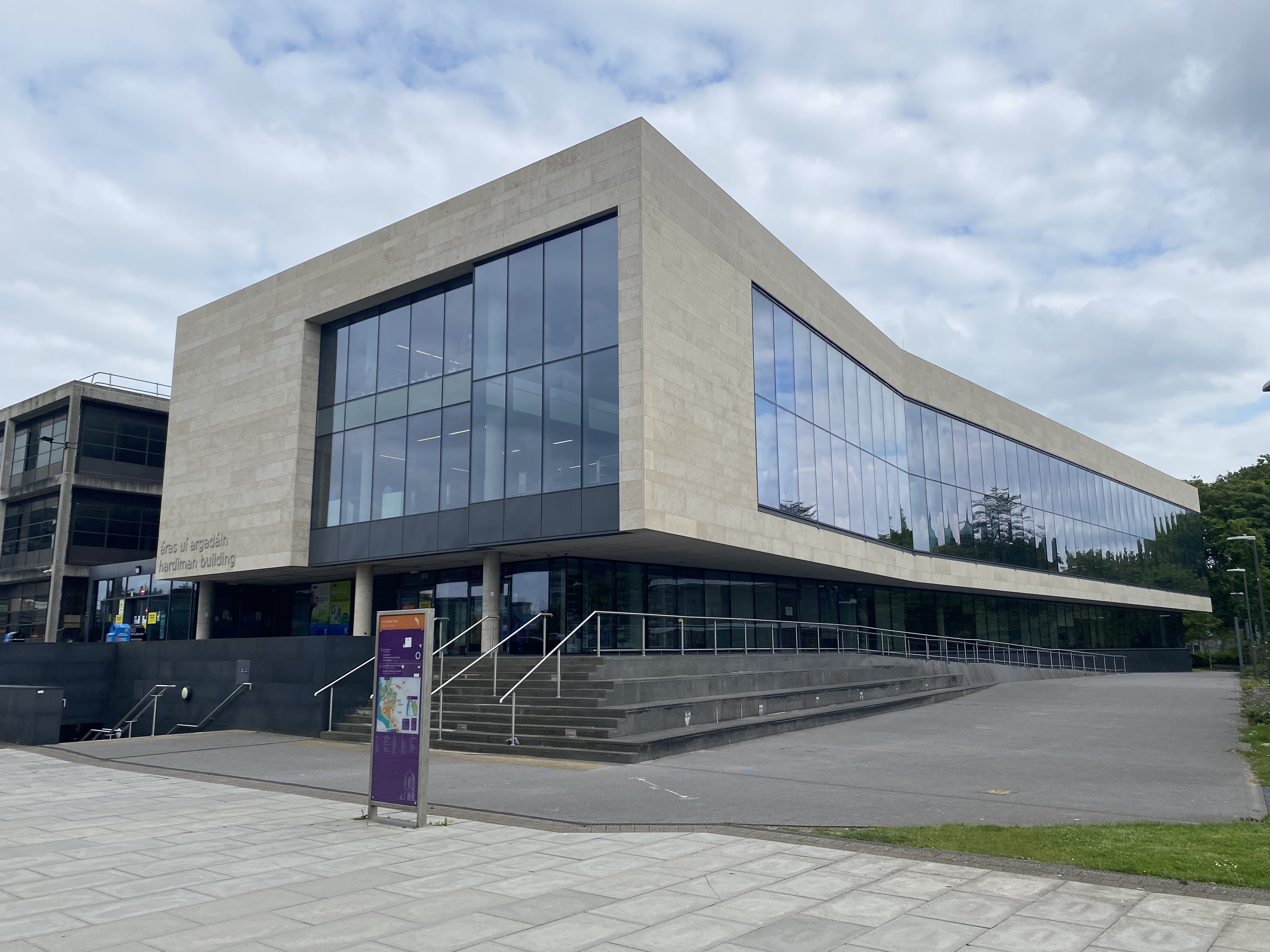
- James Hardiman Library after 2013 extension
- 53.27990312311858°N 9.061068659218874°W
- Location: University of Galway, Ireland
- Type: Academic library

Access and use
- Access requirements: Registered students and all staff of the University are entitled to use the Library. Graduates of the University of Galway, students from other Universities and members of the public requiring access for genuine research purposes or scholarly needs may apply to use the James Hardiman Library.

Other information
- Website: https://library.universityofgalway.ie

The James Hardiman Library (Irish: Leabharlann Shéamais Uí Argadáin) serves the University of Galway in Ireland. It is a legal deposit or "copyright library", which means that publishers in the country must deposit a copy of all their publications there, free of charge. The James Hardiman Library is home to an extensive range of cultural artefacts, particularly relating to the history of theatre. This includes the largest digital theatre archive in the world, a joint project with The Abbey, Ireland's national theatre, to preserve material that institution has compiled since its foundation. Other theatre archives found at the James Hardiman Library include those of the Gate Theatre, An Taibhdhearc (the national Irish language theatre), the Lyric Theatre and the Druid Theatre Company (Ireland's first professional theatre company established outside Dublin). In addition, manuscripts collected by Douglas Hyde, the first President of Ireland, are deposited at the James Hardiman Library, as is a manuscript personally donated by James Joyce in 1932.

"Access to Research at NUI Galway" (ARAN) is the university's repository of research publications, including peer-reviewed articles, working papers and conference papers by the university's researchers, and is maintained by the James Hardiman Library.

== Location ==
The James Hardiman Library is situated centrally, close to the Concourse, the Arts Millennium Building and Áras na Gaeilge.

== History ==
The Library is named in honour of James Hardiman, who was the university's first librarian.

== Legal deposit library status ==
According to the Ireland's Copyright and Related Rights Act, 2000, the James Hardiman Library is entitled, along with the National Library of Ireland, the British Library and Trinity College Library, as well as libraries at UCC, UCD, MU, UL, and DCU, to receive a copy of all works published in the Republic of Ireland. Section 198(1) of the Act states "the publisher of any book published in the state, shall, within one month after publication, deliver, at his or her own expense, a copy of the book to each of the following…", then lists the libraries concerned.

== Archives ==
The James Hardiman Library houses more than three hundred archival collections which range from the fifteenth century onwards. Numerous archives relating to literature, theatre and other items of cultural merit to be found there include the following:

=== History ===
- A collection of books about the Williamite Wars (1689-91) in Ireland and its aftermath, donated by the son of a graduate of the University

=== Literature ===
- Douglas Hyde's manuscript collections of poetry and folklore he gathered
- An original edition of Pomes Penyeach, personally donated by James Joyce in 1932 after its publication in Paris, and printed on rare Japanese paper complete with illustrations by the writer's daughter Lucia.
- The John McGahern Archive (John McGahern)
- The Thomas Kilroy Collection (Thomas Kilroy): Available from August 2011, this archive includes Kilroy's academic criticism, papers relating to his board membership of The Field Day Theatre Company and his collaboration with The Abbey Theatre, as well as notes, drafts, scripts, and production material relating to all of Kilroy's plays. Correspondence featured includes from the Seamuses: Deane and Heaney; Mary Lavin, John McGahern, various agents, publishers, theatre practitioners and the general public. On 22 March 2011, a public interview with Kilroy, moderated by Professor Adrian Frazier (with an introduction by Doctor Lionel Pilkington), was held at the University of Galway to mark the donation; amongst those in attendance were Brian Friel and Michael D. Higgins.
- Máirtín Ó Direáin
- The literary papers of Eoghan Ó Tuairisc

=== Theatre ===
- The Taibhdhearc na Gaillimhe Archive (Taibhdhearc na Gaillimhe)
- The Druid Theatre Archive (Druid Theatre Company)
- The Lyric Theatre, Belfast Archive
- The Siobhán McKenna Archive (Siobhán McKenna)
- The Arthur Shields Archive (Arthur Shields)
- In 2012, the Abbey Theatre and NUI Galway formed a partnership to digitise the Abbey Theatre archive, billed as the largest digital theatre archive in the world.
- In 2016, digitisation of the Gate Theatre archives commenced.
- The John Arden and Margaretta D'Arcy Archive (John Arden and Margaretta D'Arcy) launched on 24 November 2017.

=== Screen ===
- The John Huston Archive (John Huston)

=== Other ===
- The Galway Arts Festival Archive (Galway Arts Festival)
- The Brendan Duddy Archive (Brendan Duddy), papers deposited in 2009, unveiled at a symposium in November 2011 attended by Michael Oatley and Seán Ó hUigínn
- In 2014 the Kevin Boyle (lawyer) archive was added for the study of human rights.

== Constituent buildings ==
According to an internal newsletter from February 2009, the James Hardiman Library at that time spanned four floors and housed 424,843 books and 1,645 study spaces.

The new Nursing & Midwifery Library opened in June 2009. It spans three floors and can be accessed via the James Hardiman Library. The university's Nursing Library had previously been located in Dangan.

== See also ==
- List of libraries in the Republic of Ireland
