= Roy Heath =

Guyanese writer (1926–2008)

Roy A. K. Heath
- Born: Roy Aubrey Kelvin Heath; 13 August 1926; Georgetown, British Guiana
- Died: 14 May 2008 (aged 81); London, England
- Education: University of London (B.A. Hons); Lincoln's Inn
- Occupations: Novelist, teacher
- Children: 2 sons (inc. Rohan Heath), 1 daughter
- Writing career
- Notable works: The Murderer (1978); "The Georgetown Trilogy": From the Heat of the Day (1979), One Generation (1980), Genetha (1981)
- Notable awards: Guardian Fiction Prize; Guyana Prize for Literature

Roy Aubrey Kelvin Heath (13 August 1926 – 14 May 2008) was a Guyanese writer who settled in the UK, where he lived for five decades, working as a schoolteacher as well as writing. His 1978 novel The Murderer won the Guardian Fiction Prize. He went on to become more noted for his "Georgetown Trilogy" of novels, consisting of From the Heat of the Day (1979), One Generation (1980), and Genetha (1981), which were also published in an omnibus volume as The Armstrong Trilogy, 1994. Heath said that his writing was "intended to be a dramatic chronicle of twentieth-century Guyana".

== Biography ==
Roy Heath was born and grew up in Georgetown in what was then British Guiana, and "had African, Indian, European and Amerindian blood running through his veins". He was the second son and youngest of the four children of Melrose Arthur Heath (d. 1928), head teacher of a primary school, and his wife, Jessie de Weever (d. 1991), music teacher. Educated at Central High School, Georgetown, Heath worked as a Treasury clerk (1944–51) before leaving for the UK in 1951.

He attended the University of London (1952–56), earning a B.A. Honours degree in Modern Languages. He also studied law and was called to the bar at Lincoln's Inn in 1964 (and to the Guyana bar in 1973), although he never practised as a lawyer, pursuing a career since 1959 as a writer and a schoolteacher in London, where he lived until his death at the age of 81. In his later years he had suffered from Parkinson's disease.

Musician and songwriter Rohan Heath, founder of the band Urban Cookie Collective, is his son.

== Writing ==
Although Heath left British Guiana in 1951, "it never left him. He only ever wrote about his mother's land, never his adopted home." As Mark McWatt notes: "Guyana is always the setting for his fiction, and its capital and rural villages are evoked in the kind of powerful and minute detail that would seem to require the author's frequent visits." However, "Although [Heath's] fiction has fed richly upon his obsessive and meticulous memories of Georgetown and the coastland, his novels cannot be called celebrations of the place and its people. They seem to reveal instead the failures and shameful inadequacies of individual and community."

His short story "Miss Mabel's Burial" was published in 1972 in the Guyanese journal Kaie; another story, "The Wind and the Sun", appeared in the Jamaican journal Savacou two years later.

Heath's first novel, A Man Come Home, was published in 1974 by Longman, where Anne Walmsley was Caribbean publisher, with a limited focus on the local educational market. When Heath completed his next book, Walmsley "urged him to look elsewhere for a firm that could bring his work the acclaim, the wide sales, that it deserved. Who better than the then fledgling Allison and Busby?" Taken on by A&B, with Margaret Busby as editor, Heath's next novel, published in 1978, was The Murderer, which that same year won the Guardian Fiction Prize and was described by The Observer as "mysteriously authentic, and unique as a work of art". The Murderer was also listed in 1999's The Modern Library: 200 Best Novels in English since 1950 by Carmen Callil and Colm Tóibín.

Heath's next three novels were From the Heat of the Day (1979), One Generation (1980) and Genetha (1981), eventually published in a single volume under the title The Armstrong Trilogy. His other published novels are Kwaku; or, The Man Who Could Not Keep His Mouth Shut (1982), Orealla (1984), The Shadow Bride (1988) and The Ministry of Hope (1997). His novels "capture the anxieties of modernity in the face of crippling economic forces and explore the burdens of the past defined by slavery, indentured labor, and Amerindian disenfranchisement."

He also wrote non-fiction, including Shadows Round the Moon: Caribbean Memoirs (1990), and plays – his Inez Combray was produced in Georgetown, Guyana, in 1972, in which year he won the Guyana Theatre Guild Award.

In 1983, during a vacation to Guyana, Heath delivered the Edgar Mittelholzer Memorial Lecture, entitled "Art and Experience", in Georgetown. In the lecture Heath stated: "The price the artist pays for his egotism is a high one. On one level egotism obliges him to create, while the same egotism threatens to destroy him. Success not only goes to his head, it remains there, creating demands he cannot hope to satisfy. I am acutely aware of all of this and therefore try to shun gratuitous publicity."

In 1989 he was awarded the Guyana Prize for Literature for his novel The Shadow Bride, which was also shortlisted for the 1991 Booker Prize, and about which Publishers Weekly said: "Heath's modest, unpretentious style undergirds a powerful realism as his subtle analysis of family conflicts builds to a tragic and moving climax."

== Reception ==
Heath's writings have been widely acclaimed and he has been called "truly one of the most brilliant story tellers ever", with reviewers at different times comparing his work to that of such great writers as D. H. Lawrence, R. K. Narayan, Dostoevsky, Tolstoy, Graham Greene, Joseph Conrad, V. S. Naipaul and others. Described by Salman Rushdie as "a beautiful writer" and by Edward Blishen as "simply one of the most astonishingly good novelists of our time", Heath might have been better known outside literary circles had he not eschewed personal publicity, believing that his work should speak for itself.

In 2017, Aftermath of Empire: The Novels of Roy A. K. Heath, a comprehensive critique of his oeuvre, was published by Ameena Gafoor.

=== The Murderer (1978) ===
Winner of the Guardian Fiction Prize in 1978, The Murderer was well reviewed on first publication and later reissues, being described by The Observer as "mysteriously authentic, and unique as a work of art" and by Publishers Weekly as "an impressive study of a man's descent into paranoia and madness." Wilson Harris in World Literature Written in English said: "What is impressive about The Murderer is the execution of a style that truncates emotion."

In May 2022, The Murderer was reissued in the UK as a Penguin Classic, and also was reprinted in the United States by McNally Editions. Other praise for the novel has been given by Lemn Sissay ("Guyanese authors are a radiant constellation, and Roy Heath stands rightfully among them. His unique style stands out from others of his time, and ours"), Salman Rushdie ("A beautiful writer and an unforgettable book"), and Colm Tóibín ("A masterpiece").

=== The Armstrong Trilogy – From the Heat of the Day (1979), One Generation (1980), Genetha (1981) ===
"A spare, bleak saga of two generations in the life of a Guyanese family struggling for respectability but unable to snatch any but the most fleeting moments of happiness. ... Like the early D.H. Lawrence, Heath endows the familiar trials of this family with an elemental power, as if each were happening for the first time. The result is harrowing in its simplicity and cumulative force." (Kirkus Reviews)

"Mr. Heath is a gentle social satirist with a concise, probing style; his prose is filled with ironies, both overt and subtle.... Roy Heath's solid devotion to character, plot and emotion, to the minutiae of daily life and its buried tragedies, is not post-modern or even modernist. It is impossible, despite his work's affinities to Dostoyevsky and Hardy and the Joyce of 'Dubliners,' to put a date on it: the post-colonial world has its own unique time lines. To call this author old-fashioned, however, is nothing but praise." (The New York Times)

=== Kwaku; or, the Man Who Could Not Keep His Mouth Shut (1982) ===
"Heath is a master of droll, understated comedy; his affectionate empathy with his characters is never for a moment compromised by condescension. He's a somewhat flintier R.K. Narayan, and there's more than whiff of Kipling in his avuncular fascination with scramblers and hustlers. A wonderful novel, which stands impressively both on its own and in tandem with its equally irresistible sequel. There's no longer any doubt that Heath is one of the world's best writers." (Kirkus Reviews)

"Kwaku comes from a long line of literary buffoons who manage to triumph over the intelligent people around them. The language Mr. Heath employs to describe this process is luxurious and densely baroque in places, sweetly comic in others. The hero's clowning conceals an essential wisdom and goodness. In the end, he is unable to become as hardened and corrupt as the people he tries so desperately to emulate, and in this lies his greatest success." (Mark Childress, The New York Times)

=== Orealla (1984) ===
"...this novel perhaps owes as much to Wilson Harris as to Mittelholzer, contrasting as it does the communal, spiritual and moral values of traditional Amerindian life" (Stewart Brown, Kyk-over-Al)

"Heath's novels are so imbued with local sights, sounds, smells, speech and unique features of the landscape that they offer rare and penetrating insight into the history and culture of twentieth century Guyana." (Frank Birbalsingh, Indo-Caribbean World)

=== The Shadow Bride (1988) ===
"The Guyanese-born Heath ... surpasses himself with this ambitious, vividly written, psychologically rich chronicle—set in his own colorfully multiracial native country—of compromised ambition and family conflict. ... Heath's brilliant novel—also distinguished for its flexible and lyrical prose, expert handling of its several native populations, varieties of pidgin English, and memorable use of figurative language—was shortlisted for the Booker Prize. It's hard to believe it didn't win." (Kirkus Reviews)

"Heath's modest, unpretentious style undergirds a powerful realism as his subtle analysis of family conflicts builds to a tragic and moving climax." (Publishers Weekly)

=== The Ministry of Hope (1997) ===
"A wonderful comic novel.... A dramatic display of character in action that has seldom been matched by any contemporary novelist. On all counts, a triumph." (Kirkus Reviews)

"With a fine ear for comic dialogue and an eye for the ironies of clashing personalities ... Heath ably steers his charming ship of fools and knaves through a sea of picaresque corruption to a generous-hearted conclusion." (Publishers Weekly)

=== Shadows Round the Moon (1990) ===
"In his memoir-novel Shadows Round the Moon Heath offers reminiscences of colonial life and Caribbean culture. His reproductions of Guyanese dialect, as well as his descriptions of the Creole (black), Hindu, and Muslim communities are noteworthy." (Raymond Williams)

== Bibliography ==
Novels

- A Man Come Home (London: Longman, 1974).
- The Murderer (London: Allison & Busby, 1978, winner of Guardian Fiction Prize; reissued 2022 by Penguin Books).
- From the Heat of the Day (London: Allison & Busby, 1979).
- One Generation (London: Allison & Busby, 1980).
- Genetha (London: Allison & Busby, 1981).
- Kwaku; or, the Man Who Could Not Keep His Mouth Shut (London: Allison & Busby, 1982).
- Orealla (London: Allison & Busby, 1984).
- The Shadow Bride (London: Collins, 1988; New York: Persea Books, 1995).
- The Armstrong Trilogy (New York: Persea, 1994).
- The Ministry of Hope (London: Marion Boyars, 1997).

Memoir

- Shadows Round the Moon: Caribbean Memoirs (London: Collins, 1990).

Short stories

- "Miss Mabel's Burial", in Kaie (Georgetown, Guyana), 1972.
- "The Wind and the Sun", in Savacou (Kingston, Jamaica), 1974.
- "The Writer of Anonymous Letters", in Firebird 2, edited by T. J. Binding (London: Penguin Books, 1983).
- "Sisters," in The London Magazine, September 1988.
- "The Master Tailor and the Lady's Skirt", in Colours of a New Day: Writing for South Africa, edited by Sarah LeFanu and Stephen Hayward (London: Lawrence & Wishart, 1990)
- "According to Marx", in So Very English, edited by Marsha Rowe (London: Serpent's Tail, 1991).

Lecture

- Art and Experience – Eighth series, Edgar Mittelholzer Memorial Lectures (Georgetown, Guyana, Department of Culture, Ministry of Education, Social Development and Culture, 1983; 31 pp.).

== Awards ==
- 1972: Guyana Theatre Guild Award
- 1978: Guardian Fiction Prize for The Murderer
- 1989: Guyana Prize for Literature
- 1991: Booker Prize shortlist for The Shadow Bride
