= The Murderer (novel) =

1978 novel by Guyanese writer Roy Heath

- First edition paperback (UK)
- Author: Roy Heath
- Language: English
- Published: 1978
- Publisher: Allison and Busby (UK); Persea (US)
- Publication place: UK
- Awards: The Guardian Fiction Prize
- Preceded by: A Man Come Home
- Followed by: From the Heat of the Day

The Murderer is a 1978 novel by Guyanese writer Roy A. K. Heath. The author's second novel, it was first published in London by Allison and Busby, with Margaret Busby as editor, and was the winner of the Guardian Fiction Prize.

== Reception ==
The Murderer was well reviewed on first publication and in its later reissues, being described by The Observer as "mysteriously authentic, and unique as a work of art" and by Publishers Weekly as "an impressive study of a man's descent into paranoia and madness".

Wilson Harris, reviewing the novel in World Literature Written in English, wrote: "What is impressive about The Murderer is the execution of a style that truncates emotion...."

In 2008, David Katz appraised Roy Heath's writing career in Caribbean Beat, noting: "His 1978 book The Murderer, which won the Guardian Fiction prize, was a haunting account of the paranoid protagonist’s descent into madness and the inevitable outcome that gives the book its title; this, and the compelling Armstrong Family trilogy that followed (From the Heat of the Day (1979), One Generation (1980) and Genetha (1981)), helped establish his reputation, drawing comparisons to Joseph Conrad, Tolstoy and Dostoevsky."

The Murderer was listed in 1999's The Modern Library: 200 Best Novels in English since 1950 by Carmen Callil and Colm Tóibín.

On the novel's 2022 re-issue, Colin Grant described it in The New York Review of Books as "a literary thriller that sheds light on the societal divisions and the undercurrent of political violence that beset Guyana in the 1950s and continued beyond independence in 1966. ...The Murderer is a strange, luminous, and beguiling work by a writer with a mysterious and captivating Caribbean voice."

Heath's son Rohan has recalled that his father wrote The Murderer in six weeks.

== Editions ==
- 1978: London: Allison and Busby
- 1984: Fontana Paperbacks
- 1986: New York: Persea Books
- 2022: Penguin Books (Penguin Modern Classics), ISBN 9780241552728. US: McNally Editions, ISBN 9781946022295 (distributed by Simon & Schuster).
