= Stephen Rea =

Irish actor (born 1946)

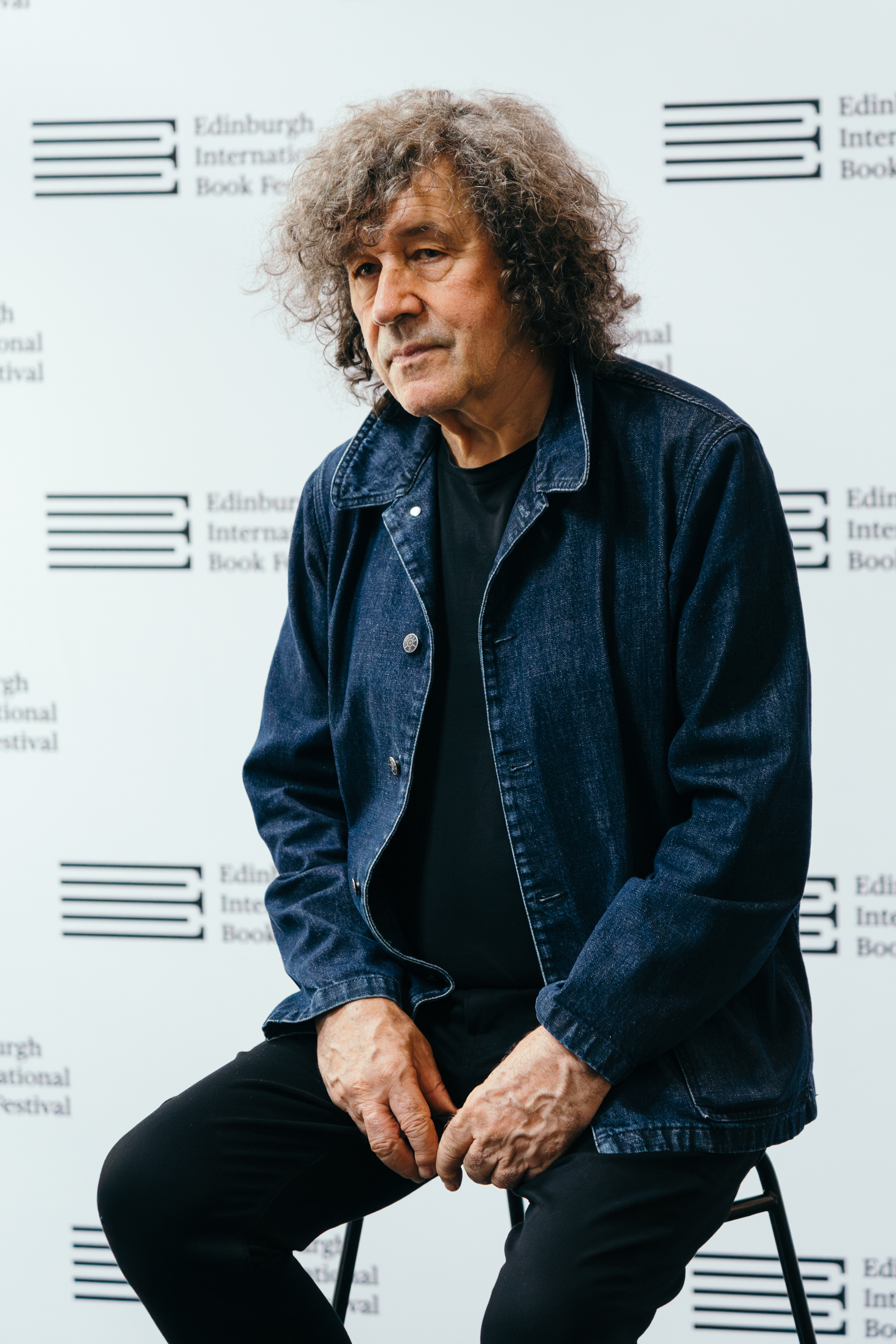
- Rea at the 2025 Edinburgh International Book Festival
- Born: October 31, 1946 (age 80); Belfast, Northern Ireland
- Education: Queen's University Belfast; Abbey Theatre School
- Occupation: Actor
- Years active: 1962–present
- Spouse: Dolours Price (m. 1983; div. 2003)
- Children: 2

Stephen Rea (/ˈreɪ/ ray; born 31 October 1946) is an Irish actor. Born in Belfast, he began his career as a member of Dublin's Focus Theatre, and played many roles on the stage and on Irish television. He came to the attention of international film audiences in Irish filmmaker Neil Jordan's 1992 film The Crying Game, and subsequently starred in many more of Jordan's films, including Interview with the Vampire (1994), Michael Collins (1996), Breakfast on Pluto (2005), and Greta (2018). He also played a starring role in the Hugo Blick 2011 TV series The Shadow Line.

As a stage actor, he is known for his performances at The Gate and Abbey theatres in Dublin, and the Royal Court Theatre in London. He is a co-founder of the Field Day Theatre Company with Brian Friel.

He was nominated for the Academy Award for Best Actor for The Crying Game (1992), and won a BAFTA Award for his role in The Honourable Woman in 2015. In 2020, The Irish Times ranked Rea the 13th greatest Irish film actor of all time.

== Early life and education ==
Stephen Rea was born on 31 October 1946 in Belfast. His father was a bus driver and his mother a housewife. His family was Protestant but sympathetic to Irish nationalism. Rea has described his upbringing as nonreligious.

He studied English at the Queen's University Belfast and drama at the Abbey Theatre School in Dublin.

== Career ==
=== Stage ===
Rea began an association with playwright Stewart Parker when they were students together at the Queen's University Belfast. In the late 1970s, he acted in the Focus Company in Dublin with Gabriel Byrne and Colm Meaney.

Rea helped establish the Field Day Theatre Company in 1980 with Tom Paulin, Brian Friel, Seamus Heaney, and Seamus Deane.

Rea's friendship with American playwright and actor Sam Shepard dates back to the early 1970s, and he starred in Shepard's directorial début of his play Geography of a Horse Dreamer at the Royal Court Theatre in 1974. In 2007, Rea began a successful and acclaimed relationship with both the Abbey Theatre and Sam Shepard, appearing in Kicking a Dead Horse (2007) and Ages of the Moon (2009), both penned by Shepard and also both transferred to New York. Rea returned to the Abbey in 2009 to appear in the world première of Sebastian Barry's Tales of Ballycumber.

Rea starred in Enda Walsh's 2014 play Ballyturk and portrayed Jordan in Out of the Dark, in which he co-stars alongside Julia Stiles, Scott Speedman and Alejandro Furth.

=== Screen ===
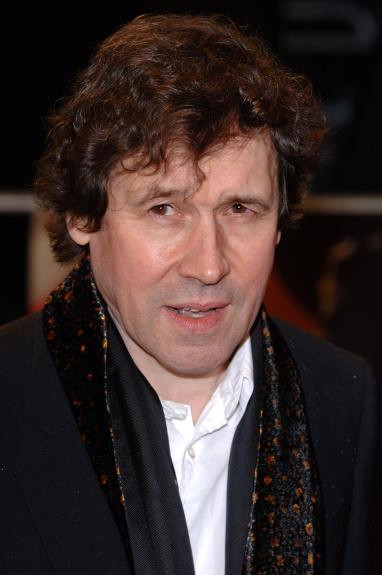
Stephen Rea in 2010

Rea came to international attention when he was nominated for the Academy Award for Best Actor for Irish film-maker Neil Jordan's film The Crying Game in 1992. He is a frequent collaborator with Jordan, starring in his other films Interview with the Vampire (1994), Michael Collins (1996), The End of the Affair (1999), Breakfast on Pluto (2005), and Greta (2018).

In 2011, Rea featured in the BBC crime drama The Shadow Line, playing antagonist Gatehouse.

In 2023, Rea appeared as Frank, husband to Eileen (played by Kathy Bates), in the film The Miracle Club.

=== Voice ===
Rea (credited as Stephen Ray) appears on the 1978 compilation album H Block produced by Christy Moore reading two works by Bobby Sands and one by Brian Ua Baoill.

Rea was hired to speak the words of Gerry Adams when Sinn Féin was under a broadcasting ban from 1988 to 1994. In April 2012, Rea read James Joyce's short story "The Dead" on RTÉ Radio 1. He also narrated for the BBC Radio 4 production of Ulysses for Bloomsday, 16 June 2012.

== Recognition and awards ==
Rea is an Academy Award, Golden Globe Award, and Tony Award nominee, a BAFTA Award winner, and a three-time Irish Film and Television (IFTA) Award winner. He was nominated for a BAFTA Award and for the Academy Award for Best Actor for The Crying Game (1992). He won a BAFTA Award for his role in The Honourable Woman in 2015.

In 2004, in recognition for his contribution to theatre and performing arts, Rea was given honorary degrees from both the Queen's University Belfast and the Ulster University.

In 2020, The Irish Times ranked Rea the 13th greatest Irish film actor of all time.

== Personal life ==
From 1983 until their divorce in 2003, Rea was married to Dolours Price, a former Provisional Irish Republican Army bomber and hunger striker who later became a critic of Sinn Féin. They had two sons.

Rea had already met Price in the 1960s but ten years before their marriage, Price attended a performance by Rea in The Freedom of the City at the Court Theatre in London in 1973, the night before she took part in the 1973 Old Bailey bombing that injured 200 people.

As of 2012, Rea was an Ambassador for UNICEF Ireland.

As of 2020, Rea lives in County Donegal.

== Acting credits ==
=== Film ===
Year	Title	Role	Notes
1970	Cry of the Banshee	Villager	
1982	Angel	Danny	
1984	The Company of Wolves	Young Groom	
1985	The Doctor and the Devils	Timothy Broom	
1985	Loose Connections	Harry	
1990	Life Is Sweet	Patsy	
1992	The Crying Game	Fergus	
1993	Bad Behaviour	Gerry McAllister	
1994	Angie	Noel	
1994	Princess Caraboo	Gutch	
1994	Interview with the Vampire	Santiago	
1994	Prêt-à-Porter	Milo O'Brannigan	
1995	Between the Devil and the Deep Blue Sea	Nikos	
1995	All Men Are Mortal	Fosca	
1995	Citizen X	Lt. Viktor Burakov	
1996	Michael Collins	Ned Broy	
1996	Trojan Eddie	Eddie "Trojan Eddie"	
1996	The Last of the High Kings	Cab Driver	
1997	Fever Pitch	Ray	
1997	The Butcher Boy	Benny Brady	
1997	The Break	Sean Dowd	
1997	Double Tap	Cypher	
1997	Hacks	Brian	
1998	This Is My Father	Mission Priest	Cameo
1998	Still Crazy	Tony Costello	
1999	In Dreams	Dr. Silverman	
1999	Guinevere	Connie Fitzpatrick	
1999	I Could Read the Sky	P.J. Doran	
1999	The Life Before This	Brian	
1999	The End of the Affair	Henry Miles	
2000	The King's Wake	King Connor Mac Neasa	(Voice) Short subject
2001	The Musketeer	Cardinal Richelieu	
2001	On the Edge	Dr. Figure	
2002	FeardotCom	Alistair Pratt	
2002	Evelyn	Michael Beattie	
2003	Bloom	Leopold Bloom	
2004	The I Inside	Dr. Newman	
2004	The Halo Effect	"Fatso"	
2004	The Confessor	McCaran	
2004	Fluent Dysphasia	"Murph"	Short subject
2004	Proud	Barney Garvey	
2004	Control	Dr. Arlo Penner	
2005	Breakfast on Pluto	Bertie Vaughan	
2005	River Queen	Francis	
2005	Tara Road	Colm Maguire	
2006	V for Vendetta	Chief Inspector Eric Finch	
2006	Sisters	Dr. Philip Lacan	
2006	Sixty Six	Dr. Barrie	
2007	Until Death	Gabriel Callaghan	
2007	The Reaping	Father Michael Costigan	
2007	Stuck	Thomas Bardo	
2008	The Devil's Mercy	Tyler	
2008	Kisses	"Down Under" Dylan	Uncredited cameo
2009	Spy(ies)	M. Palmer	
2009	Child of the Dead End	Patrick MacGill	
2009	Nothing Personal	Martin	
2009	The Heavy	Jameson Anawalt	
2009	Ondine	Priest	
2011	Blackthorn	MacKinley	
2011	Stella Days	Brendan McSweeney	
2012	Underworld: Awakening	Dr. Jacob Lane	
2012	Werewolf: The Beast Among Us	Doc	Direct-to-DVD
2013	Tasting Menu	Walter	
2014	Asylum	McGahey	
2014	Styria	Dr. Hill	
2014	Out of the Dark	Jordan	
2015	Ruby Strangelove Young Witch	Danforth	
2015	An Enchanted Ruby	Danforth	
2018	Black '47	Conneely	
2018	Greta	Brian Cody	
2018	Unquiet Graves	Narrator	Documentary about the Troubles
2021	Nightride	Joe	Voice
2023	The Miracle Club	Frank Dunne	

=== Television ===
Year	Title	Role	Notes
1964	Crossroads	Pepe Costa	
1967	Angel Pavement	Second Mate	Episode: "They Arrive"
1967	Sanctuary	Stephen Moriarty	Episode: "The Voice of His Calling"
1969	Z-Cars	Kenny	Episode: "Snout: Part 2"
1970	Softly, Softly: Task Force	Philip Conner	Episode: "Trust a Woman"
1971	Omnibus	Hubert Page	Episode: "Hail and Farewell-George Moore"
1972	The Moonstone	Major Frayne	Episode: "1.1"
1974	Thriller	Arden Buckley	Episode: "K is for Killing" (US Title: "Color Him Dead")
1974–1979	Play for Today	Peter / Chas / Shay	3 episodes
1975–1976	I Didn't Know You Cared	Carter Brandon	13 episodes - (series 1 & 2 only; not in series 3 & 4)
1977	BBC2 Play of the Week	Hollar	Episode: "Professional Foul"
1978	Play of the Month	Constantin	Episode: "The Seagull"
1978	The Professionals	Pellin	Episode: "In the Public Interest"
1978	Thank You, Comrades	Mayakovsky	TV film
1980	Caleb Williams	Tyrell	Episode: "1.1"
1982	Joyce in June	Stanislaus Joyce / McIntosh	TV film
1984	Minder	Roddy Allan	Episode: "Windows"
1984	Four Days in July	Dixie	TV film
1986	Boon	Frank Warren	Episode: "Fools Rush In"
1986	Screen Two	Frankie	Episode: "Shergar"
1987	Lost Belongings	Lenny	2 episodes
1987	Scout	Marshall	TV film
1989	4 Play	Paul	Segment: "Not As Bad as They Seem"
1989	Endgame	Clov	TV film
1990	Not with a Bang	Colin Garrity	7 episodes
1993	Saturday Night Live	Fergus	(Uncredited) Episode: "Miranda Richardson/Soul Asylum"
1993–1995	Performance	Ejlert Lovborg / Seamus Shields	2 episodes
1995	Citizen X	Lieutenant Viktor Burakov	TV film
1996	Crime of the Century	Bruno Hauptmann	TV film
2001	A Scare at Bedtime	Dr. Roger St. Roctor	Episode: "Not What the Doctor Ordered"
2001	Snow in August	Rabbi Judah Hirsch	TV film
2001	Armadillo	Hogg	3 episodes
2001–2002	Horrible Histories	Narrator (voice, UK dub)	26 episodes
2002	Copenhagen	Niels Bohr	TV film
2007	Imeacht Na N'Iarlaí	Aodh Ó Néill, Tiarna Thir Eoghain	Episode: "1"
2008	10 Days to War	Tim Cross	Episode: "These Things Are Always Chaos"
2009	Father & Son	Augustine Flynn	4 episodes
2009	Law & Order: Special Victims Unit	Callum "Cal" Donovan	Episode: "Solitary"
2009	Heidi 4 Paws	The Doctor (voice)	TV film
2010	Single-Handed	Sean Doyle	Episodes: "The Lost Boys: Parts 1 & 2"
2011	Roadkill	Seamus	TV film
2011	The Shadow Line	Gatehouse	6 episodes
2013	Utopia	Conran Letts	5 episodes
2014	The Honourable Woman	Sir Hugh Hayden-Hoyle	8 episodes
2015–2016	Dickensian	Inspector Bucket	16 episodes
2016	War & Peace	Prince Vassily Kuragin	5 episodes
2016	Fir Bolg	Spencer	Episode: "Nochtadh"
2018	Counterpart	Alexander Pope	7 episodes
2018	Thanksgiving	Melchior	3 episodes
2020	The Stranger	Martin Killane	8 episodes
2020	Flesh and Blood	Mark	4 episodes
2022	The English	Sheriff Robert Marshall	6 episodes
2025	Prime Target	Professor James Alderman	5 episodes

=== Theatre ===
Year	Title	Playwright	Venue
1967	Shadow of a Gunman	Sean O'Casey	The Mermaid Theatre, London
1969	Captain Oates' Left Sock	John Antrobus	Royal Court Theatre, London
1971	Crete and Sargent Pepper	John Antrobus	Royal Court Theatre, London
1973	The Freedom of the City	Brian Friel	Royal Court Theatre, London
1973	The Duchess of Malfi	John Webster	7:84 Theatre Company, London
1973	Sargent Musgraves	John Arden	The Gate, Dublin
1973	The White Devil	John Webster	Nottingham Playhouse
1973	Drums in the Night	Bertold Brecht	Hampstead Theatre, London
1974	Geography of a Horse Dreamer	Sam Shepard	Royal Court Theatre, London
1974	Comedians	Trevor Griffiths	Nottingham Playhouse
1980	Translations	Brian Friel	Field Day Theatre Company
1981	Three Sisters	Anton Chekhov adapt. Brian Friel	Field Day Theatre Company
1982	The Communication Cord	Brian Friel	Field Day Theatre Company
1984	High Time	Derek Mahon	Field Day Theatre Company
1984	The Riot Act	Tom Paulin	Field Day Theatre Company
1986	Double Cross	Thomas Kilroy	Field Day Theatre Company
1987	Pentecost	Stewart Parker	Field Day Theatre Company
1989	Saint Oscar	Terry Eagleton	Field Day Theatre Company
2014	Ballyturk	Enda Walsh	Galway International Arts Festival
2014	A Particle of Dread	Sam Shepard	Field Day Theatre Company
2016	Cyprus Avenue	David Ireland	Royal Court Theatre, London
2020	The Visiting Hour	Frank McGuinness	The Gate Theatre, Dublin

== See also ==
- List of Irish actors
- List of Academy Award winners and nominees from Ireland
