= Missed connection =

Personal ad

You were on your bike on the sidewalk (Sunday). I was walking the opposite direction. You had a plastic parrot on your handlebars. I smiled. You said "Hi" and smiled back. You won my undying admiration for not wearing a football jersey. That's it. Coffee or a drink?

— A missed connection from San Diego Magazine, December 2011, p.42

A missed connection is a type of personal advertisement which arises after two people meet but are too shy or otherwise unable to exchange contact details. The "Missed Connections" section of Craigslist gets thousands of ads of this type every month in New York City, San Francisco, and Seattle.

The feature was started by Jim Buckmaster, Craigslist's CEO, after he noticed a common type of posting in their personal ads, which he characterized as "you-smiled-at-me-on-the-subway-platform". He sees the format as addressing a common human need and being ideal for romantic comedy, "Missed Connections give people that second chance...They represent persistence in the face of long odds, which definitely adds to their artistic appeal." A variety of such artistic works have been developed including illustrations, movies, plays, poetry and songs.

Other major cities have similar columns in Craigslist and their own local media. London's Metro newspaper has a "Rush-hour Crush" column for commuters who exchange glances but nothing more. Many connections are re-established and couples have become married in this way, such as "tall rugby player" and "beautiful lady in the red dress with long brown curly hair". Various websites like Gumtree also offer the possibility of reconnecting with missed connections.

== Distribution ==
The nature and location of missed connections have been analyzed. Across the United States in 2013, the breakdown by gender was:

- 59% Man seeking woman
- 27% Man seeking man
- 13% Woman seeking man
- 1% Woman seeking woman

In the Pacific Northwest, the most common location was public transportation. In the Pacific Southwest, it was the gym. In the Northeastern United States, it was the subway and train. In the Midwestern United States, it was the supermarket. In Texas and the Gulf Coast region, it was Walmart.

== Implementation ==
The online format for this on Craigslist scrolls so that postings disappear after 45 days. This gives a second possibility of loss as the posting might not be seen in time to reunite the couple. Protocols for facilitating such encounters more safely have been proposed.

== Art, comedy, movies, plays and poems ==
The topic has been used as a theme by artists and authors. The New York Transit Museum held a special exhibition of such work on Valentine's Day in 2011.

Other artistic uses of the theme include Missed Connections NY, a theatrical presentation of thirteen vignettes and comic songs performed by the Upright Citizens Brigade and the long-running Missed Connections: An Exploration into the Online Postings of Desperate Romantics. One movie was named after the Craigslist feature, Missed Connections. It starred Sting's daughter, Mickey Sumner, and opened at the Savannah Film Festival in 2012.

"Missed Connections," a live, interactive play with magic, conceived for virtual experience, co-written by Jon Tai & Alex Gruhin, performed by magician Jon Tai, and directed and produced by Alex Gruhin, ran from February 2-February 28, 2021 at Chicago's MacArthur and multi-Jeff award winning A Red Orchid Theatre, during the Coronavirus pandemic. The show then received a virtual transfer to 59E59 Theaters off-Broadway in May 2021, as part of a unique co-presentation with A Red Orchid, Kansas City's Oddly Correct Coffee and John Wesley Harding (singer) / Wesley Stace's Cabinet of Wonders. The show, which recouped its investment in less than one week of performances off-Broadway continues to perform virtually, presented by other theater companies across the USA and around the world. The play, a magician’s cosmic love story inspired by the work of Haruki Murakami, Marshall McLuhan and Derren Brown, takes 25 audience members on a roundtrip voyage to the stars in search of the invisible thread that connects them all. It received rave reviews from Chris Jones (drama critic) at the Chicago Tribune and Catey Sullivan at the Chicago Sun-Times (3.5/4 stars).

== Pre digital antecedents ==
Just as "lonely hearts" personal advertisements existed in printed newspapers long before the invention of the internet, so too did "missed connections". The earliest known such advert, at the time called a "Once seen" ad, appeared in The Tatler in 1709. An early example of such a once seen ad was placed by a Samuel Reeves, and read "A gentleman who, on the twentieth instant, had the honour to conduct a lady out of boat at Whitehall Stairs, desires to know where he may wait on her to diclose a matter of concern."

== See also ==
- Brief Encounter
- On the Line
- Serendipity
- Sliding Doors
- "Strangers in the Night"
