= Tom Paulin =

Northern Irish poet, academic and critic (born 1949)

- Born: January 25, 1949 (age 77); Leeds, England
- Education: Annadale Grammar School; Hull University; Lincoln College, Oxford
- Occupations: Poet, critic, academic
- Spouse: Munjiet Kaur "Giti" Khosa
- Children: 2 sons
- Writing career
- Language: English
- Period: 1970s–present
- Notable works: The Invasion Handbook, A State of Justice, The Strange Museum, Liberty Tree, Fivemiletown

Thomas Neilson Paulin (born 25 January 1949) is a Northern Irish poet, academic, and critic. He lives in England, where he was the G. M. Young Lecturer in English Literature at Hertford College, Oxford. In the 1990s and 2000s, Paulin was noted for his frequent appearances on British television as a commentator, particularly on the programme Newsnight Review.

== Early life ==
Paulin is the eldest of three boys and was born in Leeds, England, in 1949. His father, Douglas, was born and raised in Tynemouth. Douglas joined the army and was stationed in Northern Ireland where he met his future wife, Mary (née Robertson), who worked as a doctor in London during the Blitz. On Douglas being appointed as headteacher of the Annadale Grammar School, the family moved to Belfast, Northern Ireland. Tom attended Annadale with his brother Oswyn. Paulin grew up immersed in discussions of politics, history, and ideas, as his parents were moderate unionists and supporters of the Northern Ireland Labour Party. Belfast's intellectual and cultural life in the 1960s, including exposure to contemporary poets such as Seamus Heaney, Derek Mahon, and Michael Longley, and the city's political debates, further influenced him. He also engaged with socialist and Trotskyist ideas as a teenager, reading writers like Isaac Deutscher and joining the Trotskyist Socialist Labour League, though he eventually recognised the primacy of national identity in Northern Ireland, a view which clashed with Trotskyist viewpoints.

After his time at Annadale Grammar School, Paulin went on to read English at the University of Hull (1967–70) before pursuing postgraduate research at Lincoln College, Oxford (1970–72).

== Career ==
Paulin taught at the University of Nottingham from 1972 to 1994, serving as lecturer, reader, and then Professor of Poetry. In 1994 he moved to Oxford as G. M. Young Lecturer in English and Fellow of Hertford College; he retired in 2010 and became an Emeritus Fellow.

Paulin has held a number of visiting academic appointments including a Visiting Associate Professorship at the University of Virginia (1983–1984), a part-time fellowship in creative writing at the University of Reading (1989–1990), and a Visiting Professorship at Columbia University (2002). In 1996, he was invited to give the T. S. Eliot Memorial Lectures at the University of Kent, Canterbury.

Paulin is considered to be among a group of writers from a Unionist background "who have attempted to recover the radical Protestant republican heritage of the eighteenth century to challenge orthodox concepts" of Northern Irish Protestant identity. His passionate arguments and desire for a political poetry reflect the influence of John Milton, according to critic Jonathan Hufstader, though his outrage "often consumes itself in congested anger".

Paulin is most widely known in Britain for his appearances on the late-night BBC arts programmes The Late Show, Late Review and Newsnight Review.

The Field Day Theatre Company was founded by Brian Friel and Stephen Rea in 1980, and in 1981 Paulin was asked to become a board member of the company alongside Seamus Deane, David Hammond, and Seamus Heaney, with Tom Kilroy joining in 1988. Field Day began as a touring theatre project and later developed into a wider cultural and political enterprise associated with pamphlet publication and The Field Day Anthology of Irish Writing.

Paulin's verse play, The Riot Act, an adaptation of Sophocles's Antigone, was first performed by Field Day in 1984, touring in Ireland and later being staged at the Gate Theatre in London and in New York. His pamphlet A New Look at the Language Question launched Field Day's pamphlet series, and in 1991 he edited a section of The Field Day Anthology of Irish Writing titled "Northern Irish Protestants, Oratory, and Writing 1791–1985".

Paulin's papers are held in the Brotherton Collection at the University of Leeds and at Emory University.

== Poetry ==
Paulin began publishing poetry in the mid-1970s. Paulin's poetry has often been read in relation to Northern Irish politics and the histories of Britain and Ireland, including the Second World War. Critics and fellow poets have frequently emphasized the mixture of polemic, historical consciousness, and formal alertness in his work.

=== Early collections ===
Paulin's first collection, A State of Justice (1977) won the Somerset Maugham Award.

His next complete volume The Strange Museum (1980) was followed by the pamphlet The Book of Juniper (1981) with drawings by Noel Connor. Liberty Tree (1983) has garnered particular attention with critics reading the book as an attack on contemporary Protestant Unionism for betraying "the French and Irish Republican principles of '98", while also using satire to castigate the Northern Irish state in the light of colonial history. Archival material relating to The Book of Juniper pamphlet and Liberty Tree, including drafts, proofs, and related correspondence, is held in the Tom Paulin papers as part of the Brotherton Collection at the University of Leeds.

=== Fivemiletown ===
Fivemiletown (1987) marks a turning point in tone and diction in Paulin's work. In an interview in Irish Studies Review (1997), Paulin described how, during the 1980s, he felt "the pull of the regional vernacular" and began to use dialect words, partly as a way of registering "deep fractures" within the language and history of Northern Ireland. In the same interview he argued for "a dictionary of Irish-English, Hiberno-English, Ulster-English" and said he felt "a sense of loss" at not having been taught Irish. Michael Hofmann, in a review of the collection for the London Review of Books, commented on how "linguistic richness on its own, or the tight thematic focus, would have made Fivemiletown a distinguished book: but with both, in harness, it was irresistible. [...] What other British or Irish poet was doing anything like this? [...] to say that Fivemiletown is one of the best books of the eighties isn't enough."

This interest in dialects and the hybridity of regional speech in Ireland continued into his later works. The eponymous poem of The Wind Dog (1999) came out of a commission to commemorate the fifty-year anniversary of BBC Three and was read on the radio prior to its formal publication. Reviewing The Wind Dog, Colin Graham linked the work's arrival to Paulin's attention to "sound before lyricism", concluding that the book's "openness" and "critical multiplicity" made it an "adventurous and important departure in the work of a major contemporary Irish poet." Poet John Kinsella, in The Guardian, further characterized The Wind Dog as being above all "about sound—not just 'music', but the sound of being, of oppression, of liberation, of surprise and humour."

=== The Invasion Handbook ===
Paulin's Second World War poetic sequence was published by Faber in 2002 as The Invasion Handbook. A collage of quotations that brings together snippets of various poetic forms like catalogue, the cento form, epic, and lyric, The Invasion Handbook returns to themes central to much of Paulin's early work: the relation of art to war, national identity, and the search for peace and civic culture. In The Times Literary Supplement, historian Roy Foster characterised the book as a "scatter-gun montage of discordant and challenging voices and visions, from the Treaty of Versailles to the phoney war, it demands rereading and promises to build into something completely new", while literary critic Frank Kermode noted the ambition of the project that regularly switches between "rough, demotic (Northern Ireland slang or dialect) and exotic (lots of German words, passages in French)" registers.

=== Later work ===
Love's Bonfire (2012), Paulin's ninth poetry collection, exemplifies the oscillation between formal control and linguistic vitality characteristic of Paulin's later work. In a review for The Guardian, Kate Kellaway emphasised the collection's apparent spontaneity and casualness that is "only possible because of the absolute control of form, each poem a windbreak for his words." With poems collected from the past decade set largely between Donegal and Oxford, Namanlagh (2025), meditates on memory, historical after-effects, and the experience of aging. John Field described Namanlagh as a work in which "the past lives on in the memory: tactile, vivid and immediate." Namanlagh was shortlisted for the T. S. Eliot Prize 2025 and won the PEN Heaney Prize that same year.

=== Translations and theatre ===
Paulin's The Road to Inver: Translations, Versions and Imitations 1975–2003 (2004) collected his work in this field, and was shortlisted for the T. S. Eliot Prize.

Paulin has written and adapted verse drama throughout his career, including The Riot Act (a contemporary Antigone), Seize the Fire (a version of Prometheus Bound), and a modern-English version of Euripides's Medea. Throughout his work adapting classical drama Paulin has used dialect and modern archetypes to connect antiquity with the present. Discussing his approach to rendering Antigone, Paulin said he imagined Creon "as a kind of puritan gangster," speaking "alternately in an English public-school voice and a deep menacing Ulster growl."

== Criticism and editions ==
Paulin's literary criticism ranges from his first monograph, Thomas Hardy: The Poetry of Perception (1975; second edition 1986), to a seminal on William Hazlitt's style, The Day-Star of Liberty: William Hazlitt's Radical Style. He has published five books of critical essays. Paulin's perhaps best-known piece of literary criticism, Minotaur: Poetry and the Nation State (1992), traces the relationship between poetry, writing, and the formation of the modern nation state. He demonstrates in this work how both "reading and writing are embedded in, and concerned with, the exercise of power" thus seeing the canon "as a tissue of history, shaped and riven by it as we are." Edward Said noted that Minotaur "works brilliantly as explication de texte in an entirely classical sense. But just as important—and this gives the often cheeky venturesomeness of Minotaur its breadth and passion—Paulin cares about human enlightenment and emancipation."

William Hazlitt has remained a key figure for much of Paulin's career, and, in addition to his own criticism on the poet, Paulin has written introductions and edited selections of Hazlitt's work, including The Plain Speaker: The Key Essays (edited by Duncan Wu), The Fight and Other Writings (Penguin Classics), The Pleasure of Hating (Penguin Great Ideas), and Metaphysical Hazlitt: Bicentenary Essays with Uttara Natarajan and Duncan Wu (Routledge, 2005). Paulin was actively involved in the formation and early days of the Hazlitt Society.

=== Anthologies ===
Among other anthologies, Paulin edited The Faber Book of Political Verse (1986) and The Faber Book of Vernacular Verse (1990). David Norbrook described the Faber Book of Political Verse as "a broad conception," from an anthologist with a clear political view but who does not fall into mere polemics, showing instead how a "politically oriented critic can more easily appreciate the verbal and argumentative strategies even of an opponent's political rhetoric than can the moralist looking for inner sincerity and felt life." Seamus Heaney also praised Paulin's Faber Book of Vernacular Verse for its attention to texts that resist "Official Standard" usage "With their lack of punctuation, freedom from standard spelling, and charged demotic ripples, they become a form of Nation Language that rejects the polished urbanity."

== Broadcasting and documentaries ==
Throughout the 1980s, 1990s, and 2000s, Paulin presented and contributed to television documentaries and radio programmes about poets and writers, appearing regularly as a critic on BBC arts programmes including The Late Show, Late Review, and Newsnight Review. Paulin has made a series of television documentaries for the BBC and Channel 4 such as: Soldier Poets (on Keith Douglas and Alun Lewis), Napoleon's Nose (a film about early Irish Republicans in Belfast, directed by David Hammond), and J'accuse: Virginia Woolf, as well as Art That Shook the World: James Joyce's Ulysses. He also contributed to other TV and radio programmes on poets and writers including William Blake, John Clare, W. B. Yeats, Philip Larkin, Seamus Heaney, Ted Hughes, Nadine Gordimer, and Elizabeth Bishop.

== Political views ==
Paulin's writing and public commentary have often engaged questions of British and Irish history, republicanism, and the language of political argument. A consistent strand in his political thinking is the cultural politics of language in Ireland. In his 1983 Field Day pamphlet A New Look at the Language Question, describes a language's history as "a history of possession and dispossession […] of territorial struggles and the establishment of a state."

Paulin has been identified as an Anti-Zionist, an Anti-racist and as an Irish republican. Paulin himself has identified with the radical Anglo-Irish republican tradition through John Milton, Anthony Ashley-Cooper, Francis Hutcheson, Thomas Paine and William Cobbett, extending to Oscar Wilde and James Joyce. As a teenager, Paulin was involved in Trotskyist groups.

Paulin has criticised British military and its political actions in Ireland. In a spat with Germaine Greer on "Latenight Review", he said that the paratroopers responsible for the Bloody Sunday 1972 killings in Derry were "thugs sent in by public schoolboys to kill innocent Irish people. They were rotten, racist, bastards". In 2002, Paulin described his political evolution, noting that he initially believed the Northern Ireland state could be reformed, but came to see it as unsalvageable after Bloody Sunday. As of 2002, he supported the Social Democratic and Labour Party's constitutional approach to a united Ireland while appreciating certain unionist values, though he observes that unionist leaders Edward Carson and James Craig thought the border would be a temporary measure, and the Unionist view of the border as permanent only came into being post-World War II.

Paulin has praised the "patriotism of Hazlitt, Blake and Orwell".

Paulin was a member of the British Labour Party, but resigned circa 2002 after declaring that the government of Tony Blair was "a Zionist government".

=== Killed in the Crossfire controversy ===
In April 2002, Paulin was quoted in the Egyptian newspaper Al-Ahram Weekly calling Brooklyn-born Jewish settlers "Nazis" who "should be shot dead" and describing Israeli actions in Palestine as a "historical obscenity." These remarks, along with his poem Killed in the Crossfire (published in the British newspaper The Observer in 2001), which referred to the Israeli army as the "Zionist SS," led to accusations of anti-semitic sentiment. When asked how he responds to accusations of anti-Semitism in addition to anti-Israeli sentiment, he told the newspaper "I just laugh when they do that to me. It does not worry me at all. These are the Hampstead liberal Zionists. I have utter contempt for them. They use this card of anti-Semitism." Regarding supporters of Israel, Paulin stated, "You are either a Zionist or an anti-Zionist. Everyone who supports Israel is a Zionist." After his comments in Al-Ahram raised controversy, he said in a letter to The Independent and the Daily Telegraph, that his views were "distorted", writing, "I have been, and am, a lifelong opponent of anti-Semitism ... I do not support attacks on Israeli civilians under any circumstances. I am in favour of the current efforts to achieve a two-state solution to the conflict between Israel and the Palestinians."

The immediate institutional fallout occurred at Harvard University, where Paulin had been invited to deliver the prestigious Morris Gray poetry reading. Student and faculty protests, particularly from Jewish organisations, caused the University to cancel the reading in November 2002. Harvard officials expressed regret at the widespread consternation, emphasising that the initial invitation had been based solely on Paulin's accomplishments as a poet. Paulin's cancelled reading "caused a furore" and "the whole faculty discussed the matter before voting to renew the invitation to Paulin." Some students and commentators, however, defended the cancellation as necessary to avoid endorsing statements seen as inhumane, while others framed it as a challenge to academic freedom and free speech. The fallout from the initial protests raised questions about free speech on university campuses, with Jim Shapiro of Columbia University ultimately deriding Harvard's decision as "disastrous," further clarifying that the "idea of rescinding an invitation [to give a lecture] because someone has not passed a political litmus test establishes a very dangerous precedent."

Despite the intensity of the criticism, many observers noted that Paulin's record did not suggest personal anti-Semitism; he had publicly condemned anti-Semitism in figures like T. S. Eliot and Philip Larkin and had long argued for confronting cultural prejudices. Analysts and reviewers highlighted that the extremity of his language (such as the suggestion of violence toward settlers) overshadowed the nuanced humanist principles underpinning his political views. Commentators like Benjamin Paloff in the Boston Review later observed that Paulin's rhetoric often conflated passionate political argument with poetic expression, creating a public perception problem in which his poetry was almost secondary to the controversy over his statements. According to Denis MacShane in Globalising Hatred: The New Antisemitism (2008), it was Paulin's expression of his "anger and anguish at the behaviour of Israeli troops".

== Personal life ==
Paulin met his wife, Munjiet "Giti" Kaur Khosa, in 1967 at the University of Hull and the two married in 1973. Giti arrived in Derry from India in 1957 and grew up in Northern Ireland attending convent schools. They have two sons, Michael and Niall, and at least one grandchild.

== Publications ==
=== Poetry: Main Collections ===
- 1977: A State of Justice, Faber & Faber. Poetry Book Society Choice award.
- 1980: The Strange Museum, Faber & Faber
- 1983: Liberty Tree, Faber & Faber
- 1987: Fivemiletown, Faber & Faber
- 1993: Selected Poems 1972–1990, Faber & Faber
- 1994: Walking a Line, Faber & Faber, Shortlisted for T.S. Eliot Prize.
- 1999: The Wind Dog, Faber & Faber. Shortlisted for T.S. Eliot prize.
- 2002: The Invasion Handbook Faber & Faber
- 2004: The Road to Inver: Translations, Versions and Imitations 1975–2003, Faber & Faber. Shortlisted for T.S. Eliot prize.
- 2012: Love's Bonfire, Faber & Faber
- 2014: New Selected Poems, Faber & Faber
- 2025: Namanlagh, Faber & Faber. Awarded PEN Heaney Prize; shortlisted for T.S. Eliot prize.

=== Pamphlets ===
- 1975: Theoretical Locations, Ulsterman Publications
- 1978: Personal Column, The Honest Ulsterman
- 1981: The Book of Juniper, Bloodaxe
- 1985: The Argument at Great Tew, Willbrook Press
- 2007: The Camouflage School, Clutag Press

=== Poetry in anthologies ===
- 1975: Poetry Introduction 3, Faber & Faber
- 1981: Modern Poets 5, Faber & Faber

=== Plays and dramatic versions ===
- 1985: The Riot Act: A Version of Sophocles' Antigone Faber & Faber. First performed at the Guildhall in Derry, 12 September 1984.
- 1987: The Hillsborough Script: A Dramatic Satire, Faber & Faber
- 1990: Seize the Fire Faber & Faber
- 1994: All the Way to the Empire Room, BBC radio play
- 2010: Medea (new version from Euripides), Nick Hern Books. First performed at the Oxford Playhouse in February 2010.

=== Criticism ===
- 1975: Thomas Hardy: The Poetry of Perception Macmillan
- 1983: A New Look at the Language Question, Field Day (pamphlet no. 1)
- 1984: Ireland and the English Crisis, Bloodaxe
- 1992: Minotaur: Poetry and the Nation State, Faber & Faber
- 1996: Writing to the Moment: Selected Critical Essays 1980–1996, Faber & Faber
- 1998: The Day-Star of Liberty: William Hazlitt's Radical Style, Faber & Faber
- 2003: D. H. Lawrence and "Difference": The Poetry of the Present (with Amit Chaudhuri), Oxford University Press
- 2005: Crusoe's Secret, Faber & Faber
- 2007: The Secret Life of Poems, Faber & Faber

=== Edited volumes, introductions, and selections ===
- 1975: Selected Tales of Henry James (with Peter Messent), Dent
- 1986: The Faber Book of Political Verse (ed.), Faber & Faber
- 1990: The Faber Book of Vernacular Verse (ed.), Faber & Faber
- 1998: William Hazlitt, The Plain Speaker: The Key Essays (introduction; ed. Duncan Wu) Blackwell
- 2000: William Hazlitt, The Fight and Other Writings (introduction), Penguin Classics
- 2004: Elizabeth Bishop, The Complete Poems (introduction), Chatto & Windus
- 2004: William Hazlitt, The Pleasure of Hating (ed.), Penguin Great Ideas 12
- 2004: Rhyming Weavers: & Other Country Poets of Antrim and Down (forward), Blackstaff Press
- 2005: Metaphysical Hazlitt: Bicentenary Essays (co-ed.), Routledge
- 2005: Thomas Hardy, Poems (selected and introduced), Faber "Poet to Poet"
- 2007: D. H. Lawrence, Poems (selected and introduced), Faber "Poet to Poet"

=== Audio ===
- 1983: Seamus Heaney and Tom Paulin, Faber Poetry Cassettes
- 1997: Walking Lines, Faber/Penguin Audiobooks
- 2000: The Writers at Warwick Archive: Tom Paulin, University of Warwick

=== Selected documentaries ===
- 1986: Napoleon's Nose, DBA Television
- 1991: J'accuse: Virginia Woolf, Channel 4
- 1999: Soldier Poets, Channel 4
- 2001: Art That Shook the World: James Joyce's Ulysses, BBC

== Prizes and honours ==
- 1976: Eric Gregory Award
- 1978: Somerset Maugham Award for A State of Justice
- 1982: Geoffrey Faber Memorial Prize (joint winner with Paul Muldoon)
- 1994: T.S. Eliot Prize, shortlisting for Walking a Line
- 1999: T.S. Eliot Prize, shortlisting for The Wind Dog
- 2000: National Endowment of Science, Technology, and the Arts (NESTA) award for The Invasion Handbook
- 2004: T.S. Eliot Prize, shortlisting for The Road to Inver
- 2025: T.S. Eliot Prize, shortlisting for Namanlagh
- 2025: PEN Heaney Prize for Namanlagh
- 2026: Christopher Ewart-Biggs Memorial Prize, special prize for a body of work

=== Honorary degrees ===
- 1987: University of Saskatchewan
- 1995: University of Staffordshire
- 2000: University of Hull
- 2016: University of Nottingham
