= Stewart Parker =

Northern Irish playwright

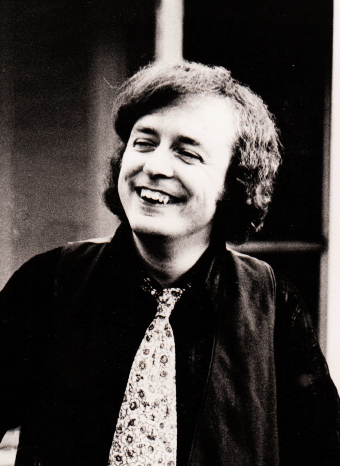
- Parker in the 1970s
- Born: James Stewart Parker; 20 October 1941; Belfast, Northern Ireland
- Died: 2 November 1988 (aged 47); London, United Kingdom
- Occupations: Playwright, poet, columnist
- Writing career
- Period: 1966-1988

James Stewart Parker (20 October 1941 – 2 November 1988) was a Northern Irish playwright, poet, and screenwriter. His works include Spokesong a play with music first produced in 1975; the 1984 film Blue Money, and the 1987 six-part drama for television Lost Belongings, about The Troubles. The Stewart Parker Trust Award, a bursary for new Irish playwrights, was established soon after his death.

== Early life and education ==
Born into a working-class family at 86 Larkfield Road, Sydenham, East Belfast on 20 October 1941, James Stewart Parker was one of the post-Second World War generation to be the first in their family to attain third-level education.

He attended Strand Primary School, then Ashfield Secondary and Sullivan Upper Schools.

At Queen's University Belfast in the early 1960s, he was a founding member of the Belfast Writers' Group convened by Philip Hobsbaum, along with Seamus Heaney. But his long-term passion was theatre. Having been influenced as a schoolboy by the visionary teacher John Malone, he immersed himself in student drama as an undergraduate. His studies were interrupted for a time when he was diagnosed with a bone cancer that resulted in the amputation of his left leg. Parker later captured this experience in his novel Hopdance, edited by his biographer Marilynn Richtarik and published posthumously in 2017.

After embarking on an MA at Queen’s University, he married Kate Ireland in 1964 and immediately left Belfast for the United States, where for several years he taught English literature at Hamilton College and Cornell University in upstate New York. His five years in the United States coincided with seismic cultural events, including the Civil rights movement and protests against the Vietnam War.

Parker's return to Ireland in 1969 coincided with another historical watershed: the outbreak of the conflict known as the Troubles, which reawakened the barely dormant tensions between Northern Ireland's Protestant and Catholic traditions. This conflict shaped the core of Parker’s work as a dramatist, which began as a features writer for BBC Radio.

== Career ==
Parker’s playwriting career began in earnest when his play Spokesong was the runaway success of the 1975 Dublin Theatre Festival. A production the following year in London at the King's Head Theatre subsequently transferred to the West End. The play was then produced at the Long Wharf Theatre in New Haven, Connecticut, in 1978 and by New York City’s Circle in the Square Theatre in 1979, as well as in numerous other venues around the world.

Parker's second play, Catchpenny Twist, was produced by the Abbey Theatre in Dublin in 1977, which also produced Nightshade, his exploration of death and dying conveyed through the prism of stage magic, in 1980. By this time, Parker had also established himself as a television dramatist, with the BBC Play for Today series airing Catchpenny Twist in 1977, the same year it premiered on stage. In 1979, Parker’s television play I'm a Dreamer Montreal, produced by Thames Television, won the Christopher Ewart-Biggs Memorial Prize.

The history of Ireland was one of Parker's chief sources of dramatic material. Heavenly Bodies, commissioned by the Birmingham Rep, centred on the 19th-century theatrical entrepreneur Dion Boucicault and focused on the complexities of Irish national identity and literary recognition. Northern Star, produced by the Lyric Theatre, Belfast in 1984, is the story of the United Irishmen and the doomed Rebellion of 1798, told through the life of Belfast revolutionary Henry Joy McCracken. Uniting political and theatre history, the narrative is developed through at least seven different ages or styles of Irish theatre, from George Farquhar to Samuel Beckett.

Field Day, the Derry-based theatre company co-founded by Stephen Rea and Brian Friel, asked Parker in 1983 to write for them; he eventually gave the company what many consider to be his most profound play. Pentecost is set during the Ulster Workers' Council strike of 1974, when the government of the United Kingdom of Great Britain and Northern Ireland was stopped in its tracks by an insurrection fostered by Loyalists aiming to derail the power-sharing government established by the Sunningdale Agreement.

Pentecost was received with a mixture of admiration and scepticism - in the wake of the hunger strikes and ongoing atrocities in Northern Ireland, it was hard to imagine the positive future suggested in the play.

== Awards ==
1976 Evening Standard Award for Most Promising Playwright
1979 Christopher Ewart-Biggs Memorial Prize for I’m a Dreamer, Montreal (television version)
1981 Giles Cooper Award for The Kamikaze Ground Staff Reunion Dinner (radio version)
1987 Harvey’s Award for Best New Play: for Pentecost

== Personal life ==
Parker moved from Belfast to Edinburgh, Scotland, in 1978. His marriage ended shortly after a subsequent move to London, in 1982. His partnership with television writer Lesley Bruce helped to make the last seven years of his life the most satisfying, both personally and creatively.

== Death and legacy ==
Parker developed cancer for the second time in 1988, and this time it proved fatal. He died on 2 November, less than two weeks after his 47th birthday.

An annual award, the Stewart Parker Trust Award for best Irish debut play, was set up in his name after his death in 1988. Jointly funded by the Arts Council of Ireland and BBC Northern Ireland, there is a cash bursary as part of the award, and the awards were late expanded to include other awards.

In 2008, a "Commemorative Conference & Festival" entitled Stewart Parker: the Northern Star hosted by the Drama Department, compiled and organised by lecturer in drama studies Mark Phelan, was held at Queen's University Belfast.

In the years since Parker's death, his plays have been performed by the Tricycle Theatre in London and in Ireland by Tinderbox, Field Day, Belfast's Lyric Theatre, the Abbey, and, most frequently, by Rough Magic, which took a revival of Pentecost to London’s Donmar Warehouse in 1995 and to the Kennedy Center in Washington, DC, in 2000. Spokesong and Pentecost were revived in a co-production as a double bill by Rough Magic and the Lyric in 2008. Northern Star was revived in 2016 and performed in Dublin, Belfast, and Glasgow.

Several new publications appeared in 2008, the twentieth anniversary of Parker's death. These include:

- A collection of Parker's articles on popular music for The Irish Times entitled High Pop: The Irish Times Column 1970–1976, edited by Gerald Dawe and Maria Johnston (Belfast: Lagan, 2008) ISBN 978-1-904652-59-5
- Dramatis Personae (1986), the John Malone Memorial Lecture given by Parker at Queen's University and later included in Dramatis Personae and Other Writings, a collection of Parker's reviews and articles on culture, edited by Gerald Dawe, Maria Johnston and Clare Wallace (Prague: Litteraria Pragensia, 2008) ISBN 978-80-7308-241-3
- A collection of Parker's plays for television, entitled Stewart Parker: Television Plays, edited by Clare Wallace (Prague: Litteraria Pragensia, 2008) ISBN 978-80-7308-240-6. The plays included are this collection are: Lost Belongings; Radio Pictures; Blue Money; Iris in the Traffic, Ruby in the Rain; Joyce in June; and I’m a Dreamer, Montreal.

== Works ==
=== Stage ===
Spokesong (1975)
The Actress and the Bishop (1976)
Catchpenny Twist (1977)
Kingdom Come (an Irish/Caribbean musical, 1978)
Nightshade (1980)
Pratt’s Fall (1983)
Northern Star (1984)
Heavenly Bodies (1986)
Pentecost (1987)

Parker's stage plays are published by Methuen Drama. Stewart Parker: Plays 1 (2000) includes Spokesong, Catchpenny Twist, Nightshade and Pratt's Fall. Stewart Parker: Plays 2 (2000) includes Northern Star, Heavenly Bodies and Pentecost.

=== Television ===
Catchpenny Twist (1977)
I’m A Dreamer Montreal (1979)
The Kamikaze Ground Staff Reunion Dinner (1981)
Iris in the Traffic, Ruby in the Rain (1981)
Joyce in June (1982)
Radio Pictures (1985)
Lost Belongings (1986)

=== Film ===
Blue Money (1984)

=== Radio ===
Speaking of Red Indians (1967)
Minnie and Maisie and Lily Freed (1971)
Self Portrait (1971)
Requiem (1973)
The Iceberg (1975)
I’m a Dreamer, Montreal (1977)
The Kamikaze Ground Staff Reunion Dinner (1979)
The Traveller (1985)

=== Poetry ===
The Casualty’s Meditation (1966)
Maw (1967)
Paddy Dies (2004)

=== Novel ===
Hopdance: An Autobiographical Novel (2017), Lilliput Press ISBN 978-1-84-351709-2
