= Guardian Fiction Prize =

English-language literary award

The Guardian Fiction Prize was a literary award sponsored by The Guardian newspaper. Founded in 1965 by the Guardian's Literary Editor, W. L. Webb, and chaired by him until 1987, it recognized one fiction book per year written by a British or Commonwealth writer and published in the United Kingdom. The award ran for 33 years before being terminated.

In 1999, The Guardian replaced the Fiction Prize with the Guardian First Book Award, for début works of both fiction and non-fiction, which was discontinued in 2016, with the 2015 awards being the last.

== Winners ==
- 1965: Clive Barry, Crumb Borne
- 1966: Archie Hind, The Dear Green Place
- 1967: Eva Figes, Winter Journey
- 1968: P. J. Kavanagh, A Song and a Dance
- 1969: Maurice Leitch, Poor Lazarus
- 1970: Margaret Blount, When Did You Last See your Father?
- 1971: Thomas Kilroy, The Big Chapel
- 1972: John Berger, G
- 1973: Peter Redgrove, In the Country of the Skin
- 1974: Beryl Bainbridge, The Bottle Factory Outing
- 1975: Sylvia Clayton, Friends and Romans
- 1976: Robert Nye, Falstaff
- 1977: Michael Moorcock, The Condition of Muzak
- 1978: Roy Heath, The Murderer
- 1979: Neil Jordan, Night in Tunisia and Dambudzo Marechera, The House of Hunger
- 1980: J. L. Carr, A Month in the Country
- 1981: John Banville, Kepler
- 1982: Glyn Hughes, Where I Used to Play on the Green
- 1983: Graham Swift, Waterland
- 1984: J. G. Ballard, Empire of the Sun
- 1985: Peter Ackroyd, Hawksmoor
- 1986: Jim Crace, Continent
- 1987: Peter Benson, The Levels
- 1988: Lucy Ellmann, Sweet Desserts
- 1989: Carol Lake, Rosehill: Portrait from a Midlands City
- 1990: Pauline Melville, Shape-Shifter
- 1991: Alan Judd, The Devil's Own Work
- 1992: Alasdair Gray, Poor Things
- 1993: Pat Barker, The Eye in the Door
- 1994: Candia McWilliam, Debatable Land
- 1995: James Buchan, Heart's Journey in Winter
- 1996: Seamus Deane, Reading in the Dark
- 1997: Anne Michaels, Fugitive Pieces
- 1998: Jackie Kay, Trumpet
