= Field Day Theatre Company =

The Field Day Theatre Company is a theatre company founded in Derry, Northern Ireland in 1980 by playwright Brian Friel and actor Stephen Rea.

== History ==
The company's first production in 1980 was Friel's recently completed play, Translations. They chose to rehearse and premiere the play in Derry with the hope of establishing a major theatre company for Northern Ireland. The company's originally stated artistic intention was to bring "professional theatre to people who might otherwise never see it".

Field Day subsequently grew into a broader cultural and political project. Before the company's opening performance, four prominent Northern Irish writers – Seamus Deane, David Hammond, Seamus Heaney and Tom Paulin – were invited to join the project; they would eventually become Field Day's board of directors. The directors and members of the company believed that Field Day had a crucial role to play in the resolution of "the Troubles", by producing analyses of the opinions, myths and stereotypes intrinsic to the political situation in Northern Ireland. Thomas Kilroy joined the board in 1988.

In September 1983, Field Day began publishing a series of pamphlets aimed primarily at the academic community, "in which the nature of the Irish problem could be explored and, as a result, more successfully confronted than it had been hitherto". The first set of three pamphlets were written by the Field Day directors Paulin, Heaney and Deane. With Paulin's Riot Act (1984), the company's output began to reflect the political ideas of the pamphlets in their plays.

In 1987 it staged, in Derry, Stewart Parker's play Pentecost.

In the 1990 introduction to Nationalism, Colonialism, and Literature – a collection of three Field Day pamphlets by Terry Eagleton, Fredric Jameson and Edward Said – Deane wrote that: "Field Day's analysis of the [Northern Irish] situation derives from the conviction that it is, above all, a colonial crisis".

In 2005, Field Day Publications was launched in association with the Dublin school of the Keough-Naughton Institute for Irish studies at the University of Notre Dame, Indiana. With Seamus Deane as general editor, the company's first publication was Field Day Review 1, an annual journal primarily concerned with Irish literary and political culture in an international context, which published essays and interviews by well-known academics. Field Day Review 10 was published in October 2014.

To date, Field Day Publications has published 24 titles in the fields of literary criticism, history, Irish music, cultural studies, art history and 18th-century Irish poetry. Starting in early 2017, Field Day started to commission articles for every issue of Village Magazine, a leftist current affairs publication issued in Dublin. The Field Day Podcast appeared in January 2018.

== Sources and further reading ==
- Deane, Seamus, ed., et al. Field Day Anthology of Irish Writing. 5 volumes. Derry: Field Day, 1991 and 2002.
- Deane, Seamus, ed. Ireland's Field Day. London: Hutchinson, 1985.
- Keating, Sara. "Dramatic field of vision" The Irish Times, 11 October 2006. Retrieved 20 May 2026.
- Eagleton, T. Jameson, F. Said, E. Nationalism, Colonialism and Literature. Minneapolis: University of Minnesota Press, 1990.
- Harrington, John P., ed. Modern Irish Drama. New York: W.W. Norton, 1991.
- McMinn, Joe, Cultural Politics and the Ulster Crisis, in Parker, Geoff (ed.), Cencrastus No. 23, Summer 1986, pp. 35 – 39, ISSN 0264-0856
- Ó Duibhne, Cormac. 'The Field Day Archive'. Dublin: Field Day, 2007.
- O'Malley, Aidan. Field Day and the Translation of Irish Identities: Performing Contradictions. Basingstoke and New York: Palgrave Macmillan: 2011.
- Pine, Richard. Brian Friel and Ireland's Drama. New York: Routledge, 1990.
- Pine, Richard. The Diviner: the Art of Brian Friel. Dublin: University College Dublin Press, 1999.
- Richtarik, Marilynn J. Acting Between the Lines: The Field Day Theatre Company and Irish Cultural Politics 1980–1984. Oxford: Clarendon Press, 1994.
