= The Big Chapel =

1971 novel by Thomas Kilroy

- Author: Thomas Kilroy
- Language: English
- Subject: history, religion
- Set in: Victorian Ireland
- Published: 1971
- Publisher: Pan Books
- Publication place: Ireland
- Pages: 232
- Awards: Guardian Fiction Prize; Heinemann Prize
- ISBN: 978-0330235518

The Big Chapel is a novel written by Thomas Kilroy that was shortlisted for the 1971 Booker Prize and recipient of the Guardian Fiction Prize (also 1971) as well as the Heinemann Prize.

== Plot ==
The Big Chapel – part of the Liberties Revival series – centres on an infamous clerical scandal in Victorian Ireland. Within this story comes the ideas of humanity and ideology, taking a detailed look at the community and depicting life in Ireland with a focus on history and folklore in the region. It is a book that looks at how state education is received in nineteenth-century Ireland.

At times, the book is humorous, at other times tragic. The main character, Father Lannigan, struggles with his revolution, while Master Scully is stuck with too many choices. And then there is Horace Percy Butler and the landlord and amateur scientist who presents a whole tragic comic character.

The major themes in The Big Chapel centre on humanity, ideology, power and religion, depicted through tragic comedy. The novel is about community and dealing with choice. It is littered with one man being forced to make a choice set in historic Ireland.

== Awards ==
The Big Chapel was nominated for the Booker Prize in 1971 and won the Guardian Fiction Prize and the Heinemann Prize.

== Acclaim ==
In February 2008, Kilroy was presented with the PEN Ireland Cross Award for his contribution to literature.

According to Brian Friel, in The Guardian, "…what will keep it permanently vital will be the response it evokes once more from its astonished and grateful readers". Tony Messenger describes the book as "a complex but rewarding work". He adds that it is an "extremely well researched novel about dogma, rigidly sticking to one's views, character definition and the little complexities in life".
