= Article 19 =

British human rights organisation

ARTICLE 19
- Founded: 5 February 1987
- Founder: J. Roderick MacArthur; Greg MacArthur; Aryeh Neier; Martin Ennals
- Type: International nongovernmental organisation
- Registration no.: Charity number 327421
- Purpose: Freedom of expression and freedom of information
- Location: London, UK
- Coordinates: 51°31′25″N 0°6′29″W
- Key people: Robert Lathan (Chair)
- Revenue: £14,990,774 (2024)
- Employees: 169 (2024)
- Website: www.article19.org

Article 19 (stylised ARTICLE 19) is a British international human rights organisation that works to defend and promote freedom of expression and freedom of information worldwide. It was founded in 1987. The organisation takes its name from Article 19 of the Universal Declaration of Human Rights, which states:

Everyone has the right to freedom of opinion and expression; the right includes freedom to hold opinions without interference and to seek, receive and impart information and ideas through any media regardless of frontiers.

== Activities ==
ARTICLE 19 monitors threats to free expression around the globe; lobbies governments to adopt laws that conform to international standards of freedom of expression; and drafts legal standards that strengthen media, public broadcasting, free expression, and access to government-held information. The Law Programme also produces legal analysis and critiques of national laws, including media laws. In addition, ARTICLE 19 intervenes in cases of individuals or groups whose rights have been violated; and provides capacity-building support to non-governmental organisations, judges and lawyers, journalists, media owners, media lawyers, public officials and parliamentarians.

ARTICLE 19's work is organised into five regional programmes — Africa, Asia, Europe, Latin America, the Middle East — a law programme, and a digital programme. It has over 100 staff and regional offices in Bangladesh, Brazil, Kenya, Mexico, Myanmar, Senegal, and Tunisia. It works in partnership with nearly 100 organisations in more than 60 countries around the world.

In early 2024, Russian authorities designated Article 19 as an "undesirable organization."

== Coalitions ==
ARTICLE 19 is a founding member of the International Freedom of Expression Exchange (IFEX), a clearinghouse for a global network of non-governmental organisations that monitor free expression violations worldwide. It is also a member of the Tunisia Monitoring Group, a coalition of 21 free expression organisations that lobbied the Tunisian government to improve its human rights record. And it is the coordinator of the International Partnership Group for Azerbaijan (IPGA), a coalition of international organisations working to promote and protect freedom of expression in Azerbaijan.

ARTICLE 19 is a founding member of the Freedom of Information Advocates (FOIA) Network, a global forum that aims to support campaigning, advocacy and fundraising on access to information through the exchange of information, ideas and strategies. The FOIA Network also aims to facilitate the formation of regional or international coalitions to address access to information issues.

== Description ==
Article 19 1. Everyone shall have the right to hold opinions without interference. 2. Everyone shall have the right to freedom of expression; this right shall include freedom to seek, receive and impart information and ideas of all kinds, regardless of frontiers, either orally, in writing or in print, in the form of art, or through any other media of his choice. 3. The exercise of the rights provided for in paragraph 2 of this article carries with it special duties and responsibilities. It may therefore be subject to certain restrictions, but these shall only be such as are provided by law and are necessary: (a) For respect of the rights or reputations of others; (b) For the protection of national security or of public order (ordre public), or of public health or morals

=== Finances ===
ARTICLE 19 lists its regular financial contributors on its website:

- Swedish International Development Cooperation Agency (Sida)
- UK Department for International Development (DFID)
- Bill and Melinda Gates Foundation
- The Ford Foundation
- Fritt Ord
- Open Society Institute (OSI)
- The William and Flora Hewlett Foundation

=== Leaders ===
Shortly before his death in 1984, J. Roderick MacArthur established a vision for ARTICLE 19 as a global human rights organisation that would focus on censorship issues. His son Greg MacArthur, director of the J. Roderick MacArthur Foundation, set the wheels in motion for the creation of the organisation inspired by an article from the Universal Declaration of Human rights. Through Aryeh Neier—a lawyer and human rights leader who was formerly the executive director of the American Civil Liberties Union (1970–1978) before founding Human Rights Watch in 1978 -- Martin Ennals was appointed to realise the idea. Ennals brought his experience from UNESCO, the National Council for Civil Liberties, and the Nobel Prize-winning Amnesty International, and started the ARTICLE 19 organisation in 1986 with a budget around $1,500,000 and a staff of eight with its first executive director Kevin Boyle.

ARTICLE 19 Executive Directors
Kevin Boyle	1987–1989
Frances D'Souza	1989–1999
Andrew Puddephatt	1999–2004
Agnès Callamard	2004–2013
Thomas Hughes	2013–2020
Quinn McKew	2020–2026

As executive director, Kevin Boyle oversaw the first report that would summarise the current state of censorship on a global scale in a report released in 1988. The ARTICLE 19 report "Information, Freedom and Censorship" established a benchmark from which to move forward. In the report, ARTICLE 19 was critical of the United Kingdom where the government could interfere in the British Broadcasting Company's editorial decisions. Other directors would also criticise the United Kingdom frequently even though the organisation is based in London.

Under the leadership of Boyle, ARTICLE 19 also took up as its first campaign, the defence of one of its own. Among ARTICLE 19's first directors on its board of directors was South African journalist Zwelakhe Sisulu. The Sisulu name was well known worldwide as both of his parents were activists against South Africa's Apartheid system. Sisulu himself had established his own reputation as the leader of a press strike by black journalists in 1980. For this activity, he was arrested and banned from journalism for 3 years. After his disappearance in 1986 and after his arrest was made official, ARTICLE 19 took up the case of its own human rights defender. Sisulu was released two years later.

Frances D'Souza became the organisation's second executive director 4 July 1989.

== See also ==
- Freedom of information legislation
- Johannesburg Principles
