= Reading in the Dark =

1996 novel by Seamus Deane

- First edition cover
- Author: Seamus Deane
- Language: English
- Genre: Novel
- Publisher: Jonathan Cape
- Publication date: 3 October 1996
- Publication place: Northern Ireland
- Media type: Print (Hardback & Paperback)
- Pages: 220 pp (first edition, hardback)
- ISBN: 0-224-04405-2 (first edition, hardback)
- OCLC: 35851435

Reading in the Dark is a novel written by Seamus Deane in 1996. It won the Guardian Fiction Prize, the Irish Times International Fiction Prize, and the Irish Literature Prizes

== Plot, structure and themes ==
The novel is set in Derry, Northern Ireland, and extends from February 1945 through July 1971.

The story is told from the point of view of an unnamed young Irish Catholic boy living in a poor area of Derry. This novel-in-stories is about both the boy's coming of age and the Troubles of Northern Ireland, from the partition of the island in the early 1920s until July 1971, just after the violent Battle of the Bogside took place in Derry. The setting mirrors mid-twentieth century Derry leading into the Troubles. While the narrator is surrounded with violence, chaos, and sectarian division, Derry serves as the place where he grows up, both physically and mentally. Despite the surrounding events, the narrator's tone never slips into complete despair, but maintains a sense of hope and humour throughout.

The main focus of the novel is the young narrator's gradual uncovering of a family secret and the effect of this knowledge on him, and on members of his family. A quote in the frontispiece reads: The people were saying no two were e'er wed But one had a sorrow that never was said.

The book is divided into three main parts, of two chapters each. These chapters are further subdivided into a series of short stories in strict chronological order, anchored in time by month and year, with short precise titles such as "Feet"; "Father"; "Mother"; and "Crazy Joe". This structure provides the reader with telling glimpses of crucial events in the narrator's life: the gloom of grinding poverty and injustice is relieved at times by hilarious and vivacious dialogue. There is a strong emphasis on the division between Catholics and Protestants and how it affected everyone. The power of the Church and the authority of police, atheism versus faith, the nature of courage, subjugation by various hierarchies, family loves and loyalties, the yearning for education, and the impact of economic hardship are central themes .

Seamus Deane has often been asked why "Reading in the Dark" was not called a memoir rather than a novel, because Deane's upbringing was almost identical to that of the main protagonist, but he usually avoids giving a straight answer, which raises the question for some readers about how much truth lies in fiction.

== Critique and commentary ==
Reading in the Dark has been the subject of an essay by Dermot Kelly in Moments of Moment: Aspects of the Literary Epiphany. Kelly describes the work as a "metaphysical detective story in which the clues add up to an epiphany of entrapment...Deane's novel excavates nationalist alienation with devastating singlemindedness" (p. 435).

He also comments on Deane's art as a poet, "rehears[ing] certain images until they become emblematic", in this case a confrontation between republican gunmen and loyalist police.

In Secret Hauntings Linden Peach highlights the secrecy which "has been such a feature of Irish cultural life", and which is portrayed in this work with great poignancy. Deane is concerned with "the impact of concealment" particularly on "the mother figure upon which this burden is most spectacularly visited... Deane's novel seems all the more terrible for being located in an apparently ordinary domestic setting". Peach also discusses the way in which Deane's novel incorporates religious symbolism - not only in the way the characters lead their lives, but also in the similarities between Biblical events such as Christ's betrayal and burial and the betrayal and entombment of Uncle Eddie at the Fort. (p. 50).

The novel has also been discussed by Amy McGuff Skinner in her 2007 Ph. D. dissertation Intimate Terror: Gender, Domesticity, and Violence in Irish and Indian Novels of Partition. Here Deane is quoted as saying: "What we misleadingly call ordinary life is destroyed by politics in our part of the world, generation after generation. I had to show how that happens." (p. 161) and further: "There's no talking cure, no implication that by revealing everything you will somehow overcome it". (p. 176)

In her work, McGuff Skinner cites critical writing by Elmer Kennedy-Andrews, Gerry Smyth, as well as a review by Andrew O'Hehir at Salon.

History Lessons: Post-colonialism and Seamus Deane's Reading in the Dark, by Liam Harte:"...an analysis of the inter-relationship of Irish history, politics, and culture".

== Awards and recognition ==
Reading in the Dark won the Guardian Fiction Prize, the Irish Times International Fiction Prize and Irish Literature Prizes, and is a New York Times Notable Book. It also won the 1996 South Bank Show Award for Literature, and was also shortlisted for the Booker Prize in 1996.

It has been translated into 20 languages.

== Quotations from Reading in the Dark ==
The page numbers are taken from the Vintage paperback edition of Reading in the Dark (1997).

"On the stairs, there was a clear, plain silence." (p. 5)

"...lino from which the original pattern had been polished away to the point where it had the look of faint memory." (p. 5)

"The dismembered streets lay strewn all around the ruined distillery where Uncle Eddie had fought, aching with a long, dolorous absence." (p. 34)

"So broken was my father's family that it felt to me like a catastrophe you could live with only if you kept it quiet, let it die down of its own accord like a dangerous fire." (p. 42)

"I felt we lived in an empty space with a long cry from him ramifying through it. At other times, it appeared to be as cunning and articulate as a labyrinth, closely designed, with someone sobbing at the heart of it." (p. 43)

"...I imagined the living rats that remained, breathing their vengeance in dull miasmic unison deep underground." (p. 80)

"When we came into the kitchen, my mother looked up and the whole history of his family and her family and ourselves passed over her face in one intuitive waltz of welcome and then of pain". (p. 136)
