= Equus Press =

Equus Press (Écriture en Quête d'Usage), is a London-based book publishing company. Founded in 2011, it focuses on publishing experimental Anglophone writers and is concerned primarily with English language writing from outside of normal English-speaking areas.

Since it was established, Equus Press has published the works of such authors as Ansgar Allen, Louis Armand, Daniela Cascella, Mike Corrao, Thor Garcia, D. Harlan Wilson, Harold Jaffe, Ryan Madej, Richard Makin, Ken Nash, Damien Ober, Phillip O’Neil, Michael Rowland, Philippe Sollers, Holly Tavel, RG Vasicek and Zak Ferguson.

In April 2013, Equus Press published Louis XXX (Georges Bataille) in a translation by Stuart Kendall. 2014 saw the release of Cairo (Louis Armand), a novel shortlisted for the 2014 Guardian Not-the-Booker Prize, and the novel Doctor Benjamin Franklin's Dream America (Damien Ober) which deals with an alternative American colonial history.
