= Carol Lake =

English author

Sylvia Riley, better known by her pen-name Carol Lake, is an English author. She was the winner of the Guardian Fiction Prize in 1989 with Rosehill: Portrait from a Midlands City. She also wrote Switchboard Operators, upon which the BBC drama series The Hello Girls was based.

During the 1960s, Riley was a member of the International Marxist Group in Nottingham, where she lived and worked at the bookshop run by Pat Jordan.

== Works ==
- Lake, Carol (1989). Rosehill: Portrait from a Midlands City. ISBN 9780747503019.
- Lake, Carol (1997). Switchboard Operators. Bloomsbury. ISBN 9780747534907.
- Lake, Carol (September 2008). Wendy and Her Year of Wonders. United Writers. ISBN 9781852001339.
- Lake, Carol (November 2009). Those Summers at Moon Farm. United Writers. ISBN 9781852001414.
- Riley, Sylvia (2019). Winter at the Bookshop: Politics and Poverty. St Ann's in the 1960s. Five Leaves Publications. ISBN 9781910170663.
