= Kevin Boyle (lawyer) =

Christopher Kevin Boyle
- Born: 23 May 1943; Newry, County Down, Northern Ireland
- Died: 25 December 2010 (aged 67)
- Other name: Kevin Boyle
- Education: Queen's University Belfast (law); Cambridge University (criminology)
- Employer: University of Essex
- Organization(s): Irish Centre for Human Rights (1980), Article 19 (1986–1989), Essex Human Rights Law Centre (1990–2003 & 2006–07)
- Known for: human rights activism
- Title: Emeritus Professor
- Spouse: Joan Smyth Boyle
- Parent(s): Louis & Elizabeth Boyle
- Relatives: Sons Mark & Stephen Boyle
- Awards: Lawyer of the Year, 1998

Christopher Kevin Boyle (23 May 1943 – 25 December 2010) was a Northern Irish-born human rights activist, barrister and educator. He was among the first in the academic law community to engage in human rights activism.

Born and brought up in Newry, Boyle studied law at Queen's University Belfast. He was a lecturer in law at Queen's when he took part in the 1969 People's Democracy march from Belfast to Derry which was attacked by loyalists at Burntollet. He was later involved in the Northern Ireland Civil Rights Association. Boyle's brother, Louis Boyle, also an alumnus of Queen's, was at the time active as a Catholic Unionist, and unsuccessfully sought to be the Unionist and Conservative candidate for South Down in the 1969 Stormont elections.

In the 1970s Boyle took up a post at University College, Galway (UCG, now the National University of Ireland, Galway). He became dean of the Faculty of Law in 1978, and in 1980 established the UCG human rights centre. In the 1980s he helped to develop the Essex Human Rights Law Centre, founded by Professor Malcolm Shaw, at the University of Essex in Colchester, England.

Boyle was involved in several missions on behalf of Amnesty International in the 1980s. Later, he served as the first director of the human rights NGO Article 19 from 1986 to 1989. In 1990 he became director of the Human Rights Centre at Essex, holding that position until 2001.

In 1998, Boyle was named Liberty's Lawyer of the Year, alongside Françoise Hampson, for their work advancing human rights claims before the European Court of Human Rights. He was based in Geneva from 2001 to 2002 as a special advisor to Mary Robinson during her time as UN High Commissioner for Human Rights, returning to Essex University Human Rights Centre, where he again served as director in 2006–07.

Boyle was called to the bar in Northern Ireland, in the Republic of Ireland, and in England and Wales.

The archives of Kevin Boyle's work are housed at the James Hardiman Library at the National University of Ireland, Galway. These archives consist of over one hundred boxes of printed books and manuscripts and are a major resource for the teaching and study of human rights.

A biography, Are you with me? Kevin Boyle and the rise of the human rights movement, by Mike Chinoy will be published in March 2020.

== Awards ==
- Liberty and Law Society Gazette, Lawyer of the Year (shared with Françoise Hampson), 1998.

== Writings ==
- Kevin Boyle and Tom Hadden (1985), Ireland – A Positive Proposal.
- Kevin Boyle (1995), "Stock-Taking on Human Rights: The World Conference on Human Rights, Vienna 1993" in David Beetham (ed.), Politics and Human Rights, Wiley-Blackwell, ISBN 0-631-19666-8.
- Kevin Boyle and Juliet Sheen (1997), Freedom of Religion and Belief: A World Report, Taylor & Francis, ISBN 978-0-415-15978-4.
- Kevin Boyle and Cherian George (2008), "Free speech: The emerging consensus", Straits Times (Singapore), 10 December 2008, A26.
