= Lost Belongings =

TV play by Stewart Parker

Lost Belongings is a television play by Northern Ireland playwright Stewart Parker about The Troubles in Northern Ireland. Set in 1980 in Belfast and London, it was screened as a six-part drama, made for Euston Films and Channel 4 and broadcast on ITV and Channel 4 in 1987. The producer was Barry Hanson. with Northern Ireland actors Harry Towb and Stephen Rea in two of the leading roles.

Parker's screenplay was published in 2008.

== Episodes ==
No.	Title	Directed by	Written by	Original release date
1	"Deirdre"	Tony Bicât	Stewart Parker	7 April 1987
2	"Buck Alec"	Tony Bicât	Stewart Parker	14 April 1987
3	"A Wanted Man"	Tony Bicât	Stewart Parker	21 April 1987
4	"Lenny Leaps In"	Tony Bicât	Stewart Parker	28 April 1987
5	"The American Friend"	Tony Bicât	Stewart Parker	5 May 1987
6	"House on Fire"	Tony Bicât	Stewart Parker	12 May 1987
