= Brendan Duddy =

Northern Irish businessman (1936–2017)

Brendan Duddy (10 June 1936 – 12 May 2017) was a businessman from Derry, Northern Ireland, who played a key role in the Northern Ireland peace process, which ended most of the violence of the Troubles in the 1990s. A notable Catholic republican, who was a pacifist and firm believer in dialogue, Duddy became known by MI6 as "The Contact". In his book, Great Hatred Little Room: Making Peace in Northern Ireland, Tony Blair's political advisor Jonathan Powell described Duddy as the "key" which led to discussions between republicans and MI6, and ultimately the Northern Ireland peace process.

== Biography ==
Duddy ran a fish and chip shop in the late 1960s which was supplied with beef burgers, from a supplier whose van driver was Martin McGuinness, who would eventually become a leader within the Provisional Irish Republican Army and Sinn Féin. Duddy was first approached by Secret Intelligence Service (MI6) officer Frank Steele in the early 1970s, but turned down the approach .

In light of the dissolution of the Parliament of Northern Ireland in 1972, Duddy's role as an intermediary started in January 1972, when asked by friend and Derry's Chief Police Officer Frank Lagan to persuade the Official Irish Republican Army and the Provisional IRA to remove their weapons from the Bogside. Both sides complied, but the Official IRA retained a few weapons for defensive purposes. After thirteen unarmed civil rights marchers were shot dead by British Parachute Regiment troops in what became known as Bloody Sunday, Duddy warned Lagan: "This is absolutely catastrophic. We're going to have a war on our hands."

In the aftermath of the events of Bloody Sunday, MI6 agent Michael Oatley arrived in Belfast in 1973, seeking to understand the situation in Northern Ireland and create a communications channel between the IRA and the British Government. Duddy became the intermediary for communications between the two sides. and these led to the IRA ceasefire of 1975/76.

Duddy and Oatley were the main channel of communications between the British Government and the IRA leadership during the 1981 Irish hunger strike. Duddy was codenamed 'Soon' by the British. Over the period of 4–6 July 1981 they exchanged many telephone calls, with Duddy urging the "utmost haste" on the part of the British, because "the situation would be irreparably damaged if a hunger striker died". He suggested steps which could be taken to give the Provisional IRA a way of ending the strike. British Prime Minister Margaret Thatcher personally amended the text of an offer which was conveyed to the IRA through Duddy, but the British considered the reply unsatisfactory and did not continue to negotiate through Duddy; hunger striker Joe McDonnell died the following day.

In November 1991, as his now friend Oatley was about to retire from MI6 service, Duddy called Oatley to a diner in Derry. When dinner had finished, McGuinness entered the property. During the meeting, McGuinness and Oatley discussed options for moving the situation forward. A few weeks later, Duddy was pursued by a British businessman who wanted to create jobs in Derry. In the first meeting, the businessman produced a letter from then Northern Ireland Secretary Peter Brooke, introducing the "businessman" as Oatley's MI6 successor. Duddy called the MI6 agent "Fred", and acting as the go-between they successfully negotiated a ceasefire. Talks between McGuinness and representatives of the British government were held secretly in his house.

After the end of the Troubles, Duddy served as a member of the Northern Ireland Policing Board and helped broker negotiations related to the marching season. Duddy also testified to the Bloody Sunday Inquiry, with regards his role and actions of both sides.

On 26 March 2008, the BBC broadcast a documentary entitled The Secret Peacemaker about Duddy, directed by Peter Norrey, and presented by Peter Taylor, a journalist who had known Duddy was 'the link' for ten years.

In the spring of 2009, Duddy donated his private archives to the University of Galway's James Hardiman Library, where they were made available to researchers starting in 2011 after they were archivally listed (restrictions have been placed on some items). The archives chart Duddy's involvement in the peace process from 1972 to 1993, and his ongoing interest and correspondence relating to Northern Ireland up to 2007.

Duddy died on 12 May 2017 at the age of 80.
