= Barry Hanson =

British film producer (1943–2016)

Barry Hanson (10 August 1943–20 June 2016) was a British television and film producer.

Hanson read English at Newcastle University, taught at Bradford Grammar School then went to work on publicity at Harrogate Theatre. He worked at the Royal Court Theatre, London in publicity then as an assistant director and directed. He then worked for Alan Plater.

At Pebble Mill Studios, Hanson produced Second City Firsts (1973-74). Then for ITV he made The Naked Civil Servant (1975). He joined Thames TV as a producer director under Verity Lambert and made The Long Good Friday for film when Thames refused to make it for television.

Christopher Hampton wrote "From the Royal Court, Barry brought with him an instinctive sense of commitment to the directors he worked with... and, even more strongly, to the writers... In disputes with management, he invariably took the side of the artist." Hanson made four films with Stephen Frears, who recalled that "Barry was always on the side of good work: he could make your head spin with excitement."

== Selected films ==
- The Naked Civil Servant (1975) – producer
- The Long Good Friday (1979) – producer
- Bloody Kids (1980) – producer
- Runners (1983) – producer
- Morons from Outer Space (1985) – producer
- Christmas Present (1985) – producer
- Lost Belongings (1987) – producer
