= David Hammond (broadcaster) =

Northern Irish broadcaster and documentary filmmaker

David Hammond (1928-2008) was a broadcaster, documentary film-maker and folk singer from Northern Ireland.

== Life and work ==
Hammond was born in Belfast in 1928, July and educated at Methodist College. He then trained as a teacher at Stranmillis College. He taught for several years in primary schools and then took up a post as a teacher at Orangefield Boys' Secondary School. Among his many pupils were Van Morrison and Brian Keenan.

In 1964 he was appointed to the education department of BBC Northern Ireland. In this role he collaborated with others in the production of many films about life in Northern Ireland. These included Today and Yesterday in Northern Ireland, Explorations, and the memorial of life in the Belfast shipyards, Steel Chest, Nail in the Boot, and the Barking Dog.

He left the BBC in 1986 and established Flying Fox film company. He produced many award-winning programmes including Dusty Bluebells (1971) about Belfast children's street games.

He was a member of the board of the Field Day Theatre Company.

== Awards ==
His films and life were celebrated at the 2003 Celtic Film Festival in Belfast. BBC Northern Ireland commissioned a six-part series on his life and work called David Hammond’s Ireland. Dublin City University awarded him an honorary doctorate.
