= Seamus Deane =

Irish writer and critic (1940–2021)

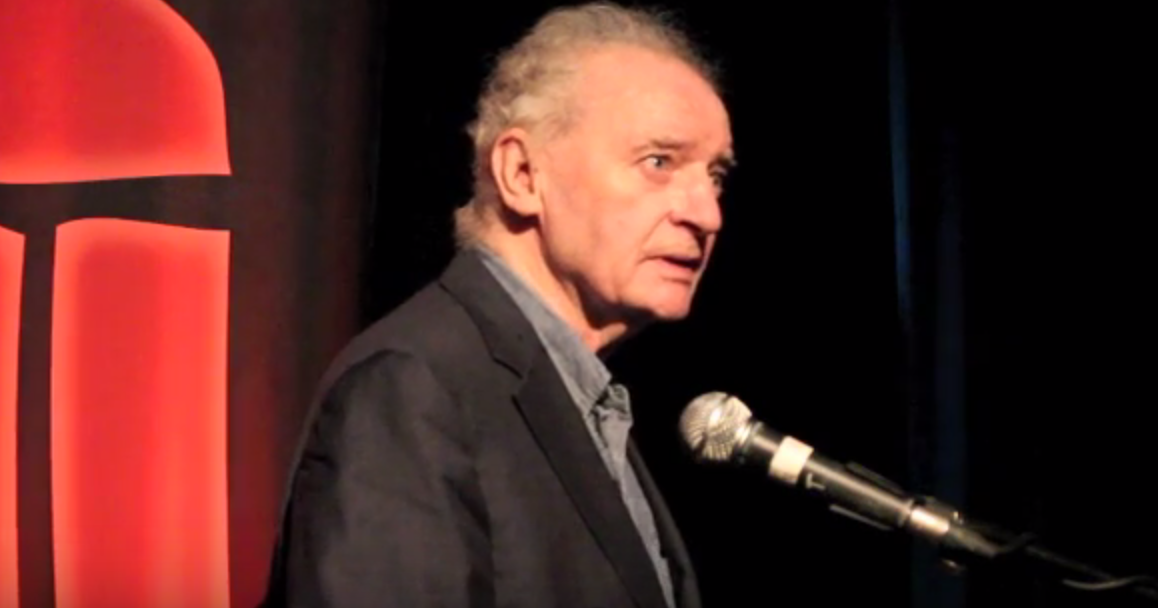
- Seamus Deane in 2015
- Born: 9 February 1940; Derry, Northern Ireland
- Died: 12 May 2021 (aged 81); Dublin, Republic of Ireland
- Education: Queen's University Belfast; Pembroke College, Cambridge
- Scientific career
- Fields: Literary criticism, poetry, fiction, postcolonialism

Seamus Francis Deane (9 February 1940 – 12 May 2021) was a Northern Irish poet, novelist, critic, and intellectual historian. He was noted for his debut novel, Reading in the Dark, which won several literary awards and was nominated for the Booker Prize in 1996.

== Early life ==
Seamus Francis Deane was born in Derry, Northern Ireland, on 9 February 1940. He was the fourth child of Frank Deane and Winifred (Doherty), and was brought up as part of a Catholic nationalist family. Deane attended St. Columb's College in his hometown, where he befriended fellow student Seamus Heaney. He then attended Queen's University Belfast (BA and MA) and Pembroke College, Cambridge (PhD). Although he too became noted for his poetry, Deane chose to go into academia instead. He worked as a teacher in Derry, with Martin McGuinness being one of his students. McGuinness later recalled how Deane was "gentle, kind and never raised his voice at all, an ideal teacher who was very highly thought of".

== Career ==
After graduating from Cambridge, Deane taught at Reed College, Portland, Oregon during the 1960s and the University of California, Berkeley during the 1970s. Over the next two decades, he taught American college juniors part-time at the School of Irish Studies in the Ballsbridge section of Dublin. He was a professor of Modern English and American Literature at University College Dublin until 1992. Deane subsequently relocated to the University of Notre Dame, Indiana, as the Donald and Marilyn Keough Chair of Irish Studies, from which he retired as professor emeritus.

Deane was a member of the Royal Irish Academy and a founding director of the Field Day Theatre Company, together with Heaney, Tom Paulin, and David Hammond.

Deane was the co-editor of Field Day Review, an annual journal of Irish studies. He also served as general editor of the Penguin Classic James Joyce series and of Critical Conditions, a series in Irish Studies which was jointly published by the University of Notre Dame Press and Cork University Press. He co-founded the book series Field Day Files, which contained key works by David Lloyd, Joe Cleary, Marjorie Howes, and Kerby A. Miller.

== Personal life ==
Deane's first marriage was to Marion Treacy. Together, they had four children: Conor, Ciarán, Cormac and Émer. He was in a civil partnership with Emer Nolan until his death; they had one child together (Iseult).

Deane died on 12 May 2021 at Beaumont Hospital in Dublin. He was 81, and suffered a short illness prior to his death.

== Works ==
The first collection of Deane's poetry, Gradual Wars, was published in 1972 and received the AE Memorial Award for Literature. His first novel, Reading in the Dark, was published in 1996 and was partly autobiographical. It won the 1996 Guardian Fiction Prize and the 1996 South Bank Show Award for Literature, is a New York Times Notable Book, won the Irish Times International Fiction Prize and the Irish Literature Prize in 1997, besides being shortlisted for the Booker Prize in 1996. The novel was translated into more than 20 languages.

He was also the general editor of the monumental Field Day Anthology of Irish Writing, which was 4,000 pages long and whose first three volumes were released in 1990. It was later criticised for excluding the voices and experiences of Irish women. Deane responded, saying, "To my astonishment and dismay, I have found that I myself have been subject to the same kind of critique to which I have subjected colonialism … I find that I exemplify some of the faults and erasures which I analyse and characterize in the earlier period". He went on to commission an additional two volumes of women's writing, which were published in 2002.

In his criticism, Deane brought a postcolonialist interpretation to historical and literary works from the Irish, British, and French traditions in particular. His critical writings include:

- Celtic Revivals: Essays in Modern Irish Literature 1880–1980 (1985)
- A Short History of Irish Literature (1986)
- The French Enlightenment and Revolution in England 1789-1832, Harvard University Press, (1988)
- Strange Country: Modernity and Nationhood in Irish Writing since 1790, Oxford (1997)
- Foreign Affections: Essays on Edmund Burke (2004)

His poetry includes:

- While Jewels Rot (1966)
- Gradual Wars (1972)
- Rumours (1977)
- History Lessons (1983)
- Selected Poems (1988)

== See also ==
- List of Northern Irish writers
