= Marilynn Richtarik =

Marilynn Richtarik is an American professor of English at Georgia State University who teaches English literature and specialises in 20th-century literature from Northern Ireland. She is the biographer of Belfast playwright Stewart Parker.

Richtarick was raised in Lawrence, Kansas and was educated at Harvard University and at Oxford University, where she was a Rhodes Scholar.

In 2017, as a Fulbright Scholar, she researched and taught at Queen's University Belfast.

Richtarik's 2023 book, Getting to Good Friday: Literature and the Peace Process in Northern Ireland, was shortlisted for the Christopher Ewart-Biggs Memorial Prize in the 2022-2023 cycle, though she ultimately lost to Derry Girls.

== Publications ==
- Getting to Good Friday: Literature and the Peace Process in Northern Ireland. Oxford: Oxford University Press, 2023. 274 pp. ISBN 9780192886408
- Richtarik, Marilynn (2019). "Forging a Usable Past: Brian Friel's Making History". ELH: English Literary History. 86 (4): 1089–1123. doi:10.1353/elh.2019.0040. ISSN 0013-8304. JSTOR 26866629.
- Stewart Parker: A Life. Oxford: Oxford University Press, 2012. 448 pp. ISBN 978-0199695034
- Richtarik, Marilynn (2002). "Stewart Parker at Queen's University, Belfast". The Irish Review. 29 (29): 58–69. doi:10.2307/29736073. JSTOR 29736073.
- Acting Between The Lines: The Field Day Theatre Company and Irish Cultural Politics 1980–1984. Oxford: Clarendon Press, 1995. 356 pp. ISBN 9780198182474

=== As editor ===
- Parker, Stewart. Hopdance: An Autobiographical Novel, Dublin: Lilliput Press, 2017, 176 pp. ISBN 978-1-84-351709-2

== Personal life ==
Richtarik married journalist Matt Bolch in 2001. They have a son together.
