= Michael Oatley =

British government official (1935–2026)

Michael Oatley CMG, OBE
- Born: Michael Charles Oatley; 18 October 1935
- Died: 29 June 2026 (aged 90)
- Occupations: Intelligence officer SIS/MI6 1959–1991; International intelligence consultant 1991–?

Michael Charles Oatley CMG, OBE (18 October 1935 – 29 June 2026) was a British Secret Intelligence Service (MI6) officer, involved in the resolution of "The Troubles" in Northern Ireland. He directed MI6 operations in the Middle East, 1984–1988, and in Europe, 1988–1991. He was responsible for counter-terrorist operations from 1985–1988.

Posted to Belfast in March 1973, notionally as Assistant Political Adviser to the Secretary of State for Northern Ireland, William Whitelaw, Oatley soon became convinced of the need to develop dialogue with the leadership of the Provisional IRA with a view to influencing it in the direction of political action.

By late 1974, despite the prohibition of any such contacts following the embarrassment of Whitelaw's attempt to negotiate in 1972, he succeeded in establishing three secure lines of potential communication, the most promising of which was via a Catholic businessman from Derry, Brendan Duddy.

In a partnership lasting two decades the two men developed a secret back-channel link between the British Government and the IRA leadership which operated sporadically from 1973 until the 1990s. Its first fruit was the IRA's 1975-1976 ceasefire. When this ended in response to the resumption of loyalist paramilitary killings, the link continued in being without official sanction but was used in ending the first hunger strike at the Maze Prison in 1981. It eventually led in February 1991 to a crucial meeting between Oatley and Martin McGuinness, which led to a resumption of dialogue and to the Northern Ireland peace process, opening the way to the Good Friday Agreement in 1998.

Jonathan Powell, Tony Blair's former Chief of Staff, described the three major times the back-channel was used: the negotiation of the IRA ceasefire in the mid-1970s; during the first IRA hunger strike in 1980; and in the early stages of the peace process in the 1990s.

Peter Taylor's book Behind the Mask: The IRA and Sinn Fein, describes Oatley as the most important British agent to have worked in Northern Ireland.

Oatley died on 29 June 2026, aged 90.
