= Litteraria Pragensia =

Czech publishing house

Litteraria Pragensia Books (LPB) is an independent press based at the Centre for Critical and Cultural Theory at the Philosophy Faculty of Charles University in Prague, Czech Republic. Active since 2002, LPB has been periodically releasing new titles from the world of contemporary poetics, literature, critical theory and cultural studies. It is staffed by an international editorial board of professors, including Louis Armand (Prague), Michael Groden (Western Ontario), Marjorie Perloff (Stanford), Ondrej Pilny (Prague), Martin Prochazka (Prague), Jean-Michel Rabaté (Pennsylvania), and Clare Wallace (Prague). 2012 marked the release of LPB's fortieth book title. Additionally, LPB annually publishes the international poetics and arts magazine VLAK.

LPB has published work by Slavoj Zizek, Hélène Cixous, Bernard Stiegler, Gayatri Spivak, Stephan Greenblatt, Jerome J. McGann, Natalie Zemon Davies, Mark Amerika, Roy Ascott, Rachel Blau DuPlessis, Mark Poster, McKenzie Wark, Gregory L. Ulmer, Geert Lovink, Arthur & Marilouise Kroker, Benjamin H. Bratton, Zoe Beloff, Darre006E Tofts, Donald F. Theall, Johanna Drucker, Hartmut Winkler, Lisa Jarnot, Niall Lucy, Rebecca D'Monte, Simon Critchley, Christian Bok, Mairead Byrne, Laurens De Vos, Johannes Birringer, Thomas Docherty, Richard Kearney, J.H. Prynne, Jena Osman, Michael Farrell, Allen Fisher, Vincent Katz, Kyle Schlesinger, Stephanie Strickland and John Wilkinson, among others.

== Journals ==
- Litteraria Pragensia (Editor-in-Chief: Martin Prochazka; biannual) (ISSN 0862-8424)
- HYPERMEDIA JOYCE STUDIES (Electronic Journal of James Joyce Scholarship ) (Editor: David Vichnar; biannual) (ISSN 1801-1020)
- VLAK (Contemporary Poetics and the Arts) (Editors: Louis Armand, Edmund Berrigan, Carol Watts, David Vichnar, Clare Wallace; biannual)
- RHIZOMES (Cultural Studies in Emerging Knowledge) (Editors: Ellen E. Berry, Carol Siegel; biannual) (ISSN 1555-9998)
