= Missed Connections: An Exploration into the Online Postings of Desperate Romantics =

- Formation: April 29, 2011
- Type: Theatre group
- Purpose: comedy
- Artistic director: Ricky Dunlop
- Notable members: Jennifer Anderson, Ricky Dunlop, Michael Lorz & Jake McKenna
- Website: www.missedconnectionsshow.com

Missed Connections: An Exploration into the Online Postings of Desperate Romantics is a live comedy show conceived by Ricky Dunlop, who co-created and first performed the show with Jennifer Anderson, Jake McKenna, and Lauren Roth in 2011. On stage, a varied cast of comedians take on the sometimes touching, sometimes torrid (and almost always grammatically incorrect), postings on Craigslist’s "missed connections" section. The show, being equal parts stand-up and improv, features dozens of unique characters.

== Production ==
Missed Connections was first staged at the Producers Club in New York City on April 29 and 30, 2011. In the audience for one of the performances was Dean Roth of Royanth Productions. Between 2011 and 2013, Roth produced the show at UglyRhino, the Magnet Theater, FRIGID New York and the Laurie Beechman Theatre. In 2013 and 2014, Dunlop produced and continued to curate the show at the Vlada Lounge (a.k.a. InFuse51) until the venue closed. The show returned September 6, 2016, playing at the Kraine Theater in downtown NYC. In 2018 and 2019, shortened versions of the show were performed at The Red Room.

== Notable collaborators ==
The original core cast included Jennifer Anderson, Ricky Dunlop, Jake McKenna and Lauren Roth. In 2012, Dunlop became the show's announcer and Tom Lapke briefly joined the team as creative director. In late 2013, Lauren Roth departed, while a guest performance by Michael Lorz lead to him becoming a core cast member. Other notable guest stars include comedy legend Gilbert Gottfried, Yuhua Hamasaki, George Salazar, Julia Mattison, Juson Williams, Jen Ponton and Jared Zirilli.
