= Journal of Postcolonial Writing =

- Discipline: English language, English literature
- Language: English
- Edited by: Janet Wilson

Publication details
- Former name(s): World Literature Written in English
- History: 1973-present
- Publisher: Routledge
- Frequency: 6/year

Standard abbreviations
- ISO 4: J. Postcolon. Writ.

Indexing
- ISSN: 1744-9855 (print); 1744-9863 (web)
- LCCN: 2005234723
- OCLC no.: 300873825

Links
- Journal homepage; Online access; Online archive

The Journal of Postcolonial Writing (from 1973 to 2004 titled World Literature Written in English) is a peer-reviewed academic journal publishing work that examines the interface between the economic forces commodifying culture and postcolonial writing of the modern era. The journal also includes interviews and biographies of postcolonial academics and authors, short prose fiction, poetry, and book reviews.

== Abstracting and indexing ==
The journal is indexed by the American Humanities Index, the MLA International Bibliography, The Journal of Commonwealth Literature, and in AustLit: The Australian Literature Resource. The journal is a member of The Council of Editors of Learned Journals.
