= Louis Armand (writer) =

Writer, visual artist, and critical theorist (born 1972)

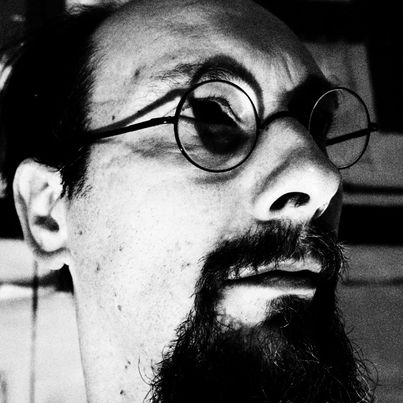
Louis Armand

Louis Armand (born 1972, Sydney) is a writer, visual artist, and critical theorist. He has lived in Prague since 1994.

He has published ten novels, including Vampyr (2020), GlassHouse (2018), The Combinations (2016; shortlisted for The Guardian's Not the Booker Prize), Cairo (2014; longlisted for the Dublin IMPAC Award), and Breakfast at Midnight (2012). In addition, he is the author of numerous collections of poetry – most recently, Monument (with John Kinsella, 2020), East Broadway Rundown (2015) The Rube Goldberg Variations (2015), & Synopticon (with John Kinsella, 2012). He has also authored a number of volumes of criticism, including Videology (2015) & The Organ-Grinder's Monkey: Culture after the Avantgarde (2013). His poetry has appeared in the anthologies Thirty Australian Poets, The Best Australian Poems, Calyx: 30 Contemporary Australian Poets & The Penguin Anthology of Australian Poetry.

In 1997 he received the Max Harris prize for poetry at the Penola Festival (Adelaide) and in 2000 he was awarded the Nassau Review Prize (New York). His screenplay Clair Obscur won honourable mention at the 2009 Trieste Film Festival.< In 2004, Armand founded the Prague International Poetry Festival, and since 2009 has co-organised the Prague Microfestival.

He is a member of the editorial board of Rhizomes: Studies in Cultural Knowledge and founding editor (1994) of the online journal HJS (Hypermedia Joyce Studies). He is the founding editor of VLAK Magazine, and directs the Centre for Critical & Cultural Theory at Charles University, Prague.

== Works ==
Armand's poems have appeared in Meanjin, Agenda, The Age, Stand, Poetry Review, Verse and Sulfur, as well as The Penguin Anthology of Australian Poetry (ed. John Kinsella 2008), Calyx: 30 Contemporary Australian Poets (eds. Michael Brennan and Peter Minter, 2000), and The Best Australian Poems (ed. Peter Rose, 2008). He is author of five volumes of poetry and a number of chapbooks including: Land Partition (2001), Inexorable Weather (2001), Malice in Underland (2003), and Strange Attractors (2003). The Garden, a work of experimental fiction was published in 2001.

Armand's novels include Clair Obscur (2011); Breakfast at Midnight (2012), critically acclaimed and described by critics as a “twisted, brilliantly savage acid noir” and a “wonderfully executed nod to Kafka's special brand of disorienting surrealism”; Canicule (2013); Cairo (2014), which was shortlisted for the Guardian's Not the Booker Prize, Abacus (Vagabond, 2015), The Combinations (2016), shortlisted for the Guardian's Not the Booker Prize and praised as "an important and corrosive novel, which is a commitment to creativity in the face of absurdity, a politics of avant garde literary concentration and experience”, and most recently, Vampyr (2020) and The Garden: Director's Cut (2020).

In 2013, Breakfast at Midnight was translated into Czech by David Vichnar and published by Argo Press.

Armand's critical and theoretical work has been published in journals such as CTheory, Triquarterly and Culture Machine. His most recent books include Videology, vols. 1 & 2 (2015, 2017), Helixtrolysis: Cyberology & the Joycean “Tyrondynamon Machine” (2014), The Organ Grinder's Monkey (2013), Solicitations: Essays on Criticism & Culture (2008), Event States: Discourse, Time, Mediality (2007) and Contemporary Poetics (2007).

== Publications ==
=== Poetry ===
Seances. Prague: Twisted Spoon Press, 1998.

The Viconian Paramour. New York: x-poezie, 1998.

Erosions. Sydney: Vagabond Press, 1999. (chapbook)

Anatomy Lessons. New York: x-poezie, 1999. (chapbook)

Land Partition. Melbourne: Textbase Publications, 2001.

Base Materialism. New York: x-poezie, 2001. (chapbook)

Inexorable Weather Todmorden, Lancs. (UK): Arc Publications, 2001.

Malice in Underland Melbourne: Textbase, 2003.

Strange Attractors Cambridge: Salt Publications, 2003.

Picture Primitive NY: Antigen, 2006.

Letters from Ausland Sydney: Vagabond, 2011.

Synopticon (with John Kinsella) (Prague: Litteraria, 2012)

Indirect Objects (Sydney: Vagabond, 2014)

Rube Goldberg Variations (Prague: Vlak Records, 2015)

East Broadway Rundown (Prague: Vlak Records, 2015)

Monument (with John Kinsella; London: Hesterglock Press, 2020)

A House for Hanne Darboven. Libretto, 2021.

Descartes’ Dog. Chapbook, 2021.

VITUS. ΜΕΓΆΦΩΝΟ, 2022.

DI/ODE. Prague: IAC, 2023.

Infantilisms. Melbourne: Puncher & Wattmann, 2024.

=== Fiction ===
The Garden (Cambridge: Salt, 2001) The Garden

Menudo (New York: Antigen, 2006) Menudo

Clair Obscur (London: Equus, 2011)

Breakfast at Midnight (London: Equus, 2012)

Canicule (London: Equus, 2013)

Snídaně o půlnoci (trans. David Vichnar; Prague: Argo, 2013)

Cairo (London: Equus, 2014)

Abacus (Sydney: Vagabond Press, 2015)

The Combinations (London: Equus, 2016)

GlassHouse (London: Equus, 2018)

Gagarin (Always Crashing 3, 2020)

The Garden (Director's Cut) (Minneapolis: 11:11, 2020)

Vampyr (Alienist, 2020)

Hotel Palenque (Minor Literatures, 2021)

Glitchhead. Miskatonic Virtual University Press, 2021.

Vampyr / Glitchhead (deluxe edition). Equus Press, 2023.

ANIZAR. London: Equus Press, 2024.

A Tomb in H-Section. London: Equus Press, 2025.

=== Theory ===
Night Joyce of a Thousand Tiers. Petr Škrabánek: Studies in Finnegans Wake Eds. Louis Armand & Ondrej Pilny. Prague: Litteraria Pragensia Books, 2002.

Techne: James Joyce, Hypertext & Technology Prague: Karolinum Press/Charles University Press, 2003.

JoyceMedia: James Joyce, Genetics and Hypermedia Ed. Louis Armand. Prague: Litteraria Pragensia Books, 2004.

Mind Factory Ed. Louis Armand. Prague: Litteraria Pragensia Books, 2005.

Giacomo Joyce: Envoys of the Other Eds. Louis Armand & Clare Wallace. Prague: Litteraria Pragensia Books, 2006. (2nd edition)

Technicity Eds. Louis Armand & Arthur Bradley. Prague: Litteraria Pragensia Books, 2006.

Incendiary Devices: Discourses of the Other Prague: Karolinum Press, 2006.

Literate Technologies: Language, Cognition, Technicity Prague: Litteraria Pragensia Books, 2006.

Avant-Post Ed. Louis Armand. Prague: Litteraria Pragensia Books, 2006.

Event States: Discourse, Time, Mediality Prague: Litteraria Pragensia Books, 2007.

Poetics Ed. Louis Armand. Evanston: Northwestern University Press, 2007.

Language Systems: After Prague Structuralism Ed. Louis Armand with Pavel Černovský. Prague: Litteraria Pragensia Books, 2007.

Solicitations: Essays on Criticism & Culture (First edition 2005) Expanded and revised edition, Prague: Litteraria Pragensia Books, 2008.

Hidden Agendas Unreported Poetics Ed. Louis Armand. Prague: Litteraria Pragensia Books, 2010.

Hypermedia Joyce Eds. David Vichnar & Louis Armand. Prague: Litteraria Pragensia Books, 2010.

The Return of Kral Majales Prague's International Literary Renaissance 1990–2010 An Anthology Ed. Louis Armand. Prague: Litteraria Pragensia Books, 2010.

The Organ-Grinder's Monkey Prague: Litteraria Pragensia Books, 2013.

Helixtrolysis / Cyberology & the Joycean “Tyrondynamon Machine” Prague: Litteraria Pragensia Books, 2014.

Videology Prague: Litteraria Pragensia Books, 2015.

Videology 2 Prague: Litteraria Pragensia Books, 2017.

Festins de Desmando, trans. Jorge Pereirinha Pires, ill. Siegmar Fricke. Lisboa: Barco Bêbado, 2023.

Entropology. Grand Rapids MI: Anti-Oedipus Press, 2023.

Feasts of Unrule. Prague: Litteraria Pragensia, 2024.

Homo Catastrophicus. Sheffield: Erratum, 2024.

=== Exhibitions ===
Galerie Artnatur (1999) Solo

Galerie Gambit (2002) Solo

Southern: 10 Contemporary Australian Artists, Home Gallery (2004) co-curator

Art Prague (2006)

Hunger Gallery (2010) Solo
