= Thomas Kilroy =

Irish playwright and novelist (1934–2023)

Thomas F. Kilroy (23 September 1934 – 7 December 2023) was an Irish playwright and novelist.

== Biography ==
Thomas F. Kilroy was born in Callan, County Kilkenny. He attended St Kieran's College and played hurling for the school team, captaining the senior team in 1952. He studied at University College Dublin. In his early career he was play editor at the Abbey Theatre, Dublin. In the 1980s, he sat on the board of Field Day Theatre Company, founded by Brian Friel and Stephen Rea in 1980, and was Director of its touring company.

In 1978, Kilroy was appointed Professor of English at University College Galway, a post from which he resigned in 1989 to concentrate on writing.

Kilroy lived in County Mayo and was a member of the Irish Academy of Letters, the Royal Society of Literature, and Aosdána.

The Thomas Kilroy Collection, his archive, was deposited at Galway University's James Hardiman Library; Kilroy addressed the launch event in March 2011, which was attended by, amongst others, Brian Friel and the future President of Ireland Michael D. Higgins.

Kilroy died on 7 December 2023, at the age of 89.

== Plays ==
- The Death and Resurrection of Mr Roche, The Dublin Theatre Festival, 1968. Published by Faber & Faber, Grove Press, 1968;
- The O'Neill, The Peacock Theatre, Dublin, 1969. Published by The Gallery Press, Oldcastle, Co Meath, 1995;
- Talbot's Box, The Peacock, 1973. Published by The Gallery Press/Delaware, Proscenium Press, 1979;
- Sex and Shakespheare, The Abbey, 1976. Revised edition published by The Gallery Press, 1998;
- Double Cross, Field Day Theatre Company, 1986. Published by Faber & Faber, 1986. Translated into French as Double jeu by Alexandra Poulain, 1996;
- The Madame MacAdam Travelling Theatre, The Field Day Theatre Company, 1992. Published by Methuen, 1992;
- The Secret Fall of Constance Wilde, The Abbey, 1997 and Melbourne Festival 1998. Published by The Gallery Press, 1997;
- Blake, 2001. Published by The Gallery Press, 2015;
- The Shape of Metal, The Peacock, 2003. Published by The Gallery Press;
- My Scandalous Life, 2004. Published by The Gallery Press;
- Christ Deliver Us!, 2010, Abbey Theatre.

== Adaptations ==
- The Seagull (Chekhov), The Royal Court, London, 1981. Published by Eyre Methuen, 1981;
- Ghosts (Ibsen), The Peacock Theatre, Dublin, 1989;
- Six Characters in Search of an Author (Pirandello) The Abbey Theatre, Dublin, 1996.

== Books ==
- The Big Chapel, Faber & Faber, 1971; Liberties Press, 2009. This novel was awarded the Guardian Fiction Prize in 1971 and was shortlisted for the Booker Prize.
- Sean O'Casey: a Collection of Critical Essays, Ed., Prentice Hall, 1975, ISBN 0-13-628941-X

== Pieces for Radio ==
- The Door, BBC Radio 4, 27 October 1967;
- That Man Bracken, BBC Radio 3, 20 June 1986;
- The Colleen and the Cowboy, RTÉ Radio, Prod. Kate Minogue, 11 September 2005.

== Pieces for Television ==
- Farmers, Radio Telefís Éireann, 1978;
- Gold in the Streets, 1993;
- The Black Joker.

== Academic Works ==
- Satirical elements in the prose of Thomas Nashe. Thesis (M.A.), University College Dublin, 1959.
- Kilroy, Thomas (1958). "Mervyn Wall: The Demands of Satire". Studies: An Irish Quarterly Review. 47 (185): 83–89. JSTOR 30098954.
- Kilroy, Thomas (1959). "Groundwork for an Irish Theatre". Studies: An Irish Quarterly Review. 48 (190): 192–198. JSTOR 30103597.
- Kilroy, Thomas (1967). "Reading and Teaching the Novel". Studies: An Irish Quarterly Review. 56 (224): 356–367. JSTOR 30087248.
- The Outsider., The Irish Times 16 April 1971.
- Synge and Modernism., in J. M. Synge Centenary Papers. 1971. Ed. Maurice Harmon. Dublin. Dolmen Press, 1972. 167–79.
- Synge the Dramatist., Mosaic 5.1 (1972): 9–16.
- Tellers of Tales., Times Literary Supplement. 17 March 1972: 301–02.
- The Writer’s Group in Galway., The Irish Times. 8 April 1976.
- Two Playwrights: Yeats and Beckett., Myth and Reality in Irish Literature. Ed. Joseph Ronsley. Toronto: Wilfrid Laurier University Press, 1977. 183–95.
- Kilroy, Thomas (1979). "Anglo-Irish Playwrights and Comic Tradition". The Crane Bag. 3 (2): 19–27. JSTOR 30059621.
- The Moon and the Yellow River : Denis Johnson’s Shavianism., Denis Johnson : A Retrospective. Joseph Ronsley Ed. Irish Literary Studies 8. Gerrards Cross, Bucks : Colin Smythe, 1981; Totawa, New Jersey : Barnes and Noble, 1982. 49 – 58.
- The Irish Writer: Self and Society, 1950–1980., Literature and the Changing Ireland. Irish Literary Studies 9. Ed. Peter Connolly. Gerrards Cross: Colin Smythe, 1982. 175–87.
- The Anglo-Irish., The Irish Times. 7 December 1983.
- Goldsmith the Playwright., Goldsmith, the Gentle Master. Ed. Sean Lucy. Cork: Cork University Press, 1984. 66–77.
- Brecht, Beckett, and Williams., Sagetrieb 3.2 (Fall 1984): 81–87.
- The Autobiographical Novel., The Genius of Irish Prose. Augustine Martin Ed. Thomas Davis Lecture Series. Dublin : Mercier Press in collaboration with Radio Telefís Éireann, 1985. 65–75.
- Ireland’s Pseudo-Englishman. , Magill 11.5 January 1988 : 52–54.
- Reassessment. Thomas Kilroy on J.M. Synge : The Complex Creator of a Closed World., The Irish Times 29 April 1989.
- Secularized Ireland., Culture in Ireland : Division and Diversity ? Proceedings of the Cultures of Ireland Group Conference, 27–28 September 1991. Ed. Edna Longley. Belfast : Institute of Irish Studies, Queen's University Belfast, 1991. 135 – 141.
- Kilroy, Thomas (1992). "A Generation of Playwright". Irish University Review. 22 (1): 135–141. JSTOR 25484471.
- Theatrical Text and Literary Text., The Achievement of Brian Friel. Ed. Alan J. Peacock. Gerrard's Cross: Bucks, Colin Smythe, 1993. 91–102.
- Some Irish Poems of Yeats,, Eibei-Bungaku. Koka Women's University, 11.3 (March 1994) : 41 – 53.
- The Literary Tradition of Irish Drama., Anglistentag 1994 graz : Proceedings. W. Rioehle, H. Keiper edc. Tübingen : Niemeyer, 1995. 7 – 15.
- John Bull’s Other Island : Shaw’s Irish Play. , Banado Sho Kenkyu. Vol. 3, 1995, 11.1 1–20.
- Chekhov and the Irish., Program Note. Chekhov's Uncle Vanya adapt. Frank McGuinness. Field Day Theatre Company. 1995.
- From Page to Stage., Irish Writers and Their Creative Process. Ed. Jacqueline Genet and Wynne Hellegouarc’h. Gerrards Cross: Colin Smythe, 1996. 55–62.
- The Anglo-Irish Theatrical Imagination., Bullan, an Irish Studies journal 3.2 (Winter 1997/ Spring 1998), 5 – 12.
- Kilroy, Thomas (1999). "Friendship". Irish University Review. 29 (1): 83–89. JSTOR 25511532.
- The Seagull, an Adaptation., The Cambridge Companion to Chekhov. Ed. Vera Gottlieg and Paul Allain. Cambridge: Cambridge University Press, 2000. 80–90.
- The Wildean Triangle., What Revels Are in Hand ? Assessment of Contemporary Drama in English in Honor of W. Lippke. B. Reitz, H. Stahl, eds.
- Contemporary Drama in English., (CDE Studies) 8 Trier : WVT Wissenschaftlicher Verlag, 2001. 47 – 55.

== Unpublished ==
- Dreaming House, a Play about George Moore, 1990.

== Works about Thomas Kilroy ==
- Le théâtre de Thomas Kilroy., Thierry Dubost, Presses Universitaires de Caen, 2001, English edition The Plays of Thomas Kilroy: A Critical Study, McFarland, 2007
- "Irish University Review 32:1 Special Issue Thomas Kilroy". JSTOR i25517170.
- O'Malley, Aidan. Field Day and the Translation of Irish Identities: Performing Contradictions. Basingstoke and New York: Palgrave Macmillan, 2011. (Sections on Double Cross and The Madame MacAdam Travelling Theatre)

== Awards and honours ==
- Guardian Fiction Prize, 1971;
- Fellow of the Royal Society of Literature, 1972;
- Heinemann Award for Literature;
- AIB Literary Prize;
- American-Irish Foundation Award for Literature;
- Rockefeller Foundation Residency;
- Kyoto University Foundation Fellowship;
- Prix Nikki Special Commendation;
- Lifetime Achievement, Irish Times / ESB Theatre Award, 2004;
- 2008 Irish PEN Award;
- Honorary Fellow of Trinity College Dublin 2011
