= Caribbean folklore =

Caribbean folklore includes a mix of traditions, tales, and beliefs of the Caribbean region. Caribbean folklore was shaped by a history filled with violence, colonialism, slavery, and multicultural influences. Specifically, influences from African, Creole, Asian, Indigenous American, European, and Indian cultures converged in the Caribbean to create a blend of lore unique to the region. Caribbean folklore has a variety of different characters that portray different traits. Folklore has evolved by blending folk speech, Creole dialogue, and various other elements that create the literary form of folklore, which portrays the "spirit" and "soul" of the Caribbean. Many themes are covered in Caribbean folklore, including colonial legacies, diversity in cultures, and the search for identity. Writers such as Nalo Hopkinson use these folklore elements in their writings by weaving myths and traditions into their modern-day storytelling.

== Background ==
Folklore is a cultural body of traditional customs, sayings, dances, tales, or art forms that are preserved among a group of people. Different groups have different tales and stories of their people.

In Caribbean folklore, different characters have remained consistent throughout time through both oral and written stories, such as the "Ananse" and "Papa Bois". Over the past 80 years, the use of folk speech and Creole dialogue include other folklore materials and the use of folk speech in the narrative voice has evolved.

Folklore has served as a vulcanizing agent to create a new form of literature that is unique to the Caribbean, a literature that includes the soul and spirit of a region and its people. Many Caribbean societies have a history of colonialism, slavery, outside influences, and the struggles for independence. These issues have shaped Caribbean folklore's representation in Caribbean children's literature. The Caribbean region has a history of violent imperial domination, which contrasts with its Edenic setting. This history involves the extermination of Native Americans, the African slave trade, and the arrival of indentured servants from China and East India. This diverse mix of cultures, languages, and traditions contributes to Caribbean folklore.

Because of the region's history with the African slave trade, Caribbean folklore is intrinsically linked with African folklore. Many of the tales, songs, proverbs, riddles, and superstitions that are found on the islands of the Caribbean can be directly traced back to Africa. Religious ideas and rituals brought over from Africa have inspired new variations to emerge. In certain situations, it has become necessary for those who practice these variations to come together and decide the appropriateness of their rituals.

The Caribbean's unique geopolitical features and multicultural landscape inspire artists and writers to navigate multiple identities while maintaining a vibrant regional aesthetic in their works. This multicultural identity is an ongoing theme in Caribbean literature and folklore, exploring the dynamics between colonial legacies, cultural diversity, and the quest for individual and collective identity. Caribbean literature and folklore is often classified by language (English, Dutch, Spanish, and French). When depicting Creole culture in language, it is often from the perspective of an outsider looking into the life of indigenous people and witnessing the cultural differences. Oral traditions, including Anancy stories and folklore, influenced the storytelling style in Caribbean culture.

== Characters ==
Popular throughout the Caribbean region are the Anancy Stories (also known as Nancy Stories), which have their roots in West Africa. Ananse is the Asante word for spider. The trickster Anancy (also known as Ananci, Ananse, Anansi, Ananci Krokoko, and Brer Nancy), with his quick-witted intelligence and his knack for surviving the odds, often through trickery, is popular in this genre of African-Caribbean folk-tale characters, although there are other West African influences in folklore characters, including the hare and tortoise, which appear separately or together in folktales from both Yoruba and Ibo peoples.

In addition to these stories, African religious figures also form a notable part of Caribbean folklore. Many of the supernatural folklore figures have characteristics identical to those of African deities and include the following.

"Papa Bois" appears in many forms, sometimes as a deer, sometimes in old ragged clothes, sometimes hairy and though very old, strong and muscular, with cloven hoofs and leaves growing out of his beard. As the guardian of the animals and the custodian of the trees, he is known to sound a cow's horn to warn his friends of the approach of hunters. He does not tolerate killing for killing's sake, or the wanton destruction of the forest.

"Mama D'Leau"

"Madre de aguas"

"La Diablesse", the devil woman, is sometimes personified as an old crone, who steps forth with her cloven hoof from behind a tree on a lonely road, the sound of chains mingling with the rustle of her petticoat. Sometimes, she takes the form of a beautiful woman to lure some unsuspecting passerby to his death or perhaps to madness. Although she may appear young, she will be dressed in the traditional costume of these islands: a madras turban, chemise with half-sleeves and much embroidery and lace, zepingue tremblant ("trembling pins of gold"), and all the finery of by-gone days. Even when she appears beautiful, there is something that betrays her – she often has one hoof and a normal human foot or two hooves that she uses her long, flowing gown to hide.

"Mama Dlo" or "Mama Dglo" (known in West Africa today as Mammy Wata) is akin to the mermaid figure of European folklore and represents West African water spirits. Her name is derived from the French maman de l'eau, which means "mother of the water". According to the lore, she abducts travelers and pulls them deep into the water. Should she choose to return the travelers to land, they'll be wealthier and more attractive than they were before.

The "Soucouyant," whose French-derived name comes from the word "to suck", is personified by an older woman. It is told that she sheds her skin at night and flies through the skies, sometimes as a ball of flame, to suck blood from her victims.

The "Ligahoo" or "Loup Garou" is a shape-changer, a man who has power over nature and the capacity to change form to that of an animal. In Caribbean Myths, the Loup-Garou is a man who made a deal with the devil to have the ability to change form (to a werewolf) so that at night, he could go around killing without ever being caught.

== Notable storytellers ==
=== Roy Heath ===
Roy Heath was a Guyanese author who wrote novels based on stories from Afro-Guyanese and Amerindian folklore. Some of the themes his novels explored include doom, dreams, and the use of masks, all motifs in Caribbean folklore. Many of his works also reflect the interconnections between oral and written folklore in African and African-Caribbean traditions. His notable novels include The Murderer (1978), Kwaku; or the Man Who Could Not Keep His Mouth Shut (1982), Orealla (1984), and The Shadow Bride (1988).

=== Grace Hallworth ===
Grace Hallworth is a storyteller from Trinidad and Tobago, whose notable works include Stories to Read and Tell (1973), The Carnival Kite (1980), Mouth Open and Story Jump Out (1984). She retells traditional Caribbean tales, preserving and revitalizing Caribbean narratives.

=== Dionne Brand ===
Dionne Brand is a writer and political activist from Trinidad and Tobago. Her writings cover Caribbean cultures, addressing themes of race, history, memory, gender, and sexuality. Brand is known for her poetry collections Earth Magic (1979) and A Caribbean Dozen (1994). These works offer a unique perspective on the essence of childhood within Caribbean culture.

=== Nalo Hopkinson ===
Nalo Hopkinson is a writer from Jamaica who weaves Caribbean folklore into her stories. Her works usually include Afro-Caribbean myths, traditions, and language. Characters in her novels, such as Brown Girl in the Ring (1998) and Midnight Robber (2000), engage with spirits from Caribbean folklore. She uses motifs, rituals, and belief systems in her plots.

== Bibliography and further reading ==
- Abrahams, Roger D. (1985). African American Folktales: Stories from Black Traditions in the New World. Penguin.
- Elswit, Sharon Barcan (2017). The Caribbean Story Finder: A Guide to 438 Tales from 24 Nations and Territories, Listing Subjects and Sources. McFarland & Company, Inc.
- Wolkstein, Diane (1997). The Magic Orange Tree: and Other Haitian Folktales. Penguin Random House.

== See also ==
- Tezin Nan Dlo
- Folklore of Antigua and Barbuda
