= Papa Bois =

Caribbean folklore character

Papa Bois or Papa Bwa (otherwise known as "Maître Bois", meaning master of the woods or "Daddy Bouchon" meaning hairy man), a French patois word for "father wood" or "father of the forest" is a popular fictional folklore character of St. Lucia, Dominica, Grenada and Trinidad and Tobago. Often called the "keeper of the forest", he is thought of as the protector of the forests and their flora and fauna.

He is married to the Mama Dlo also known as Mama D'Leau or Mama Glo.

His appearance is thought to be that of a short, old man of African descent with cloven hooves (or at least his left leg ends in a large hoof) and a beard of leaves, who, despite his age sports strong muscles and can run faster than a deer. His body is completely covered with hair like that of a donkey and small horns sprout from his forehead. He is also known to carry a hollowed-out bull's horn, which he uses to warn animals of hunters' approach. He is also known to have the power of metamorphosis and is commonly thought to transform himself into a deer, luring hunters deep into the forest and getting them lost, much like his female counterpart, Mama Dlo.

It is believed that if one meets Papa Bois, one must be polite and refrain from staring at his hooves, and say a polite greeting to him. For example, "Bon jour, vieux Papa" meaning, "Good day, old father." He is usually represented as a huge Manicou (Opossum). Hunters of the forest are always afraid of him because of his appearing and disappearing trick.

== In popular culture ==
- In Nalo Hopkinson's book Midnight Robber, Papa Bois is the name of the large "daddy trees" that function as both shelter and ecosystem for sentient creatures.

== See also ==
- Douen
- La Diablesse
- Mama D'Leau
- Gang Gang Sarah
- Soucouyant
