= Yara =

Yara may refer to:

== People ==
- Yara (given name)
- Yara (surname), a Japanese surname
- Yara (Brazilian footballer), Yara Silva (born 1964)
- Yara (singer), Lebanese pop singer Carla Nazih al-Berkashi (born 1983)

== Locations ==
- Yara, Cuba, a town and municipality in Granma province
- Yara, a rural village in Elb Adress, Trarza Region, Mauritania
- Yara, a fictional Caribbean island country that serves as the location for the first-person shooter Far Cry 6

== Mythology and religion ==
- Yara (mythology), a figure in Brazilian mythology
- María Lionza, a goddess in a religious movement in Venezuela, sometimes called Yara

== Film and television ==
- Yara (TV series), a 1979 Mexican television series
- The Wound (1998 film), a Turkish feature film originally titled Yara
- Yara, a 2018 Lebanese feature film a 2018 feature film written and directed by Abbas Fahdel
- Yara (2021 film), an Italian feature film

== Other ==
- YARA, a malware research tool
- Yara (beetle), a genus of beetles
- Yara International, a Norwegian chemical company
- Yara International School, a private school in Riyadh, Saudi Arabia
- YARA, ICAO airport code for Ararat Airport, Victoria, Australia
- Yara, an evil character in The Tower of the Elephant by Robert E. Howard
- Yara (ship), a cargo and passenger ship

== See also ==
- Yaara, a 2020 Indian crime action film by Tigmanshu Dhulia
- Yarra (disambiguation)
