= Mama D'Leau =

Caribbean folklore character

Mama D'Leau (derived from the French Maman de l'eau or "Mother of the River"), also known as Mama Dlo and Mama Glo, is the protector and healer of all river animals, according to the folklore of islands such as Saint Lucia, Trinidad and Tobago and Dominica. She is usually depicted as a beautiful woman with long hair, who sits on upper body and arms and from her waist downwards twists into coils. Her tongue becomes forked and she holds a golden comb which she passes through her snaky hair.

== See also ==
- Iara (mythology)
- Madre de aguas
- Mami Wata
- Papa Bois
