= Tlahuelpuchi =

Mythical Mexican vampire

The Tlahuelpuchi is a legendary vampiric witch in folklore from the Mexican state of Tlaxcala, with deep roots amongst the indigenous Nahua culture of the region.

== Etymology ==
The word tlahuelpuchi derives from the Nahuatl tlāhuihpochtli (plural tlātlāhuihpochtin), a compound of tlāhuia, "to light up or illuminate" and pōchtli, which can mean "haze", "left", "southern" or "youth" (as in compounds like tēlpōchtli, young man). As a result, tlahuelpuchi may mean glowing haze or illuminated youth.

== Description ==
The tlahuelpuchi is a type of vampire or witch that lives with its human family. It is able to shape shift and sucks the blood of infants at night. It has a kind of glowing aura when shape shifted. Tlahuelpuchi are born with their curse and cannot avoid it. They first learn of what they are sometime around puberty. Most tlahuelpuchi are female and the female tlahuelpuchi are more powerful than males. The tlahuelpuchi have a form of society. Typically they each have their own territories. They also have a pact with shamans and other supernatural creatures; a shaman won't turn in a suspected tlahuelpuchi. The typical sign that a victim was killed by the tlahuelpuchi are bruises on their upper body. The Tlahuelpuchi largely feeds on children, though it can kill others.

== Powers ==
Tlahuelpuchi are able to change form by detaching their body from their legs (which are left in the house of the witch). They then go hunting, usually in the form of some bird like a turkey or a vulture. The tlahuelpuchi has to perform a ritual before she can enter the house of a victim. The tlahuelpuchi must fly over the house in the shape of a cross from north to south, east to west.

== Weaknesses ==
Tlahuelpuchi must feast on blood at least once a month or they die. Their victim of choice is an infant. There is no way to detect a tlahuelpuchi except by catching them in the act. Their family protects them out of shame and because if a family member is responsible for the death of a tlahuelpuchi the curse will be passed down to them. The curse cannot be lifted, and if a tlahuelpuchi is identified, they must be killed on the spot. Garlic, onions and metal repel the tlahuelpuchi.

== See also ==
- Abyzou
- Chonchon
- Huay Chivo
- Lamashtu
- Lamia
- Lilin
- Nagual
- Shtriga
- Skin-walker
- Soucouyant
- Krasue
- Manananggal
- Penanggalan
- Vampire
- Chupacabra
