= Yara (given name) =

Yara (or Iara) is a given name developed independently in the Arabic and Tupi languages, and also the anglicized spelling of a number of unrelated given names.

- Arabic Yara (يارا) meaning small butterfly
- Brazilian Portuguese Iara, a river spirit in Tupi and Guarani mythology
- Persian Yārā يارا (يارا) meaning "strength" or "courage". The dictionary definition of يارا at Wiktionary
- Biblical Yaʿrah (יַעֲרָה) in the Masoretic Text of 1 Chronicles 9:42 is a variant of יַעֲרָה yaʿărâh "forested", used as a masculine given name of a descendant of Saul (son of Micah, great-grandson of Mephibosheth).

In the 1990s, Yara (without identifiable etymology or ethnic connection) began to become popular as a girl's name in Western countries.

Notable people with the name include:

- Yara (singer) (born 1983), Lebanese singer
- Yara Amaral (1936–1988), Brazilian actress
- Yara Bernette (1920–2002), Brazilian classical pianist
- Yara Cortes (1921–2002), Brazilian actress
- Yara Dufren, real life contestant on 90 Day Fiancé in Season 6 (2020–21), husband of Jovi Dufren (m.2020)
- Yara El Khalil (born 1981) University Professor, academic researcher and published scholar
- Yara El-Ghadban (born 1976), Palestinian-Canadian novelist
- Yara Gambirasio (1997–2010), Italian murder victim
- Yara Goubran (born 1982), Egyptian actress
- Yara Greyjoy, character in the Game of Thrones HBO series, based on the "A Song of Ice and Fire" books by George R.R. Martin
- Yara Kastelijn (born 1997), Dutch racing cyclist
- Yara van Kerkhof (born 1990), Dutch skater
- Yara Lasanta (born 1986), Puerto Rican model
- Yara Martinez (born 1979), American actress
- Yara Bou Rada (born 2000), Lebanese footballer
- Yara Sallam (born 1985), Egyptian human-rights activist
- Yara dos Santos (born 1979), Cape Verdean writer
- Yara Shahidi (born 2000), American actress
- Yara Silva (born 1964), Brazilian footballer
- Yara Sofia (born 1984), Puerto Rican entertainer
- Yara Tupinambá (born 1932), Brazilian artist
- Yara Yavelberg (1943–1971), Brazilian psychologist

== See also ==
- Yusaku Yara (born 1948), Japanese actor
- Yara (disambiguation)
