= Sharon Lewis =

Canadian TV personality and film director

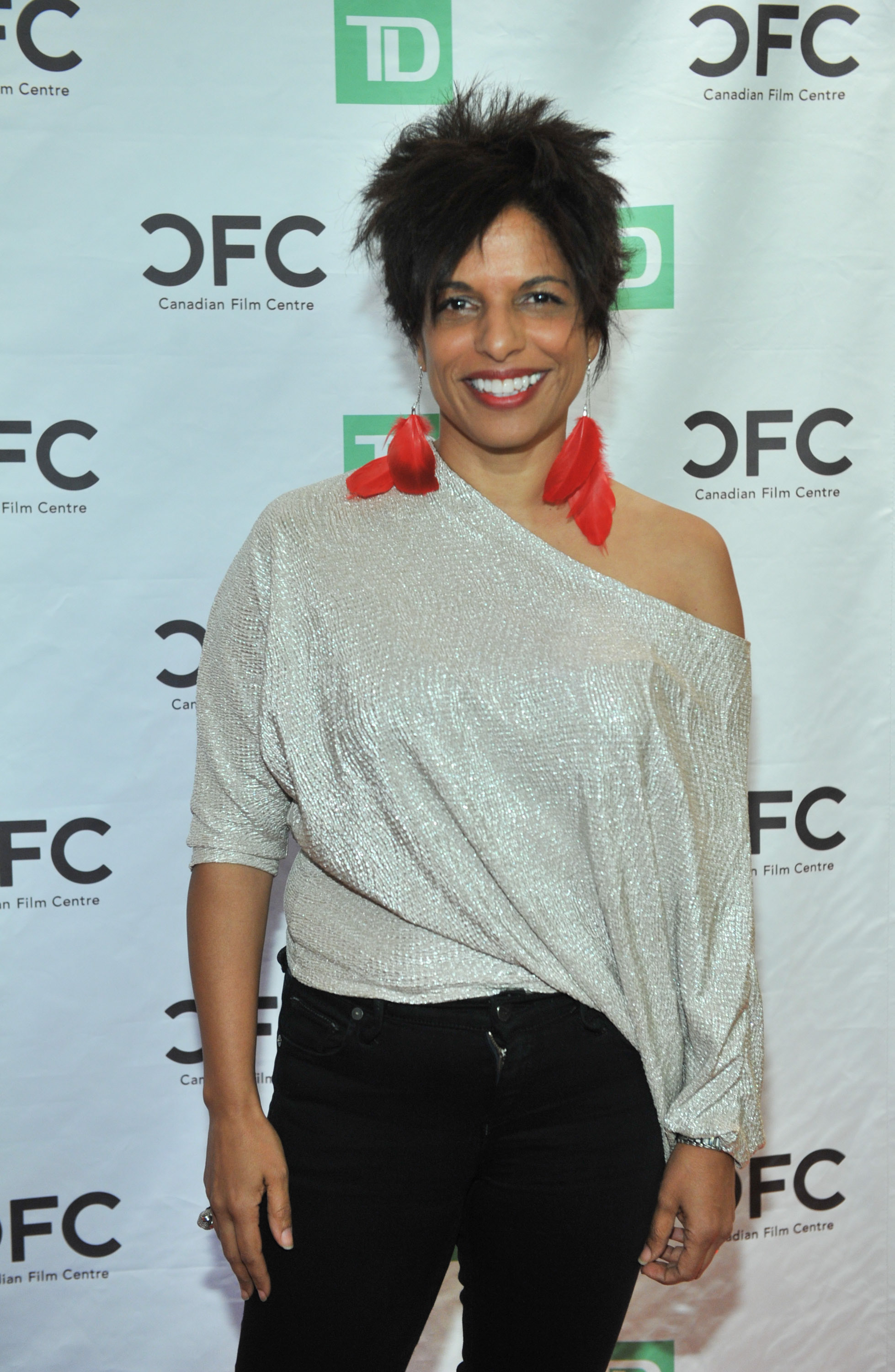
- Lewis at the Black History Month event "An Evening with Pam Grier" in 2011
- Born: Sharon M. Lewis; Toronto, Ontario, Canada
- Education: University of Toronto (BA)
- Occupations: Director; screenwriter; actor
- Years active: 1995–present

Sharon M. Lewis is a Canadian television personality, actress, writer and director from Toronto, Ontario. She studied political science at the University of Toronto.

She began her career in theatre, collaborating with Maxine Bailey on the play Sistahs in 1994. The two subsequently launched their own theatre company, Sugar & Spice Productions.

She continued to work as an actress and author before becoming the host of counterSpin on CBC Television in 2001, and then hosted ZeD, also for the Canadian Broadcasting Corporation. She began her career on counterSpin with a special on the September 11 attacks. She called herself an "activist," saying "it's a journalist's job to activate change through information... Who isn't passionate and is in the journalist field, otherwise I don't know what would drive you?" After leaving ZeD, Ziya Tong took over as host.

Lewis subsequently established the company urbansoul inc., which promotes the art of minority women.

During her acting career, she appeared on Degrassi: The Next Generation as the mother of Jimmy Brooks, who was played by rapper Drake. She also appeared in the film Troubled Waters.

In 2017, Lewis directed her Afro-futurist feature film Brown Girl Begins, a feature film prequel to the celebrated novel Brown Girl in the Ring by Nalo Hopkinson.

In 2024, she directed the mid-season premiere of Power Book II: Ghost, from the Power franchise.

Lewis is a member of Film Fatales.

== Filmography ==
=== Filmmaker ===
Year	Title	Director	Writer	Producer
2006	Ritch (Short)	Yes	Yes	No
2009	Chains (Short)	Yes	No	No
2011	In Between Life (Short)	Yes	Yes	Yes
2016	See Me Now (Short)	Yes	No	No
2017	Brown Girl Begins	Yes	Yes	Yes
2019	Disruptor Conductor (Documentary)	Yes	No	No
2020	Merry Liddle Christmas Wedding	Yes	No	No
2021	Murdoch Mysteries	Yes	No	No
2021	With Wonder (Documentary)	Yes	No	No
2022	Hudson & Rex	Yes	No	No
2023	Power Book IV: Force	Yes	No	No
2024	Sight Unseen	Yes	No	No
2024	Chicago Med	Yes	No	No
2024	Power Book II: Ghost	Yes	No	No
2024	Star Trek: Strange New Worlds	Yes	No	No
2024	FBI: Most Wanted	Yes	No	No

=== Actress ===
Year	Title	Role
1999	Lullaby (Short)	Creation Woman (as Sharon M. Lewis)
2001	Maple (Short)	Chamele (as Sharon M. Lewis)
2002	The Style of My Soul (Short)	as Sharon M. Lewis
2014	Happy 1 Year (Short)	Diana
2018	Mouthpiece	Barbara
2019	White Lie	Collette
