= Huay Chivo =

Legendary Maya beast

The Huay Chivo (Spanish pronunciation: [waj ˈtʃiβo]) is a legendary Maya beast. It is a half-man, half-beast creature, with burning red eyes, and is specific to the Yucatán Peninsula. It is reputed to be an evil sorcerer who can transform himself into a supernatural animal, usually a goat, dog or deer, in order to prey upon livestock. In recent times, it has become associated with the chupacabras. The Huay Chivo is specific to Guatemala, the southeastern Mexican states of Yucatán, Campeche and Quintana Roo. Alleged Huay Chivo activity is sporadically reported in the regional press. Local Maya near the town of Valladolid, in Yucatán, believe the Huay Chivo is an evil sorcerer that is capable of transforming into a goat to do mischief and eat livestock.

The Huay Chivo is a local variation of the Mesoamerican Nahual.

== Etymology ==
The name Huay Chivo combines Spanish and Yucatec Mayan terms. Huay or Uay comes from Waay in Yucatec Maya, meaning sorcerer, spirit or animal familiar, while Chivo is Spanish for goat, literally meaning sorcerer-goat; it is also known as the Chivo Brujo, an entirely Spanish phrase meaning the same thing.

== See also ==
- Black dog (ghost)
- Chonchon
- Chupacabra
- Nahual
- Skin-walker
- Soucouyant
- Shapeshifting
- Wayob
- Ijiraq
