= Douen =

Mythological entity from Trinidad and Tobago

The Douen (/ˈduːɪn/) is an entity in Trinidadian folklore, also spelt Dwen (/ˈdwɛn/) in Saint Lucian folklore. Their most recognized characteristic is that their feet are said to be backwards, with the heel facing the front and the knees are backwards also being faceless. If they hear a child's name, then they can call to the child in a parent's voice and try to lure the child into the forest. They wear a big, floppy straw hat to hide the fact that they have no face except for a small mouth to speak with. Largely mischievous, they play pranks on people, raid gardens, and seem to enjoy leading children astray until they are thoroughly lost in the woods.

== Origins ==
The folklore is primarily of African foundation, with French, Spanish, and English influences. Religious or semi-religious cults of African origin have undeniably contributed much to the Island's folklore. Many of the supernatural folklore characters are identical with those of African deities. It is exceedingly complicated to draw a line between the stern religious elements and what may be described as traditions. Nevertheless, in the African tradition, stories were meant to instill values in the children.

Based on the description of Trinidadian Douen/Saint Lucian Dwen, it seems that this folklore may have originated from the Mayan folklore Tata Duende or the Latin-American folklore of duende.

== In popular culture ==
- Douen feature heavily in Lost and Found, a season 4 episode of the Syfy television show Haven.
- Douen are mentioned 12 times in Kareem Abdul-Jabbar & Anna Waterhouse's novel Mycroft Holmes.
- "Douen" is used to describe a sentient species on another planet in Nalo Hopkinson's novel Midnight Robber (Warner Aspect, 2000). The human characters explain that, on foreign planets, douen is used as a threat to frighten children: that these creatures are dead children arisen from the grave.

== See also ==
- Baptism
- Trinidad and Tobago
- Caribbean
- Mami Wata
- Madam Koi Koi
- Papa Bois
- Duende (mythology)
