= Brown Girl in the Ring =

Brown Girl in the Ring may refer to:

- "Brown Girl in the Ring" (song), a traditional children's song in the West Indies, recorded by Boney M and others
- Brown Girl in the Ring (novel), by Nalo Hopkinson, 1998
