= Magui =

Magui or Magüi may refer to:

- Magüí Payán, town and municipality in the Nariño Department, Colombia
- Magüi Serna (born 1979), Spanish tennis player
- Magdalena Aicega (born 1973), nicknamed Magui, Argentine field hockey player
- Madre de aguas, also known as Magüi, mythical creature in the folklore of Cuba
