= Falling in Love With Hominids =

Short story collection by Nalo Hopkinson

- Author: Nalo Hopkinson
- Cover artist: Chuma Hill
- Language: English
- Published: August 2015
- Publisher: Tachyon Publications
- ISBN: 9781616961985

Falling in Love With Hominids is a collection of short stories by Nalo Hopkinson. One of the stories in this collection, "Flying Lessons" is a new story, while other stories had been written and published in the decade proceeding publication of the collection. In the introduction to the collection, Hopkinson explains the double meaning behind its title. Partially derived from a phrase written by science fiction author Cordwainer Smith, "falling in love with hominids" also describes her own feelings about the human race. When she was younger, Hopkinson writes that she hated human beings, but has grown to love and be fascinated by the human race over the intervening years. The paradox of people who are "capable simultaneously of such great good and such horrifying evil" runs throughout the stories brought together in the collection.

This collection includes "The Easthound," a post-apocalyptic tale of humans turning into monsters that are hungry for flesh when they become adults. "Old Habits" tells the story of ghosts residing in a mall, brought together in the place where they died, who relive the moment of their deaths every day. One of the stories in this collection, "Blushing" is adaptation of the French folktale, Bluebeard. Hopkinson has another short story about Bluebeard, "The Glass Bottle Trick', published in Whispers from the Cotton Tree Root.

Hopkinson draws on inspiration from many places for these stories, including classic literature, folklore, and Afro-Caribbean culture. "Shift" retells stories of Caliban and Ariel from The Tempest from Caliban's conflicted point of view, while "Flying Lessons" is about a small girl in Trinidad who draw parallels of her own life to the novella The Little Prince. "Men Sell Not Such in Any Town" is a salute to Goblin Market, a poem by Christina Rossetti.
