= Brown Girl Begins =

- Directed by: Sharon Lewis
- Written by: Sharon Lewis
- Based on: Brown Girl in the Ring by Nalo Hopkinson
- Produced by: Vince Buda; Sharon Lewis; Floyd Kane; Jenn Paul
- Starring: Mouna Traoré; Emmanuel Kabongo; Nigel Shawn Williams; Shakura S'Aida; Rachael Crawford; Measha Brueggergosman
- Cinematography: Marc Forand
- Edited by: Ben Lawrence; Richard Mandin
- Music by: Aaron Ferrera
- Production company: Urbansoul
- Release date: September 23, 2017 (Urbanworld)
- Running time: 95 minutes
- Country: Canada
- Language: English

Brown Girl Begins is a 2017 Canadian science fiction film, directed by Sharon Lewis.

The film was inspired by Nalo Hopkinson's 1998 novel Brown Girl in the Ring, although for budgetary reasons Lewis opted to write and film a prequel story rather than literally adapting the novel itself.

== Plot ==
Set in a post-apocalyptic version of Toronto in 2049, the film focuses on a small group of survivors whose continued survival depends on Ti-Jeanne's (Mouna Traoré) response to a potentially life-altering decision.

== Cast ==
Alongside Traoré, the cast also includes Emmanuel Kabongo, Nigel Shawn Williams, Shakura S'Aida, Rachael Crawford, Andy McQueen and Measha Brueggergosman.

== Release ==
The film premiered at the Urbanworld Film Festival in 2017.

It had its general theatrical release in 2018 in conjunction with Black History Month, although due to the film's Afrofuturist themes its commercial opening was branded as a "Black Futures Month" event.

== Accolades ==
The film received two Canadian Screen Award nominations at the 7th Canadian Screen Awards in 2019, for Best Adapted Screenplay (Lewis) and Best Makeup (Carla Hutchinson).

== See also ==
- List of Afrofuturist films
