= Loup-garou (disambiguation) =

A Loup-garou is a mythological creature.

Loup-garou may also refer to:

- Le loup-garou, 19th-century opéra
- Loup Garou (album), 1995 album by Willy DeVille
- Loups=Garous, 2010 animated film
- Loups-garous (film), 2024 film
- Loogaroo, a shapeshifting witch or vampire in Caribbean and Mauritian mythology
