= Gang Gang (disambiguation) =

Gang Gang or gang-gang cockatoo (Callocephalon fimbriatum) is a bird found in Australia.

Gang Gang may also refer to:

== Songs ==
- "Gang Gang" (Cadet song)
- "Gang Gang" (JackBoys and Sheck Wes song)
- "Gang Gang" (Polo G and Lil Wayne song)
- "Gang Gang" by KSI from All Over the Place
- "Gang Gang" by Lil Tjay from Destined 2 Win
- "Gang Gang" by Migos from Culture II
- "Gang Gang" by Schoolboy Q from Crash Talk

== Other uses ==
- Ganggang, an Indianapolis, Indiana-based cultural development firm, United States
- Gang Gang Dance, an American experimental music band
- Gang Gang Sarah, an African witch in the folklore of Trinidad and Tobago

== See also ==
- Ganggangsullae, an ancient Korean dance
