= Rougarou =

Legendary creature in folklore

The Rougarou (/ruɡəruː/, alternatively spelled as roux-ga-roux, rugaroo, or rugaru) is a legendary creature in Cajun and Creole diaspora and a trickster in oral traditions in Métis and Francophone communities linked to traditional concepts of the werewolf.

== Versions ==
The creature known as a rougarou is as diverse as the spelling of its name, though they are all connected to francophone cultures through a common derived belief in the loup-garou (French pronunciation: [lu ɡaˈʁu], /ˈluː ɡəˈruː/). Loup is French for wolf, and garou (from Frankish warulf, cognate with English werewolf) is a man who transforms into an animal.

=== Cajun and Creole folklore ===
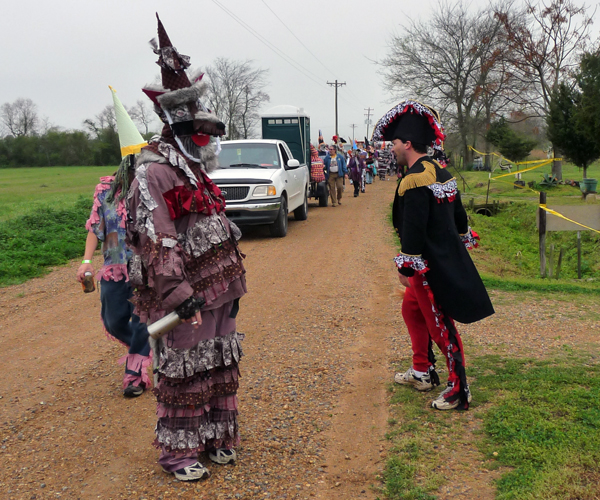
A traditional Cajun and Creole Courir de Mardi Gras costume based on a Rougarou (figure on the left)

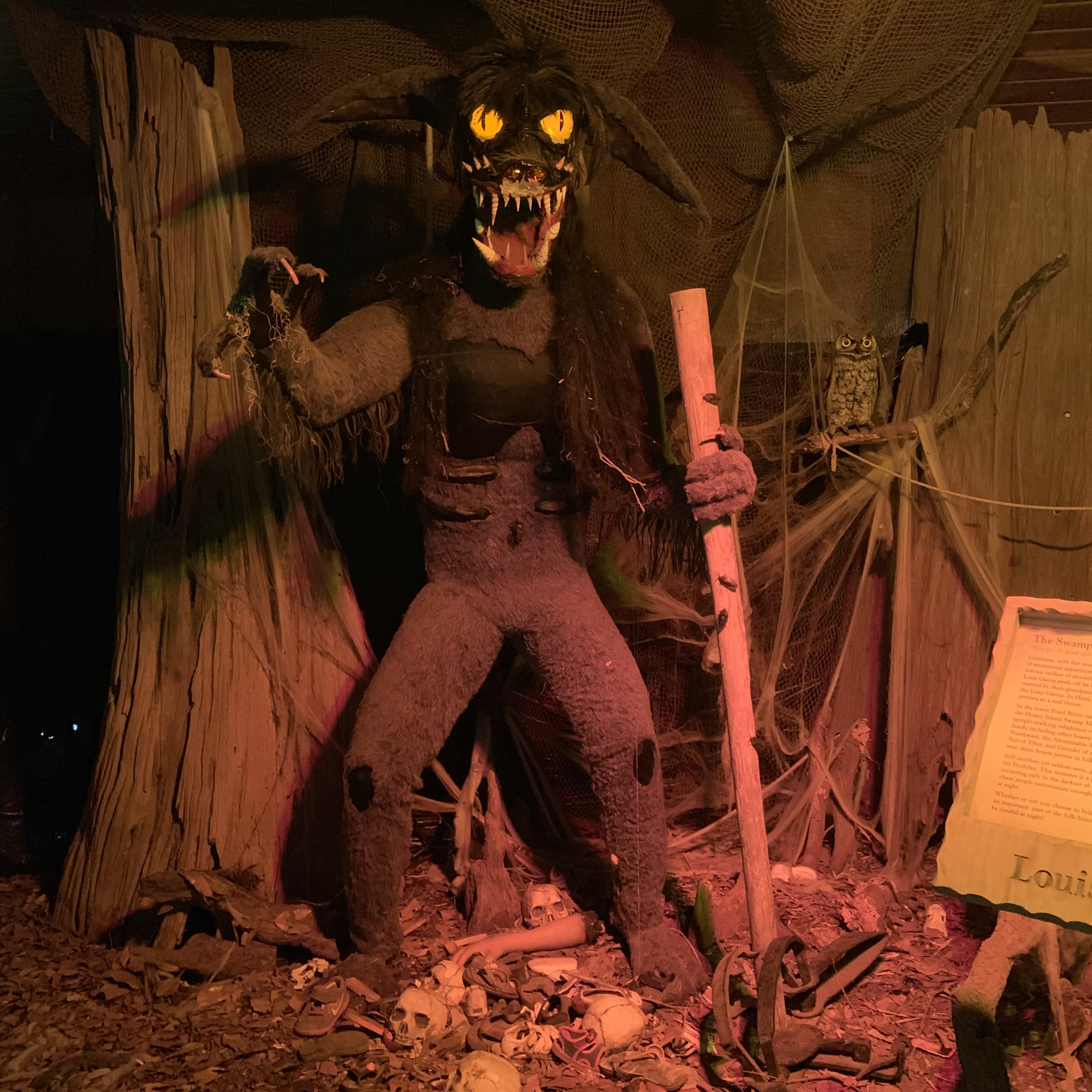
Statue representation of the Rougarou at Audubon Zoo, New Orleans, Louisiana

"Rougarou" represents a variant pronunciation and spelling of the original French loup-garou. According to Barry Jean Ancelet, an academic expert on Cajun folklore and professor at the University of Louisiana at Lafayette in America, the tale of the rougarou is a common legend across French Louisiana. Both words are used interchangeably in southern Louisiana.

The rougarou legend has been spread for many generations, either directly from French settlers to Louisiana (New France) or via the French Canadian immigrants centuries ago.

In the Creole and Cajun legends, the creature is said to prowl the swamps around Acadiana and Greater New Orleans, and the sugar cane fields and woodlands of the regions. The rougarou most often is described as a creature with a human body and the head of a wolf or dog, similar to the werewolf legend.

Often the story-telling has been used to inspire fear and obedience. One such example is stories that have been told by elders to persuade Creole and Cajun children to behave. According to another variation, the wolf-like beast will hunt down and kill Catholics who do not follow the rules of Lent. This coincides with the French Catholic loup-garou stories, according to which the method for turning into a werewolf is to break Lent seven years in a row.

A common blood sucking legend says that the rougarou is under the spell for 101 days. After that time, the curse is transferred from person to person when the rougarou draws another human's blood. During that day the creature returns to human form. Although acting sickly, the human refrains from telling others of the situation for fear of being killed. Some believe that placing 13 small objects by the door keeps the Rougarou at bay; the creature is said to be so simple-minded it can’t count beyond 12.

Other stories range from the rougarou as a rabbit to the rougarou being derived from witchcraft. In the latter claim, only a witch can make a rougarou—either by turning into a wolf herself, or by cursing others with lycanthropy.

=== Native American/First Nation folklore ===
Rugaru is the Ojibwe name for "the hairy man who appears in symptom of danger or psychic disruption in the community." Author Peter Matthiessen notes in In the Spirit of Crazy Horse that "Rugaru is not an Ojibwa word; possibly it is a corruption of loup-garou, or 'werewolf,' which French Canadian trappers may have called this spirit-being." In the same book, Native American activist Leonard Peltier relates: "'Up there in Canada, you know, That One we used to call rugaru comes up often in the conversation. You know, the people up there just take ‘Bigfoot’ for granted.'"

== In popular culture ==
The NBA team formerly known as the New Orleans Hornets filed for several new name trademarks among which was the Rougarous.

Boxer Regis Prograis (of Creole descent) goes by the nickname Rougarou.

The rougarou is incorporated into the story of an episode of the American television show NCIS: New Orleans. In the episode a victim is killed while investigating a possible sighting of the rougarou, which occurs in the 20th episode of the sixth season.

The novel Empire of Wild (2019; Penguin Random House Canada) by Cherie Dimaline is "inspired by the traditional Métis story of the Rogarou—a werewolf-like creature that haunts the roads and woods of Métis communities."

The show Shadow of the Rougarou (2022, APTN lumi, Apple TV+), by Métis director Jordan Waunch, was created with the guidance of Elders and Knowledge Keepers to best represent the communal oral story.

The roller coaster Rougarou at Cedar Point is named after this creature.

Rougarous have been repeatedly mentioned in the American TV series Supernatural, and is the monster of the week in season 4 episode "Metamorphosis".

The Rougarou is featured in the video game South of Midnight, where it is depicted as a large black and red owl-like creature. Laurent, a close friend of the Flood family, had a rough childhood since he was unable to express his anger and frustrations during tragic hardships. When his father was killed in front of him by his boss, all of his bottled up anger poured out all at once, transforming him into a Rougarou and killed his father's boss. With the help of Hazel, Laurent now has control over his transformation and carried her to where she can find the witch Huggin' Molly, who had captured her mother.

The National Arena League football team based in Shreveport, the Louisiana Rouxgaroux is nicknamed the Rougarou.

The Texas Collegiate League baseball team in Baton Rouge, Louisiana is named the Baton Rouge Rougarou.

== See also ==
- Loogaroo
- Soucouyant
- Polkaroo
