= Dorlis =

Mythological spiritual creature

The Dorlis (or husband of the night) is a mythological creature that appears in the culture of certain African countries and in the French West Indies (Martinique and Guadeloupe). It is an impure and invisible spirit that sexually harasses women (and sometimes men) at night, physically overpowering them and disturbing their rest. Its equivalent in European legends would be the incubus and succubus, and in the Caribbean, it shares characteristics with the undead of Guadeloupe.

== Description ==
According to Martiniquan beliefs, the Dorlis can enter houses through cracks or keyholes using magical methods. Women dream of making love to the man they desire, and upon waking, they find signs of its passage (exhaustion, scratches, sweat, etc.), and can even become pregnant.

If a husband is present in the house, the Dorlis can neutralize him by manipulating his big toe. However, according to the same beliefs, methods exist to avoid its attack, such as sleeping in black underwear or with nightclothes worn inside out. Another way to mislead the Dorlis is to place a container of salt near the bed, as the Dorlis would have to count every grain in it before it could act, allowing enough time for dawn to arrive and its powers to dissipate. The Dorlis is sometimes used as an excuse for illicit relationships, but it can also be the manifestation of a psychological problem.

== In literature ==
The Dorlis is the protagonist of some Antillean literary works close to magical realism. Among them is L’Homme-au-bâton (The Man with the Stick; Paris, Gallimard, 1992), by the Guadeloupean writer Ernest Pépin, which tells the story of a mysterious individual who attacks women at night, causing collective hysteria. On the other hand, the play Dimanche avec un Dorlis (Sunday with a Dorlis), by Patrick Chamoiseau (staged by Greg Germain), depicts a woman's encounter with this character, who also appears in the same author's novels. The figure of the Dorlis is used by writers to reveal the fears and contradictions of French Antillean society.

== See also ==
- Soucouyant
- Zombie

== Sources ==
- Charles Nicolas, A.; Boitard, O. (1979). "Le Dorlis. Rêve et délire à la Martinique" [The Dorlis. Dream and delirium in Martinique.]. Ethnopsychiatrica Claix (in French). 2 (2). La Pensée Sauvage: 151–178. Archived from the original on 15 September 2014.
- Hanania, Cécile (2004). "Si L'Homme-au-Bâton m'était conté : Ernest Pépin et les mystères de Pointe-à-Pitre" [If L'Homme-au-Bâton were told to me: Ernest Pépin and the mysteries of Pointe-à-Pitre.]. Dalhousie French Studies (in French). 69. Dalhousie University: 121–131. JSTOR 40837584.
- Lesne, Christian (1990). Cinq essais d'ethnopsychiatrie antillaise [Five essays on Antillean ethnopsychiatry] (in French). Éditions L'Harmattan. ISBN 2738407404.
- Slama, R.; Gillet, C.; William, R.; Longuefosse, J.-L.; Brunod, Régis (2003). "Histoire de la folie à la Martinique : 1. Les origines et leur évolution actuelle" [History of madness in Martinique: 1. The origins and their current evolution.]. L'Information Psychiatrique (in French). 79 (6). John Libbey Eurotext: 493–9.
