= The Salt Roads =

Book by Nalo Hopkinson

- First edition
- Author: Nalo Hopkinson
- Cover artist: Christian Clayton design by Don Puckey
- Language: English
- Genre: Folk tale, historical novel
- Publisher: Warner Books
- Publication date: November 2003
- Publication place: Canada
- Media type: Print (Hardback & Paperback)
- Pages: 394 pp
- ISBN: 0-446-53302-5
- OCLC: 52058275
- Dewey Decimal: 813/.54 21
- LC Class: PR9199.3.H5927 S25 2003

The Salt Roads is a novel by Canadian-Jamaican writer Nalo Hopkinson, published in 2003. It has been categorized as historical fiction, speculative fiction, science fiction, and magical realism.

== Critical acclaim ==
The novel was called "a fabulous, wonderful, inventive novel... a fine celebration of African heritage" by Jewell Parker Rhodes. Though it has been said that the novel "may have left its sci-fi/fantasy roots behind", it was nonetheless warmly received as a work that was quintessentially "Hopkinson" in many respects, not the least of which was its "re-creation of independent Black space". Hopkinson has been lauded for embracing uncommon vernaculars in her narratives, as well as melding many mythologies and cultural roots into her stories; The Salt Roads was no exception. High expectations surrounded the release of The Salt Roads after the book was identified by Warner Books as having significant crossover appeal beyond the science fiction genre, and Hopkinson went on a tour of ten cities (the biggest of her career at the time) to promote the novel.

== Plot introduction ==
Across the restrictions of time and space, the goddess Lasirén experiences and aids the struggles for freedom of the Ginen, the enslaved African people. The story is told through the eyes of Lasirén and the main three women whose lives become intertwined with her consciousness: Mer, an 18th-century enslaved woman and respected healer on a plantation in St. Domingue, Jeanne Duval, the 19th century Haitian actress/dancer and mistress to the French poet Baudelaire, and Thais, the fourth century prostitute-turned-saint. Each of the women is on her own life journey, and the goddess interweaves and influences their sexual, personal, and religious experiences.

== Title ==
When Mer, Tipingee, and Georgine go to the river to bury Georgine's stillborn child, their cries induce the '(re)birth' of Lasirén (also referred to as Ezili). As told by the goddess, she is “born from song and prayer". Later on, Lasiren will speak to Mer on the banks of the same river, and will ask Mer to find out why the salt roads are blocked. As told by Mer:

"The sea roads, they're drying up."
"The sea is drying up?"
"Not this sea, Stupid child!" Her tail slapped, sent up a fountain, exploding and drenching me. "The sea in the minds of my Ginen. The sea roads, the salt roads. And the sweet ones, too; the rivers. Can't follow them to their sources any more. You must fix it, Mer" (pg. 65).

The subject of salt roads reappears throughout the novel; the roads are the spiritual connection between the Ginen and their African deities (like Lasirén). By extension, the drying up of the salt roads represents the loss of connection between the enslaved Africans and their heritage. Mer struggles throughout the novel to understand how she can fix these salt roads, and it is understood that freeing the Ginen depends heavily upon the preservation of their roots via maintenance of the salt roads. If The Salt Roads is a story of freeing, in one interpretation or another, the Ginen, its title represents the key to that struggle.

== Plot overview ==
The Salt Roads tells a story of the Ginen fertility god, Lasirén. Lasirén moves through both the ethereal space of the Loa and the physical space of humans. She often does the latter by possession of the bodies of other characters, especially females. While inhabiting them for varying periods of time, Lasirén helps the three main human characters find their place(s) in the world, and she influences their lives and the outcomes of their decisions through direct and indirect means. The novel weaves together the stories of the three women with the common thread of Lasirén's consciousness and her efforts to help the Ginen's struggle for freedom.

The novel begins with the introduction of Mer, a slave and healer on a sugar plantation in St. Domingue. In the opening chapter, Mer and her helper/lover Tipingee deliver the stillborn child of a slave woman named Georgine. The three women later bury the body at the edge of a nearby river, and their songs and prayers deliver Lasirén into being. Lasirén subsequently appears to Mer to inform her that the salt roads are drying up, and tasks Mer with clearing them. This task underpins the majority of Mer's story - her struggles to both understand and undertake the work of clearing Lasirén's path to the minds of the Ginen drive the progression and development of the novel's plot during her lifetime. Her service to Lasirén puts Mer at odds with Makandal, and Mer's eventual possession by Lasirén at a key point in the story results in the failure of Makandal's revolution, the killing of Makandal, and the loss of Mer's tongue. Though she is later given the chance to escape her own enslavement, Mer chooses to stay with the slaves on the plantation. It is understood that Mer embodies one of Lasirén's aspects - her duty will be to heal the Ginen, and to fight for their freedom by preserving their heritage and thus keeping the salt roads clear for Lasirén.

The second main human character in The Salt Roads is Jeanne Duval, also known as Lemer and Prosper. She is a Haitian actress and singer in Paris who becomes the mistress of the author and poet, Charles Baudelaire. Jeanne's story is a struggle for economic freedom. She seeks joy and comfort, not only for herself but also for her ailing mother. Jeanne's relationship with Charles is tumultuous, and Lasirén's influence varies over the course of Jeanne's lifetime. As wealth comes and goes for Jeanne, the novel explores the importance of love, contentment, and money, as well as their relationship to one another. Ultimately, despite a long life of physical, emotional, and economic detriment, Jeanne finds herself loved and content at the end of her life as a result of Lasirén's influence. If Mer's life is a struggle for freedom from physical enslavement, Jeanne's can be understood as the struggle for freedom from economic and intellectual enslavement.

Thais, also known as Meritet, Mary, and Pretty Pearl, is the third main human character. She is a Nubian slave and prostitute living in Alexandria, Egypt. Thais' journey begins when she and her fellow slave and prostitute, Judah, decide to run away in order to see Aelia Capitolina (present-day Jerusalem). The decision to go to Aelia Capitolina is somewhat influenced by Lasirén's mental influence on Thais. Upon reaching their destination, Thais and Judah find themselves with few resources aside from what their bodies can offer. When she arrives at the famous Christian church that was the motivation for her journey, Thais has a miscarriage in the courtyard. The resulting trauma drives her to wander the desert with Judah for months with little water or food. The experience makes Thais acutely aware of herself and her surroundings, and allows her to interact with Lasirén's consciousness. Her communion with Lasirén drives her eventual sainthood through interactions with a wandering priest named Zosimus, and Thais and Judah go on to wander the desert for the remainder of their lives. Thais's open-ended story can be considered the struggle for freedom from sexual and emotional slavery.

Though the lives of the three human characters are distinct and independent, they are woven together by Lasirén's consciousness and influence. Often, prayers to Lasirén (or one of her other forms) are the catalyst for her possession of a character and the Loa's influence in the physical world. Additionally, each character's life is a facet of the Ginen's struggle for freedom, and the results of their story arcs are each a form or measure of success in that struggle.

== Setting ==
The story takes place in multiple settings, switching from character to character as well as place to place. Mer's story takes place in Saint-Domingue, during the late 17th century. It is a time when French colonization was taking place and slaves were used on plantations to harvest crops for trade.

Jeanne's story takes place in Paris and Neuilly, France during the 1840s.

Thais' story is set in Alexandria, Egypt and Aelia Capitolina, or Jerusalem, during 345 C.E..

== Structure ==
The novel is broken up into pseudo-chapters with the headings below:
BEAT...,
BREAK/
BEAT!
ONE-
...
DROP
BLUES
SISTER
SOUL
THROWING
WORD
SLIDE
SLIP
RATTLE
CHAIN
BREAK
RATTLE
PROPPING
SORROW
BLOOD
SING
RIP
TIDE
EBB
BEAT
BREAK/
RATTLE
DRINK
SAW
JIZZ
JAZZ
ROCK
DOWN
SEE
BLOW
HOLE
RIFF

The structure and arrangement of these titles mirror three poems that are present in the ROCK chapter. By doing so, Hopkinson is able to make the novel flow along the lines of a verse or chant, emphasizing its poetic sentiments.

== Point of view ==
The novel moves from first person point of view to third person point of view throughout the whole novel. When telling the stories of each of the three main characters, Mer, Jeanne, and Thais, the point of view is in first person, as each protagonist narrates the story as she sees it. It is also limited, for the characters do not appear to know every thought and detail about other characters, but what is generally accepted as true.

Also, the goddess Lasiren speaks from a first person point of view. When she speaks, the text in the novel appears differently, highlighting her other-worldliness.

There are also times when the story is told from a third person point of view. And those are times that tell the story from another's perspective, usually a lesser character, but they do not adopt a first person point of view.

== Major characters ==
=== Lasirén ===
A great Power of Africa, an lwa, is the fertility god of the Ginen. She is the power of all the waters, and gives gifts of the sea. She is called forth by the mourning of three women after Georgine's stillborn was taken to be buried properly. "I'm born from song and prayer. A small life, never begun, lends me its unused vitality. I'm born from mourning and sorrow and three women's tearful voices" (pg. 40). The novel takes us on her journey as she possesses the main characters Mer, Jeanne, and Thais.

Mer describes the goddess as "young, smooth; she was fat and well-fed. The bush of her hair tumbled bout her round, brown, beautiful face in plaits and dreadknots, tied with twists of seaweed" (pg. 64).

=== Mer ===
Also referred to as "Matant Mer" (Aunt Mer) and "Maman" (Mother). She is a medicine woman to her enslaved Ginen people of Saint Domingue. As one of the older surviving slaves on the plantation, the sick and needy look up to her for guidance and herbal cures. She knows her place, and feels that if she “denied to help [her] people, then [her] spirit wouldn’t fly home” (pg. 63). She is the first to be possessed by Lasirén, and is given the duty of finding out why the god's salt roads are blocked. She has a sexual relationship with Tipingee, mother of the house-slave Marie-Claire. She is a hard-worker and listens to the spirits, and awaits the day she can join them and no longer be a slave.

"I stick to my work. I do what I’m told. Each day I live is another day I can help my people" (Pg. 67).

"Mer always had a strange way of talking about death…about how it was good to leave life and flee away from this place where the colourless dead tormented them daily" (pg. 14).

=== Jeanne ===
Also referred to as "Lemer" and "Prosper". She is an Ethiopian entertainer in Paris. She constantly struggles with her self-worth because of the color of her skin, and often dresses elaborately to make up for its darkness. She has a sexual relationship with another dancer, Lisette, and one with a rich white writer, Charles. She possesses Lasirén after singing old songs of her grandmother. For one who makes a living based on her beauty and desirability, it is only after having a stroke, losing all mobility in her right side and her lost glamour that she finds true love and self-worth. Lasirén leaves her body after Jeanne dies a happy and loved woman.

"I should be beautiful. Always I am an entertainer" (pg. 172).

"You're dancing well, My Jeanne. Dancing in the groove I've laid for you, dancing a new story to your life" (pg. 354). (Lasirén to Jeanne.)

"I am a woman, and I am loved" (pg. 355).

=== Thais ===
Also referred to as "Pretty Pearl" and "Meritet", she is a young girl sold into prostitution paying her way to freedom in Alexandria, Egypt, 345 C.E. To her customers she goes by the name Pretty Pearl, and it is through such an encounter that Lasirén enters her body as she reaches the peak of a sexual encounter. Despite her way of living, she is pure. On a whim, she boards a ship to Aelia Capitolina (now Jerusalem) with her best friend Judah, a homosexual male and fellow slave prostitute. In Greece, Thais gets extremely ill. Lasirén pushes and motivates her to continue her journey so she can go to a church and find help. On the floor of the church, Thais has a miscarriage, losing her baby, childlike innocence, and Lasirén altogether. However, during Thais' pilgrimage to the deserts of Israel and month-long fasting, Lasirén returns to her body and speaks to Thais about the origins of the Water Goddess being.

"she is dark skinned, this beauty, and ruddy like copper. No salt-pucker of bitterness in her" (pg. 265).

"this is our life…we’ll work till Tausiris decides to release us" (pg. 277).

"I am determined that we keep going. Something is wrong with this Thais…I nudge her to keep walking" (pg. 299). (Lasirén to Thais.)

== Minor characters ==
Tipingee - Slave on the Saint Domingue plantation that belongs to Seigneur Simenon. Wife to Patrice, mother of Marie-Claire, and lover of Mer. She is emotionally and physically attached to Mer, whom she also helps with delivering babies and healing the sick on the plantation. When choosing between the freedom her husband Patrice can provide by marronage and the enslavement she must remain in with Mer, she chooses her sister, lover, and enslavement.
"Tipingee's mouth always ran away with her. The whipping scars on her back went deep from it" (pg. 26).
"Tipingee curled her rebellious toes under, but the music just went dancing along her spine, begging it to move and away in time" (pg. 76).

Georgine- A young slave girl who gets pregnant by a white carpenter man a few months after she comes of age. It is because of her stillborn child that she, Mer, and Tipingee mourn and conjure up the Ginen Goddess. Later, she gets pregnant again and gives birth to a healthy baby boy.
"Good, strong girl, Georgine. I didn't think she would be. And silent too, like a grown woman should be...She's just a whore, though" (pg. 26). (Mer's thoughts on Georgine during the birth of her child.)
"I put my arm around the little thin body of this girl a third my thirty-something years..." (Mer comforting Georgine, pg. 36).

Makandal - Slave on the Saint Domingue plantation. Leader of the slave uprising who refuses to eat salt, giving himself the powers of the gods, which include morphing his body into animals. He has a gimp hand, and every animal he turns into shares this trait. He is burned at the stake for setting the house of Seigneur Simenon on fire.
"There is another power; this Ogu. Not a fractal reflection of me, but something else. New. Male" (pg. 322). (Lasiren about the spirit that overpowers Makandal.)

Patrice - Slave on the Saint Domingue plantation. Husband to Tipingee and father of Marie-Claire. He escaped the plantation a year before on Christmas, but returns exactly a year later to support Makandal and his rebellion. During his marronage, or flight, he was free and had established a family of his own separate from the plantation to whom he returns later.
"Few more days, and you realise you're walking different. your back is straighter. You feel tall, tall. You're tired when you settle down to sleep at night, just like here on the plantation, but you fall asleep thinking of all the things your labour will bring for you. Not for you master. For you. That's what it's like" (pg. 372). (His description of life in the bush, away from the plantation and free from enslavement.)

Ti-Bois - Child slave on the Saint Domingue plantation. Learns from Mer the ways of healing and will ultimately become the healer of the plantation when Mer retires to another manor.
"Poor little one. Never enough to eat, not the kind of food that would make him grow strong... Sweet child" (pg. 136).

Charles Baudelaire - Lover of Jeanne Duval. He is fascinated by her dark skin and often corrects her poor grammar. He supports her for over a decade with money, shelter, and clothing. He loses control of his inheritance to a finance manager and must make ends meet for himself and his mistress. He attempts suicide at a restaurant, leaving in a will all his estate to Jeanne, but is rescued. Even after Jeanne's paralysis and unfaithful actions, he still watches out for her and takes care of her. He eventually dies at home in his mother's home.
"Mother of memories, mistress of mistresses,
O thou, my pleasure, thou, all my desire,
Thou shalt recall the beauty of caresses,
The charm of evenings by the gentle fire,
Mother of memories, mistress of mistresses!"
--From "The Balcony," by Charles Baudelaire (pg. 338)

Lisette - Entertainer and prostitute. Lover of Jeanne. She and Jeanne have dreams of marrying wealthy, well-off men and they both do so in the end.
"Yes, I suppose it is. It's what we dreamed of, you and I. Fine men and fine fortunes" (pg. 362). (Both Lisette and Jeanne's view on success and happiness.)

Joël - Stepbrother of Jeanne, although their relationship is questionable because of their sexual tendencies. He comes back for her during her paralysis and cares for her. However, he soon falls deep in debt because of his gambling habits and asks his sister for money from Baudelaire. During one of her stays at the sanatorium, he takes all her furniture and attempts to sell it without her knowledge. He is then sent to jail by his friend Moustique. After serving his time, he is set up in his own plantation in the Caribbean the same friend.
"He said nothing, but he thumped the wall as he strode out. Big Hands, Joël had. Heavy hands. He slammed the door" (pg. 258).

Moustique - Chef and owner of restaurant. Friend of Joël. He puts Joël in jail after he learns of his illegal actions. He then comes back to Jeanne's apartment to care for her and tell her about her brother. He and Jeanne fall in love and they live together.
"Why, the smooth-tongued charmer! I found myself smiling and inclining my head to him, like I was some grand lady" (pg. 252). (Jeanne's words about Moustique when she first met him.)

Judah - Friend of Thais who works as a male prostitute in Tausiris' tavern. He accompanies Thais on a trip to Aelia Capitolina and stays by her side as she wanders the desert for months.
"Giving his loving away for free, he was, since he was earning his money in other ways. He said the sailors were all beautiful, even the ones with scars or damaged limbs" (pg. 286).

Antoniou - Frequent patron of Thais. He gives her the idea to travel to Aelia Capitolina, but then abandons her when they arrive, seeking another brothel.
"He was a good man, Antoniou. As I cleaned myself up, I could hear his deep, hearty voice out in the bar. Always telling stories from his travels" (pg. 269).

Priest Zosimus - Priest who finds Thais and Judah in the desert. He believes that Thais is a prophet or saint who speaks the word of Mary.
"He looked at me as though I were a leper. 'You couldn't enter the house of our Lord,' he whispered, 'because you debauch your body with men'" (pg. 384).

== Major formal strategies ==
=== Symbols ===
Water- Water is where Lasiren lives. She is the Goddess of water and bears its gifts. Throughout the novel, water is associated with comfort. Mer and other slaves on the plantation often go to the river for peace and quiet, to wash, and to fish. It can representing a personal cleansing as well. When Thais prepares for customers, she washes herself with water and does the same once she has finished. The novel ends with Thais wishing to be in water; "We can wash in the Jordan. That'll be good enough" (pg. 389).
"The muffled sounds and damp dripping for some reason soothed me. Being near water always had" (pg. 151).
"Best you pray to Aziri, have some water near you; man can't make your labour flow smooth like the river" (Tipingee to Georgine during Georgine's labor, pg. 26).

Salt- Salt is a unifying element of the women in the novel. They all shed salt tears and taste/smell the bitterness of salty sweat during sexual encounters. Lasiren is called forth by these heavily salted moments, and that is how she travels from woman to woman.
"I open my mouth to try to sing the three-twist chant I can hear, and tears i didn't know before this were called tears roll in a runnelled crisscross down the thing that is my face and past my...lips? to drip salt onto my tongue. At the binding taste of salt, I begin to fall once more" (Lasiren beginning to travel through the salt she feels, pg. 46).
"Salt tears sprang from my eyes, I could feel them" (Mer- pg. 64).
"At the binding taste of salt, I begin to fall once more" (Lasiren- pg. 46).
"Georgine let the salt water run freely from her eyes" (pg. 33). "I wriggled up beside her and held her until she was still again. I licked my lips, sucking salt" (Jeanne, pg. 16). "I was born in brackish water, salty as tears. Jeanne cries often. We have salt in common" (Lasiren about Jeanne, pg. 157).

For the Ginen people, salt is a way to humble yourself to the gods.
"If you only eat unsalted food, fresh food, we believe you make Lasiren vexed, for salt is the creatures of the sea, and good for the Ginen to eat, but fresh-fresh is the flesh of Lasiren, and if you eat that, it's pride" (pg. 68).
"I humbled myself and ate salt" (Mer, pg. 100).

=== Style ===
Hopkinson employs a simple yet dramatic style through fragmented, bolded, and first-person sentences. Utilizing colloquialism, she draws the reader into her complex characters. Her sentences are detailed and extremely blunt, especially when pertaining to sexual pleasures, leaving little room for any misinterpretation. "The warmth of the drug spread all through my body, bringing blissful ease to my cramping belly" (pg. 19).
"Simenon's demon's eyes of sky glittered" (pg. 84).
"Do you wish to climb aboard me, straddle my waist, slip your cremorne into my mouth?" (pg. 74).

==== Simile ====
"...brown like rich riverbank mud..." (pg. 44)
"My heart was fluttering like something frightened had flown in there and was trying to get out" (pg. 48).
"Grunting like a great lazy pig..." (pg. 49)
"...young breasts hard and round as oranges..." (pg. 95)

==== Metaphor ====
"I sink once more to the cage of Jeanne's brain" (pg. 124).
"And she knows what a scandalous black feather she makes in the cap of this bohemian..." (pg. 156).
"With that axe slash, the river the mighty rolling river that is one Ginen story crashes full tilt into a dam" (pg. 331).
"After the mountains, still more mounitains. You Aren't there yet,, Georgine. Soon you'll have to push again for Auntie Mer" (pg. 25).

Using both similes and metaphors, Hopkinson gives the text a richness that echoes its bold text and vivid images. She also uses nature, as in the simile, "brown like rich riverbank mud," to appeal to the senses and return to a more natural and intrinsic view of each statement set forth. Returning to such sentiments, Hopkinson allows readers to connect to her ethnically-rooted characters and to tie images of oranges, mud, and rivers, all very familiar, to ideas that are represented in the novel, such as skin color, physical appearance, and identity.

==== Multiple perspectives ====
Hopkinson's use of the many distinct perspectives serves to illustrate the varied views of each of the characters in their respective situations. By shifting from Mer to Jeanne to Thais, the author gives each of the characters the ability to voice their opinions, beliefs, and, most importantly, their struggles. Only through each of their eyes can readers truly experience and observe their stations. As opposed to a third person, impersonal point of view, a first person narrative can give so much more and can enrich the text by allowing thoughts and passion to be transferred from the character to the reader.

== Wise words from The Salt Roads ==
"Lie down with the dog, get up with fleas" (pg. 2).
"People only see what they see" (pg. 24).
"Money' seems to also be a kind of food, and the woman wants for it often" (pg. 57).
"They sometimes say that the maddest fools have been touched by God" (pg. 86).
"Desire makes us all babies again" (pg. 180).
"Do not ask your future, or you will forget to live in your present" (pg. 184).
"Sometimes the machete slips in your hand and cuts you. It's not the machete at fault then, it's your carelessness" (pg. 201).
"Every act of love, of healing, strikes a blow to the evil we fight" (pg. 306).
"There is a time to fight, fierce as a cornered dog, for your freedom... It is ugly in this world, and when the killing starts, the same stick will beat the black dog and the white" (pg. 376).

== Literary significance and reception ==
"A book of wonder, courage, and magic... an electrifying bravura performance by one of our most important writers" -Junot Diaz, author of Drown

"THE SALT ROADS is a story we all should know." -Nikki Giovani, author of Quilting the Black-Eyed Pea

"Hopkinson's storytelling voice is compelling and unique." -Lalita Tademy, author of Cane River

A diverse ensemble of powerful and unforgettable women...The tale sings with verve and authenticity. A major achievement." -Herb Boyd, editor, The Harlem Reader

== Allusions to actual history, geography, and current science ==
This book is a work of historical fiction. In order to give a sense of the times, some names or real people or places have been included.

=== Allusions to literature ===
Excerpts from the poem "The Balcony" are reprinted from The Poems and Prose Poems of Charles Baudelaire, ed. James Huneker. New York: Bretanos, 1919.
Excerpts from the letters of Charles Baudelaire to Apollonie Sabatier adapted from The Letters of Baudelaire, translated by Arthur Symons. New York: Albert and Charles Boni, 1927.
Translation of Le Serpent qui danse, The Snake That Dances, by Patrick Barnard, 2003, Canada.

=== Allusions to history and religion ===
Women of Caribbean area
Haitian lwas La Sirene and Erzulie
Saint Mary of Egypt
Genen Gods and Goddesses
Makandal's Rebellion
Jeanne Duval

=== Allusions to authors and poets ===
Jules Verne
Edgar Allan Poe
Charles Baudelaire

=== Allusions to current science ===
Spirit possession
Time travel

== Awards and nominations ==
- Won the Gaylactic Spectrum Award at the Gaylaxicon of 2005.
- Was a finalist at the Nebula Awards of 2004.

== Publication history ==
- 2003, Canada, Warner Books, ISBN 0-446-53302-5, hard-cover
