= Skin Folk =

Short story collection by Nalo Hopkinson

- Author: Nalo Hopkinson
- Cover artist: Mark Harrison
- Language: English
- Genre: Science fiction, horror
- Publisher: Warner Aspect
- Publication place: United States
- English publication date: 2001
- Media type: Print (paperback)
- Pages: 272
- ISBN: 0-446-67803-1
- OCLC: 46975003
- Dewey Decimal: 813/.54 21
- LC Class: PR9199.3.H5927 S58 2001

Skin Folk is a story collection by Jamaican-Canadian writer Nalo Hopkinson, published in 2001. Winner of the 2002 World Fantasy Award for Best Story Collection, it was also selected in 2002 for the New York Times Summer Reading List and was one of the New York Times Best Books of the Year.

== Awards ==
Year	Award	Category	Result	Ref.
2002	World Fantasy Award	Collection	Won	
2003	Sunburst Award	—	Won	
