= Loogaroo =

Mythological creature

Across the Caribbean and African Disapora, the Loogaroo, Ligaroo, Lougarou or Lagahoo is a type of shapeshifter, sorcerer or vampire, similar to a werewolf. The term comes from the French word for werewolf, loup-garou. It is related to the myth of the Soucouyant.

== History ==
Stories of the Loogaroo are widespread through the Caribbean Islands, often being told to children to warn them the dangers of going out at night. Myths of the Loogaroo have also spread to other areas with a Caribbean diaspora, such as in Shepherds Bush, London. Some myths describe the Loogaroo as female, although later myths include male loogaroos as well.

In some myths, like the Soucouyant, the Loogaroo is described as a witch who has sold her soul to the Devil. She is able to shed her skin to turn into a vampiric fireball, known as a "corpse candle". According to these myths, she will have magical abilities only if she gives the Devil blood every night. She tries to give him blood of other creatures, or else he will take her own, killing her. The Loogahoo can leave her own skin (usually under a "Devil Tree," a silk cotton tree) and turn into a flame or blue ball of bright light that haunts the night searching for blood to meet the terms of her deal. After she has collected enough blood she can return to her skin and retake human form.

In later adaptations of the myth, Loogahoo is a man that has been corrupted by wealth and has dealt with the Devil to keep his status. He is often disguised as a charming and well dressed man, to lure young women to their deaths. He primarily draws blood from the stomach and abdomen.

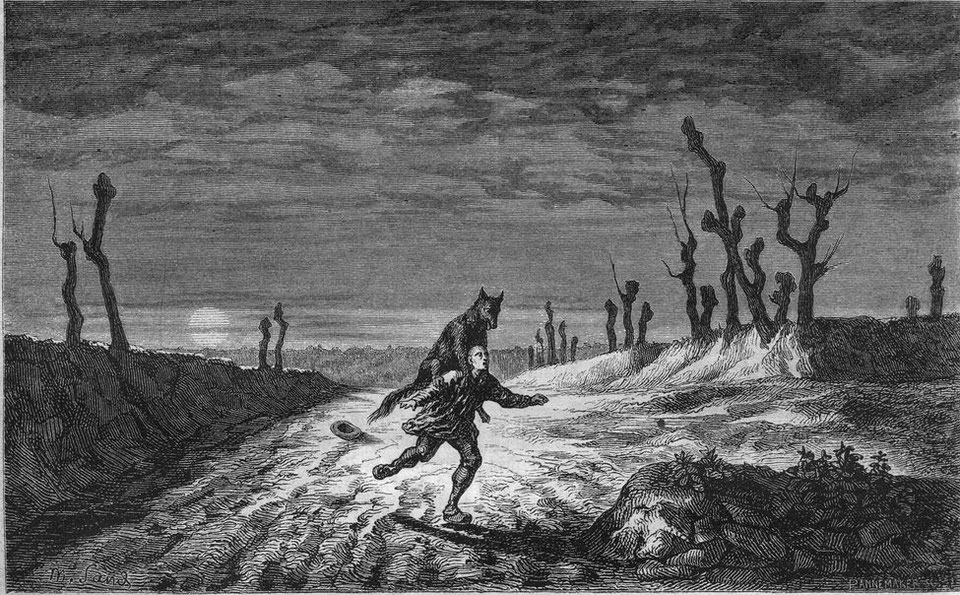
Depiction of Galipote, which may have derived from the European werewolf

=== Caribbean ===
In Haiti, the lougawou is a human, usually female, who transforms into an animal and drains blood from sleeping victims. In the Dominican Republic, the Lugarú (pronounced [luɣaˈɾu]), also known as the Galipote (Spanish pronunciation: [galiˈpote]) or Zángano (pronounced [ˈsaŋɡano]), is a mythical shapeshifter that is able to take the form of not just various animals, but also inanimate objects (such as trees or stones). It has incredible strength and is immune to bullets. Like other versions of the legend, the Lugarú was also rumoured to be immortal, and maintained this state by prowling the night to drink the blood of children.

In Trinidad and Tobago, a similar creature is called "Lagahoo" or "La Gahoo": a bloodsucking, shapeshifting sorcerer. At night, he is described as taking the appearance of a man with a coffin on his neck instead of a head, atop which are three lit candles. He carries a chain around his waist, which trails behind him, and commonly feeds on livestock. Sometimes, he is so tall his head disappears among the trees. To defeat him, he must be repeatedly struck with a stick doused in holy water and holy oils for nine days. He will then rapidly switch forms, from a savage dog, an angry bull, and stormy waves, before finally turning to mist.

=== Mauritius ===
In Mauritian folklore, the Lougarou is a notorious figure mostly used to scare children. It appears at full moon and brings trouble to the local population. Protection against the Lougarou is believed to be given if a person consults a longanis (i.e. a local sorcerer) or a treter (i.e. witch doctor). Following Cyclone Hollanda in 1994, a form of Lougarou, known as Touni Minwi (lit. "Naked at Midnight"), was believed to visit women in their homes at night. This led to hysteria among the local population; many witnesses would affirm having seen frightful manifestations at night time, including apparitions of Lougarou. The Touni Minwi phenomenon led to a large mobilization of people in the capital, Port Louis, and in the village of Lallmatie.

== See also ==
- La Diablesse
- Rougarou
- Werewolf
