= Yarra =

Yarra may refer to:

- Yarra River, a river in southern Victoria, Australia on which the city of Melbourne was founded
- Yarra Trams, a public transport company specialising in trams in Melbourne, Australia
- City of Yarra, a local government area in Victoria, Australia
- South Yarra, a suburb of Melbourne, Victoria
- Yarra, New South Wales, a locality near Goulburn, New South Wales
- Yarra Creek, Tasmania, a locality
- Division of Yarra, an abolished Australian federal electoral division
- HMAS Yarra, name of Australian naval ships
- Yarra Park, a park that surrounds the MCG and other ovals in Victoria (Australia).
- John Yarra, Australian military aviator

See also

- Jarrah (disambiguation)
