= Whispers from the Cotton Tree Root =

2000 anthology by Nalo Hopkinson

- First edition
- Author: Nalo Hopkinson, editor
- Cover artist: Michel Ange Altidort by "Mermaid and Butterflies"
- Language: English
- Genre: Science fiction, horror
- Publisher: Invisible Cities Press
- Publication date: 2000
- Publication place: United States
- Media type: Print (paperback)
- Pages: 318 pp
- ISBN: 0-9679683-2-1
- OCLC: 44502440
- Dewey Decimal: 813/.01089729 21
- LC Class: PR9205.8 .W47 2000

Whispers from the Cotton Tree Root: Caribbean Fabulist Fiction is an anthology of speculative fiction by Caribbean authors, edited by Nalo Hopkinson and published by Invisible Cities Press in 2000. It was nominated for the 2001 World Fantasy Award for Best Anthology. The book is out-of-print. Reviewing it in 2002, James Schellenberg wrote: "Whispers from the Cotton Tree Root is recommended to anyone interested in Caribbean culture. Hopkinson has done wonderful work at organizing and presenting the stories."

== Stories ==
The stories are grouped in seven sections:

=== 'Membah ===
- Marcia Douglas, "What the Periwinkle Remember" [from Madam Fate]
- Wilson Harris, "Yurokon"
- Tobias S. Buckell, "Spurn Babylon"

=== Science ===
- Roger McTair, "Just a Lark (or the Crypt of Matthew Ashdown)"
- Claude-Michel Prévost, "Tears for Érsulie Frèda: Men without Shadow"

=== Blood Thicker More Than Water ===
- H. Nigel Thomas, "The Village Cock" ["How Loud Can the Village Cock Crow?"]
- Ismith Khan, "Shadows Move in the Britannia Bar"
- Jamaica Kincaid, "My Mother"

=== The Broad Dutty Water ===
- Olive Senior, "Mad Fish"
- Opal Palmer Adisa, "Widows' Walk"
- Pamela Mordecai, "Once on the Shores of the Stream Senegambia"

=== Crick Crack ===
- Lillian Allen, "In the Beginning"
- Geoffrey Philp, "Uncle Obadiah and the Alien"
- Robert Antoni, "My Grandmother's Tale of the Buried Treasure and How She Defeated the King of Chacachacari and the Entire American Army with Her Venus-Flytraps"
- Ian McDonald, "Pot O' Rice Horowitz's House of Solace"

=== Down Inside the Chute ===
- Nalo Hopkinson, "Glass Bottle Trick"
- Antonio Benítez-Rojo, "Buried Statues"
- Camille Hernandez-Ramdwar, "Soma"

=== Dream ===
- Kamau Brathwaite, "My Funny Valentine"
- Marina Ama Omowale Maxwell, "Devil Beads"
