= Yara El-Ghadban =

Palestinian-Canadian anthropologist (born 1976)

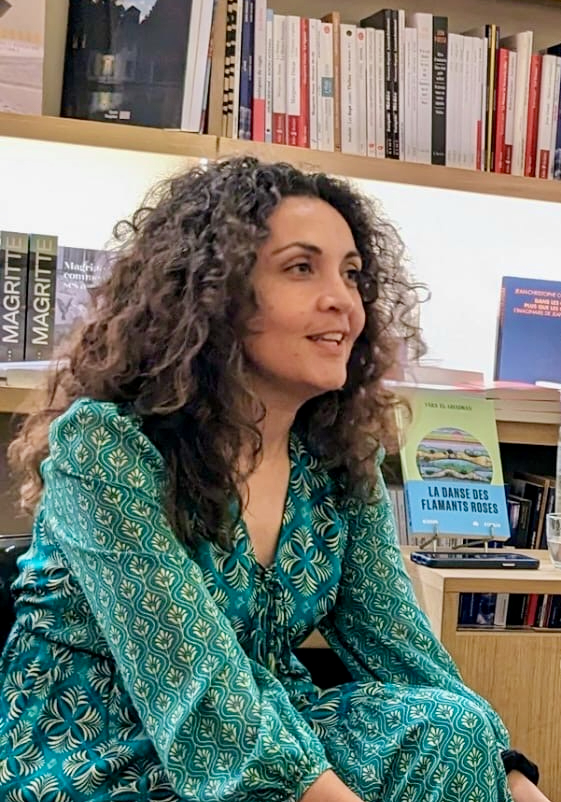
- Yara El-Ghadban in 2024
- Born: 1976 (age 49–50); Dubai
- Education: University of Montreal
- Writing career
- Genres: Novel, essay

Yara El-Ghadban (Arabic: يارا الغضبان; born 1976) is a Palestinian-Canadian anthropologist, ethnomusicologist, novelist, translator and essayist. She was born into a family of Palestinian refugees from Lebanon and Syria.

== Biography ==
Yara El-Ghadban was born in 1976 in Dubai to Palestinian refugee parents. Her father was an engineer and her mother a specialist in Arabic literature. She lived successively in Buenos Aires, Beirut, Sana'a and London, until her family settled in Montreal in 1989. After doctoral studies in anthropology and music at the University of Montreal, she taught at the University of Montreal and the University of Ottawa.

In 2017, she became president of the organization "Espace de la diversité" until 2026.

In addition to her writing practice, she also lends herself to literary translation. She co-translated De glace et d'ombre by Nigel Thomas, Vivre la diversité by Shakil Choudhury and Neige des lunes brisées by Waubgeshig Rice, all published in French by Mémoire d'encrier. Her most recent translations are Fady Joudah's Ellipse [...] and Refaat Alareer's introduction to the edited volume Gaza écrit Gaza.

In 2020, she held a writing residency, which she entitled "Manifestes avant l'aube", within the journal Mœbius , from which four texts resulted in issues 164 to 167.

In spring 2022, the magazine Lettres québécoises published in its issue 184.

In 2023, interviewed by Philosophie Magazine, as a Palestinian author, she discusses her relationship with the imagination, writing and Palestine in her novel The Dance of the Pink Flamingos: "In this novel, I dare to reverse the discourse and imagine a context where Palestine is the only place where we can still live on the planet. I wanted to create a parallel universe to show that another world is possible if we have the courage to imagine it. I am often asked how I can still keep hope but, it's very simple, that's all I have left!".

== Bibliography ==
- L'Ombre de l'olivier, Montréal, Mémoire d'encrier, 2011.
  - Réédition en format de poche, Montréal, Mémoire d'encrier, 2024.
- Le Parfum de Nour, Montréal, Mémoire d'encrier, 2015.
- Je suis Ariel Sharon, Montréal, Mémoire d'encrier, 2018.
  - Traduction en anglais I am Ariel Sharon, House of Anansi Press, 2020 (traduit par Wayne Grady).
  - Traduction en arabe أنا أرييل شارون ( المتوسطAlmutawassit), 2021, ترجمة عصام الشحادات.
  - Traduction en allemand Ich bin Ariel Scharon (Wieser Verlag), 2024, traduit par Michael v. Killisch-Horn
- Les racistes n'ont jamais vu la mer, avec Rodney Saint-Éloi, Montréal, Mémoire d'encrier, 2021,.
  - Réédition en format de poche, Montréal, Mémoire d'encrier, 2024.
- La danse des flamants roses, Montréal, Mémoire d'encrier, 2024.
- Les fascistes n'ont jamais compté les étoiles, avec Rodney Saint-Éloi, Montréal, Mémoire d'encrier, 2026.

=== Collective works ===
- Les Printemps arabes, Montréal, Mémoire d'encrier, 2011, sous la direction de Michel Peterson.
- Le Québec, la Charte, l'Autre. Et après?, Montréal, Mémoire d'encrier, 2014, sous la direction de Marie-Claude Heince, Leïla Benhadjoudja et Yara El-Ghadban.
- "Postface", et traduction de "l'Introduction" dans Gaza écrit Gaza, Montréal, Mémoire d'encrier, 2025, sous la direction de Refaat Alareer.

== Awards and distinctions ==
- 2017 : Lauréate. Prix Victor-Martyn-Lynch-Staunton du Conseil des arts du Canada
- 2019 : Lauréate. Prix de la diversité au festival Metropolis bleu pour son livre Je suis Ariel Sharon
- 2022 : Finaliste. Prix des libraires du Québec - Essai pour Les racistes n'ont jamais vu la mer
- 2024 : Lauréate. Prix Mare Nostrum, France - Roman Méditerranéen pour La danse des flamants roses
- 2025 : Lauréate. Prix du 3e Poulpe ou des écrits du dehors, France - pour La danse des flamants roses.
- 2025 : Finaliste. Prix des lycéens de la Région des Pays de la Loire, France - pour La danse des flamants roses.
- 2025 : Finaliste. Prix Frontières, France - pour La danse des flamants roses.
- 2025 : Finaliste. Prix Les yeux qui pétillent, France - pour La danse des flamants roses.
