= Midnight Robber =

2000 novel by Nalo Hopkinson

- First edition
- Author: Nalo Hopkinson
- Cover artist: Leo and Diane Dillon
- Language: English
- Genre: Science fiction; Bildungsroman
- Publisher: Warner Aspect
- Publication date: 2000
- Publication place: United States
- Media type: Print (paperback)
- Pages: 336
- ISBN: 0-446-67560-1
- OCLC: 42397150
- Dewey Decimal: 813/.54 21
- LC Class: PR9199.3.H5927 M53 2000

Midnight Robber is a science fiction bildungsroman (coming-of-age novel) by Jamaican-Canadian writer Nalo Hopkinson. Warner Aspect published the novel in 2000.

== Plot ==
The novel moves between a first-person narrator and a third-person narrator who tell the story of Tan-Tan, the Robber Queen. She lives on planet Toussaint with her father Mayor Antonio and mother Ione. The Midnight Robber is young Tan-Tan’s favorite Carnival character, and she practices Robber Queen speeches and antics for hours at a time. Toussaint is an alternate dimensional Earth peopled by the descendants of Caribbean immigrants who fled a rapidly uninhabitable climate. Its society is technologically very advanced, with Granny Nanny, the ultimate A.I. guiding and directing the fate of humanity as a whole (or at least the citizens of Toussaint). Similarly, each person has "nanomites" injected into them at birth, which allow them to hear the voice of all the A.I. as needed. After killing Ione’s lover, Antonio escapes with Tan-Tan to another alternate Earth called New Half-Way Tree, which acts as something of a prison planet for exiles.

Life on New Half-Way Tree is much harder, a primitive and dangerous world inhabited primarily by Toussaint's exiled criminal class and creatures reminiscent of Caribbean folklore. Here Tan-Tan is beaten and raped by her father Antonio, beginning at age 9. At 14 it is discovered that Tan-Tan is pregnant and she has an abortion. The assumption is made that Tan-Tan's friend Melonhead was the father, and neither of them corrects the assumption. On her 16th birthday, using a knife given as a birthday present by Antonio's guilty partner Janisette, Tan-Tan kills her father in self-defense after being raped for the first time since the abortion. Aided by a douen, bird like people who can converse and trade with humans, Tan-Tan flees from the human settlement to a douen tree-village. Soon, she realizes she is again pregnant with her father's child. Hiding among the trees, Tan-Tan learns the secrets of the douen and, to emotionally cope with her circumstances, gradually takes on the persona of the Midnight Robber, who dresses in black, spouts poetry, steals from the rich, and gives to the poor in the nearby human settlement of Chigger Bite.

Janisette, seeking vengeance for her husband's death, hears news of Tan-Tan's exploits and comes in a car to attempt capture. When Janisette accidentally discovers the secret douen village, two douen are shot dead by the humans. Janisette reveals her awareness of Antonio's actions as well as her jealousy of Tan-Tan, causing Tan-Tan to try and shoot Janisette only to be stopped by the douen, who take the gun to later attempt reverse engineering human technology for self defense. To avoid further detection, the douens destroy their village along with the tree that housed them. Tan-Tan and the young douen woman Abitefa, who had been tasked with watching over Tan-Tan, are exiled for causing the death and destruction. Tan-Tan seeks a new home, travelling between villages with her douen companion, continuing to act as the Robber Queen when the need arises. She is forced to flee upon seeing Janisette already looking for her, having followed the rumors of “Tan-Tan the Robber Queen.”

Tan-Tan arrives in a new town, looking for clothes to hide her pregnancy. She reconnects with her friend Melonhead, whom she was planning to partner with before she killed her father. Preparations for Carnival are underway, and Tan-Tan joins as a successful Robber Queen masque.

Janisette arrives in town, now driving a bullet shaped tank, and confronts Tan-Tan. Tan-Tan confesses everything in a Robber Queen speech, cowing Janisette and winning the adoration of the entire village. Melonhead wants her to stay, but Tan-Tan leaves to have her baby in the forest with him and Abitefa. It is revealed that Granny Nanny has used Tan-Tan’s baby, named Tubman, to discover how to integrate nanomites at a cellular level. Now, in the future, humans on both New Half-Way Tree and Toussaint will be able to use A.I. and communicate interdimensionally in much more advanced ways from birth.

== Cultural references ==
Midnight Robber (named after a Trinidadian traditional Carnival/Mas character) incorporates a number of characters and stories from Caribbean and Yoruba culture, including Anansi, Dry Bone, Papa Bois, Duppy, Obeah, J'Ouvert (from Trinidad Carnival), Tamosi (Kabo Tano), douens, and Eshu.

The planet on which Tan-Tan (Trinidad Carnival Character) is born is called Toussaint, after the Haitian revolutionary hero Toussaint L'Ouverture. The municipality where Tan-Tan's father is mayor is called Cockpit County, after a region in Jamaica. There is a statue of Mami Wata in the middle of the town. A local group of pedicab runners calls itself the Sou-Sou Collective, a reference to a West-African-specific form of credit union or collaborative. A nearby quarry is named Shak-Shak Bay. The company that landed the settlers on Toussaint is called the Marryshow Corporation, after T.A. Marryshow. The book also references Jonkanoo Week celebrations.

The planet Toussaint is regulated by the A.I intelligence called the Grande Nanotech Sentient Interface, which the locals nickname Granny Nanny, a reference to Nanny of the Maroons, a leader in the early 18th century guerrilla wars now known as the First Maroon War.

The planet to which the main characters are exiled is called New Half-Way Tree, a reference to the Half Way Tree neighbourhood of Kingston, Jamaica. Settlements include Sweet Pone, named after a sweet potato dessert, and Chigger Bite. One of the native creatures has been named the "manicou rat" by settlers, which is a Caribbean term for an opossum.

Tan-Tan befriends a douen whose name is "Chichibud", a reference to the Jamaican folk song. Chichibud's partner is named Benta. In the end, Tan-Tan names her child Tubman, after Harriet Tubman.

== Reception ==
Midnight Robber was nominated for a Hugo Award and shortlisted for the Nebula Award, the Tiptree Award, and the Sunburst Award.

Gary K. Wolfe praised Midnight Robber, characterizing it as "an inventive amalgam of rural folklore and advanced technology" and commending Hopkinson's distinctive narrative voice, which "reminds us that most of the world does not speak contemporary American middle-class vernacular, . . . raises questions about the highly conventionalized way that SF has always treated language, [and] mak[es] us question the hegemony of American culture in SF worlds."

Locus reviewer Faren Miller praised the novel, saying "Hopkinson take[s] potentially downbeat material and compel[s] the reader's attention with vigorous narrative, vividly eloquent prose, and forms of magic which may actually be SF."
