= Chonchon =

Mythical creature in Mapuche religion

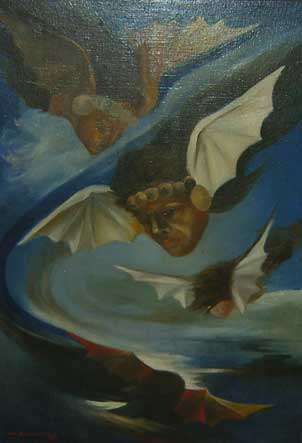
A painting depicting a chonchon.

The Chonchon (Spanish: chonchón from Mapudungun: chonchon), also known as the Tue-Tué, is a mythical creature found in Mapuche religion, as well as in the folk mythologies of Chile and southern Argentina.

== Legend ==
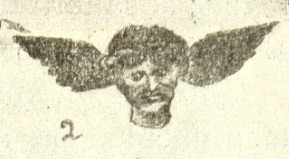
Chonchoñ of the Mapuche

According to Mapuche myth the flying head is the result of someone, usually a woman, entering into a contract with a sorcerer or brujo; consequently her head detaches by night and sprout wings, so that the chonchón takes off in flight. She makes nocturnal sound similar to bird calls. There is supposedly a secret subterranean location called the reni, where she will fly to, to join her coven, to practice witchcraft or enjoy the festivities. There are said to be anecdotes of husbands who wake up in the night and find their wives' head missing.

It is said that the kalku (or calcu, synonymous with machi witch) or evil machi) who contract with an evil spirit (wekufe), and has various servants to do his bidding, including the chon-chon, which might be an evil bird, or the kalku head he manipulates.

Thus the kalku wizard himself can transform into the flying head. Only the most powerful kalkus are said to possess the knowledge to perform the transmutation. To become a chonchon, the kalku undergoes a voluntary transformation facilitated by an anointing with a magical cream on the throat. This cream allows for the removal of the head from the body, with the detached head becoming the chonchon.

The chonchon takes the form of a human head adorned with feathers and talons. Its unusually large ears function as wings, enabling it to fly during moonless nights. It is believed that chonchons possess all the magical powers of a kalku and can only be seen by other sorcerers or individuals seeking such power. Sorcerers assume the form of the chonchon to engage in their malevolent activities, and this transformation grants them additional abilities, including the ability to drink the blood of the sick or sleeping.

While the terrifying appearance of the chonchon remains invisible to the uninitiated, they can still hear its distinctive cry of "tue tue tue." This cry is considered a dire omen and often predicts the impending death of a loved one.

== See also ==
- Flying Head – Cannibalistic spirit from Iroquois (Haudenosaunee) and Wyandot mythology
- Krasue – Spirit in Southeast Asian folklore
- Manananggal – Vampiric flying torso from Philippine folklore
- Penanggalan – Vampiric flying head in Malay myth
- Rokurokubi – Japanese yōkai with elongating neck
- Soucouyant – Legendary creature in Caribbean folklore
- Tlahuelpuchi – Mythical Mexican vampire
