= Gang Gang Sarah =

According to the folklore of Trinidad and Tobago, Gang Gang Sarah is an African witch who was blown off course to Tobago on a strong wind and landed in the village of Les Coteaux. She chose to stay for a while to search for her family, but when at last she decided to go home found that she had lost the power of flight because she had eaten salt during her stay in Golden Lane, Tobago. While in Tobago, she became the wife of a man named Tom. She lived to a great age and is remembered for her kindness.

== Interpretation ==
This story functions as a myth echoing the history of slavery in the Caribbean, "Gang Gang Sara's story speaks of the wish to return to Africa and of the impossibility of return. Sara's body has absorbed the salt of Tobago, a transformative experience that ties her to the Caribbean and provides her with a changed identity."
