= La Diablesse =

Character in Caribbean folklore

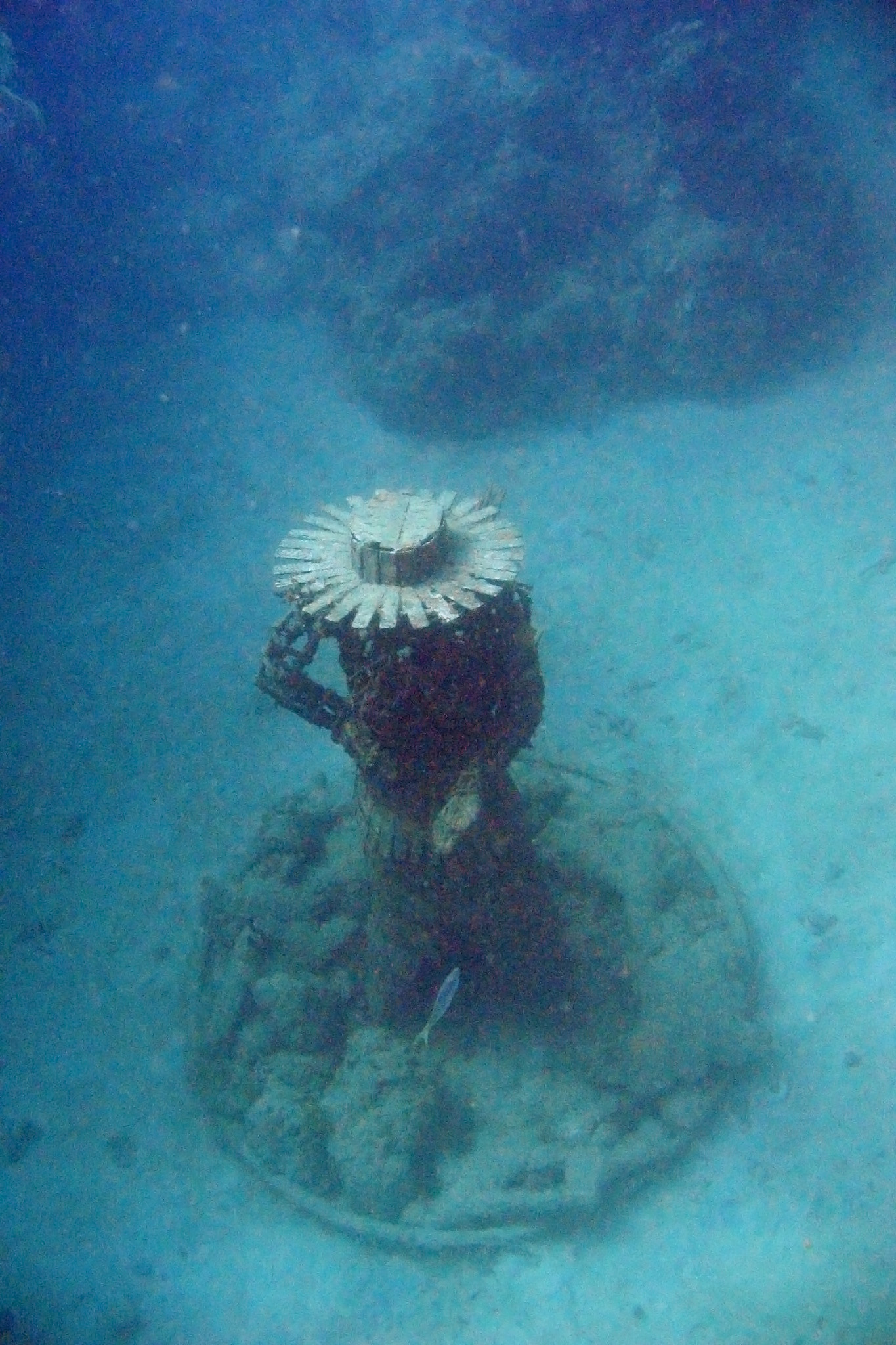
La Diablesse, Grenada Underwater Sculptures

La Diablesse (French pronunciation: [la dja.blɛs]) or Ladjablès (Haitian Creole pronunciation: [la.dʒa.blɛs]) is a character in Caribbean folklore. According to folklore, she was an enslaved African woman who made a deal with Le Diable (the Devil) to give her soul to him, becoming a demi-human, in exchange for eternal beauty.

== Depiction ==
To others, her poise, figure, and dress make her seem beautiful. However, her hideous face is hidden by a large brimmed hat, and her long dress hides the fact that one leg ends in a cow hoof. She walks with one foot on the road and her cow hoof in the grass at the side of the road. She smells distinctly of a mix of fine perfume and deadly decay.

She can cast spells on her unsuspecting male victim, whom she leads into the forest. When in the forest, she disappears. The victim (confused, lost, and scared) runs around the forest until he falls into a ravine or river, or gets eaten.

== In popular culture ==
- La Diablesse is also mentioned in The Jumbies by Tracey Baptiste.
- La Diablesse is referred by Derek Walcott in his play Dream on Monkey Mountain..
- Junot Díaz refers to La Diablesse in the nickname La Jablesse for Jenni Muñóz in The Brief Wondrous Life of Oscar Wao (2007].
- La Diablesse is the subject of a La'Diablesse Curse (2020), a horror short film by Trini director Jared Prima.

== See also ==
- Duppy
- Mami Wata
- Madam Koi Koi
