= Iara (mythology) =

Figure from Brazilian mythology

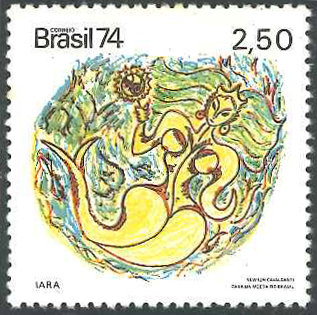
Iara in an official commemorative stamp by the Brazilian post office (1974).

Iara, also spelled Uiara, Yara or Hiara (Portuguese pronunciation: [iˈaɾɐ], [wiˈaɾɐ], [ujˈaɾɐ]) or Mãe das Águas ([ˌmɐ̃j̃ dɐz ˈaɡwɐs], "mother of the waters"), is a figure from Brazilian mythology based on Tupi and Guaraní mythology.

The Iara may have developed from the lore of the carnivorous fish-man Ipupiara. Conflation with the European myth of the siren, or a beautiful mermaid probably is part of the Iara myth as the seductress of the Amazon River.

Some commentators believe the original version of Iara must have been dark-skinned and black-haired, black-eyed, like the indigenous populations. However the Iara in the 19th century were described as blonde and blue-eyed or green-eyed, or even green haired.

== Etymology ==
The word derives from Nheengatu iiyara, from ií "water" + yara "lord; lady".

Formally the word occurs as trisyllabic, u-[y]ára or u-[i]ára.

== Physical description ==
Her physical traits, sometime given as black haired and brown eyed, may vary according to regional oral tradition, perhaps turned blonde or green, due to literary influence. João Barbosa Rodrigues (1881) insisted the freshwater Iara, in the original telling, were ascribed black hair, dark eyes, and dark skin (tez morena). though it is also admitted that the tapuyo (Westernized native) (Note: Explained as "civilized native (o gentio civilizado)", (of Pará) applied generally to such native whose original tribal name is forgot, though the term comes from the tribal name of Tapuya.) also believed in the blonde blue-eyed mermaid (sereia) of the sea.

Later, the poetry by Romantic writers in the 19th century would give her blonde hair, or green hair of the color of vegetation. (Note: Gonçalves Dias (1851), etc., for blonde, Alencar (1875) for green hair. For more details, cf.§ Literary depictions.) These were European-influenced alterations of indigenous folklore. Leandro Tocantins has professed he prefers the version where Yara is depicted more like a cabocla (suggesting copper skin tone), with long black hair and almond-shaped eyes.

Her features appears to have been altered even through the retelling of the same tale: In the tale of A Yara of the version of Manaus, as come down through Francisco Bernardino de Souza (1873), the native boy captivated by the Yara's beauty and song says her "hair was as blond as gold, tied with mururé [waterlily or water hyacinth] flowers" and that she "raised her green eyes at me". (Note: "cabellos louros como se fossem de ouro, presos por flores de mururé... Depois ergueo os olhos verdes para mim". In the French translation, the mururé is identified as some type of water lily (Nymphaeaceae), though much smaller of course than the giant Victoria of the Amazon. However, Barbosa Rodrigues identifies it as a Pontederia sp., with the common name of damo do lago [i.e. P. azurea species].) Later in Arinos's version (1917), Iara is given a complicated description by the youth, here named Jaguarari. She has hair of the color of pau d'arco tree flowers (Handroanthus spp.) (Note: Possibly yellow color, but the tree's flowers could be white to pink.) and pink skin like the plumage of the colhereira (spoonbill) bird. (Note: "..suas faces tiraram o rosado das pennas da colhereira e das flores da sapucaia" Here cohherira or colhereiro is "spoonbill", thus loosely translated as "Her face is pink like a flamingo's feathers and the flower of the coconut tree". The original Portuguese text gives "the flower of sapucaia", perhaps the purple flowers of the monkey pot Lecythis pisonis, whose fruits are called castanhas "chestnuts" in Portuguese, though L. minor is called coco de mono (in Venezuela).) In a later recension in English (1997), the Yara simply has "green hair and pink skin". (Note: "The Legend of the Yara" apud Elswit (2015). where the youth is called "Jaraguari".)

As for her pink skin-color, a connection has been made between the Iara and the boto or the pink river dolphin. The Iara may have the form of the boto's torso and tail from the waist down, or have a tail similar to manatee, or fish (the Tupi word y did not have a distinct meaning, being used in general for any riverine or freshwater lacustrine place) who sits on a rock by the river combing her hair or dozing under the sun.

== Legends ==
=== Seductress ===
She would lure the men with her sweet voice, and the seduced men are taken to her home at the bottom of the river, to be drowned. In other versions, the men who fell under the spell of the Iara would leave everything behind to live with her underwater forever, due to the fact that she was pretty and would cater for all the needs of her lover for the rest of his life. Iara is immortal, but many of her lovers age and die, so she is condemned to live most of eternity alone.

In the so-called Manaus version of the Yara legend given by Bernardino de Souza (1873), the tragic hero is an unnamed youth, a son of a tapuyo chieftain (tachaua), who becomes enchanted by the beauty and song of the Yara, and falls prey. In Arinos's version, the youth is named Jaguarari, the son of the chieftain of the Manaus people, who likewise becomes enthralled and visits the Yara at the waterfall point of Taruman (var. Tarumã) after nightfall. The worried mother begs this to stop, even suggesting they move out of the settlement to a new location. But the boy (describing the Yara as above) cannot free himself from obsessing over her. One day, the boy and the Yara are witnessed together by the villagers, but after that, the boy is seen no more.

According to some folkloric accounts, those who survive end up going crazy or survive with teeth marks on their neck. Merely passing through the iara's territory could cause a man to be melancholy, and develop nervous excitement which others perceive as madness. The symptoms resemble rabies but instead of hydrophobia ("fear of water"), he becomes hydrophilic ("attracted to water").

One of the beaches in the coast city of São Luís, Maranhão, the Olho D'Água beach is linked to the myth of Iara. The beach is said to be originated from the tears of a young indigenous woman who fell for an indigenous warrior. Iara seduced the warrior and took him away to her underwater realm. The heartbroken woman died and was buried in the sand, where two source "eyes of water" (olhos d'água, which name the beach) sprouted.

=== Warrior-maiden ===
According to Brazilian folklore, Iara was a beautiful warrior-woman, a young indigenous woman who developed admirable skills in warfare in a patriarchal tribe, gaining admiration of the whole tribe and respect from her father, the chief of the tribe, but aroused the envy of her brothers who decided to murder her during the night. The legend says Iara knew how to defend herself from her brothers' attacks and accidentally killed them. Discovered by her father, she took refuge in the woods but was captured and punished for the murders of her brothers by being drowned in the river. Other versions claim they killed her and dumped her body in the river and blamed the night goddess, Jaci, for her disappearance. Turned into a mermaid upon being saved by nearby fish on the night of a full moon or by Jaci in some versions, she decided to take revenge on all men by seducing them and drowning them in the river.

== Anecdotal versions ==
The legend of the Iara was one of the usual explanations for the disappearance of those who ventured alone into the jungle. Frederico José de Santana Néri had heard his own version of the Yara tale from a friend, but suspected it was a cover-up story for a murder. Néri gave the title as the version of Pará, and purports it to be based on a real death, the body found in water of one Januario Marinho, as reported in the local newspaper of the provincial capital (Belém). Though the dead man was Portuguese, his fiancée Mundica was from the Belém elite community, as was Néri. The fiancée recounted that the man was in the habit of visiting a water spot in the canal (igarapés) haunted by the Yara. But one time, his strange behavior upon return convinced her he had seen the Yara (which he eventually admitted, describing her as wearing a white robe and later as gold-tawny haired and emerald-green eyed). A German friend accompanied when the man went to the spot armed with rifle, but wound up being attacked and fainting. Afterwards, he seemed mentally disturbed. The story encouraged the listener to believe the man probably could not repress his impulse and returned to the water spot again, and met his fate. Néri suspected there was foul play. (Note: As for this being a cover-story for murder, Néri was subsequently told that the same girl and the German friend soon married. Having heard this, Néri declared that all could be explained, to parody the famous words of Whodunit, "Cherchez l'homme".) (Note: The tale was retold by Andrew Lang as "The Story of the Yara" with fake names and a plot improvisation towards a happy ending.) (Note: The claim that a man once married cannot see the Yara, as found also in Lang's version is mentioned by the fiancée's best friend.)

Another real-life incident tied to the iara myth concerns Dr. João Barbosa Rodrigues Júnior (1872–1931) who while collaborating with his father to domesticate a tribe, was accompanied by his wife, who was fair-skinned, blue-eyed and blonde, and when she was spotted bathing in the creek, the natives shouted "Uiara! Uiara!"

== Literary depictions ==
Antônio Gonçalves Dias's poem "A mãe d'água" (1851) describe the female figure as having golden hair, and Alexandre José de Melo Morais Filho's poem "As Uiaras" depict these singing sirens as being "whiter than the teeth of tapirs, more blonde than the skin of jaguars" and beautiful. (Note: "São alvas, mais alvas que os dentes das antas,/ Mais louras que a pele das onças… são belas!": Concert note EM-UFRJ of the concert held on 1 August 1897 at the Salão do Instituto Nacional de Música. Score by Alberto Nepomuceno.) José de Alencar's novel O tronco do Ipé (1875) gives "long tresses the same color as her leafy surroundings".

Modernists poets also alluded to the iara. Cassiano Ricardo in Martim Cererê (1928) described her as "a strange woman, very beautiful, very fair, like no other in the world: Green hair, yellow eyes. Her name was Uiara". (Note: Cassiano Ricardo, 6th ed. (1938) [1928]. Martim Cererê, p. 27 uma estranha mulher, muito linda, muito clara, como ainda não houve no mundo outro igual: Cabelos verdes, olhos amarelos. Chamava-se Uiara.) Mário de Andrade in Clã do Jabuti ('Clan of the Turtle', 1927) writes of a siren in the river, presumed to refer to the Mãe d'Água, as having "hair of green river slime" (limo verde do rio).

== Origin theories ==
It has been claimed until the 18th century, there was no Iara legend about the seductive river mermaid, but such legend grew out of the indigenous myth about the monstrous river merman known as Ipupiara ("freshwater monster" (Note: [ipupiˈaɾɐ] in Portuguese phonological rules; by that [Pre-Pombaline] time, most Brazilians still spoke línguas gerais.)).

The blond, blue-eyed image was not attested until after the mid-nineteenth century, to the best knowledge of Camara Cascudo. (Note: The authority in question, Cascudo sees the influence of Gonçalves Dias's "romantic indigenization".) (Note: The shift to blue-eyed blond image as occurring in the 18th century is attributed to Santana Néri (1889), but Néri credits the legend of the seductress Lorelei of the Rhine, attested 1801 and popularized by Heinrich Heine in the mid 19th century.) Cascudo in his earlier writing contended that though the Iara was rooted in two indigenous beings, the water-devil Ipupiara (cf. below) and the Cobra-Grande, he also saw the combining of the Portuguese lore of the Enchanted Moura (moorish girl), who was obviously dark-skinned. (Note: Cascudo's Dicionario do folclore brasileiro (1954) explores numerous other contributing European lore and indigenous water-myth.) The Iara became increasingly to be regarded as a woman-fish, after the image of the European sirens/mermaids.

== Parallels ==
The Mãe-d'água (Mother of the Water, also styled Mãe das Águas) is a supernatural being of the rivers and lakes, held to be the equivalent of the Iara of the Amazon.

The belief in Yoruba religion of the African immigrant influenced orisha, Iemanjá has been conflated with the Iara. One analysis contends that both Iara and Iemanjá share a common root origin as the purely indigenous Ipupiara. Another paper emphasizes that even though the Iemanjá which originally an ocean deity could be distinguished from the freshwater Iara, the demarcation became blurred through a long period of convergence, starting when the Europeans began proselytizing in the African-descent community.

The lore of boto river dolphin sometimes transforming into human women is likened to Iara or Iemanjá.

In her mermaid form, she is called Nyai Blorong.

There are other comparable metamorphosing and seducing beings besides the boto in Brazilian lore, such as Cobra Norato and Cobra-Grande.

The Iara is also similar to several other folkloric female figures from other regions of Latin America such as the Colombian La Patasola and the Tunda. They all function as sirens leading men to their deaths, though the Patasola and Tunda are specifically forest spirits and the Tunda does not target only men and can treat the people it kidnaps nicely.

== Adaptations ==
Andrew Lang wrote an adaptation of the legend of Yara in The Brown Fairy Book, based on Folk-Lore brésilien (by Santana Néri, Pará version summarized under § Anecdotal versions).

== Legacy and influence ==
Iara (or Yara) is a very popular female name in Brazil.

=== In modern media ===
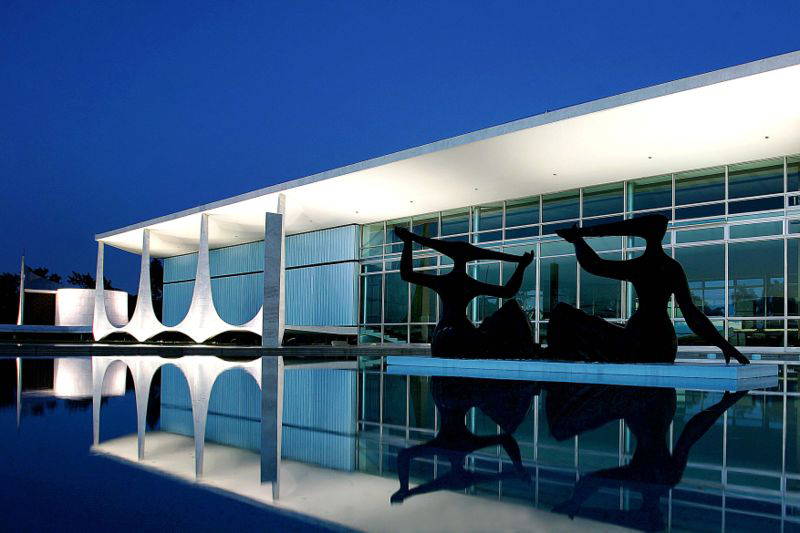
"The Iaras", bronze sculpture by Alfredo Ceschiatti ―installed at the Alvorada Palace, Brasília

In the film version of the novel Macunaíma (1969), the eponymous protagonist meets his death at the hands of an Iara. He embraces her eagerly and sees too late the blow hole in the back of her neck that gives her away as the creature she is and not the beautiful woman he mistook her for.

In 2021 Brazilian supernatural TV series, Invisible City, the protagonist meets an Iara but survives her drowning attempts. She tells him that she became an Iara after her lover killed and drowned her in a river, but she was resurrected.

In the 2021 DC Comics' Wonder Girl comic book starring the future Brazilian Wonder Woman, Yara Flor, Iara was a great Brazilian warrior who was later transformed into a mermaid-like divine being as the protector of the sacred waters. It was she who bestowed on Yara Flor her characteristic weapon of power, the Golden Boleadoras.

Iara appears in AdventureQuest Worlds. It was mentioned that Iara was knocked off the cliff into the river during a family scuffle and was turned into a mermaid by nature itself.

In Love, Death & Robots season 3 episode 9 "Jibaro" (2022), a deaf warrior meets an Iara who lures his comrades with her screams, causing them to enter a dancing frenzy, rushing to her to ultimately drown in the lake.

Iara is a minor antagonist in the television series Beastmaster, presenting as a siren who appears as a beautiful woman but it's only an illusion as she is really a water snake. She always kills the warriors she loves and she spends her story arc trying to make Dar her latest love-victim.

== See also ==
- List of legendary creatures by type#Water
- Alamoa
- Madre de aguas – Cuban folklore creature
- Yacumama (Quechua: "Madre del Agua") - legendary serpent of the Amazon

== Citations ==
=== Bibliography ===
- Arinos, Afonso, ed. (1917). "A Yara" (PDF). Lendas e tradiçiões brsilieras. Saõ Paulo: Typographia Levi. pp. 55–59.
  - Arinos, Afonso, ed. (1948). "The Yara". The Golden Land: An Anthology of Latin American Folklore in Literature. Translated by Harriet de Onís. New York: A.A. Knopf. pp. 363–366.
- Barbosa Rodrigues, João (1881). "Lendas, crenças e superstições §A Yara (1)". Revista Brazileira. Vol. 10. Rio de Janeiro: N. Midosi. pp. 35–41.
- Cascudo, Luís da Câmara (1962) [1954]. Dicionário do folclore brasileiro (in Portuguese). Vol. 1 (A–I) (2 ed.). Brasília: Instituto Nacional do Livro.: Vol. 2 (J–Z)
- Casemiro, Sandra Ramos (2012). A lenda de Iara: nacionalismo literário e folclore (PDF) (MA) (in Portuguese). Universidade de São Paulo. doi:10.11606/d.8.2012.tde-21082012-112832.
- Nomura, Hitoshi (1996). Os mamíferos no folclore. Centro, Mossoró: Fundação Vingt-Un Rosado.
- Orico, Osvaldo [in Portuguese] (1975). Mitos ameríndios e Crendices amazônicas. Rio de Janeiro: Civilização Brasileira.
- Santa-Anna Nery, F. J. de [in Portuguese] (1889). Folk-Lore brésilien : Poésie populaire. Contes et légendes. Fables et mythes. Poésie, musique, danses et croyances des Indiens. Paris: Typographia Levi.; alt etext@gallica
- Teixeira, Francisca Izabel (1992). The Ritual of Iemanjá in Brazil: A Psychoanalytic Approach. University of California, Berkeley.
- Townsend, Sarah J. (2019). "The Siren's Song; or, When an Amazonian Iara Sang Opera (in Italian) on a Bella Epoque Stage". Latin American Theatre Review. 52 (2): 149–167. doi:10.1353/ltr.2019.0007.
- Zhou, Jianing (2023). "A Lenda Iara: The History of Brazilian Folklore and How Colonization Influenced It" (PDF). American Research Journal of History and Culture. 9 (1): 25–31. doi:10.21694/2379-2914.23004 (inactive 7 November 2026).
