= Brown Girl in the Ring (novel) =

1998 novel by Nalo Hopkinson

- Book cover for Brown Girl in the Ring
- Author: Nalo Hopkinson
- Cover artist: Linda Messier
- Language: English
- Genre: Science fiction, horror, urban fantasy, magical realism, Afro-futurism
- Publisher: Warner Aspect
- Publication date: 1998
- Publication place: Canada
- Media type: Print (paperback)
- Pages: 256 pp
- ISBN: 0-446-67433-8
- OCLC: 37884766
- Dewey Decimal: 813/.54 21
- LC Class: PR9199.3.H5927 B76 1998

Brown Girl in the Ring is a 1998 novel written by Jamaican-Canadian writer Nalo Hopkinson. The novel contains Afro-Caribbean culture with themes of folklore and magical realism. The novel received critical acclaim, winning the 1999 Locus Award for Best First Novel. It was shortlisted for numerous other awards, including the Otherwise Award, Philip K. Dick Award, and Crawford Award.

In 2008, the actress and singer Jemeni defended this novel in Canada Reads, an annual literary competition broadcast on the Canadian Broadcasting Corporation.

== Plot ==
The takes place in a post-apocalyptic version of Toronto with magical realism elements. Toronto has experienced an economic and social collapse. City officials have fled to the suburbs.

The city is now ruled by crime boss Rudy Sheldon and his posse. Rudy is commissioned to find a heart for the Premier of Ontario, who needs a heart transplant.

Meanwhile, Toronto citizen Ti-Jeanne lives with her grandmother Gros-Jeanne, a well-respected apothecary and spiritualist. Mi-Jeanne, mother to Ti-Jeanne and daughter of Gros-Jeanne, went missing years prior. Ti-Jeanne has given birth to a baby boy; the child's father Tony suffers from addiction and is a member of the posse.

Rudy calls upon Tony to find a donor heart. Tony, wishing to flee the posse and begin a new life, arrives on Gros-Jeanne's doorstep asking for protection. She initially rebuffs him, but Ti-Jeanne convinces her to help Tony flee the city. Gros-Jeanne calls upon orishas for protection. The orishas agree to assist, but Rudy's posse prevents Tony and Ti-Jeanne from escaping.

Rudy is revealed to be Ti-Jeanne's grandfather, Gros-Jeanne's husband. Rudy uses a spirit known as a duppy to keep himself young and kill his enemies. The duppy was originally Mi-Jeanne, his own daughter. Rudy uses the threat of the duppy to control Tony. Tony kills Gros-Jeanne and her heart is used for Premier Uttley's transplant. In the CN Tower, Rudy uses the duppy spirit to fight against Ti-Jeanne. With the help of the orishas, she frees the duppy and kills Rudy.

Meanwhile, Premier Uttley's new heart attacks her body. After she recovers, the premier has a figurative change of heart and decides to revitalize the city of Toronto through a new series of economic policies. Ti-Jeanne forgives Tony for murdering Gros-Jeanne. The novel ends with Ti-Jeanne sitting on her steps, thinking about what she'll name her baby.

== Reception and awards ==
F&SF reviewer Charles de Lint declared Brown Girl "one of the best debut novels to appear in years", although he acknowledged initial difficulty with the novel's "phonetic spellings and sometimes convoluted sentences".

Awards and honors
Year	Award	Category	Result	Ref.
1998	James Tiptree Jr. Award	—	Honor List	
1999	Crawford Award	—	Finalist	
1999	Locus Award	First Novel	Won	
1999	Philip K. Dick Award	—	Finalist	
2000	Aurora Award	Long-form Work in English	Finalist	

== Film adaptation ==
After fifteen years of trying to adapt the novel to film, Canadian director Sharon Lewis decided to create a prequel instead. The film, titled Brown Girl Begins, was filmed in 2015/2016, and premiered in 2017 before going into general theatrical release in 2018.
