= Yara (Brazilian footballer) =

Brazilian footballer (born 1964)

Personal information
- Full name: Yara Silva
- Date of birth: 13 February 1964 (age 62)
- Position: Defender

Senior career*
Years	Team	Apps	(Gls)
- E.C. GAMA

International career^{‡}
- Brazil
- * Club domestic league appearances and goals ‡ National team caps and goals as of 5 June 1995 (before the 1995 FIFA Women's World Cup)

Yara Silva commonly known as just Yara (born 13 February 1964) is a Brazilian footballer who played as a defender for the Brazil women's national football team. She was part of the team at the 1995 FIFA Women's World Cup. At the club level, she played for E.C. GAMA.
