= Madre de aguas =

Cuban folklore creature

The Madre de aguas (Mother of water), also known as Magüi, is a mythical creature in the folklore of Cuba. She goes by the name of Mama Glo in Creole Folklore, in other islands she is called Mami Wata as well as Watramama.

The story was first told in the 1600's and says that the Madre de aguas is a giant boa snake very large and wide with the thickness of a palm tree, has two extrusions similar to horns in the frontal region of her head, and is covered in scales thick and distributed inversely as present in other boa snakes, which is impenetrable to bullets.

It is said that it inhabits rivers and lakes, which never dry out while it lives there. Madre de aguas never dies, and anyone who tries to kill or capture it dies. It also is said to be a fearsome animal that when hungry could completely engulf a calf.

== See also ==
- mãe d'agua aka Iara – Figure from Brazilian mythology
- Mami Wata – African water spirit
