= Soucouyant =

Legendary creature in Caribbean folklore

A soucouyant, among other names, is a kind of shape-shifting, blood-sucking hag present in Caribbean folklore.

== Names ==
The spirit has several regional names:

- Ol' Higue or Ole Haig in Guyana, Belize and Jamaica
- Asema in Suriname
- Hag in The Bahamas and Barbados
- Soucouyant or soucriant in Saint Lucia, Louisiana, Trinidad, and elsewhere in the Caribbean
- Soukouyan in Grenada

== Legend ==
The Soucouyant is a folklore character who appears as a reclusive old woman (or man) by day. By night, they strip off their wrinkled skin and put it in a mortar. In the form of a fireball, they fly across the dark sky in search of a victim. The Soucouyants can enter the home of their victim through any sized hole such as cracks and keyholes.

Soucouyants suck humans' blood from their arms, necks, legs and other soft regions while the victim sleeps, leaving black and blue marks on the body in the morning. If the soucouyant draws too much blood, it is believed that the victim will either die and become a soucouyant or perish entirely, leaving the killer to assume their skin. The soucouyant practices black magic. Soucouyants trade their victims' blood for evil powers with Bazil, the demon who resides in the silk cotton tree.

To expose a soucouyant, it is believed one should heap rice around their house or at the village crossroads; the creature will be obligated to gather the rice, grain by grain, and be caught in the act. To destroy one, coarse salt must be placed in the mortar with the stripped-off skin so that she perishes, unable to put it back on. The skin of the soucouyant is considered valuable and is part of black magic rituals.

Belief in soucouyants is still preserved to an extent in Guyana, Suriname and some Caribbean islands, including Saint Lucia, Dominica, Haïti and Trinidad. Many Caribbean islands have plays about the soucouyant and many other folklore characters. Some of these include Trinidad, Grenada and Barbados.

== Origin ==
Soucouyants belong to a class of spirits called jumbies. Some believe that soucouyants were brought to the Caribbean from European countries in the form of French vampire-myths. These beliefs intermingled with those of enslaved Africans.

In the French West Indies, specifically the islands of Guadeloupe and Martinique, and also in Suriname, the Soukougnan or Soukounian is a person able to shed their skin to turn into a vampiric fireball. In general, these figures can be of any gender and age.

The term "Loogaroo" is also sometimes used to describe the soucouyant; it possibly comes from the French word for werewolf: loup-garou. In Haiti, what would be considered a werewolf, is called jé-rouges ("red eyes"). As in Haiti, the Loogaroo is also common in Mauritian culture.

With the passage of time and gradual changes in the story, the soucouyant is no longer exclusively described as an elderly woman.

=== Yoruba origins ===
It is likely the origin of the Soucouyant as well as the Bahamian "Hag" have a strong connection to the Aje, or the witch of the Yoruba people. The Hag, which is similar to the Soucouyant, is very similar to the traditional definition of the Aje. Many Bahamians who descended from the Yoruba referred to old Congolese women as witches who shed their skins in the night and sucked human blood. This have many parallels to the Yoruba Aje with a few differences. Among the Yoruba, the Aje leaves her body and turns into an animal, but the Hag do not leave her body, she sheds her skin and turns into a ball of fire. Both the Hag and the Aje are associated with old women, leaving their bodies or part of it behind and sucking blood.

Items of Folk-lore from Bahama Negroes, written by Clavel and published in 1904, describes the Bahamian version. The parallels of the Bahamian Hag and Yoruba was made during the 19th century by Alfred Burdon Ellis in his book about the Yoruba published in 1894. But he associated it with the Yoruba spirit of nightmare, known as Shigidi.

In Divining the Self, Velma E Love describes the Aje as "a blood-sucking, wicked, dreadful cannibal who transforms herself into a bird at night and flies to distant places, to hold nocturnal meetings with her fellow witches."

The Bahamian Hag as described by Clavel: "when a hag enters your house, she always shed her skin. When you first see her, she appears like the flame of a candle floating about; in some way, she puts you to sleep, and resumes her body (but without the skin); she then lies on you, and sucks away every drop of blood that God has put in you." There are more references to the Bahamian Hag in Folk-tales of Andros Island, Bahamas, published in 1918 by Elsie Clews Parsons that are the same as the 1904 version of Clavel, but the Hags can also be men.

== See also ==
- Adze
- Boo hag
- Chonchon
- Dorlis
- Manananggal
- Rougarou
- Shtriga
- Silk cotton tree
