= Nalo Hopkinson =

Jamaican Canadian writer (born 1960)

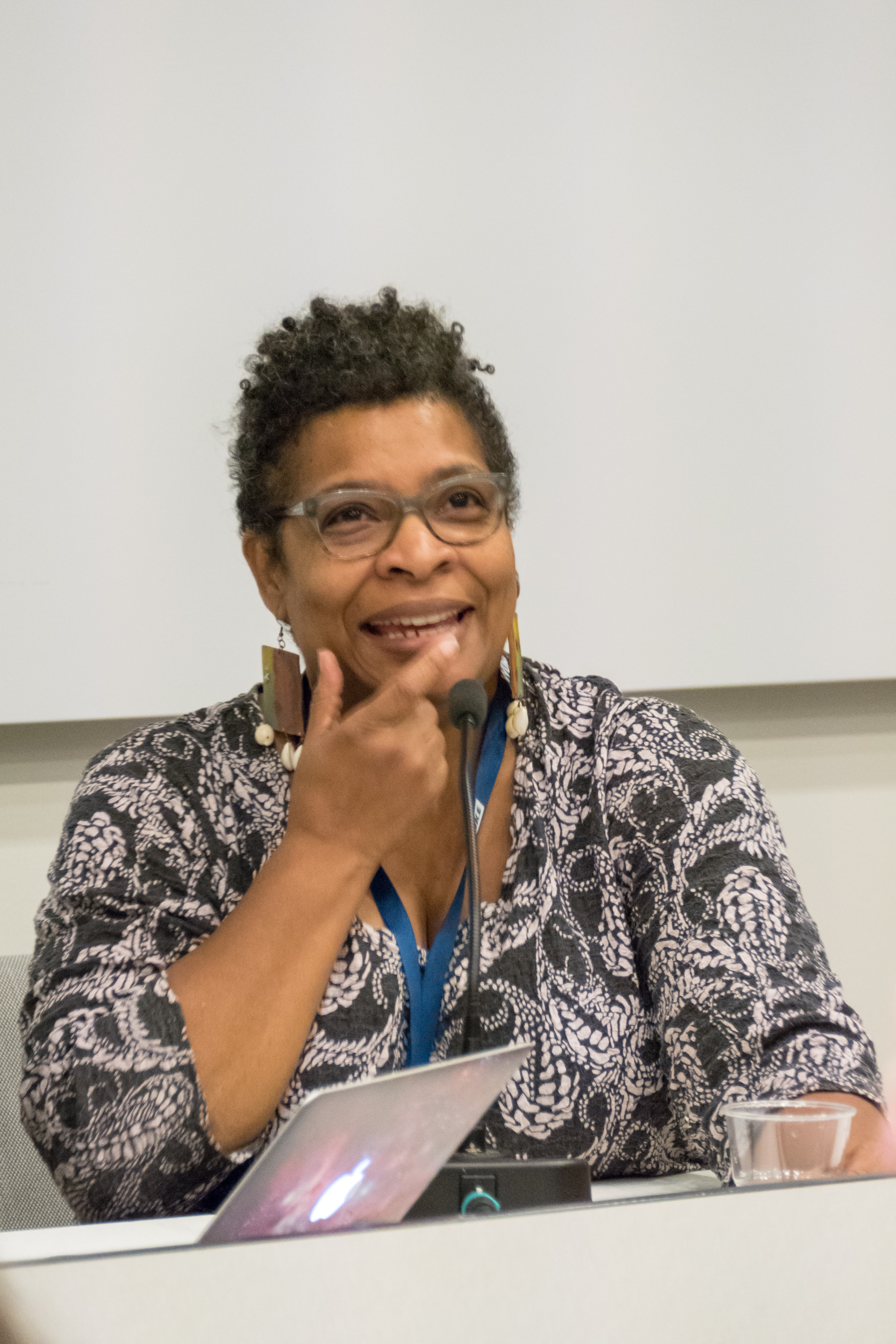
- Hopkinson in 2007
- Born: 20 December 1960 (age 65); Kingston, Jamaica
- Citizenship: Canada
- Education: Seton Hill University
- Occupations: Writer, editor
- Writing career
- Language: English
- Genres: Science fiction, fantasy
- Notable works: Brown Girl in the Ring (1998); Skin Folk (2001); The Salt Roads (2003)
- Notable awards: Prix Aurora Award; Gaylactic Spectrum Award; Inkpot Award; John W. Campbell Award for Best New Writer, Locus Award, Sunburst Award for Canadian Literature of the Fantastic; World Fantasy Award
- Movement: Afro-Surrealism
- Website: nalohopkinson.com

Nalo Hopkinson (born 20 December 1960) is a Jamaican-born Canadian speculative fiction writer and editor. Her novels – Brown Girl in the Ring (1998), Midnight Robber (2000), The Salt Roads (2003), The New Moon's Arms (2007) – and short stories such as those in her collection Skin Folk (2001) often draw on Caribbean history and language, and its traditions of oral and written storytelling.

Hopkinson has edited two fiction anthologies: Whispers from the Cotton Tree Root: Caribbean Fabulist Fiction and Mojo: Conjure Stories. She was the co-editor with Uppinder Mehan of the 2004 anthology So Long Been Dreaming: Postcolonial Visions of the Future, and with Geoff Ryman co-edited Tesseracts 9.

Hopkinson defended George Elliott Clarke's novel Whylah Falls on the CBC's Canada Reads 2002. She was the curator of Six Impossible Things, an audio series of Canadian fantastical fiction on CBC Radio One.

As of 2021, she lives and teaches in Vancouver, British Columbia. In 2020, Hopkinson was named the 37th Damon Knight Grand Master, in recognition of "lifetime achievement in science fiction and/or fantasy".

== Early life and education ==
Nalo Hopkinson was born 20 December 1960 in Kingston, Jamaica, to Freda and Abdur Rahman Slade Hopkinson. She grew up in Guyana, Trinidad, and Canada. She was raised in a literary environment; her mother was a library technician and her father a Guyanese poet, playwright and actor who also taught English and Latin. By virtue of this upbringing, Hopkinson had access to writers such as Derek Walcott during her formative years, and could read Kurt Vonnegut's works by the age of six.

Hopkinson's writing is influenced by the fairy and folk tales she read at a young age, among which were the Afro-Caribbean stories about Anansi, as well as Western works including Gulliver's Travels, the Iliad, and the Odyssey; she was also known to have read the works of Shakespeare around the time she was reading Homer. Though she lived briefly in Connecticut in the U.S. during her father's tenure at Yale University, Hopkinson has said that the culture shock from her move to Toronto from Guyana at the age of 16 was something "to which [she's] still not fully reconciled". She lived in Toronto from 1977 to 2011, before moving to Riverside, California, where she works as Professor of Creative Writing at University of California, Riverside.

Hopkinson has a Master of Arts degree in Writing Popular Fiction from Seton Hill University, where she studied with her mentor and instructor, science fiction writer James Morrow. She has learning disabilities.

== Career ==
Before working as a professor, Hopkinson held jobs in libraries, worked as a government culture research officer, and held the position of grants officer at the Toronto Arts Council. She has taught writing at various programs around the world, including stints as writer-in-residence at Clarion East, Clarion West and Clarion South. Publishing and writing was stopped for six years due to a serious illness that prevented her from working. Severe anemia, caused by fibroids as well as a vitamin D deficiency, led to financial difficulties and ultimately homelessness for two years prior to being hired by UC Riverside.

In 2011, Hopkinson was hired as an associate professor in creative writing with an emphasis on science fiction, fantasy, and magical realism at University of California, Riverside. She became a full professor in 2014.

As an author, Hopkinson often uses themes of Caribbean folklore, Afro-Caribbean culture, and feminism. She is historically conscious and uses knowledge from growing up in Caribbean communities in her writing, including the use of Creole and character backgrounds from Caribbean countries including Trinidad and Jamaica. In addition, Hopkinson consistently writes about subjects including race, class, and sexuality. Through her work, particularly in Midnight Robber, Hopkinson addresses differences in cultures as well as social issues such as child and sexual abuse.

Hopkinson has been a key speaker and guest of honor at multiple science fiction conventions. She is one of the founding members of the Carl Brandon Society and serves on the board.

Hopkinson's favorite writers include Samuel R. Delany, Tobias Buckell, and Charles R. Saunders. In addition, inspiration for her novels often comes from songs or poems with Christina Rossetti's poem "Goblin Market" serving as the inspiration for Sister Mine. Personal hobbies include sewing, cooking, gardening, and fabric design. Hopkinson designs fabrics based on historical photos and illustrations.

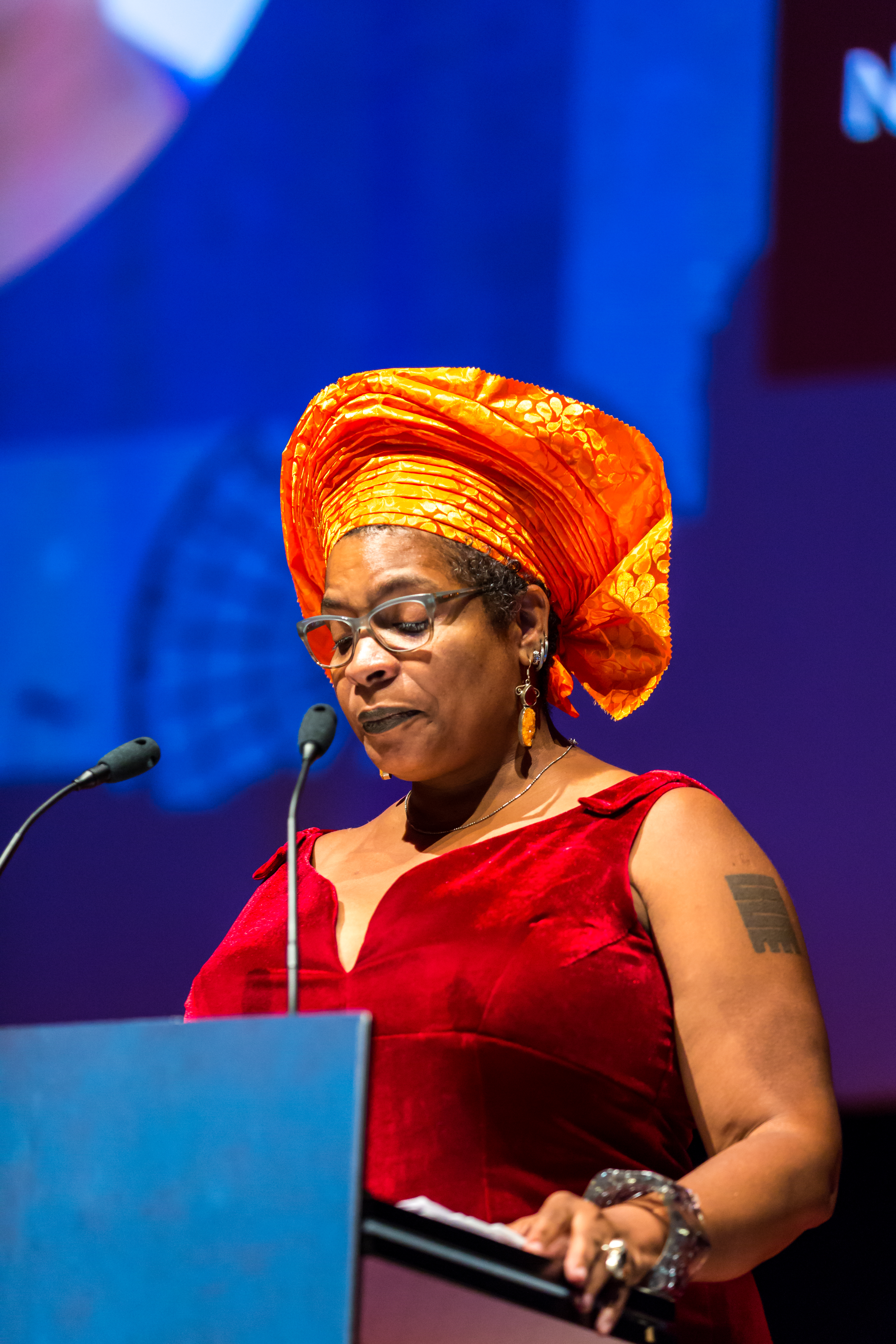
Hopkinson at the Hugo Award ceremony in 2017

== Awards and recognition ==
Hopkinson was the recipient of the 1999 John W. Campbell Award for Best New Writer and the Ontario Arts Council Foundation Award for Emerging Writers.

Brown Girl in the Ring was nominated for the Philip K. Dick Award in 1998, and received the Locus Award for Best First Novel. In 2008, it was a finalist in Canada Reads, produced by the Canadian Broadcasting Corporation.

Midnight Robber was shortlisted for the James Tiptree Jr. Memorial Award in 2000 and nominated for the Hugo Award for Best Novel in 2001.

Skin Folk received the World Fantasy Award and the Sunburst Award in 2003.

The Salt Roads received the Gaylactic Spectrum Award for positive exploration of queer issues in speculative fiction for 2004, presented at the 2005 Gaylaxicon. It was also nominated for the 2004 Nebula Award for Best Novel.

In 2008, The New Moon's Arms received the Aurora Award and the Sunburst Award, making her the first author to receive the Sunburst Award twice. This book was also nominated for the 2007 Nebula Award for Best Novel.

In 2016, Hopkinson received an Honorary Doctor of Letters from Anglia Ruskin University. In 2020, she was named the 37th Damon Knight Grand Master by the Science Fiction and Fantasy Writers of America. In 2022, her Broad Dutty Water: A Sunken Story was awarded the Theodore Sturgeon Award.

In 2024, she was inducted into the CSFFA Hall of Fame.

In 2026 she was the inaugural winner of the Andrew Pyper Prize for Genre Fiction, awarded by the Writers' Trust of Canada.

== Works ==
=== Novels ===
- Brown Girl in the Ring (1998)
- Midnight Robber (2000)
- The Salt Roads (2003)
- The New Moon's Arms (2007)
- The Chaos (2012) (Young adult fiction)
- Sister Mine (2013)
- Blackheart Man (2024)

=== Collections ===
- Skin Folk (2001)
- Report From Planet Midnight (2012) (short stories, interview and speech)
- Falling in Love With Hominids (2015)

=== Anthologies ===
- Whispers from the Cotton Tree Root: Caribbean Fabulist Fiction (2000)
- Mojo: Conjure Stories (2003)
- So Long Been Dreaming (2004)
- Tesseracts Nine with Geoff Ryman (2005)

=== Short fiction (first publications only) ===
- "Slow Cold Chick" in anthology Northern Frights 5 (1998)
- "A Habit of Waste" in anthology Women of Other Worlds: Excursions through Science Fiction and Feminism (1999)
- "Precious" in anthology Silver Birch, Blood Moon (1999)
- "The Glass Bottle Trick" in anthology Whispers from the Cotton Tree Root: Caribbean Fabulist Fiction (2000)
- "Greedy Choke Puppy" and "Ganger (Ball Lightning)" in anthology Dark Matter: A Century of Speculative Fiction from the African Diaspora
- "Midnight Robber" (excerpt from novel) reprinted in Young Bloods: Stories from Exile 1972–2001 (2001)
- "Delicious Monster" in anthology Queer Fear II (2002)
- "Shift" in journal Conjunctions: the New Wave Fabulists.
- "Herbal" in The Bakkanthology
- "Whose Upward Flight I Love" reprinted in African Voices
- "The Smile on the Face" in anthology Girls Who Bite Back: Witches, Mutants, Slayers and Freaks (2004)
- "Snow Day" in New Daughters of Africa, edited by Margaret Busby (2019).
- "Clap Back" (2021)

=== Comic book series ===
- The Sandman Universe: House of Whispers (DC/Vertigo) (2018–2020)

== See also ==
- Works by Nalo Hopkinson
- Nalo Hopkinson papers at the Special Collections and University Archives of University of California, Riverside
