= Salt (Lovelace novel) =

1996 Earl Lovelace novel

- First edition cover
- Author: Earl Lovelace
- Language: English
- Subject: neocolonialism, racism, slavery
- Genre: Novel
- Set in: Trinidad and Tobago, 1805 and 1956–1970
- Publisher: Faber (UK); Persea Books (US)
- Publication date: 1996
- Publication place: United Kingdom
- Media type: Print: hardback duodecimo
- Pages: 260
- Awards: Commonwealth Writers' Prize
- ISBN: 9780571192946
- OCLC: 644935600
- Dewey Decimal: 819.8
- LC Class: PR9272.L6 S25
- Preceded by: The Wine of Astonishment
- Followed by: Is Just a Movie

Salt is a 1996 novel by Trinidadian author Earl Lovelace. It won the 1997 Commonwealth Writers' Prize.

== Plot ==
Alford George, son of a poor farm labourer on Trinidad, does not speak until the age of six, and grows up as an outsider; later he becomes a teacher and then a politician, and dreams of leaving his homeland for Great Britain. His ancestor, Guinea John, led an 1805 slave rebellion and then apparently flew back to Africa; the other slaves had eaten too much salt and could not fly with him.

== Reception ==
In The Times, a reviewer said, "As to Lovelace's language, he is in a world of his own. It is a carnival of Creole sounds, and this is the deepest ideology of the novel, the display of the power of West Indian speech, the emancipation of the West Indian tongue from the shackles of the English sentence."

The Publishers Weekly review noted: "Using language that's as lush as the foliage of Trinidad and dialogue as vivid as the Caribbean, Lovelace creates a parable that applies to any nation struggling with unresolved racial issues and to any people struggling to free themselves from their past."

In 1997, Salt was awarded the Commonwealth Writers' Prize (Overall Winner, Best Book), and was shortlisted for the 1998 International Dublin Literary Award.

Salt contains a semi-fictionalised version of Daaga, a 19th-century rebel against British rule and leader of the St. Joseph Mutiny. Lovelace's account of the mutiny has been credited as one of the first sources to rebut myths about the mutineers perpetuated by British colonial sources.

In 2010, Salt was included on a list of 10 titles chosen by novelist Nadifa Mohamed, publisher and journalist Margaret Busby and editor Ellah Allfrey to make up "an alternative literary canon", diverse not only culturally and historically, but generically, the other books featured being: Banjo by Claude Mckay, The Black Jacobins by C. L. R. James, Under Milk Wood by Dylan Thomas, The Murderer by Roy Heath, Waiting for the Wild Beasts to Vote by Ahmadou Kourouma, Song of Lawino by Okot p'Bitek, Kindred by Octavia Butler, House of Hunger by Dambudzo Marechera and Half of a Yellow Sun by Chimamanda Ngozi Adichie.

In 2022, Salt was included on the Big Jubilee Read, a list of 70 books by Commonwealth authors produced to celebrate Queen Elizabeth II's Platinum Jubilee. The official site said that Salt "is an extraordinary tour de force by one of the pre-eminent literary presences in the Caribbean, a work which explores like none before it the intermingling of cultures that is the contemporary West Indian experience. The novel blends historical and social detail with political didacticism, but never loses Lovelace's humour or his painterly boldness with language."
