= Murder of Claire Broadbridge =

2017 murder in Trinidad and Tobago

- Location: St. Ann's
- Date: 2 September 2017; 9 years ago
- Target: Claire Broadbridge
- Attack type: Stabbing
- Deaths: 1

Claire Broadbridge (August 1937 – 2 September 2017) was a Trinidadian conservationist and museum curator who was murdered in 2017. The brutality of the crime brought attention towards violence against women and is one of the most high-profile crimes in the history of Trinidad and Tobago.

== Background ==
Doctor Claire Broadbridge was a former curator of the National Museum and Art Gallery. She served as Director of the National Museum from 1983 to 1997. In this role she had such responsibilities as art conservation of artefacts such as paintings of Michel-Jean Cazabon. Among her accomplishments include the conservation of the Holy Name Convent Chapel, Fort San Andres and the marine archaeological exploration of Scarborough Harbour in Tobago. She was a member of the Hayes Court Restoration Committee. She was director at Heritage Development Consultants. She had an interest in conserving the heritage of Trinidad and Tobago. After retiring Claire Broadbridge worked with the Smithsonian Institution. Her son Stephen Broadbridge is an environmentalist and photographer. Her niece Daniela Fifi is also a curator who directed the museum and has been honoured by the British Arts Council for her work.

== Murder ==
On 2 September 2017, Dr Broadbridge was found dead at her home at Fondes Amandes Road in the St Ann's area of Port of Spain. Authorities were alerted by reports of smoke. Her body was discovered in a bedroom, after responding firefighters extinguished the fire which partially destroyed the living room. She had been stabbed twice and had her throat slit. Investigators suspected a home invasion gone wrong. Pieces of furniture had been set on fire in an apparent attempt to destroy any evidence. The forensic pathologist believed that the murder weapon was a kitchen knife. Stephen Broadbridge criticised the Forensic Sciences Centre calling it a "national disgrace" regarding the long wait for the autopsy process. The case brought attention to crime in the country. The murder of Claire Broadbridge was the country's 321st such crime of 2017. In the same week, the murder of Ramdevi Singh, another elderly woman who was killed in nearby Chaguanas also received media attention.

On 6 September, her funeral was held at the Church of the Assumption in Maraval. The Attorney General Faris Al-Rawi was in attendance. Minister of Community Development, Culture and the Arts Nyan Gadsby-Dolly expressed her condolences. She said Dr Broadbridge would be "remembered for her invaluable contribution to the national museum and art gallery and praised her for her years of selfless service". The founder of women's rights group Womantra, Stephanie Leitch, said she was “rattled” by the murder of Dr Broadbridge who was a relative of hers. Stephen Broadbridge was critical of politicians and the police following the murder.

== Trial ==
A married couple from Morvant were arrested on suspicion of murder. They appeared at the Magistrates' Court in Port of Spain. They were awaiting trial by December 2018. Stephen Broadbridge addressed the long time in the justice system.
