= André Tanker =

Trinidad and Tobago musician (1941–2003)

André Michael Tanker (25 September 1941 – 28 February 2003) was a Trinidad and Tobago musician and composer.

== Background and career ==
Born in Woodbrook, Port of Spain, Tanker was considered one of the most original musicians that his country produced. His influence on the music of Trinidad and Tobago was compared by David Rudder to that of Bob Dylan on American music. Tanker's work defines the Caribbean folk-jazz genre.

Tanker's mother was a dancer who was a descendant of Michel-Jean Cazabon, Trinidad's first great painter. Tanker grew up close to the Invaders' pan yard and the Little Carib Theatre. His first instrument was a steelpan that he received from legendary pannist Ellie Mannette at the age of seven. When he was aged 12 or 13 Tanker began to play the guitar and cuatro. In his teens he formed a number of small ensembles with Ray Holman which played local parties. This evolved into "André Tanker and the Flamingos", which played at the Trinidad Hilton. He added jazz and was influenced by the Cuban percussionist Mongo Santamaría. In the 1960s and 1970s Tanker developed a link with Caribbean music and wrote songs of black consciousness and liberation. He developed an interest in Orisha music and African drumming, working with Andrew Beddoe of the Little Carib Theatre who was an Orisha priest.

Exposure to Indian music drew him to Indian classical music. He was influenced by Ravi Shankar and later worked extensively with Indo-Trinidadian sitarist Mungal Patasar. In 1973 Patasar and Tanker scored the soundtrack of the movie Bim, the second locally produced movie in Trinidad and Tobago. Tanker also wrote the music for the musical version of Derek Walcott's Ti-Jean and His Brothers, which was produced for the New York Shakespeare Festival in 1972. He followed this with music for Earl Lovelace's The Dragon Can't Dance and a production of Mustapha Matura's Playboy of the West Indies at the Lincoln Center.

Tanker's classic works include "Sayamanda", "Basement Party", "Morena Osha", "Hosanna Higher", and "Forward Home". André Tanker's influence is still being felt. Cousins in America including André Lassalle are representing the spirit of Andre Tanker and Cazabon.
