= The Jumbie Bird =

1961 novel by Ismith Khan

- Author: Ismith Khan
- Publisher: MacGibbon & Kee, Ivan Obolensky, George J. McLeod
- Publication date: 1961

The Jumbie Bird is the first novel by Trinidad and Tobago-born novelist Ismith Khan. Published in 1961, the semi-autobiographical novel tells the story of the Khan family, an Indo-Trinidadian Muslim family living in Port of Spain. The novel explores the transformation of formerly indentured Indian immigrants in Trinidad and Tobago into Indo-Trinidadians.

== Background ==
The Jumbie Bird was published in 1961, the year before Trinidad and Tobago's independence from the British Empire. The book is semi-autobiographical; Ismith Khan based Kale Khan closely on this grandfather, using both his name and personality, but the chronologies are altered. The real Kale Khan died in 1931, while the fictional one is still alive in 1948. Jamini, the grandson in the book, is younger than Ismith; and Rahim, the son, is weak and indecisive, unlike Khan's actual father.

Khan wrote the book while he was living in New York with his first wife.

== Summary ==
The Jumbie Bird tells the story of three generations – Kale Khan, the grandfather, a Pathan from India who migrated to Trinidad as a free immigrant (not an indentured labourer) and his wife Binti, their Trinidadian-born son, Rahim and daughter-in-law Meena, and Rahim and Meena's son, Jamini. The first part of the book tells of the life and death of Kale Khan. The second, much shorter part, tells of Binti's "emergence ... as a true matriarch" after Kale's death.

Kale is an aging former jeweller and stick-fighting champion who was once the hero of the Hussay riots. Kale and Binti migrated to Trinidad from India, leaving behind their firstborn daughter who was given away to a stranger in the Cawnpore Railway Station at Kale's insistence. Kale and Binti settle in Princes Town where he makes a reputation for himself as a stick-fighter during the Hussay riots. From there, he moves to the capital, Port of Spain, where he becomes a leader and advocate of the destitute formerly indentured Indians who live in Woodford Square and survive as porters.

Kale rejects the colonialism of the British Empire and advocates for the return to India. When the first commissioner from India arrives in Trinidad, Kale greets him at the airport. But rather than embracing his call for repatriation the commissioner reproaches him for inciting unrest among the Indians in Trinidad and says that India wishes that they would settle in Trinidad permanently. This rejection breaks Kale's spirits and the old warrior seeks death in a stick-fighting battle.

After Kale's death, Binti returns to the family from which Kale banished her when her son was a child. She rescues Rahim from the despair he has fallen into after losing his business and banishes the jumbie bird who has come to claim his life. She repairs the strained relationships between Rahim and his wife and son and, against the odds, secures her grandson a place in the prestigious Queen's Royal College.

== Themes ==
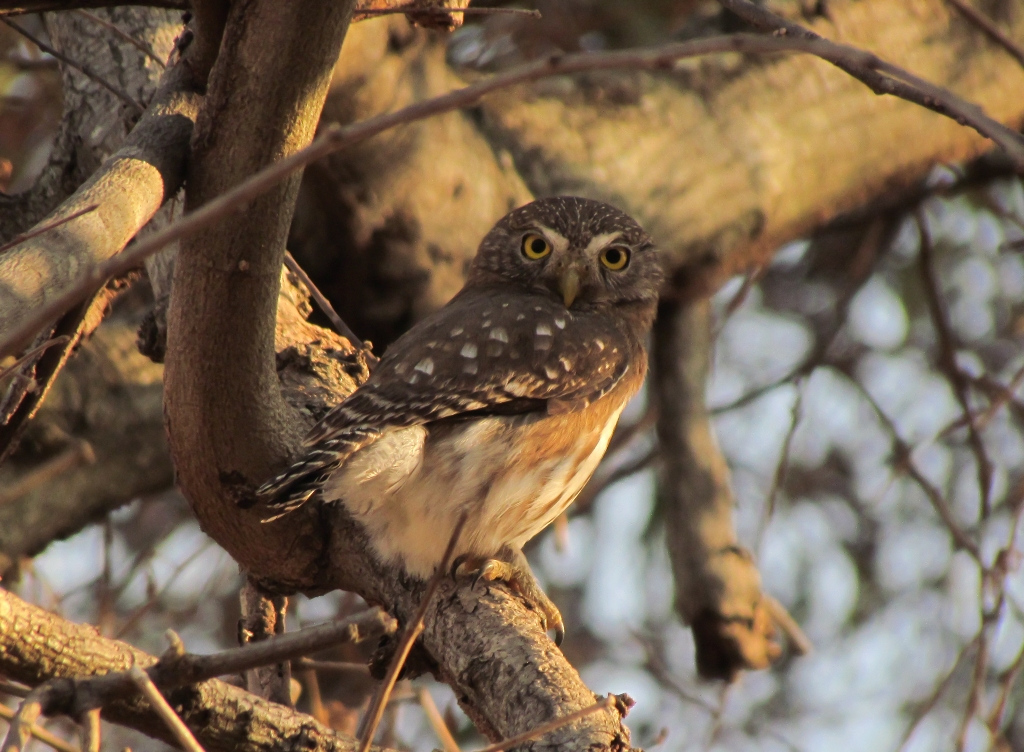
The ferruginous pygmy owl is known as the jumbie bird in Trinidad and Tobago.

The book explores the transformation of "East Indians" into Indo-Trinidadians. According to University of San Diego scholar Atreyee Phukan, Khan used the "language and vocabulary of Afro-Caribbean mythology" as it depicts the "cultural hybridization" of the Muslim Pathan minority.

In Trinidad and Tobago, the jumbie bird is the common name of the ferruginous pygmy owl, a small owl that is often heard but rarely seen. In folklore it is seen as a harbinger of death. Khan expands on these beliefs to endow the bird with "more extensive powers befitting a deity". In his critical analysis of Khan's work, Roydon Salick suggests that the difference between Khan's portrayal of the jumbie bird and the actual bird suggests that he had never knowingly seen or heard the bird.

== Analysis ==
Like his fellow Indo-Trinidadian contemporaries V. S. Naipaul and Sam Selvon, in writing The Jumbie Bird Khan sought to put Trinidad on the literary map. Since the jumbie bird itself does not play a major role in the story's narrative, Salick suggests that the title of the book reflects Khan's desire "to present a specifically Trinidadian experience".

== Publication ==
The book was first published by MacGibbon & Kee in the United Kingdom in 1961. Khan's close friend, Sam Selvon, had encouraged him to submit it to MacGibbon & Kee who had previously published Selvon's Ways of Sunlight in 1957 and Turn Again Tiger in 1958.
