= House of Hunger (Henderson novel) =

2022 horror novel by Alexis Henderson

- Author: Alexis Henderson
- Language: English
- Genre: Horror
- Published: 27 Sep 2022
- Publisher: Ace Books
- Pages: 304
- ISBN: 9780593438466

House of Hunger is a 2022 horror novel by Alexis Henderson. It is the author's second novel. The story is set in a world where nobles feed on the blood of their servants. The plot follows the life of Marion as she becomes a bloodmaid at the House of Hunger.

== Plot ==
In the far North, wealthy nobles drink the blood of their servants, known as bloodmaids. Marion Shaw, a house cleaner working in the southern city of Prane, sees an ad for the position of bloodmaid in a local paper. She applies and is accepted to serve in the House of Hunger, a noble house led by Countess Lisavet Bathory. Lisavet suffers from a hereditary illness known as the Hunger. The illness requires her to drink the blood of healthy young women in order to survive. Before leaving Prane, Marion fights with her brother about accepting the position. She pushes him into the fireplace, accidentally fracturing his skull and killing him.

Marion signs a contract to become indentured to the House of Hunger; at the conclusion of her service, she will receive a large pension. Marion and Cecilia, the First Bloodmaid, squabble for power and Lisavet's favor. Lisavet announces that Marion will become the First Bloodmaid instead of Cecilia. Cecilia attacks Marion and is banished from the House. Lisavet states she has been sent to a sanatorium to recuperate; the other bloodmaids may write to her, but they cannot visit. Marion becomes Lisavet's lover.

Marion learns that all of the other bloodmaids' letters to Cecilia have never been sent, and that there is no record of any bloodmaid receiving a pension in their retirement. Marion discovers that Cecilia is being kept in a torture chamber under the manor. She watches from the shadows as Lisavet bites Cecilia and drinks her blood, stealing her life force and aging Cecilia into an elderly woman.

Marion makes a deal with Sir Ivor of the House of Fog. In exchange for money to escape, she will testify against Lisavet in court. Ivor is Lisavet's nearest relative, which would allow him to inherit the House of Hunger. Ivor betrays the plot to Lisavet. Lisavet kills him, then takes all of her bloodmaids to the torture chamber. Cecilia attacks Lisavet; she is killed, but the other bloodmaids escape. Lisavet chases Marion through the catacombs and into the mansion. Marion stabs Lisavet with a bleeding needle, killing her. Marion and the surviving bloodmaids use Ivor’s money to escape the North.

== Major themes ==
A review in Paste Magazine points out that Lisavet's bloodmaids are generally from impoverished backgrounds, with limited sexual experiences that make them more susceptible to her advances. It is unclear if Lisavet actually cares for Marion; this question is intentionally ambiguous. The novel explores the concept of power dynamics within the relationship between Lisavet, as an employer, and her bloodmaids.

== Reception ==
Publishers Weekly gave the novel a starred review, writing that Henderson is "one of horror’s best new voices" and calling the novel "compulsively readable". Writing for the New York Times, Danielle Trussoni called the novel "a pleasure to read", praising the "Dickensian plot and gorgeous Victorian steampunk setting." Trussoni compared the book positively to the works of Anne Rice. A review in Paste Magazine praised the novel for its unique twist on vampire stories and called the worldbuilding "the novel's standout element".

Writing for Tor.com, Alex Brown praised the way that queerness is treated as normal within the narrative, and that race does not seem to be a major factor of oppression. Brown praised the novel's conclusion, calling it a "killer sophomore novel". However, the same review stated that the novel's pacing dragged throughout the middle of the story. It also noted that the novel's tight focus on Marion was detrimental to the story due to the lack of worldbuilding regarding the other Houses.

== See also ==
- Elizabeth Báthory
