= Ismith Khan =

American novelist

- Born: March 16, 1925; Port of Spain, Trinidad and Tobago, British Windward Islands
- Died: April 24, 2002 (aged 77); New York City, US
- Education: Queen's Royal College; Michigan State University; The New School for Social Research (B.A.); Johns Hopkins University (M.A.)
- Occupation: Writer
- Children: 2
- Writing career
- Genres: Trinidad and Tobago literature, West Indian literature, postcolonial literature

Mohamed Ismith Khan (March 16, 1925 – April 24, 2002) was a Trinidad and Tobago-born American author and educator. He is best known for his novel The Jumbie Bird, a semi-autobiographical work which blends Indian and Afro-Caribbean mythology and experience to explore the creation of a new Indo-Caribbean identity.

== Early life and education ==
Ismith Khan was born to Faiez and Zinab Khan in Port of Spain, to a Muslim family of Indian Pathan descent. His paternal grandfather, Kale Khan, left British India after participating in the Indian Rebellion of 1857 and migrated to British Guiana. He later moved to Trinidad and Tobago, where he established a jewellery business. After surviving the Hosay massacre in 1884, Kale Khan settled in Port of Spain where he established what his grandson later described as "the largest and most famous jewellery shop in Port of Spain". He lived with his son Faiez and his family when Ismith was a child, and inspired one of the main characters in The Jumbie Bird.

Ismith Khan attended Queen's Royal College, where he completed the Cambridge School Certificate and graduated in 1945. In 1947 he enrolled in the Indiana University Fort Wayne to study engineering, but dropped out after a year because he was short on funds. He returned to Trinidad and Tobago in 1948 and took a job as a reporter at the Trinidad Guardian newspaper at the recommendation of Sam Selvon. Khan had met Selvon in 1941 when Khan's sister, Betty, and Selvon's brother, Dennis, were married. Khan and Selvon worked together at the Guardian and became "lifelong friends". Khan considered his friendship with Selvon to be "the single most powerful influence on him becoming a writer".

While working at the Guardian, Khan was assigned to interview Mariam Ghose, a graduate student at Michigan State University who was in Trinidad and Tobago doing research. Ghose encouraged Khan to apply for a tuition scholarship to Michigan State University, and in the fall of 1948 Khan left Trinidad and Tobago to pursue a degree in sociology. Khan and Ghose were married in 1949. He completed his course work, but was unable to graduate because he was unwilling to take a course in physical education, which the degree required. In 1952, two courses short of a degree, Khan transferred to The New School for Social Research in New York, where he completed his degree in sociology. Originally interested in journalism, Khan took several fiction-writing workshops at The New School, which prompted him to pursue fiction instead of journalism. In 1958, Khan became an American citizen.

While living in New York, Khan wrote his first two novels, The Jumbie Bird and The Obeah Man, and most of his short stories. In 1964 Khan met Vera Reichler and became romantically involved with her. They moved in together in 1966, and were married in 1969 after his divorce was finalised. In the fall of that year they moved from New York to Baltimore after Khan was admitted to the creative writing program at Johns Hopkins University. In 1970 Khan received an M.A. in creative writing and submitted The Crucifixion, which he had started writing before leaving New York, as his thesis.

== Career ==
Khan's first novel, The Jumbie Bird, was published in 1961. His second novel, The Obeah Man, was published in 1964 and his third novel, The Crucifixion, which was written as part of his master's thesis, was published in 1987. A collection of short stories, A Day in the Country and Other Stories, was published in 1990.

Khan taught at The New School and Johns Hopkins University between 1955 and 1970. Between 1970 and 1982 he was based in California, and taught at the University of California, Berkeley, University of California, San Diego, University of Southern California, and California State College, Long Beach. After the end of his third marriage in 1982, he returned to New York, where he continued to write and taught as an adjunct at Medgar Evers College.

Khan's work was overshadowed by his two more prominent Indo-Trinidadian contemporary novelists – V.S. Naipaul and Sam Selvon. Khan's relative obscurity may have been due to the fact that he was based in the United States while his contemporaries were based in London, which "functioned as the English Caribbean's literary capital" and provided a support network.

=== The Jumbie Bird ===
Khan's first novel, The Jumbie Bird, was published in 1961, on the eve of Trinidad and Tobago's independence from the British Empire. It tells the story of three generations of men – Kale Khan, the grandfather, a Pathan from India who migrated to Trinidad as a free immigrant (not an indentured labourer); his Trinidadian-born son, Rahim; and Rahim's son, Jamini. The book is semi-autobiographical (Khan based Kale Khan closely on this grandfather, using both his name and personality). The novel also blends Indian and Afro-Caribbean mythology and experience to explore the creation of a new Indo-Caribbean identity.

=== The Obeah Man ===
Khan's second novel, The Obeah Man, was published in 1964. It tells the story of Zampi, an obeah man who lives at Blue Basin in the hills above Diego Martin, west of Port of Spain; his lover, Zolda, who lives in a hut at La Basse, a community built on the margin of a landfill on the east side of Port of Spain; and two other residents of La Basse – Hop and Drop, a disabled man, and Massahood, a stick–fighter. The novel spans a three-day period from Carnival Monday morning through Ash Wednesday morning.

The Obeah Man is the only novel in West Indian literature to feature an obeah man as its main character.

=== The Crucifixion ===
Khan's third novel, The Crucifixion, was published in 1987, seventeen years after it was submitted as part of his master's thesis at Johns Hopkins University. After being rejected by two publishers, the novel remained unpublished until Jeremy Poynting of Peepal Tree Press learned of it and agreed to publish it.

The Crucifixion tells the story of Manko, a young man from the country who hears the voice of God calling him to become a preacher. Manko moves to the city, settles in a barrack yard in Port of Spain, and eventually arranges his own crucifixion on Calvary Hill in the eastern part of the city. In his critical analysis of Khan's work, Roydon Salick contrasts the presentation of life in the barrack yards as presented in this book with the more hopeful picture in C. L. R. James' Minty Alley, which also tells the story of life in Port of Spain's barrack yards.

Manko is based on the same character that inspired Man-Man in Naipaul's Miguel Street, Brackley in Selvon's The Lonely Londoners, and Taffy in Earl Lovelace's The Dragon Can't Dance. Salick considers the underlying character to be folkloric, and "possibly real", and notes that Khan is the only one who gives the character a complete backstory.

=== A Day in the Country and Other Stories ===
Khan's fourth work, a collection of nine short stories entitled A Day in the Country and Other Stories, was published by Peepal Tree Press in 1994. Three of these had been published previously — "The Red Ball", "Shadows Move in the Britannia Bar" and "A Day in the Country" — while the other six were unpublished. The stories are all set in Trinidad and deal with the relationship between father (or father-figure) and son.

== Style ==
Khan's work is notable for his use of Trinidadian dialect and his ability to capture its speech patterns.

== Themes ==
The themes of Khan's work are "firmly grounded in Trinidad"; he wrote of the Indian experience in the Caribbean and the relationships between ethnic groups in this racially diverse region. Khan's work addresses the experience of childhood, the clash of cultures, and the search for identity, all common themes in West Indian literature.
