= National Museum and Art Gallery, Trinidad =

National museum of Trinidad and Tobago

Coordinates: 10.6629°N 61.5103°W

National Museum and Art Gallery
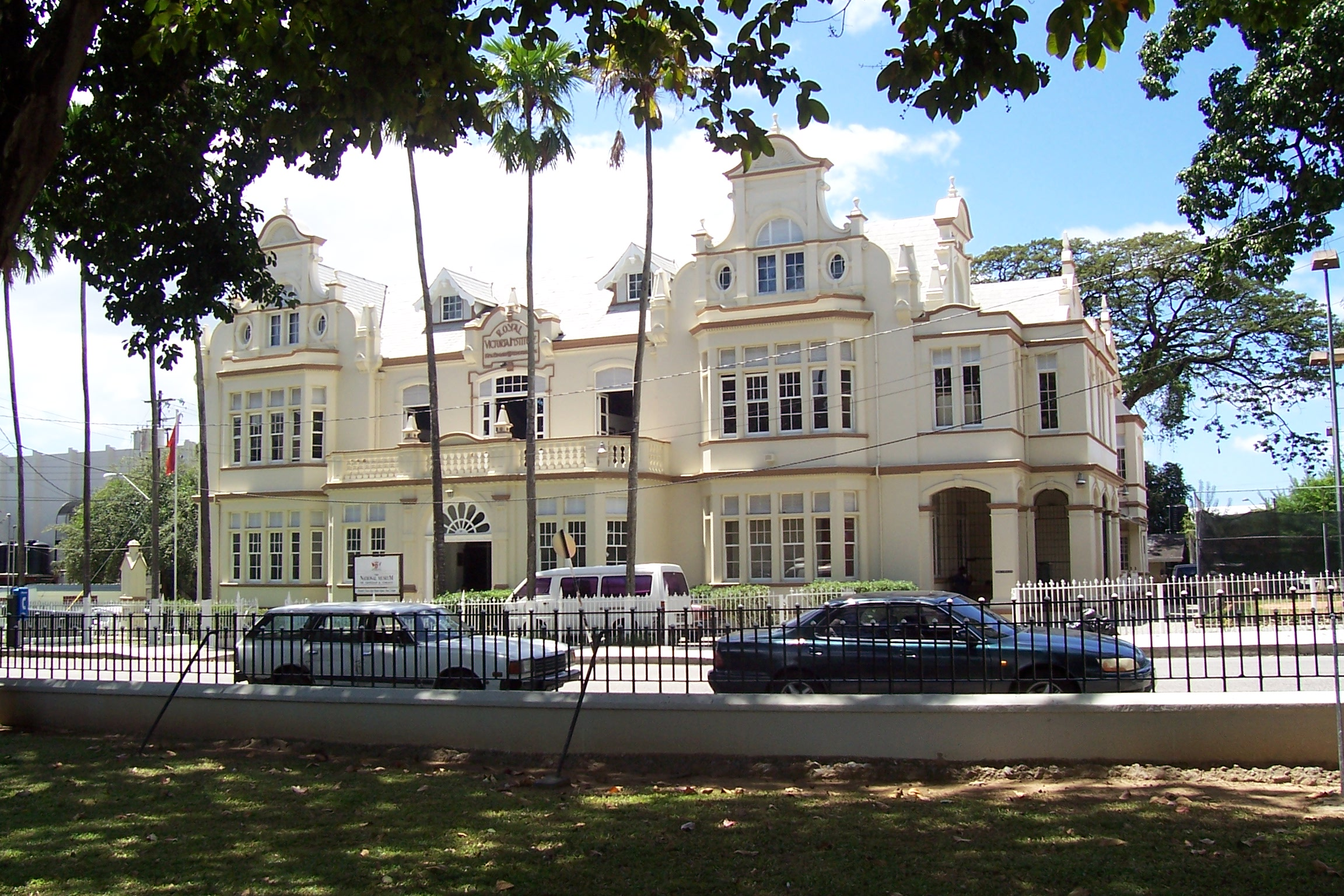
- Established: 1892
- Location: Frederick Street, Port of Spain, Trinidad, Trinidad and Tobago

The National Museum and Art Gallery is the national museum of Trinidad and Tobago, in Port of Spain on Trinidad island. It is located at the top of Frederick Street, opposite the Memorial Park, and just south of the Queen's Park Savannah.

The museum was established in 1892, as the Royal Victoria Institute. The building is an example of Victorian era colonial style of the British West Indies.

== Features ==
The Museum manages a collection of some 10,000 items, including a collection of paintings by Michel-Jean Cazabon. Among the many items on display in seven major galleries are petroleum and geological exhibits, the permanent national art collection, and a small gallery on Trinidad's Carnival arts.

The facilities include an audio-visual room which is used in an active educational programme.

== Branch museums ==
Branches of the National Museum and Art Gallery include:

- The Museum of the City of Port of Spain — at Fort San Andrés on South Quay, Port of Spain.
- Museum of the Police Service of Trinidad and Tobago — at Police Headquarters, St Vincent Street, Port of Spain.
- Money Museum — in the Central Bank at Eric Williams Financial Plaza, Independence Square, Port of Spain.

== Directors ==
- Claire Broadbridge (1983 to 1997)

== See also ==
- List of museums in Trinidad and Tobago
