= Earl Lovelace =

Trinidadian novelist (born 1935)

- Born: Earl Wilbert Lovelace; 13 July 1935 (age 91); Toco, Trinidad and Tobago
- Education: Howard University; Johns Hopkins University (MA)
- Occupations: Novelist, playwright, short story writer, journalist
- Notable work: The Dragon Can't Dance (1979); The Wine of Astonishment (1982); Salt (1996); Is Just a Movie (2011)
- Relatives: Che Lovelace (son)
- Awards: Commonwealth Writers' Prize; OCM Bocas Prize for Caribbean Literature

Earl Wilbert Lovelace (born 13 July 1935) is a Trinidad and Tobago novelist, journalist, playwright, and short story writer. He is particularly recognized for his descriptive, dramatic fiction on Trinidadian culture: "Using Trinidadian dialect patterns and standard English, he probes the paradoxes often inherent in social change as well as the clash between rural and urban cultures." As Bernardine Evaristo notes, "Lovelace is unusual among celebrated Caribbean writers in that he has always lived in Trinidad. Most writers leave to find support for their literary endeavours elsewhere and this, arguably, shapes the literature, especially after long periods of exile. But Lovelace's fiction is deeply embedded in Trinidadian society and is written from the perspective of one whose ties to his homeland have never been broken."

Lovelace's first novel, While Gods Are Falling, published in 1965, won the Trinidad and Tobago Independence literary competition sponsored by BP, and he is the author of five subsequent well-received novels, including the Commonwealth Writers' Prize-winning Salt (1996) and, more recently, Is Just a Movie, winner of the 2012 OCM Bocas Prize for Caribbean Literature. He has also written drama, essays, short stories and children's books. The artist Che Lovelace is his son.

== Biography ==
Born in Toco, Trinidad and Tobago, Earl Lovelace was sent to live with his grandparents in Tobago at a very young age but rejoined his family in Toco when he was 11 years old. His family later moved to Belmont, Port-of-Spain, Trinidad, and then Morvant. Lovelace attended Scarborough Methodist Primary School, Scarborough, Tobago (1940–47), Nelson Street Boys' R.C., Port of Spain (1948), and Ideal High School, Port of Spain (1948–53, where he sat the Cambridge School Certificate).

He worked at the Trinidad Guardian as a proofreader from 1953 to 1954, and then for the Department of Forestry (1954–56) and the Ministry of Agriculture (1956–66). He began writing while stationed in the village of Valencia, in north-eastern Trinidad, as a forest ranger. He also had a posting as Agricultural Officer in Rio Claro in the south-east of the island. As Kenneth Ramchand has noted, "In the rural context [Lovelace] attended stick fights, wakes, village festivals and dances. He played cricket and football, and gambled in the rum shop with the villagers. He joined up to take part in the Best Village Competitions. He was living among ordinary people as one of them, and as an artist observing."

In 1962 his first novel, While Gods Are Falling, won the Trinidad and Tobago Independence literary competition sponsored by BP, after which he spent two years in Tobago, marrying in April 1964. While Gods Are Falling would be published in Britain by Collins in 1965.

From 1966 to 1967, Lovelace studied at Howard University, Washington, DC, and in 1974 he received an MA in English from Johns Hopkins University, Baltimore, Maryland, where he was also Visiting Novelist.

He taught at Federal City College (now University of the District of Columbia), Washington, DC (1971–73), and from 1977 to 1987 he lectured in literature and creative writing at the University of the West Indies at St Augustine. Winning a Guggenheim Fellowship in 1980, he spent the year as a visiting writer at the International Writing Program at the University of Iowa.

He was appointed Writer-in-Residence in England by the London Arts Board (1995–96), a visiting lecturer in the Africana Studies Department at Wellesley College, Massachusetts (1996–97), and was Distinguished Novelist in the Department of English at Pacific Lutheran University, Tacoma, Washington (1999–2004).

Lovelace was Trinidad and Tobago's artistic director for Carifesta, the Caribbean Festival of Arts, which was held in the country in 1992, 1995 and 2006.

He is a columnist for the Trinidad Express, and has contributed to a number of periodicals, including Voices, South, and Wasafiri. Based in Trinidad, while teaching and touring various countries, he was appointed to the Board of Governors of the University of Trinidad and Tobago in 2005, the year his 70th birthday was honoured with a conference and celebrations at the University of the West Indies. He is the president of the Association of Caribbean Writers.

Lovelace is the subject of a 2014 documentary film by Funso Aiyejina entitled A Writer In His Place.

In July 2015, to mark his 80th birthday, Lovelace was honoured by the NGC Bocas Lit Fest with celebrations in Tobago, including film screenings.

He is the subject of a 2017 biography by Funso Aiyejina.

The Earl Lovelace Short Fiction Award was established in 2022 by Nigerian writer and publisher Onyeka Nwelue, administered by Abibiman Publishing, "in honour of the most important writer from the Caribbean".

== Writing ==
At the same time as his writing has brought him international prestige and awards, "Lovelace has been valued by readers in his own country for his story-telling, for the vividness of his characters, for the ease and energy of his language, for his celebration of the creole or island-born culture, and for the way his writing makes people feel good about the selves they see in the mirror of his art."

When Lovelace's first novel, While Gods Are Falling, was published in 1965, C. L. R. James hailed "a new type of writer, a new type of prose, a different type of work".

In 1968, Lovelace published his second novel, The Schoolmaster, for which "he invented a language to represent the people of Kumaca, a remote Spanish Creole village of timbered hills, fertile valleys and clear cool rivers that comes breathtakingly alive in Lovelace’s descriptive prose. ... The Schoolmaster can be read as a celebration of the natural world and the attuned people in it; as a parable about the perils of transition from small island to modern nation; and most obviously as a satire about education in a colonial context."

Lovelace's 1979 novel, The Dragon Can't Dance, has been described as "a defining and luminously sensitive portrait of postcolonial island life. ...A poignant, beautifully crafted tale about a man and his country on the cusp of change." Considered his best-known work, The Dragon Can't Dance is "a wildly exuberant paean to Trinidad’s carnival traditions and the calypsonians who challenged British rule in the wake of the second world war."

In 1982, Lovelace published the novel The Wine of Astonishment, which deals with the struggle of a Spiritual Baptist community, from the passing of the prohibition ordinance until the ban, the story "animated by a Creole narrative voice" as in other work by Lovelace.

Summing up his 1996 novel, Salt, the review in Publishers Weekly said: "Using language that's as lush as the foliage of Trinidad and dialogue as vivid as the Caribbean, Lovelace creates a parable that applies to any nation struggling with unresolved racial issues and to any people struggling to free themselves from their past." Salt won the Commonwealth Writers' Prize (Overall Winner, Best Book) and was shortlisted for the 1998 International Dublin Literary Award. In 2010, Salt was included on a list of 10 titles chosen by novelist Nadifa Mohamed, publisher and journalist Margaret Busby and editor Ellah Allfrey to make up "an alternative literary canon", diverse not only culturally and historically, but generically, the other books featured being: Banjo by Claude Mckay, The Black Jacobins by C. L. R. James, Under Milk Wood by Dylan Thomas, The Murderer by Roy Heath, Waiting for the Wild Beasts to Vote by Ahmadou Kourouma, Song of Lawino by Okot p'Bitek, Kindred by Octavia Butler, House of Hunger by Dambudzo Marechera and Half of a Yellow Sun by Chimamanda Ngozi Adichie.

In 2011, Lovelace's Is Just a Movie was published by Faber and Faber. Hailing it as "something of an event", coming 15 years after his previous novel, Bernardine Evaristo wrote in The Guardian: "Lovelace is unusual among celebrated Caribbean writers in that he has always lived in Trinidad. Most writers leave to find support for their literary endeavours elsewhere and this, arguably, shapes the literature, especially after long periods of exile. But Lovelace's fiction is deeply embedded in Trinidadian society and is written from the perspective of one whose ties to his homeland have never been broken. In his new novel, he turns his attention to the remote fictional village of Cascadu and the lives of ordinary individuals whose relationship to politics, their peers and their own weaknesses provide fascinating material." Considered by the Financial Times reviewer to be a novel that "confirms Lovelace as a master storyteller of the West Indies", Is Just a Movie won the 2012 OCM Bocas Prize for Caribbean Literature.

Lovelace has also written plays (some collected in Jestina's Calypso and Other Plays, 1984), short stories (collected in A Brief Conversion and Other Stories, 1988), essays, and a children's book, as well as journalism.

=== Papers ===
The Alma Jordan Library at the University of the West Indies, St Augustine, holds the Earl Lovelace manuscripts. The papers mainly consist of typed and handwritten notes, drafts and manuscripts of Lovelace's published output — novels, plays and short stories. Manuscripts of the following novels are included: The Schoolmaster; The Dragon Can't Dance; While Gods are Falling; The Wine of Astonishment; Salt. The collection also includes some unpublished work, including poetry.

== Family ==
His artist son Che Lovelace illustrated the jacket of the 1997 US edition of his novel Salt. Earl Lovelace has collaborated with his filmmaker daughter Asha Lovelace on projects including writing the 2004 feature film Joebell and America, based on his short story of the same title from A Brief Conversion, on which his son Walt Lovelace was the director of photography and editor, and Che was the art director. Lovelace's daughter Maya Cross-Lovelace, whose mother was the late environmentalist Robyn Cross, is also an artist.

== Awards and recognition ==
- 1963, British Petroleum Independence Award, 1963, for While Gods Are Falling.
- 1966, Pegasus Literary Award, for outstanding contributions to the arts in Trinidad and Tobago.
- 1977, awards for best play and best music for Pierrot Ginnard.
- 1980, Guggenheim fellowship.
- 1985, Jestina's Calypso voted the most original play at the Trinidad & Tobago Drama Festival.
- 1986, National Endowment for the Humanities grant.
- 1988, Chaconia Medal (Gold) from the government of Trinidad & Tobago.
- 1997, Best Book, Commonwealth Writers' Prize (Overall Winner, Best Book), 1997, for Salt.
- 1998, Shortlist, International Dublin Literary Award for Salt.
- 2002, Honorary Doctorate of Letters from the University of the West Indies, St Augustine, Trinidad & Tobago, 2002.
- 2011, Grand Prize for Caribbean Literature, from Regional Council of Guadeloupe, for Is Just a Movie.
- 2012, OCM Bocas Prize for Caribbean Literature for Is Just a Movie (winner of Fiction category and overall winner).
- 2012, Caribbean-Canadian Literary Award.
- 2012, Lifetime Literary Award from the National Library and Information System (Nalis), Trinidad.
- 2018, Presidents Award, St. Martin Book Fair.

== Selected works ==
=== Novels ===
- While Gods Are Falling, London: Collins, 1965; Chicago, Illinois: Regnery, 1966.
- The Schoolmaster, London: Collins, 1968.
- The Dragon Can't Dance, London: André Deutsch, 1979. Faber & Faber, 1998.
- The Wine of Astonishment, London: André Deutsch, 1982. Oxford: Heinemann Educational Books, Caribbean Writers Series (1983); 2010 edition includes CSEC-specific study notes. ISBN 978-0-435-03340-8.
- Salt (winner of 1997 Commonwealth Writers' Prize; International Dublin Literary Award shortlist 1998), London: Faber & Faber, 1996; New York: Persea Books, 1997.
- Is Just a Movie (winner of 2012 OCM Bocas Prize for Caribbean Literature), London: Faber & Faber, January 2011. ISBN 0-571-25567-1.

=== Short-story collection ===
- A Brief Conversion and Other Stories, Oxford: Heinemann, 1988.

=== Play collection ===
- Jestina's Calypso and Other Plays, Oxford: Heinemann, 1984.

=== Essay collection ===
- Growing in the Dark. Selected Essays (ed. Funso Aiyejina; San Juan, Trinidad: Lexicon Trinidad, 2003).

=== Plays and musicals ===
- The New Boss, 1962.
- My Name Is Village, produced in Port of Spain, Trinidad, at Queen's Hall, 1976.
- Pierrot Ginnard (musical drama), produced in Port of Spain, Trinidad, at Queen's Hall, 1977.
- Jestina's Calypso, produced in St Augustine, Trinidad, at the University of the West Indies, 1978.
- The Wine of Astonishment (adapted from his novel), performed in Port of Spain, Trinidad; Barbados, 1987.
- The New Hardware Store, produced at the University of the West Indies, 1980. Produced in London, England, by Talawa Theatre Company, at the Arts Theatre, 1985.
- The Dragon Can't Dance (adapted from his novel), produced in Port of Spain, Trinidad, at Queen's Hall, 1986. Published in Black Plays: 2, ed. Yvonne Brewster, London: Methuen, 1989. Produced in London at Theatre Royal Stratford East, by Talawa Theatre Company, with music by Andre Tanker, 29 June – 4 August 1990.
- The Reign of Anancy, performed in Port of Spain, Trinidad, 1989.
- Joebell and America, produced in Lupinot Village, Trinidad, 1999.

=== Other ===
- Crawfie the Crapaud (for children), Longman, 1998.
- George and the Bicycle Pump (also known as Jorge y la bomba; 2000, film directed by Asha Lovelace, based on Earl Lovelace's short story in A Brief Conversion and Other Stories).
- Joebell and America (film, co-written with and directed by Asha Lovelace; Trinidad: Caribbean Communications Network, premiered TV6, Trinidad, 2004).

=== As editor ===
- With Robert Antoni, Trinidad Noir: The Classics, Akashic Books, 2017, ISBN 978-1-61775-435-7.

== See also ==
- Caribbean literature
- Postcolonial literature

== Interviews and profiles ==
- Sophie Megan Harris, "An Interview with Earl Lovelace" (14 and 24 June 2011), SX Salon, Small Axe, 28 May 2012.
- Kelly Hewson, "An Interview with Earl Lovelace, June 2003", Postcolonial Text, Vol. 1, No. 1 (2004).
- Mario Laarmann, "'“Let me see how we could heal this to start again at another level of life'". An Interview with Earl Lovelace, Part 1. SX Salon, February 2024.
- Mario Laarmann, "'I never looked down—I looked across!'". An Interview with Earl Lovelace, Part 2. SX Salon, February 2024.
- B.C. Pires, "We are on the verge of listening". Earl Lovelace talks to B.C. Pires. Caribbean Review of Books, January 2011.
- Raquel Puig, "The Meandering Mind and the Film Image: Interview with Earl Lovelace", Sargasso: Celebrating Caribbean Voices 2010–2011, Special Issue.
- Patricia J. Saunders, "The Meeting Place of Creole Culture: A Conversation with Earl Lovelace". Calabash: A Journal of Caribbean Arts and Letters, New York University.
- Anderson Tepper, "A Badjohn in Harlem: An Afternoon with Earl Lovelace", The Paris Review, 11 April 2012.
