= List of museums in Trinidad and Tobago =

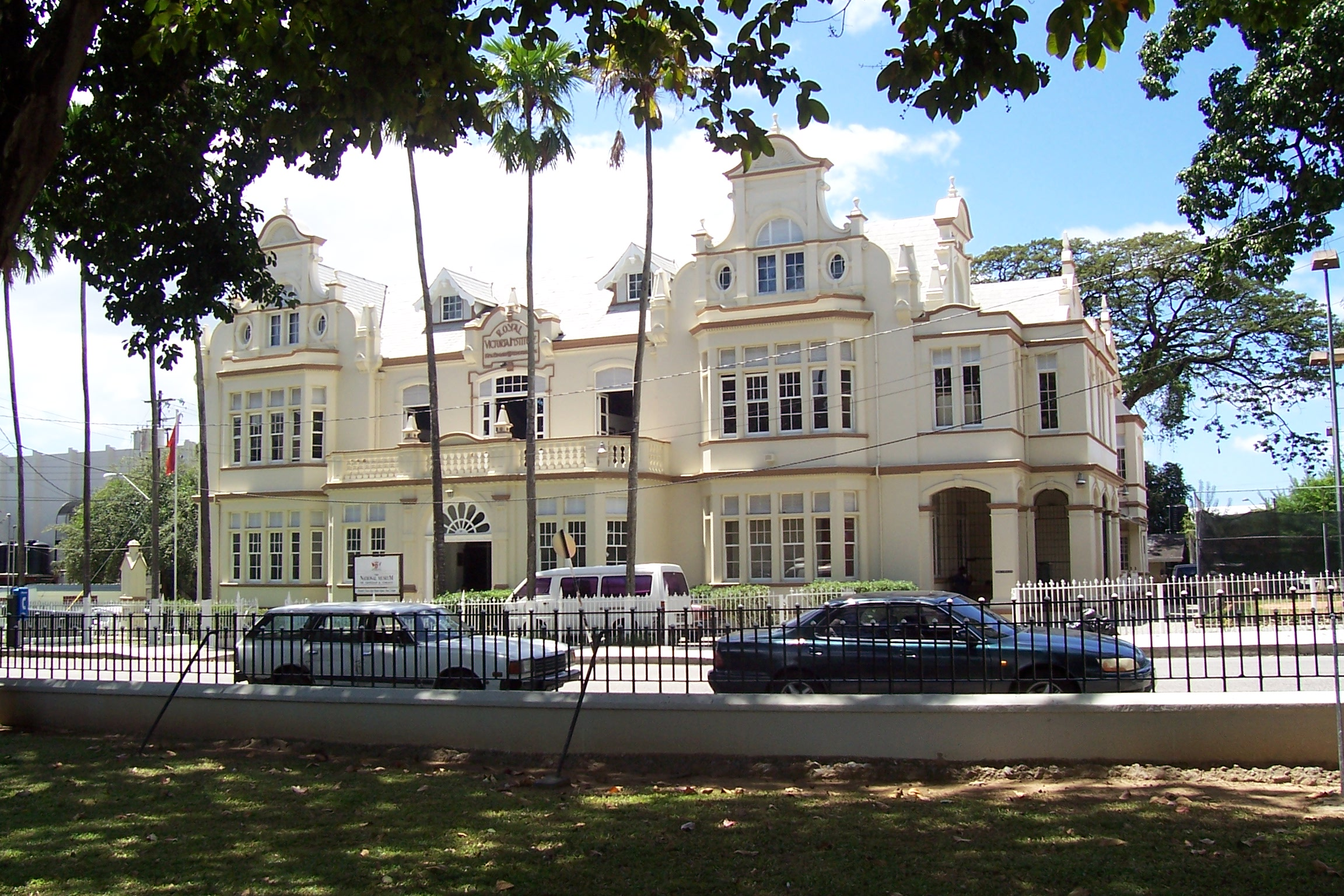
National Museum

This is a list of museums in Trinidad and Tobago.

- Tobago Heritage Conservation Society |url=https://www.tripadvisor.com/Museum
- Museum Buccoo Tobago colonial history 1628-1860
- Angostura Museum & the Barcant Butterfly Collection
- Brij Maharaj Auto & Heritage Museum
- Carnival Museum of Trinidad and Tobago, Charlotte Street, Port of Spain
- Chaguaramas Military Museum
- Geneis Nature Park & Art Gallery
- Hummingbird Gallery
- Indian Caribbean Museum of Trinidad and Tobago
- Luise Kimme Museum
- Money Museum, Central Bank, Eric Williams Financial Plaza, Independence Square, Port of Spain
- Moruga Museum
- Mud House Museum, Avocat Village, Trinidad
- Mundo Nuevo Museum, Tamana Mountain Chocolate, Mundo Nuevo, Trinidad
- Museum of the City of Port of Spain, Fort San Andrés on South Quay, Port of Spain
- Museum of the Police Service of Trinidad and Tobago, Police Headquarters, St Vincent Street, Port of Spain
- Museum of Tobago History
- National Museum and Art Gallery, Port of Spain
- Parliamentary Museum of Trinidad and Tobago, Port of Spain
- Tobago Historical Museum.
- Toco Folk Museum
- The Tobago Museum
- Trinidad and Tobago Carnival Museum.
- National Museum and Art Gallery of Trinidad and Tobago
- Zoology Museum of The University of the West Indies

== See also ==
- List of museums by country
