= Che Lovelace =

Trinidadian artist (born 1969)

- Born: Cheikh Sedar Lovelace; 1969 (age 55–56); San Fernando, Trinidad
- Education: Queen's Royal College; L'Ecole Régionale des Beaux-Arts de la Martinique
- Occupation: Artist
- Relatives: Earl Lovelace (father)

Che Lovelace (born 1969) is a Trinidadian artist who lives and works in Port of Spain, Trinidad. He first came to prominence as a champion surfer and was appointed president of Trinidad's Surfing Association in 2012. He has contributed to many art, Carnival and entertainment projects, including the weekly Studiofilmclub, founded in 2003 with Peter Doig. Lovelace is currently a lecturer at the University of the West Indies Creative Arts Campus. He is the son of novelist Earl Lovelace.

== Biography ==
Che Lovelace was born in San Fernando, Trinidad, and grew up in the east coast village of Matura. He has said: "My 'passport' name is Cheikh Sedar Lovelace. Apparently, in 1969, the Anglican Church would not allow me to be christened Che. My parents made my first name Cheikh after the African historian-philosopher, Cheikh Anta Diop. I believe Sedar is after the Senegalese poet Léopold Sédar Senghor. Why they set me up to live up to the standard of such great men, I couldn't tell you." Lovelace began surfing in his late teens and achieved prominence through winning national titles in the sport. He was educated at Queen's Royal College, and went on to pursue his interest in art and to train at L'Ecole Régionale des Beaux-Arts de la Martinique in Fort-de-France.

Working as an artist since he graduated in 1993, Lovelace has experimented with various styles and materials, exploring in his subject matter dancehall, Carnival and dancing figures. In 1998, he was awarded a residency at the Gasworks Gallery, London, in a collaboration with the Institute of International Visual Arts (Iniva), UNESCO's International Fund for the Promotion of Culture, and the Gasworks Studios.

Having been a founder and director of CLAY J'Ouvert, a traditional carnival outfit based in Woodbrook, Port of Spain, Lovelace has gone on to develop with other J'ouvert lovers the "Friends For The Road J'Ouvert" project, honouring the ritual "Mud Mas" experience and featuring traditional masquerade characters.

In 2003, together with Peter Doig, Lovelace co-founded the alternative cinema space Studiofilmclub. Lovelace also lectures at the University of the West Indies Creative Arts Campus.

In 2017, The New Yorker noted: "Poised on the border between Cubism and realism, Lovelace doesn't really belong to any school; part of the beauty of the show lies in watching the artist establish his own rich vocabulary and letting the work stand on its own. He's not afraid of pleasure and knows how much the soul craves color—a refuge during these dark days." Reviewing Lovelace's first exhibition in France in 2017, Le Figaro said that his use of landscape and bright colour recalled that of Gauguin and Matisse.

In a 2018 interview, Lovelace said: "I've seen the landscape in a variety of ways–as a surfer, as a country man growing up in Matura, as an artist in the city, as a participator in cultural events. So I always want my work to reflect that." He has also said: "I'm not really settled unless I'm trying new things with my work. I'm always pushing to the next thing."

Lovelace's work was shown in 2021 at the gallery Various Small Fires in Los Angeles, his second solo show in the United States. His other more recent exhibitions have been Bathers (Nicola Vassell, New York, 2023) and Day Always Comes (Corvi-Mora, London, 2023).

In 2023, after a selection process led by curator Ekow Eshun, Lovelace was commissioned to create a new artwork to commemorate the 250th anniversary of the baptism of African abolitionist Ottobah Cugoano at St James's, Piccadilly, to be installed in the church entrance on 20 September 2023 – the first permanent artwork anywhere in the world to commemorate Cugoano. As described in The Guardian, "Lovelace's work is infused with rich colours and bold shapes and straddles the boundary between magical realism, abstraction and the beauty of the natural world." On 22 September, Lovelace was in conversation about his paintings with Rector of St James's Lucy Winkett.

== Honours and recognition ==
In April 2025, Lovelace was appointed Chevalier de L'Ordre des Arts et des Lettres (Knight of the Order of Arts and Letters), an honour awarded by the French government, which was presented to him at the Embassy of France in Trinidad and Tobago, in recognition of his "exceptional contributions to the arts and his pivotal role in bringing Caribbean visual expression to the global forefront."

== Selected solo exhibitions ==
- 2013: Lovers, Y Art Gallery, Woodbrook, Port of Spain
- 2016: 8 Paintings, Softbox Studio, St Clair, Trinidad
- 2017: Galerie Éric Hussenot, Paris
- 2017: Paintings, Half Gallery, New York
- 2018: Recent painting, LOFTT Gallery, Port of Spain (20 July–10 August)
- 2019: a PLACE, a PERSON, LOFTT Gallery, Port of Spain (15 November–29 November)
- 2021: From the Edge of the Rock, Various Small Fires (VSF), Los Angeles (6 March–17 April)
- 2022: Presented as Natural, Various Small Fires, Seoul (12 January–16 February 2022)
- 2003: Bathers, Nicola Vassell, New York (9 March–22 April 2023)
- 2023: Day Always Comes, Corvi-Mora, London (28 April–4 June 2023)
- 2025: Yankee Gone, Corvi-Mora, London (8 October–20 December 2025)

== Work in collections ==
In 2021, Lovelace's painting "Nyabinghi Drummers" was acquired by the Museum of Contemporary Art, Los Angeles.
