= St Ann's, Trinidad and Tobago =

Suburb of Port of Spain, Trinidad and Tobago

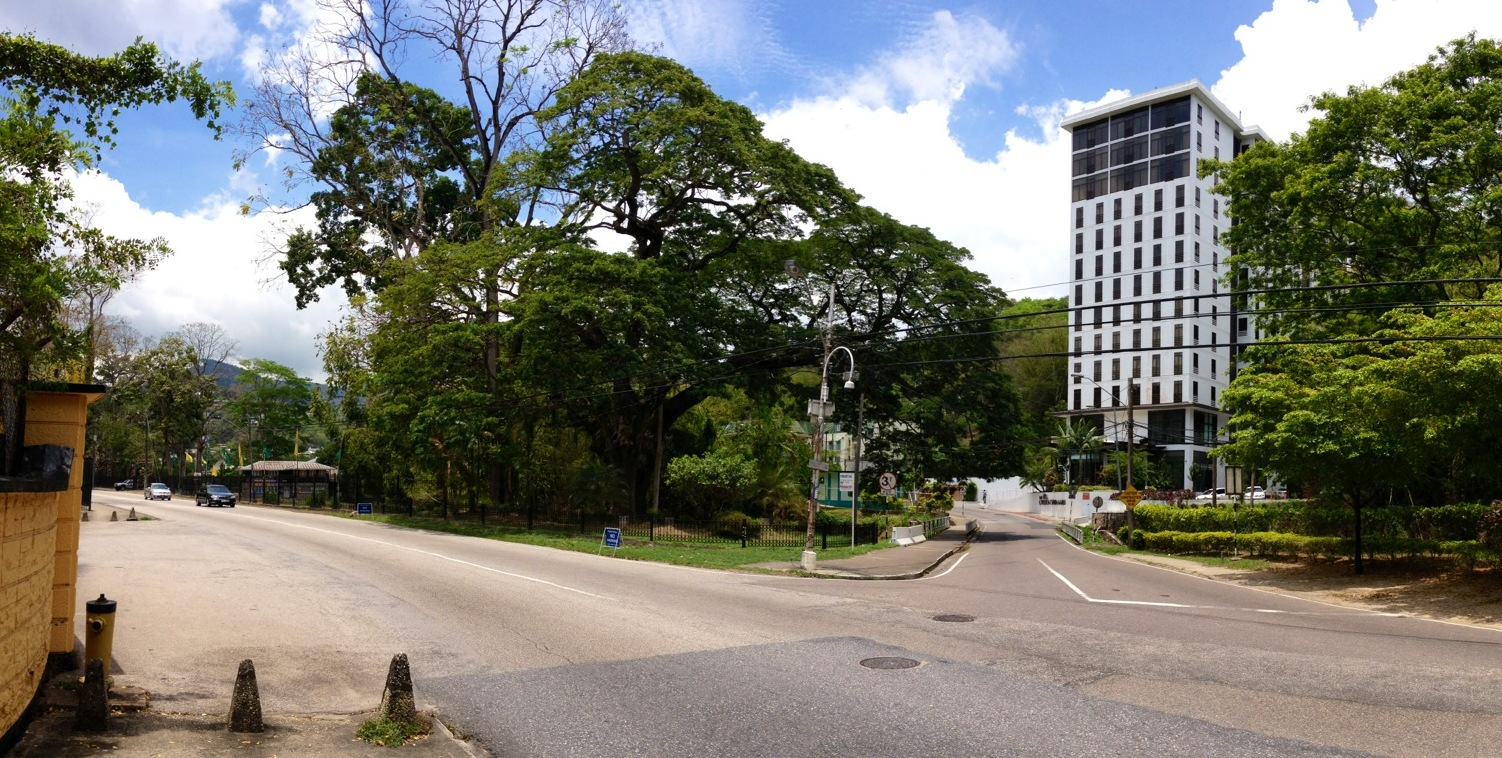
- St Ann's Road
- Interactive map of St Ann's, Trinidad and Tobago
- Coordinates: 10°40′35.76″N 61°30′21.96″W

St Ann's is a town in Trinidad and Tobago. It is a northern suburb of the capital city Port of Spain.

== History ==
In 2017, conservationist Claire Broadbridge was murdered at her home in St Ann's during a home invasion.

== Notable buildings ==
- President's House

== Politics ==
St Ann's is divided by two constituencies for elections to the Parliament of Trinidad and Tobago; Saint Ann's East and Port of Spain North/Saint Ann's West.

== See also ==
- List of cities and towns in Trinidad and Tobago
