= Stanley Nyamfukudza =

Zimbabwean writer (born 1951)

Stanley Nyamfukudza (born 1951) is a Zimbabwean writer.

== Biography ==
He was born in Wedza District, Zimbabwe. In 1973, he was ejected from Salisbury University for participation in student riots against racism on the campus. From there, he moved to England where he was awarded a scholarship to study literature at the University of Oxford and completed a degree in English. He returned to an independent Zimbabwe in 1980.

Nyamfukudza has become one of Zimbabwe's longest established writers. His 1980 work The Non-believer's Journey focuses on the war of liberation against colonialism. Since then, he has published two collections of short stories: Aftermaths in 1980 and If God was a Woman in 1991. He presented the plenary speech, titled "Reflections on Zimbabwe’s intellectual development", at the 2004 Nordic Africa Institute conference.

== Bibliography ==
- If God Was a Woman (1991)
- Aftermaths (1983)
- The Non-believer's Journey (1980)
