= The Wine of Astonishment =

1982 novel by Earl Lovelace

- Author: Earl Lovelace
- Language: English
- Genre: Fiction
- Publisher: Andre Deutsch Ltd
- Publication date: 1982
- Preceded by: The Dragon Can't Dance
- Followed by: Salt

The Wine of Astonishment is a 1982 novel written by Trinidadian author Earl Lovelace. The story depicts the struggles of a Spiritual Baptist community from the passing of the Prohibition Ordinance to repealing of the ban, portraying a 20-year struggle from 1932 to 1951. Themes such as racism, women in society, religion, change, oppression, power and authority are featured throughout the book.

== Plot summary ==
This story is narrated by Eva Dorcas. She and her husband, Bee Dorcas are a religious couple who are both members of the Spiritual Baptist Church in a small Trinidadian community known as Bonasse. They all share their experiences about being persecuted due to their direct affiliation with their religion. They also share how they were betrayed by someone to whom they entrusted their faith for a change. Trust became an issue for the fellow characters since Ivan Morton betrayed them when he entered into the political life and evacuated the house his father built on his own to live in a colonial-era mansion, located on top of the Bonasse hill, that was once occupied by an English family known as the Richardsons. The community praised Bolo for his masculinity in defending his fellow neighbours until he was taken to prison. After his release he was no longer the person he once was, of which the community now fear.

== Main characters ==
- Bee Dorcas: Eva Dorcas' husband, a father to five children, installed as Shouter Baptist church's pastor and believed to be a strong Christian. The entire community admired Bee, and considered him as the pillar of the community due to his wisdom and patience. He loved being appreciated and knew how manage his responsibilities in a professionalized manner without converting it into a burden. Bee eventually becomes aware of that repression occurring upon losing the respect of his children and the disintegration of the church. Bee shows his anger when he breaks the law and deals with the consequences.
- Eva Dorcas: Bee's wife and mother of his five children. Eva is characterized as an emotional supporter for her husband and believed to be a strong Christian follower just as her husband. Known to be the narrator and explained every aspect of everyone's life in details.
- Ivan Morton: once a teacher before he became affiliated with politics. He was known as the new individual within the country's legislative council, but brought disappointment when he broke his promise to help lift the ban. He was known to be the "bright" person in the community even though he had failed his college examination not only once but twice.
- Bolo: known as the best of all stick fighters in the community and was crowned as champion. With such emphasis, the community viewed him as a hero and a warrior figure. He was later imprisoned for defending both his mother and the church. The imprisonment had changed his well-being from the most loved individual to the terror of the community after a year.

== Major themes and symbolism ==
Shouter Baptists or Spiritual Baptists observe a combination of Christianity and African traditional practices. Conflict arose between the British colonial government and citizens of Trinidad because Christianity has a direct link with the British authorities and Shouter Baptist was a form of rivalry in the eyes of the colonial government, since Trinidad was then a colony of the British Empire. This conflict resulted in the passing of Shouter Prohibition Ordinance in 1917.

The betrayal of Ivan Morton results in a dramatic change within the lives and faith of the community, emphasizing the toll that power and authority takes on someone's personality. Ivan Morton became the main disappointment when he decided not to support the Shouter Baptist religion and followed the colonizers' orders. Politics in this community is a depiction of the various characteristics of Caribbean political leadership. Members of the community connected their faith with their daily lives by reciting Bible verses throughout the novel depicting religion as a major theme.

The Shouter Baptist Church symbolizes unity and a form of identity. Members of the community adore the church and claim it is the foundation of their tradition, a connection with their ancestors who were slaves.
