= Dambudzo Marechera =

Zimbabwean writer (1952–1987)

- Born: Charles William Marechera; 4 June 1952; Rusape, Southern Rhodesia
- Died: 18 August 1987 (aged 35); Harare, Zimbabwe
- Education: University of Rhodesia (now University of Zimbabwe), University of Oxford
- Occupation: Writer
- Notable work: The House of Hunger (1978), Black Sunlight (1980)
- Awards: Guardian Fiction Prize (1979)

Dambudzo Marechera (4 June 1952 – 18 August 1987) was a Zimbabwean novelist, short story writer, playwright, and poet. His short career produced a book of stories, two novels (one published posthumously), a book of plays, prose, and poetry, and a collection of poetry (also posthumous). His first book, a fiction collection entitled The House of Hunger (1978), won the Guardian Fiction Prize in 1979. Marechera was best known for his abrasive, heavily detailed, and self-aware writing, which was considered a new frontier in African literature, and his unorthodox behaviour at the universities from which he was expelled despite excelling in his studies.

== Early life and education ==
Marechera was born on 4 June 1952 in Vengere Township, Rusape, Southern Rhodesia, to Isaac Marechera, a mortuary attendant, and Masvotwa Venenzia Marechera, a maid. He was the child of Shona parents from the eastern-central part of Rhodesia.

He grew up amid racial discrimination, poverty, and violence. He attended St. Augustine's Mission, Penhalonga, where he clashed with his teachers over the colonial teaching syllabus, and he went on to the University of Rhodesia (now University of Zimbabwe), from which he was expelled during student unrest, and New College, Oxford, where his unsociable behaviour and academic dereliction led to another expulsion.

== Trouble and success in England ==
At the University of Oxford, Marechera struck his professors as a very intelligent but rather anarchic student who had no particular interest in adhering to course syllabi, choosing rather to read whatever struck his fancy. He also had a reputation for being a quarrelsome young man who did not hesitate to fight his antagonists physically, especially in the pubs around Oxford. He began to display erratic behaviour, which the school psychologist diagnosed as schizophrenia. Marechera threatened to murder certain people and attempted to set the university on fire. He was also famous — or notorious — for having no respect for authority derived from notions of racial or class superiority. For trying to set the college on fire, Marechera was given two options: either to submit to a psychiatric examination or be sent down; he chose the latter, charging that they were mentally raping him.

At this point, Marechera's life became troubled, even landing him in Cardiff Prison in 1977 for possession of marijuana, and a decision regarding his deportation. He joined the rootless communities around Oxford and other places, sleeping in friends' sitting-rooms and writing various fictional and poetic pieces on park benches and being regularly mugged by thugs and harassed by the police for vagrancy. During this period, he also lived for many months in the squatting community at Tolmers Square in central London.

=== Publication ===
Marechera's first book and magnum opus, The House of Hunger (1978) – a collection of one novella and nine satellite short stories – came immediately after his largely disappointing time at New College, Oxford. The House of Hunger was taken on by James Currey at Heinemann and published in their African Writers Series. The book's long title story describes the narrator's troubled childhood and youth in colonial Rhodesia.

The House of Hunger was awarded the 1979 Guardian Fiction Prize. Marechera was the first and the only African to have won the award in its 33 years, and he became a celebrity in the literary circles of England. However, he constantly caused outrage. At the buffet dinner for the award of the Guardian Fiction Prize, in a tantrum Marechera began to launch plates at a chandelier. Nevertheless, Leeds University and the University of Sheffield offered him positions as a writer-in-residence.

Marechera thought the British publishing establishment was ripping him off, so he resorted to raiding the Heinemann offices at odd times to ask for his royalties. Still, he lived in dire poverty and his physical health suffered greatly because he did not eat enough and drank too much. Friends, fellow Zimbabwean students such as poet Musaemura Zimunya, Rino Zhuwarara, writer Stanley Nyamfukudza, and mere casual friends were all suspected by Marechera of being involved in his many troubles even when they acted in good faith. In the end he hung around with the down-and-outs who lived on the fringes of the literary establishment, barging into parties and generally getting into trouble and more than once, being bailed out by Currey. He was regularly thrown out of the Africa Centre, the cultural meeting-place in London's Covent Garden for African and Afrocentric scholars and students.

Some accounts suggest that Marechera married a British woman but not much is known about the union.

Marechera's 1980 experimental novel Black Sunlight has been compared with the writing of James Joyce and Henry Miller, but it did not achieve the critical success of The House of Hunger. It explores the idea of anarchism as a formal intellectual position.

== Return to Zimbabwe and final years ==
Marechera returned to the newly independent Zimbabwe in 1982 to assist in shooting the film of The House of Hunger. However, he fell out with the director and remained behind in Zimbabwe when the crew left, leading a homeless existence in Harare before his death there five years later in 1987, from an AIDS-related pneumonia, aged 35.

Mindblast; or, The Definitive Buddy (1984) was written the year after his return home and comprises three plays, a prose narrative, a collection of poems, and a park-bench diary. The book criticises the materialism, intolerance, opportunism, and corruption of post-independence Zimbabwe.

The Black Insider, posthumously published in 1990, is set in a faculty of arts building that offers refuge for a group of intellectuals and artists from an unspecified war outside, which subsequently engulfs them as well. The conversation of the characters centres on African identity and the nature of art.

Marechera's poetry was published posthumously under the title Cemetery of Mind (1992).

== Awards ==
- 1979: Guardian Fiction Prize

== Legacy ==
Since Marechera's death, dozens of younger writers and many of his colleagues have written numerous accounts and biographies detailing his troubled life and works. In the 1990s, the most prominent were foreigners, especially the German scholar Flora Veit-Wild, who has written both a biography and a sourcebook of Marechera's life and works. However, she took many of the things she got from Marechera as facts. In an article in Wasafiri magazine in March 2012, Wild replied to the question about why she "did not write a proper Dambudzo Marechera biography" by saying: "My answer was that I did not want to collapse his multi-faceted personality into one authoritative narrative but rather let the diverse voices speak for themselves. But this is not the whole truth. I could not write his life story because my own life was so intricately entangled with his." She then described in detail her intimate relationship with him over an 18-month period.

Ainehi Edoro of Brittle Paper wrote in 2015: "today, Marechera is an icon for experimental fiction and cultural rebellion in African literature."

New Zealand poet, editor, critic and publisher Mark Pirie has written on Marechera and featured his work in the literary journal JAAM (Just Another Art Movement).

== Bibliography ==
- 1978: The House of Hunger, Heinemann African Writers Series
- 1980: Black Sunlight
- 1984: Mindblast or The Definitive Buddy
- 1992: The Black Insider
- 1992: Cemetery of Mind
- 1994: Scrapiron Blues
