= The Dragon Can't Dance =

1979 novel by Earl Lovelace

- First edition
- Author: Earl Lovelace
- Language: English
- Genre: Fiction
- Publisher: André Deutsch
- Publication date: 1979
- Publication place: Trinidad and Tobago
- Preceded by: The Schoolmaster
- Followed by: The Wine of Astonishment

The Dragon Can't Dance (1979) is a novel by Trinidadian author Earl Lovelace, his third to be published. Set in Port of Spain, the novel centres on the life of Aldrick Prospect, a man who spends the entire year recreating his dragon costume for Carnival. Aldrick's interactions with other people who live in his neighbourhood (including Fisheye, a local hoodlum, and Pariag, a rural Indian who moves to the city to get away from his familial heritage) form the backdrop for their individual struggles for self-definition in a society dominated by its racial divisions and colonial legacies. The story culminates with Aldrick and Fisheye, along with a small number of followers, hijacking a police van and taking two police officers hostage. The events surrounding the hostage-taking, and the aftermath of the event, lead the reader on a journey through the colonial psyche, and expose the deep-seated problems of a society that still has not reconciled itself with its colonial past and racial divisions.

== Characters ==
- Aldrick, main protagonist, embodies "the dragon"
- Sylvia, love interest of the Hill, represents youth and sexuality
- Belasco "Fisheye" John, the "bad-john" of the Hill
- Pariag, the Indian, represents racial discrimination and exclusion
- Philo, original member of the Band, becomes a rich Calypso singer
- Ms. Cleothilda, "Queen" of the hill, Philo's love interest
- Ms. Olive, Sylvia's mother
- Mr. Guy, Sylvia's boyfriend
- Dolly, Pariag's wife
- Ms. Caroline

== Historical context ==
Recorded history of Trinidad began when Christopher Columbus arrived on 31 July 1498. Trinidad was inhabited by Amerindian peoples of the Arawak group, who had lived there for many centuries, and by Island Caribs who had begun to raid the island long before 1498 and had established settlements by the end of the sixteenth century. After its discovery by Columbus the Spanish began to settle on the island and the production of tobacco and cocoa began during the seventeenth century, but because they lacked the essentials for economic development and shipping, the capacity to develop a productive base was crippled; Spain failed to develop the productive industrial and commercial base necessary to maintain an empire.

"By 1783, the Spanish government had recognized that French planters, with their slaves, capital and expertise in the cultivation of tropical staples, would have to be attracted if Trinidad was to develop as a plantation colony. The result of this conviction was the Cedula (Decree) of Population, issued on 24 November 1783. The principal incentive that the Cedula offered was a free grant of land to every settler who came to Trinidad with his slaves with two stipulations: the emigrant had to be a Roman Catholic and the subject of a nation friendly to Spain. This meant that the settlers would be almost exclusively French for only French planters could fulfil the requirements of Roman Catholicism and alliance with Spain", thus a large French and slave population began to immigrate to Trinidad and the island's economy began to flourish.

Sugar quickly became Trinidad's most important crop, and as the sugar industry boomed, so did the Atlantic slave trade, bringing even more enslaved Africans to the island. This greatly affected the dominant culture of Trinidad. Creole culture became the norm of the black community and French influence could be seen in dress, music, and dance.

"Along with the immigration of diverse cultural communities came more stratified social hierarchies. As early as 1779, Roume de St Laurent held the office of alcalde extraordinario of the cabildo. Those who sat on the cabildo, were without exception wealthy white land-owners and slave-holders whose politics were royalist and conservative, men committed to the preservation of slavery and white ascendancy." The cabildo became known as the ruling elite class of Trinidad.

"By the 1790s British merchants had conducted a flourishing trade with Trinidad. Its geographical position made it an ideal base, which guaranteed that Trinidad would be safe from the British Navy."

"In July 1795 a peace treaty between Spain and Republican France was signed, making Spain (and in turn the colony of Trinidad) to be firmly allied with France. Then, in October 1796, the French government succeeded in forcing Spain to declare war Britain which meant that Trinidad was now exposed to the British navy." With an ill-equipped military, Spain surrendered Trinidad on 18 February 1797, making the island a colony of Britain.

"Britain continued to import slaves to work the sugar plantations into the 1800s although anti-slavery campaigns were beginning to gain popularity in England. In 1807, Britain saw the abolition of the British slave trade, though the colony continued to use slave labour to work the plantations. It was not until 1833 that the Act of Emancipation was passed and became law on 1 August 1834."

"After the abolition of slavery, the British found a new populace to immigrate and work the plantations: East Indians. Between 1845 and 1917 145,000 Indians went to Trinidad to work as indentured servants. The Indians were imported to Trinidad the stable and manageable labour force which, the sugar planters believed, had been lost to them since the full emancipation of the blacks." "The system was established in such a way that male Indians who had lived in Trinidad for 10 years could be granted 10 acres of Crown lands in commutation of all claims to a free return passage to India", for which many Indians opted.

"This immigration of Indians to Trinidad marked a new element to the already stratified society. Planters, officials, upper-class whites, educated coloured and black Creoles and the black working class all reacted unsympathetically to the arrival of the Indians. Interaction between the races was at a low level, and the Indians were quickly consigned to the lowest level of the socio-economic culture. This was due to many reasons, some of which were a religion differing from the norm (especially Hinduism), the lower economic status with which Indians were subjected to, and they were judged as morally unprincipled and degraded." "Indians were considered to be deceitful, prone to perjury, and abnormally fond of litigation."

"The black community was also still experiencing discrimination and had begun to form their own sub-culture apart from the dominant British and Christian ideals. The nuclear group consisted of Creole ex-slaves and their descendants. They had developed a common set of cultural characteristics, which combined to form the mainstream of the cultural pattern of Trinidad, though many Europeans still refused to accept African religious practices as genuine forms of worship and treated the devotees of African religions badly But the masses combined elements of Catholicism with non-Christian religious practices: African gods and spirits were equated with Catholic saints. The membership of these Afro-Christian sects was exclusively lower-class and black."

"Hostility and contempt were also the predominant upper and middle class attitudes towards artistic forms of African or slave derivation. African musical forms were subject to legal restrictions all through the nineteenth century. The instrument that evoked the most hostility was the 'African drum'. Drum dances like the Calenda, Belaire, and Bong, performed to the accompaniment of drums, were viewed with special horror even though the dances did not permit bodily contact between the sexes."

"In 1883 the government introduced a Music Bill which prohibited the playing of drums between the hours of 6am to 10 pm except with a police license, and after 10 pm they were absolutely prohibited. The bill was withdrawn and the Ordinance II of 1883 took its place. The Ordinance tried to put down drum dances by making every owner or occupier responsible for crowds assembling in their yards, and prohibition on the use of African drums continued. This triggered musicians to turn to tambour-bamboo bands which flourished after the early 1880s as accompaniment for calypsos and for Carnival music"; the use of the tambour-bamboo ignited the calypso music that began to dominate the music of Trinidad.

"Before emancipation, Carnival had been an elegant social affair of the upper-class Creole whites. It was introduced by the French as a series of masquerade balls (profile Trinidad), but after 1838 the ex-slaves and the lower orders generally participated. By the 1860s Carnival was taken over almost entirely by the jamets of urban slums and organized into yard bands who challenged rival bands to show off prowess in song, dance, and stick-fighting."

"Canboulay was an important feature of the jamet Carnival. This was a procession of band members, usually masked, carrying lighted torches, accompanied by drumming, singing, and shouting." What was more objectionable than band conflicts and Canboulay was the obscenity of the jamet Carnival. There were bands of prostitutes who roamed the streets, traditional masques with explicit sexual themes, and the Pissenlit (played by masked men dressed as women in long transparent nightdresses)."

"Once Canboulay was permanently abolished in 1884 and the fighting had been forcibly put down, the upper-classes began, again, to participate in Carnival, and by about 1890 businessmen were beginning to recognize the commercial benefits of Carnival. Organized calypso competitions were introduced to Port of Spain in order to improve the festival's moral tone. From 1890 onwards Carnival moved towards the place it holds today as acceptable to nearly all sectors of the population."

Trinidad and Tobago obtained self-governance in 1958 and independence from the British Empire in 1962 with the assent of the British government. Many racial and socio-economic divisions still remain.

The effects of colonial rule and slavery in the history of Trinidad and Tobago continue to affect the country in the 21st century. "Although rooted in the material history of colonialism and slavery, the dominance of this tiny (historically heterogeneous but increasingly coherent) minority of Europeans and European descendants was inseparable from beliefs about the prestige of white skin". According to scholar Neptune Harvey, during the colonial era, as in other colonized regions, "whiteness was synonymous with political, economic, and social privilege and maintaining this equivalence was an official priority and an elite preoccupation. In order to maintain this racial segregation, white men had a crucial responsibility: whenever their sexual partners were nonwhite, the exercise of discretion was paramount." Integration of blacks and whites was frowned upon, which allowed for the reinforcement of the repression of the black people and community. The effects of racism are evident throughout Lovelace's novel, namely through his portrayal of Miss Cleothilda (the "queen"). She is the only mulatto woman of the Calvary Hill, and as such, has declared herself as being above the other residents of the Hill. When she begins to date Philo, a black man, the other residents of the Hill begin to see Miss Cleothilda in a new light: as humble and as an equal to everyone else.

In 1865 the American civil engineer Walter Darwent discovered and produced oil at Aripero, Trinidad. Efforts in 1867 to begin production by the Trinidad Petroleum Company at La Brea and the Pariah Petroleum Company at Aripero were poorly financed and abandoned after Walter Darwent died of yellow fever.

In 1893 Mr. Randolph Rust, along with his neighbour, Mr. Lee Lum, drilled a successful well near Darwent's original one. By early 1907 major drilling operations began, roads were built and infrastructure built. Annual production of oil in Trinidad reached 47,000 barrels by 1910 and kept rapidly increasing year by year. The production of oil marked the beginning of the globalization and investment of capital in Trinidad, a theme that is apparent throughout The Dragon Can't Dance and is the source of much conflict of the novel.

== Plot summary ==
Prologue

The main stage for the development of the plot, Calvary Hill, is introduced through a series of descriptive elements that portray it as being something close to a slum, favela, or barrio. The mood of the hill is described through the lifestyle of Aldrick Prospect, the novel's main character: "[he] would get up at midday from sleep, yawn, stretch, then start to think of where he might get something to eat, his brain working in the same smooth unhurried nonchalance with which he moved his feet". Carnival is set as the central theme of the novel and is portrayed as the only phenomenon that is able to bring the hill to life and corrupt everyday life in Trinidad. The power and soul of Carnival, however, lies in calypso, the songs that "announce the new rhythms of the people, rhythms that climb over the red dirt and stone, break away rhythms that laugh through the bones of these enduring people".

1. Queen of the Band

The first chapter follows a conversation between Miss Olive and Miss Caroline and their criticisms of Miss Cleothlida, a proud mulatto widow who owns a parlor store but runs it as "if she were doing a favour to the Hill, rather than carrying on a business from which she intend[s] to profit" (18). Miss Cleothilda has chosen her costume for this year's Carnival and it comes as no surprise when she reveals that like every year, she will be playing Queen of the Band. Miss Cleothlida's arrogance stems from her preserved beauty and her ability to continue to attract men at her age. Philo, a calypsonian man, has been chasing after her for 17 years without success, but with continuous temptation. The neighbors note that Miss Cleothilda only treats people well during Carnival because of the natural ambiance of the Hill and so she can defend her insults throughout the year. As soon as Carnival is over, she will continue to look down upon the people who are blacker than her and the Hill will return to its slumber.

2. The Princess

At 17 years of age, Sylvia is the most desired woman on the hill. The novel moves back in time to reveal how she has constantly been a symbol of temptation and sexuality. When Miss Olive fails to come up with money to pay the rent, Sylvia is asked to go up to Mr. Guy's house and perform sexual favors. However, as hard as many men have tried, Sylvia has outsmarted all of them and has managed to retain her virginity. The men on the Hill are aware that this year Sylvia does not have a man or a costume for Carnival. Mr. Guy is quick to promise her any costume she desires in an effort to become her man, however, his attempt is interrupted by Miss Cleothilda, who is aware of the situation and purposely intrudes by offering Sylvia one of her old dresses. That night, Sylvia creeps out of her house in the middle of the night. Aldrick is able to observe her silhouette in the dark from his window, but hesitates to approach her as he believes that she is the most dangerous women on the hill because she has the ability to "capture him in passion but to enslave him in caring, to bring into his world those ideas of love and home and children that he [has] spent his whole life avoiding" (31). Nonetheless, their first verbal exchange is full of desire and temptation as she questions him about love and reveals that Mr. Guy will be the one buying her a costume that year. While the conversation drags on regarding costumes for Carnival, the real meaning and significance is of Sylvia and Aldrick revealing an attraction for one another.

3. The Dragon

Aldrick is in his small room working on his dragon costume, which he recreates every year for Carnival. While at work, thoughts of Sylvia keep coming to his head, when all of a sudden she appears at his doorstep. Her visit represents an invitation for him to take her as his woman, however, Aldrick nervously refuses to acknowledge her and instead continues working on his costume. The impasse is broken by Philo's arrival to the scene and his desire to touch Sylvia forces her to leave the scene. It is getting late and Aldrick forces Basil, a boy who always sits by him and helps him create his costume, to go home. When the boy refuses to leave, Aldrick learns that his stepfather, Fisheye, constantly abuses him at home. Aldrick's knowledge of Fisheye's violent reputation makes him hesitant to intervene, but the boy's refusal to leave forces him to walk him home and confront Fisheye.

4. The Bad John

The novel jumps back in time to reveal Fisheye's violent family history, describing them as "tall strong men who could handle their fists, and were good, each one of them, with a stick, since their father, before he became a preacher, was a champion stickfighter who had himself schooled each one of them in the art of stickfighting". Fisheye's family injected so much fear into society that no one dared to call them anything more derogatory than John. Through Fisheye's character, we see the introduction of musical bands, whose behavior emulates street gangs. Fisheye becomes the center of the Calvary Hill steelband, and as their leader, he attempts to unite several bands so that instead of fighting one another, they can unite and "fight the people who are keeping down black people...the government". While Fisheye is able to get the bands to sign peace, it never produces what he had envisioned, as this only ends the nature of violence between them without joining them in movement and opposition against the government. The spirit of peace is short-lived as Fisheye's warrior spirit emerges once the white bands come into the streets and Carnival begins to become commercialized. At the beginning, Fisheye does not mind that some of the "light-skinned" bands become sponsored, however, once the Desperadoes and Calvary Hill consider the option, he begins to fight again in an effort to drive away possible sponsors. Fisheye learns that senior members of the Calvary Hill band are considering his expulsion, and while he waits for them to approach him, the novel jumps back to the point when we see Aldrick coming to deliver Basil home. Aldrick knows that Fisheye is not in the mood for joking, but he addresses the issue with humor and avoids an altercation. On his way back home, Aldrick's mind is occupied with Silvia, when he is approached by Pariag, the Indian outcast living on the hill.

5. The Spectator

Even after two years living on the Hill, Pariag, is still seen as an outsider. Pariag migrates to the city with his wife Dolly from the New Lands in an effort to break away from the country lifestyle and become part of something bigger. The novel jumps back in time, this time to reveal the entrepreneurial spirit of the Indian outcast. Pariag's first job in the city involves buying empty bottles and re-selling them to Rum companies. Initially, he enjoys the task because he is able to talk to people and demonstrate that he is more than just a simple Indian boy. After realizing that this job brings him no meaningful social interactions, he ventures into selling roasted peanuts and boiled and fried chhena at the race track on Saturdays and at football games on Sundays. In an effort to become noticed by others on the Hill, Pariag buys a bicycle a week before Carnival, a very exciting time for people on the Hill. Pariag's new acquisition gets him the name "Crazy Indian" and makes people in the neighbourhood nervous about his ambitions and jealous of his newfound success.

6. A Call to the Dragon

The buzz of Carnival and Pariag's new acquisition have the people on the Hill gossiping. Miss Cleothilda approaches Aldrick and expresses her concerns regarding Pariag's bike, signaling that his ambitions would soon lead him into buying a parlor. Mr. Guy also approaches Aldrick with the excuse of Pariag's bike, but his real intentions are to collect the month's rent. By the time Philo approaches Aldrick, Aldrick is fed up with the gossip about the Indian and the bike, however, Philo simply invites Aldrick for a drink so that he can listen to the new calypso he will be singing that year, "The Axe Man". The following morning, hung-over from a night of drinking with Philo, Aldrick notices Pariag at his door asking him to paint a sign on a box for him: "Boya for Indian Delicacies, Barra, and Doubles!!!" Aware of the conflict that will soon arise on the Hill and wanting to remain neutral, Aldrick dismisses him with the excuse of being tired and asks him to come back later.

7. Norman "Tex" at the Carnival Fete

It is Saturday night of Carnival and the music is flowing in the air. Norman "Tex" has been playing the saxophone all night with great intensity, and Philo is enjoying a night of popularity thanks to "The Axe Man". Aldrick manages to temporarily forget about Sylvia amidst the smoke, rum, and ambience of the night. However, when morning hits and he finds himself out in the Yard with a girl named Inez, the thought of Sylvia's costume returns to haunt him. Nonetheless, he chooses to bring Inez home and make love to her until morning.

8. To Be Dragon and Man

It is Carnival on Monday morning and the Hill begins to ready itself for a big day. Aldrick follows a yearly ritual of putting on his costume and entering a new mental state with a dragon mask that gives him a mission of upholding an unending rebellion. However, this year he feels as if he is the last symbol of rebellion and threat in Port-of-Spain. Fisheye is under orders to not misbehave and Philo has stopped singing calypsos of rebellion, which forces Aldrick to question if he still believes in the dragon anymore. Yet, as soon as he steps outside, Carnival hits him and he suddenly feels tall and proud: "No, this ain't no joke. This is warriors going to battle. This is the guts of the people, their blood" (123). Aldrick becomes the dragon of Port of Spain for two full days. He feels joy when he sees terror in people's faces after gazing at him: "he liked it when they saw him coming and gathering up their children and ran". On his way home, Aldrick stumbles upon the Calvary Hill band that refuses to end Carnival and wants to continue dancing. Aldrick slowly works his way to the front of the band towards Sylvia, who has been dancing wildly to the rhythm of the steelband. After observing her for a while, he reaches out to touch her but she spins out reach and, facing him, delivers a vocal blow: "No mister! I have my man!" (128) Suddenly, Guy appears behind her and caresses her towards him, leaving Aldrick frozen in the moment, dwelling in pain as Sylvia dances away with another man.

9. Ash Wednesday

Aldrick awakes on Ash Wednesday and emerges from his room to look out at the yard with Carnival still swimming in his mind. He inhales deeply and the stench of poverty hits his nostrils for the first time in his life. He looks over all of the "pathetic and ridiculous looking shacks planted in this brown dirt and stone, this was his home". With Sylvia's rejection still fresh in his mind, he says, "I have to learn to feel." This marks his acceptance of Calvary Hill as his home, and his life. Meanwhile, Miss Cleothilda recognized, for the first time, a change in the yard that threatens her position of queen: a combination of Philo's newfound success, her inability to convince Aldrick to do something about Pariag's continued presence, and most of all, Sylvia's new man, Guy. Guy could "keep her in style",(135) and if she became ambitious, could become the new "queen". As a result of all this, Miss Cleothilda begins to use Miss Olive as a way to create a friendship with Sylvia so that she could mold her as she saw fit into the new "queen" of the yard. Her relationship with Philo causes a stir in the yard and people begin to question whether or not it is intimate. If so, it brings a more human side, a weakness, in Miss Cleothilda. A shyness comes over Aldrick and he begins to feel he is not the dragon he once was, and pines for Sylvia. One morning, the yard wakes to Pariag screaming over his mutilated bicycle.

10. Friends and Family

Pariag marches his bicycle down Alice street in a funeral procession-like manner, while Fisheye, Aldrick and some other youth from around Calvary Hill watch closely from the corner. The close attention he receives marks one of the first instances where he appears "alive" to others, connecting with them in a humane way. In the days after the bicycle accident, Pariag thinks deeply of his existence and purpose in his life, and because he steps back to view himself, it brings him closer to his wife, Dolly. They decide one night after seeing an Indian film in San Juan to visit their family up in the country on their day off. While there, the family's hospitality mimicked that of a host treating a guest, and they felt instantly like outsiders on the farm. But to his nieces and nephew's he represented a wider world, of something more than their village existence. His wealthy uncle calls for him and criticizes his decision to move to Port of Spain: "Is so you want to live, among Creole people, like cat and dog, and forget your family. You have family boy. Next thing you know, you leave your wife – who you didn't bring to see me." Pariag returns home that night to Calvary Hill feeling that his mind is made up on where he was going to be in life, and his finality makes him feel at peace.

11. The New Yard

By August, many things, such as relationships, have changed around the yard. Miss Cleothilda has decided she is to be "queen" once more, but with a more gentile superiority complex. Philo had made it inside her home weeks earlier and is now her man. Sylvia is her protégée. Miss Cleothilda becomes giving and inquisitive around the yard and shows off the belief that "all o' we is one" when Dolly becomes pregnant and she leads her baby shower. Miss Olive and Miss Caroline also accept her on a more human level because she is with a lower caste black man despite her mulattoness. For them, the relationship unites her more closely with the people of Calvary Hill. Meanwhile, Aldrick sits in his doorway, thoughtful. He has become a quiet man and has little interest in, yet again, being the dragon of carnival. He feels like he has outgrown this costume and role.

12. Outcasts

Aldrick, Fisheye and a few other young men have begun assembling at the corner more and more, not in the same company, but occupying the same space. They are men who no longer partake in carnival, especially since Johnson and Fullers began sponsoring their steelband. For them, the true renegade spirit of masking as timeless warriors of generations past has been overrun by modern forces such as business and tourism. One day, Aldrick calls out to a passing Sylvia telling her that it's her life and she does not have to spite him. He warns her of her choices early on and how they carry residual consequences for the outcome of her life. Of course, he is referencing her relationships with Miss Cleothilda and Guy. Philo comes by later and takes Aldrick out for a drink. Philo is hell-bent on proving that his recent success in calypso music has not changed him, that he is still an integral part of the hill. Fisheye does not like Philo hanging around and confronts Aldrick about their friendship. One day at the corner, Philo drops by with a bottle and two girls to say hello and have a couple drinks. Fisheye says to Philo: "Philo, you ain't have no friend here. You is a big shot." Philo looks at Aldrick, who tells him to go. When Philo offers the bottle, Fisheye throws it to the ground and hits one of his girls. "Is war, Philo." Philo, in retaliation, makes a hit calypso that is played all over the island about the hooligans in Port of Spain. Meanwhile, everyone is gearing up for carnival and Aldrick just looks on from his spot at the corner, feeling odd. He dreams of dragons every night but never starts working on his costume. While police begin to crack down on public loitering, Fisheye plots an attack against the police.

13. The Dragon Dance

Fisheye comes to the corner one day with a pistol and tells the eight of them there that they are not to part when the police come around to kick loiterers off the street. His plan is that two of them will begin fighting when the police come, and when they get out to break it up, "they will see". When the police come by and break up Crowley and Synco's brawl, they cuff the police at gun-point, put them in the back and speed off in the squad car. They go to Woodford Square, the political centre of Port of Spain, where speeches and rallies are always held. Over the megaphone they proclaim: "This is the People's Liberation Army." At one point Aldrick takes the microphone and says: "make no peace with slavery...make no peace with shanty towns, dog shit, piss. We have to rise up as people. People". Before this point, it had not been fully understood that Aldrick or any of these men, except for maybe Liberty Varlance, had any political motives behind their rebellious lifestyles. Crowds assemble to watch the chase, and it ensues for a couple of days, as the police figured they were not a threat to anyone's safety and they would eventually tire themselves out or run out of gas.

14. Prison Dance

Their defence attorney in court is a young man with passionate radical views and is very eloquent in his defence of the Calvary Hill nine (as papers had dubbed them). But in the end, it is not enough and they are all to serve sentences of a few years. Aldrick serves six years. While in prison they spend much of their time at the beginning sitting and discussing what they really expected from their stint in the police car, and in the end it seems it was all for show, a bluff, a dragon dance. After a while, during their prison sentence, they all drift apart and have no intention of continuing from where they left off once they get out of jail.

15. The Dragon Can't Dance

Aldrick returns to Calvary Hill after six years in prison and is greeted like a hero, yet he feels more like he is being received by a band of deserters that have long made peace with the enemy. He meets a new girl in a bar, named Molly, and she tells him of the two thousand people playing devil in the upcoming carnival. Aldrick gets temporarily excited that perhaps times have not changed, until she says they are "Fancy devil, with silk and satin. Pretty Devil". He tells her of his time as dragon, a real dragon breathing fire and wearing long claws. The next day, he visits Sylvia for the first time in over six years and finds that she has matured. Sylvia recounts her confusion during the days he was in the police car, while Aldrick looks around her house and sees that Guy has provided her with many luxuries: a television, stereo, refrigerator, etc. Miss Cleothilda comes in and shakes his hand, she has aged considerably. She tells Aldrick about the degradation of the neighbourhood, namely crime by young men whom she thinks were inspired by Fisheye's police jeep hijacking. Guy has become a city councilor and because of this news, Miss Cleothilda challenges Aldrick: "What you could give her?" Shortly after, he realizes that Sylvia will soon be getting married. When Aldrick leaves her home, he realizes that maybe Sylvia had her life in control from the beginning, and that it is not so much that she chose Guy as she resisted the impotence of dragons. And with this, Aldrick feels at peace with the chapter of his life where Sylvia might have become a part. He walks by Pariag's new store and is tempted to go in a talk to Pariag, but instead he walks on, disillusioned by his past and what the future holds.

16. The Shopkeeper

Pariag had seen Aldrick stop outside of his shop, and it troubles him greatly that he (Aldrick) did not come in to speak with him. After all these years, Pariag still has not established any sense of belonging in Calvary Hill, and as a result of his ongoing isolation has more or less concluded that he is done with Creole people. Even with a shop, Pariag still did not acquire any degree of superiority in relation to others around the neighbourhood, saying "shop don't make a man". He wishes, for the sake of the hill, that life was better for everybody, and that there was more unity between peoples. He lies with Dolly and they discuss their life together, remembering their life back in the country and his first meeting with her when he said that she would have to accept living in Port of Spain.

17. The Calypsonian

Philo stands out on his veranda in Diego Martin, an affluent neighbourhood of Trinidad, and looks out at the homes of people he thinks he has just figured out as being uniformly successful but also unfulfilled as human beings. From this revelation comes a new tune and he goes in to write it down, and there on his desk he finds the wedding invitation for Sylvia and Guy. As he thinks about Sylvia's position in the yard as the symbol of youth and hope, he remembers Aldrick's love for her, but also Guy's taste for young women and his ability to get what he wanted. Philo thinks to himself: "Marriage to Guy was a horse of different colors." He remembers a discussion about Sylvia and Guy that he had some time ago with Miss Cleothilda, and her undying faith in their life together. Cleothilda explains some of Sylvia's side love interests, one man whom identified strongly with Africa, another that spoke passionately about Cuba, Vietnam, China and Trinidad's potential for revolution. The youthful exuberance of these boys always enticed Sylvia greatly. Remembering the yard troubles Philo while he waits for one of his young girls to come by. He looks back on his youth, his family. She arrives and Philo decides to be forward with her and asks to have sex. Afterwards, he feels guilty for being so straight with her. Later that night, he decides to drive to Calvary Hill to see everybody. He is greeted warmly at a bar near the yard, and later decides to go and see Miss Cleothilda. She meets him at the door and tells him to come inside, that he knows where the bedroom is, but, even him forgetting that would not surprise her very much "with the way the world is going".

== Themes ==
In the novel The Dragon Can't Dance, author Earl Lovelace expresses several reoccurring themes that illustrate fundamental psychological losses, which the characters are trying to rediscover and re-establish on a personal, and community level. Aldrick and his compadres are striving to find meaning and locate connectedness in something other than their involvement in the Carnival experience that occurs annually in their city of Port of Spain. In spite of their efforts, their multi-generational lack of roots and culture prevent them from developing productive attachments. This undermines their sense of identity on a personal and societal level.

The first theme that emerges is characters longing for acceptance. Pariag [the Indian] feels this way about moving to a new location to be part of a bigger group and community. This in turn makes him feel more worthwhile. Pariag says, "The main reason he [Pariag] had come to the city to live was so that he could join up with people, be part of something bigger..." Pariag wanted to experience a sense of belonging. He correctly understood that only through new relationships could his life feel more meaningful.

The second theme is the call for unity and power to the people. In a desperate attempt to ignite a sense of raison d'être within the people of his community, Aldrick, Fisheye and the other men highjack the police van and drive crazily though the town center and shout: "We are the People's Liberation Army. Today we are calling our people to come out, to rise up and take power! Rise and reclaim you manhood, people! Rise up!" These young men are trying to inspire unity and meaning within a community that had been disconnected from its cultural roots for hundreds of years.

Another theme is the search for self-identity. Near the end of the book, Aldrick questions his identity. He thinks to himself, "What was he [Aldrick] without the dragon? Who was he? What was there to define himself? What would he be able to point to and say: This is Aldrick?" Without a history or culture to relate to, Aldrick represents a vast number of people of Trinidad who are at a loss in terms of their identities. He is searching for his roots or some clue that will direct him homeward.

Lastly, the theme of power struggles for recognition plays a large part of this novel. For example, Miss Cleothilda feels threatened by the prospect that Sylvia might be taking over the "queen" or head woman position on the Hill. "It didn't take Miss Cleothilda long to discover that a new situation had begun to exist in the Yard, a situation that she felt threatened her position as 'queen'... it was Sylvia... if she [Sylvia] became ambitious, the Yard could have a new 'queen'. Miss Cleothilda began making readjustments." When Miss Cleothilda's core identity of what makes her human or the 'queen' is at risk, a struggle to survive sets in. Recognition is paramount. Since the opportunities for expressing self-worth and intrinsic value are so limited on Calvary Hill (and Trinidad overall), even minor roles within the community become critical to people, especially if they have been alienated and marginalized.

All of these themes are interwoven and indicative of a primary absence of fulfilling attachment, which serves as the lynchpin to identity. Attachment is developed through fertile relationships that act as conveyances of our history and culture. With the systematic, long-term destruction of the memory of Trinidad's past, the identity and self-worth of its people are set adrift.

== Other interpretations of the deeper meanings ==
In The Dragon Can't Dance, the hope for personal and community transformation is at the heart of the novel. After researching numerous analyses of the novel, several significant and more profound meanings appear to rise to the surface. These deeper meanings consist of the importance of "performativity" as it relates to cultural resistance, the strategy of the performer (or the lack thereof), and the viability of transformation available to individual or group identities when no adjustment is made to fit in with current day norms or standards.

As with other post-colonial populations, Trinidad's society represents a culture of resistance in response to the tyranny of slavery and colonialism in general. Although this expression of resistance is prevalent and observable in daily life, it is especially evident during Carnival and its performances where large audiences are in attendance. According to Nadia Johnson, "the performativity of Trinidad's carnival becomes an outward expression of Calvary Hill's need to transform their social conditions. The characters respond to and resist their social conditions through their individual performances during the carnival season: Fisheye's steel band performance, Aldrick's dragon dance, and Philo's calypsos". If transformation of identity is the goal, then it is critical to assess which performances are effective in contributing to the transformation.

Mawuena Logan, in her article "Postcoloniality and Resistance in Earl Lovelace's The Wine of Astonishment and The Dragon Can't Dance" refers to Frantz Fanon, who describes "the postcolonial subject" as being in a "zone of nonbeing, an extraordinarily sterile and arid region, an utterly naked declivity, but – where an authentic upheaval can be born - a liminal space". Performing one's way out of this liminal space and transforming identity into an "aggregated or consummated" form is a complex process that requires time, but the reward is true freedom.

Our first performer, Fisheye, chooses to use his steelband music as his "agent of cultural resistance in Carnival". He regards this music and anyone involved with it as "sacred" and has no patience for those who he believes try to commercialize it. In fact, he withdraws from the steelband group in protest. This action causes him to deprive himself from future opportunities to perform his way toward a more transformed identity. Ultimately, he decides to go in a more violent direction with the Calvary Nine and ends up in jail.

Aldrick considers his dragon costume and his two-day performance in Carnival to be his magical route to helping himself and "the little fellars in the Yard". At first he believes whole-heartedly that his performance is capable of bringing about transformation, but gradually he becomes disenchanted and chooses to follow the Calvary Nine route to nowhere. Logan posits that Aldrick's "annual donning of the dragon costume in remembrance of the ancestors" and his next move of joining the Calvary Nine "which parallels the ritual of his dragon costume, is equally futile". Aldrick had no real strategy or plan to support his wish for transformation. "Both the ritual dragon dance/costume and the open rebellion without a plan or definite goal constitute that postcolonial moment that is devoid of any tangible and positive results because it is lacking in thoughtful action: the ritual subject is stuck between two realities, betwixt and between the past and the future."

Nadia Johnson on the other hand believed that Philo had developed a strategy vis-à-vis his calypso performances that yielded immense progress in terms of his personal transformation of identity and indirectly produced similar benefits to his community on Calvary Hill. Although previously described as a "Judas" because of his "betrayal" of the non-possession ideology of the hill, by the end of the novel, it is Philo who returns to his origins hoping to continue his life.

If the performer is effective, what is his strategy or "thoughtful action". What is highly significant in this process is which of these performances is effective and what makes certain performances more effective than others. colonialism and poverty are other themes highlighted in a large proportion in the novel

== Reviews ==
Describing the novel as "a landmark, not in the West Indian, but in the contemporary novel", C. L. R. James also said: "The Dragon Can't Dance is a remarkable canvas of shanty-town life in which Lovelace's intimate knowledge of rural Trinidad and the Carnival as a sustaining cultural tradition are brilliantly brought to life."

Most critiques and reviews of The Dragon Can't Dance have proven to be positive. "Aside from a few review notices of his first two novels, Earl Lovelace had received little critical treatment until the publication of The Dragon Can't Dance. Since the appearance of that work, it has become one of the most highly acclaimed contemporary Caribbean novels". Many critics comment on Lovelace's use of unconventional local Trinidadian style and dialogue, describing it as difficult at times to follow, but generally his style is said to be poetic, all-consuming, and informative.

One blogger, Hazel, who has a substantial following of her review blog, gave The Dragon Can't Dance a five-(out-of-five) star review and had to say about the book: "I had forgotten how stunning this book is. On this rereading, I found the prologue, on poverty and futility, so poignant and painful that I was minded to desist, and pick up something light and insubstantial instead. I persisted and am rewarded with an engaging narrative of the stories of individuals; the ripening girl destined for whoredom; the vigorous young man seeking to release his energy in warfare; the frustrated artist, with a single annual outlet for his creativity; the outsider, seeking to be seen, to be recognized."

"I am not doing Lovelace and his novel justice. But I recommend it highly, to mature readers who appreciate lyrical writing, and do not require a happy ending. It may take some time, as well to adjust to the dialogue which is in Trinidadian dialect."

Other reviews by various sources that support Hazel's review include:

- "Essential reading, and deserving of warm welcome after such long delay" – Michael Upchurch
- "A wonderful work, filled with insight, depth, and truth."
- "Caribbean writer Lovelace, whose Salt won the 1997 Commonwealth Writers' Prize, returns with a story (first published in England in 1979) that offers a defining and luminously sensitive portrait of postcolonial island life."
- "Kaleidoscopically colorful characters and a faithful ear help make this quest for personhood one of Lovelace's best works."

== Life experiences reflected in literature ==
Lovelace's literary work emerges from his personal life experiences with diverse social groups in different areas of Trinidad and Tobago and reflects the difficulties of having to negotiate an independent present with a colonial past. While the author currently dedicates much of his time to advocating for reparations to be made to descendant slaves, the legacy of his writing continues to resonate within Trinidadian society in the efforts to rebuild a positive sense of identity in the Caribbean. Lovelace acknowledges this notion as a sense of "personhood", through which each individual whatever their social, cultural, or racial status can be an active participant in the creation of identities.

While most of the plot in The Dragon Can't Dance takes place in Port of Spain, many of its characters are migrants from rural areas that attempt to create individual lifestyles in the unsettling and dislocated slums of Calvary Hill. The migrant nature of these characters is a clear reflection of Lovelace's diverse experiences throughout his native country. After being fired from a job at the Guardian, one of Trinidad's local newspapers, Lovelace took a job as a forest ranger in Valencia. Here, he would accompany and supervise laborers who ventured into the forest, which helped him develop an appreciation for the locals: "the real advantage to staying was getting to know the place and the people intimately. And this helped me to develop a love and respect for ordinary people and to want, although I did not necessarily think so, to tell their stories, to establish their validity and their values". After Valencia, he accepted a post as an agricultural officer in the remote village of Rio Claro, where he noted that "the whole culture of Trinidad unfolded". Lovelace felt as if he was able to become deeply immersed in a culture where he would "see stick fighting and... go and sing with the drummers for the stick fights".

Out of these experiences, Lovelace adopted a view that there were two basic spaces in which people entered when they arrived in Trinidad and Tobago: the ethnic space, in which members of a group carried on the religion] and cultural practices they brought with them, and the creole space, encompassing the general meeting place of cultures. Lovelace notes that within the groups that came to occupy these spaces, Africans were the only ones not allowed an ethnic space in which they could maintain the religion and culture they had come with, since cultural and religious forms that were considered to be African, were banned at one point or another. Therefore, Africans had to find ways of bringing religion and culture into ways that were legitimate. Carnival would become one such space because it was a legal and legitimate festival and what now seem to be independent activities like calypso, stickfighting, or carnival characters, were actually linked to a deeper cultural and religious sentiment.

Lovelace also highlights the importance of calypso in his novel. He notes that even though calypso and drumming were previously banned, they were both powerful forces within society as they were linked to Carnival, which was also seen at the time as "a relic of barbarism and the annual abomination and so on". Having calypso identified with bacchanal meant that calypso was linked and limited to the bacchanal season of Carnival: "Once upon a time the entire Carnival was an expression of rebellion. Once there were stickfighters who assembled each year to keep alive in battles between themselves the practice of warriorhood born in them; and there were devils, black men who blackened themselves further with black grease to make of their very blackness a menace, a threat."

Lovelace hopes that his work will help create an environment that will break the residual impasse of the colonial hangover. Drawing back from his idea of "two spaces", the ethnic space and the creole space, he argues that Africans have poured a lot of themselves into that creole space because they were denied a legitimate ethnic space, which thus provides them with the opportunity and responsibility of seeing that this space is made into a real meeting place for all.
