= Fort San Andres =

Coordinates: 10.6478°N 61.5106°W

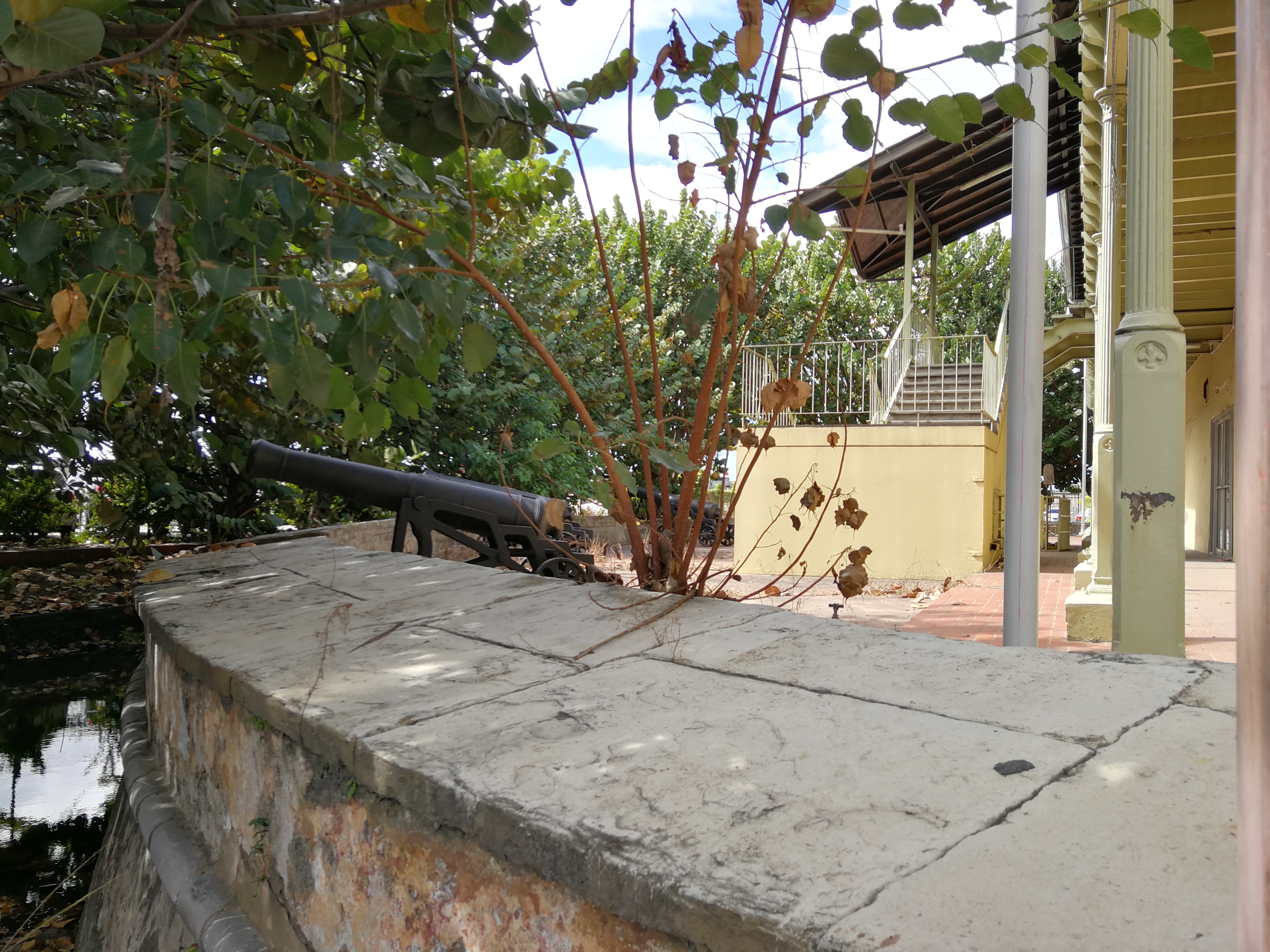
Fort San Andres today

Fort San Andres is the last surviving fortification from the period of the Spanish Occupation of Trinidad, which came to an end in 1797 with the capture of the island by the British.

As early as 1733, a fortification called Fort San Andres was planned to replace a redoubt of fascines and earth, which was the only defense to Port of Spain. This however was not completed until 1787.

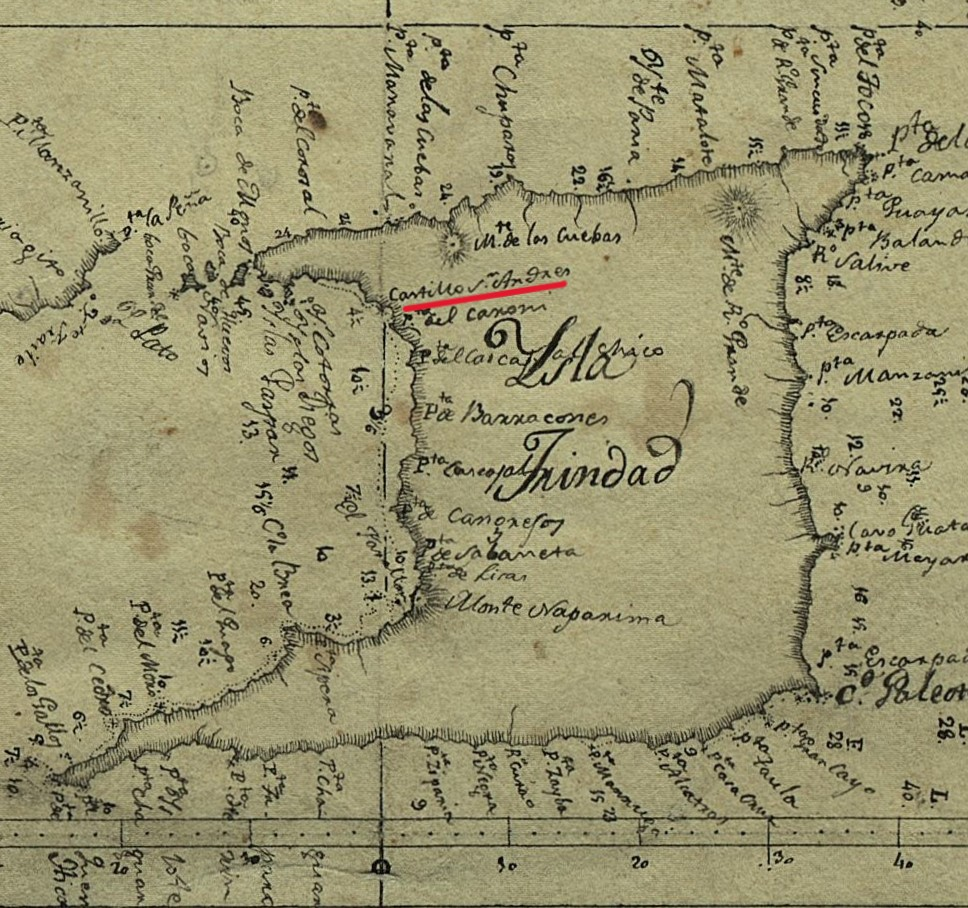
Detail Isla Trinidad de Barlovento 1794

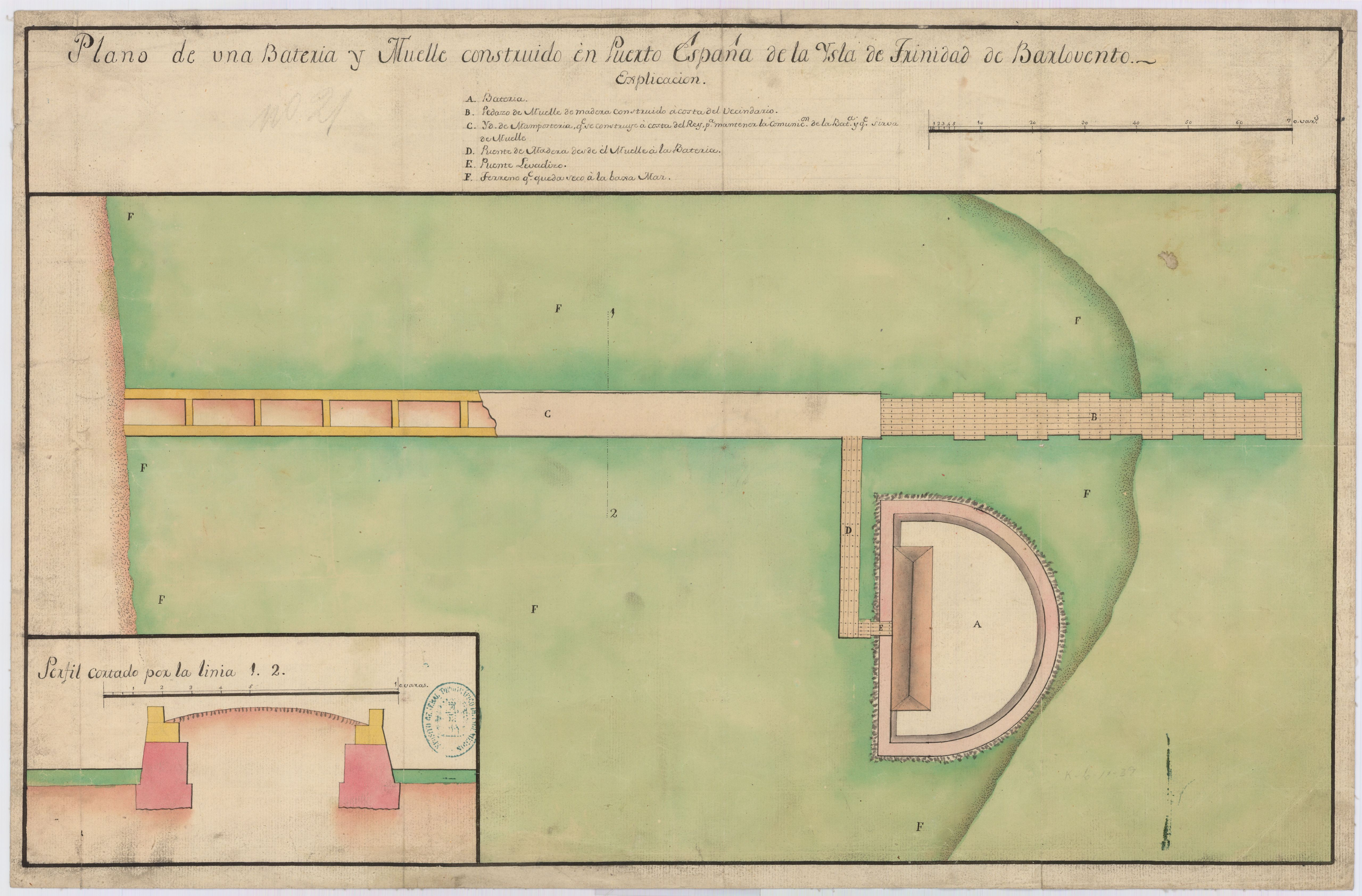
"Plano de una Batería y muelle construido en Puerto España de la Ysla de Trinidad de Barlovento"

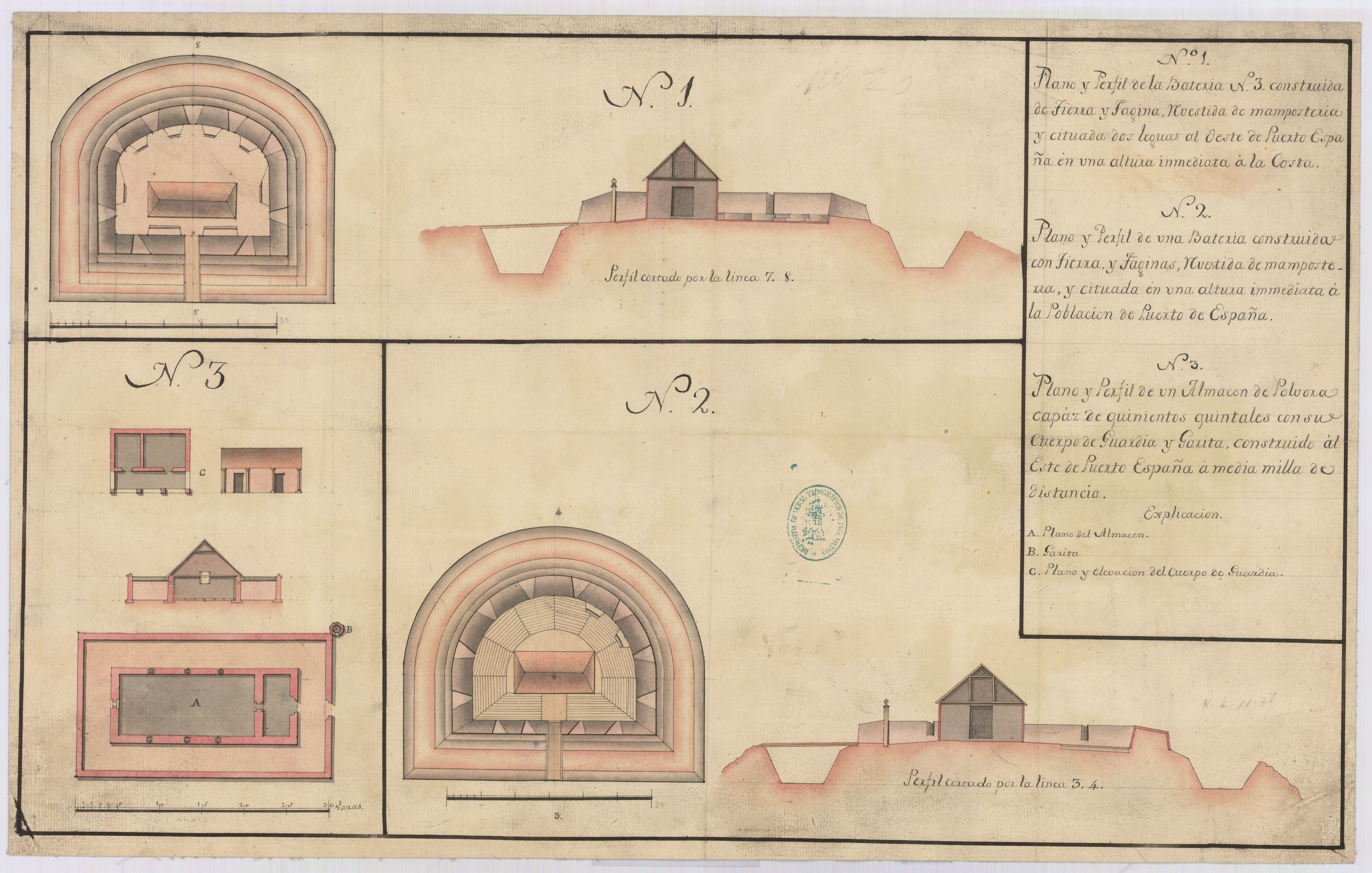
"Nº 2 Plano y perfil de una Batería construida con tierra y fajinas, revestida de mampostería y situada en una altura inmediata la población de Puerto de España"

The redoubt was located more or less where Royal Bank now stands. Port of Spain or as it was known to the Spanish, Puerto de los Hispanioles, initially was restricted to a few streets east of the St. Ann's or Tragarete River which at that time ran west along what is now Park Street and south to the foreshore through what is now Woodford Square and Chacon Street.

St. Ann's River, now better known as the Dry River, was diverted to its present course by the Spanish Governor Chacón and completed in 1787. The new fort was constructed as a mole linked to the mainland by a wooden bridge. The fort mounted five cannon and was "useful in maintaining good order among shipping anchored off-shore".

In 1845, the Port of Spain Town council approved the filling of the Port of Spain waterfront to the northern side of Fort San Andres. Late in the nineteenth century the shoreline was again filled to its present line, completely land-locking the Fort.

The Fort fell into disuse and later a structure was built on the old fort to house the Harbour Master and various other government offices, including the Police Service Traffic Branch. In 1995 the building was restored and converted to a museum of the City of Port of Spain. Several of the original cannons survive and the foundations bear the date 1785.
