= Michel-Jean Cazabon =

Trinidad and Tobago painter (1813–1888)

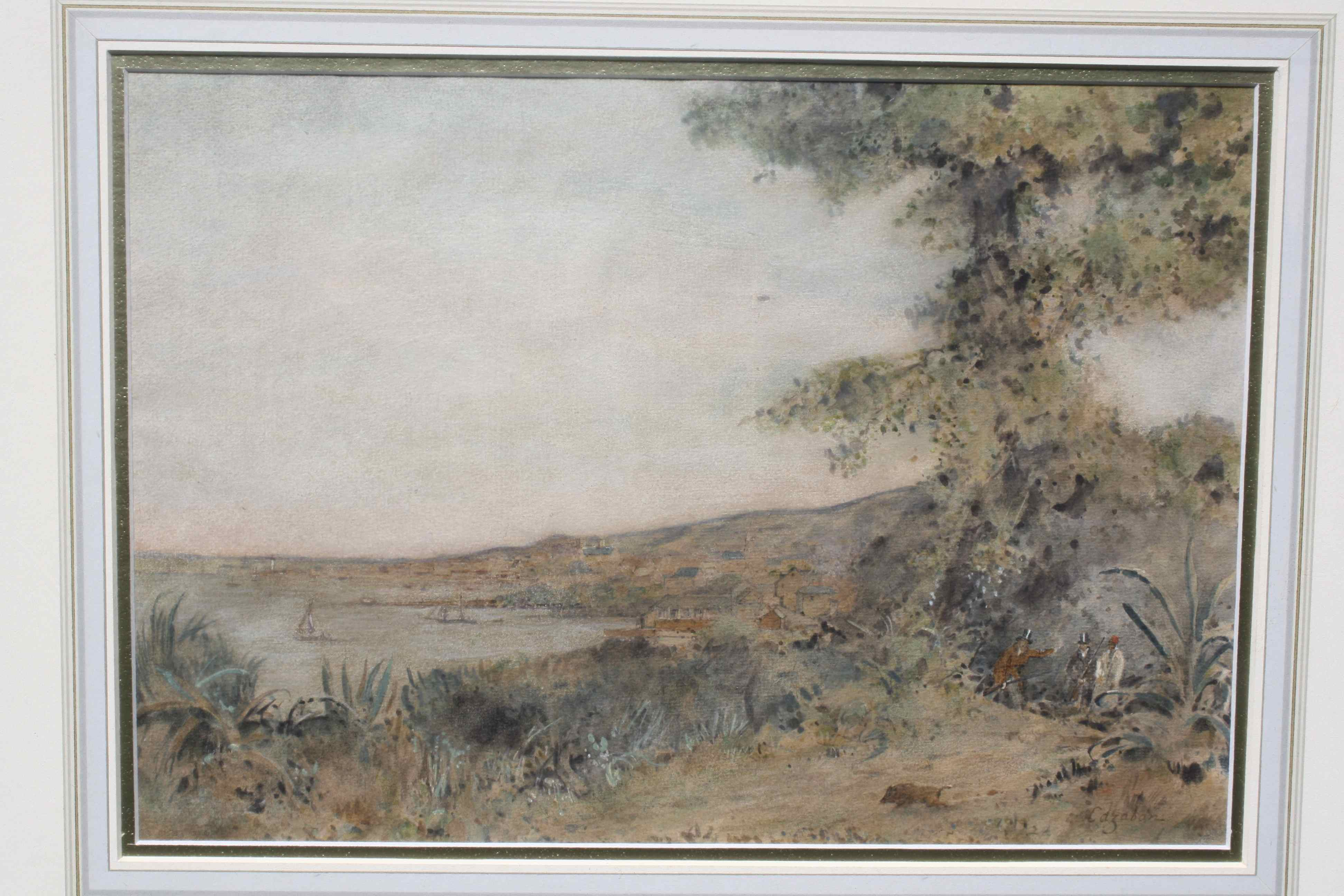
View of Port of Spain – painting by Cazabon

Michel-Jean Cazabon (September 20, 1813 – November 20, 1888) is regarded as the first great Trinidadian painter and is Trinidad's first internationally known artist. He is also known as the layman painter. He is renowned for his paintings of Trinidad scenery and for his portraits of planters, merchants and their families in the 19th century. Cazabon's paintings are to be cherished not only for their beauty but also their historical importance: his painting has left us with a clear picture of the many aspects of life in Trinidad through much of the 19th century.

Cazabon relied on nature to expose the vistas which the plains of the Caroni and the tropical forests at Chaguaramas are idyllic in splendor. His portraits of the mulattoes, indentured Indians and Negroes were the bases of debate, about whether the painter immortalized these people because he felt a personal bond with them rather less than the European Creoles of which no stately portraits were ever recorded.

Cazabon preferred to describe himself as a "landscape painter", but in Trinidad, away from the metropolitan influences and stimuli, he embraced the everyday, often mundane, forms of artistic expression – teacher, illustrator, portrait painter.

In England and France, his work was much admired and he won awards and medals at exhibitions. In 1851 and 1857, two books of his engravings of Trinidad landscapes were produced in Paris, France. He was the first Trinidad artist whose style influenced artists for many score years after his death. He was an assiduous worker. A few of his paintings and prints are to be found in the National Museum and Art Gallery and in private collections in Trinidad and abroad.

== Biography ==
Michel-Jean Cazabon was born of French-Martinique parentage in Trinidad on September 20, 1813 on Corinth Estate, Northern Naparima, on the outskirts of San Fernando. He was the youngest of four children. His parents, owners of a sugar plantation, were "free colored" immigrants from Martinique, who had come to Trinidad following the Cedula of Population of 1783.

In 1826, at the age of 13, Cazabon went to school at St. Edmund's College, Ware, England, returning to Trinidad in 1830. In about 1837, he sailed for Paris to study medicine. He gave up these studies and started off as an art student under Paul Delaroche a leading painter in Paris. His parents' wealth supported his pursuits and those of his family for many years in an enviable life-style and only later in life did he find it necessary to earn a living from his paintings.

He followed the familiar pattern for students at that time, travelling extensively in France and Italy painting the landscape. His work was shown at the Salon du Louvre in 1839 and every year from 1843 to 1847. His philosophy and style follow closely that of the contemporary French landscape artists. In 1843 he married a French woman, Rosalie Trolard. His first daughter was born in Paris in 1844, followed by the birth of his only son. In 1845 he visited Trinidad, returning to Paris in 1851 to publish a series of 18 lithographs, "Views of Trinidad, 1851". After the birth of his second daughter in Paris in 1852, he returned with his family to Trinidad.

Cazabon soon became popular as a society painter, not only with his paintings of Trinidad scenery, but also with his portraits of the planters and merchants of Port of Spain and their families. He taught art, and provided illustrations of local events for English newspapers. In Trinidad, Cazabon's most important patron was Lord Harris, the English Governor from 1848 to 1854, recording many of his social functions and excursions. The Harris Collection of 44 paintings, now displayed at the family home at Belmont in Kent, England, is perhaps the most important collection of 19th-century visual references of Trinidad. Several other less extensive, but important collections were commissioned by William Burnley, the Scottish-American planter, John Lamont and the Earl of Dundonald. In 1857, Cazabon published a second series of 18 lithographs of local scenes, Album of Trinidad. In 1860, he published, with the photographer Hartmann, a series of 16 lithographs entitled Album of Demerara, and in that same year contributed one of the scenes in Album Martiniquais, published by Hartmann and the lithographer Eugène Cicéri.

In 1862, Cazabon moved with his family to Saint Pierre in Martinique. He hoped that Saint Pierre, described then as the Paris of the New World, would offer a metropolitan spirit that Trinidad lacked, and provide a greater appreciation for his art. Finding much the same attitudes prevailing, he returned to Trinidad about 1870 and attempted to pick up the threads of his former life. Never to regain his social standing, he began to drink to dull his disillusionment. Hawking his paintings around Port of Spain, he became known only as a drunken, though gentle, old eccentric. In 1888, while working at his easel, he died of a heart attack, and the following day was unceremoniously buried in Lapeyrouse Cemetery.

Lawrence Scott's novel Light Falling on Bamboo (Tindal Street Press, 2012) is a re-imagining of Cazabon's life.
