= The House of Hunger =

1978 book by Dambudzo Marechera

- First edition (UK)
- Author: Dambudzo Marechera
- Genre: Short story
- Publisher: Heinemann (UK); Pantheon Books (US)
- Publication date: 1978
- Publication place: Zimbabwe (then Rhodesia)
- ISBN: 0-435-90986-X
- OCLC: 30208116
- Followed by: Black Sunlight

The House of Hunger (1978) is a novella/short story collection by Zimbabwean writer Dambudzo Marechera (1952–1987), his first published book, and was published three years after he left university and ten years before his death.

Sometimes subtitled Short Stories, this work is actually a collection of one novella of 80-odd pages ("House of Hunger") and nine satellite short stories. The small group of texts in its entirety reflects the author's vision of (mainly township) life in Rhodesia (specifically, the period of Ian Smith's rule of the country that at independence became Zimbabwe) — with a minority of the shorter pieces in the book depicting an African exile's experience of life in Britain (mainly at Oxford University, where Marechera had studied).

== Content and reception ==
The book is typically described as "vulgar", "obscene", "lewd", "morally objectionable", "irreverent", "notorious", "brutal," and "violent", but also as "honest" and "beautiful". Marechera's distinctive collage prose is discussed and utilized frequently.

Commenting on the semi-autobiographical nature of the book, April McCallum has said: "Marechera's debut The House of Hunger is as much a product of being down and out in Oxford, sleeping rough, being beaten up by thugs and policeman alike and struggling with alcoholism, as it is of the Rhodesia it describes.... The 'hunger' of the book's title does not refer only to the literal starvation which was ravaging post-independent Zimbabwe at the time. Rather it implies a more far reaching and metaphorical hunger of the soul – the vacuous yearning and emptiness within the national consciousness, aspiring for more but held back by poverty and corruption."

First published to critical acclaim in 1978 (Heinemann African Writers Series, no. 207), The House of Hunger the following year was joint winner — alongside Neil Jordan's Night In Tunisia — of the Guardian Fiction Prize. At the award ceremony, with typically unconventional and disruptive behaviour, Marechera threw plates at his fellow guests. Doris Lessing wrote that reading Marechera's work was "like overhearing a scream". Because it was so vivid about the experience of growing up in slum conditions in Harare, James Currey (his former publisher as editorial director of Heinemann Educational Books) has described it as "a shocking book".

Helon Habila has called the book's opening line ("I got my things and left") "the coolest opening line in African fiction", as well as being "a fair summary of the writer's life."

Novelist Drew Johnson said in 2009: "Marechera's knack for surprise and ambush would be the envy of any airport thriller writer, yet here it's entirely divorced from plot. Surprise is managed in a way that I don't know how to explain or what exactly to compare it to—it's just genuinely unexpected. The House of Hunger shocked me, not because it brought me the news about some bit of brutality or another—literature from every continent and era has made that more or less routine—but because I was shocked by the words on the page, the book in my hands. Marechera seemed to be coming at me with everything, yet with an enormous artistry. His life seemed to be at stake in his words and, while I was reading, so did mine."

Michelle Decker has written, "Marechera's satire [in The House of Hunger] relies on a formal and stylistic mode heavily imbued with the very chaos and grotesquery that his texts criticize, ... deliberately alienating the reader at every level of content and form. Content: sordid representations of sexuality, domestic abuse, drunkenness, and profanity; form: a disjointed, chaotic narrative from the perspective of mostly unlikeable characters. Marechera's writing feels less like satire than the experience of being forced to relive someone else's nightmare—the characters' demons have somehow become yours, but you may never be able to decipher why you (or they) are being so tormented. Whether this aesthetic was a self-indulgent, European import or a revolutionary, antinationalist African innovation depended on whom you asked."

== Film ==
A Channel Four film adaptation of the book as a drama-documentary, with which Marechera was initially involved, and for which he returned to Zimbabwe in 1982 ostensibly for five weeks, soon ran into trouble when the author fell out with the producer. Marechera withdrew from the film, and he never again left the country, dying there five years later.

== Selected editions ==
- 1978: Heinemann African Writers Series (No. 207), 1st edition;
  - 2009: Heinemann, 2nd edition, ISBN 978-0435895983.
- 1978: Pantheon, US hardback edition, ISBN 978-0394508320.
