= List of prisoner-of-war escapes =

This list of prisoner-of-war escapes includes successful and unsuccessful attempts in chronological order, where possible.

== Thirty Years' War ==
- In the beginning of the war Hans Ulrich von Schaffgotsch's detachment of 8,000 imperial cavalrymen surprised Jindřich Matyáš Thurn's force in the outskirts of Steinau, taking Thurn and general Jacob Duwall prisoners. Duwall quickly escaped captivity, organizing the defence of Breslau, where he died from liver failure in April 1634.
- Former Imperial general Johann Philipp Kratz von Scharffenstein was captured at the Battle of Nördlingen and taken to Vienna, where he managed to escape and fled to Silesia. He was seized again and brought back to Vienna where he was convicted of treason and executed on 26 July 1635.
- Holy Roman general Federico Savelli was captured by Bernard of Saxe-Weimar in the aftermath of the Second Battle of Rheinfelden (3 March 1638). He managed to escape from his cell after the woman tasked with bringing him food, freed him instead. She was later executed along with seven alleged accomplices.

== American Revolutionary War ==
- 1781 – Continental Navy officer Joshua Barney escaped from Old Mill Prison in Plymouth, England.

== American Civil War ==
- November 1863 – Confederate General John Hunt Morgan and six of his officers escaped from the Ohio Penitentiary.
- February 9 and 10, 1864 – Libby Prison escape. More than 100 Union prisoners broke out of Libby Prison in Richmond, Virginia. Fifty-nine of them reached freedom, forty-eight were recaptured, and two drowned.

== Second Boer War ==
- December 12, 1899 – Winston Churchill. A war correspondent at the time, the future Prime Minister of the United Kingdom was captured by the Boers while accompanying a British scouting expedition. His successful escape made him a minor national celebrity.

== World War I ==
- October 1914 – French officer Henri Giraud was captured by the Germans in August and escaped in October. He also escaped in World War II, this time as a general (see next section).
- July 4, 1915 – Gunther Plüschow escaped from a POW camp at Donington Park, Leicestershire, England, and made his way back to Germany. This was the only successful escape from Britain back to Germany in either world war. (During World War II, Franz von Werra escaped from Canada and rejoined the Luftwaffe, while a few others escaped from American camps, but remained in the United States.)
- September 2 and 12, 1918 – John Owen Donaldson and another prisoner escaped, but were recaptured. The pair were joined by three others for a second try a few days later. Donaldson reached the Netherlands in October.
- February 1917 – October 1918 – E. H. Jones, a Welsh lieutenant in the Indian Army, and C. W. Hill, an Australian officer in the Royal Flying Corps, escaped from a Turkish prisoner-of-war camp at Yozgat. Having first pretended to be psychic, the pair spent over a year conning the camp's commandant. Eventually they persuaded their Turkish captors they were insane and, after being moved to a hospital for the mentally ill in the summer of 1918, the two men played their roles as lunatics so successfully they also fooled the doctors and were returned home.
- February 14, 1918 – French fighter pilot Roland Garros escaped to rejoin the French army after several attempts.
- July 23/24, 1918 – Holzminden officers' prisoner-of-war camp. Ten of 29 British officers made their way to freedom, making this "the most successful escape from a German prison camp during the First World War".
- 1918 – US Navy Lieutenant Edouard Izac was taken prisoner aboard the U-boat which sank his ship in May 1918. On the trip to Germany, he learned important information about enemy submarine movements. As a result, he made several attempts to escape, finally succeeding on the night of October 6–7, 1918, with several others. He made his way to Switzerland and then London to pass along the information, though by then the war was nearly over. For his actions, he was awarded the Medal of Honor.

== Polish-Soviet War ==
- Merian C. Cooper, better known as a Hollywood screenwriter, director and producer, formed the Kościuszko Squadron, composed of American volunteers fighting on the Polish side. A pilot in the fighter squadron, he was shot down on July 13, 1920, and taken prisoner. He escaped just before the war ended in 1921 (on his second attempt) and made his way to Latvia.

== Spanish Civil War ==
- On May 22, 1938, 792 or 795 Republican prisoners of war and political prisoners escaped from Fort San Cristóbal, near Pamplona, Spain. Only three managed to reach the French border. The Nationalists recaptured or killed the rest.

== World War II ==
=== Allied ===
- List of attempts to escape Oflag IV-C (better known as Colditz Castle). Fifty-four prisoners reached freedom.
- January 5, 1942 – Airey Neave and Anthony Luteyn successfully escaped from Colditz Castle, Germany, Neave being the first British officer to accomplish this feat.
- April 17, 1942 – French General Henri Giraud, reprising his World War I escape, got out of the high-security Königstein Castle by climbing down a 150-foot (46 m) homemade rope. This escape took two years of preparation (versus two months for his World War I escape). He reached Switzerland, then returned to Vichy France, where he would play a major role during the rest of the war.
- June 1942, September 1944 – Tony Deane-Drummond successfully escaped twice, first from the Italians, then years later from the Germans. He was second-in-command of an airborne raid to destroy an aqueduct in Italy in February 1941. The aqueduct was destroyed, but all the commandoes were captured. Deane-Drummond escaped in December 1941, but was caught. On his second attempt the following June, he managed to reach Switzerland. Returning to England, he later participated in Operation Market Garden in September 1944. With the British force surrounded in the region of Arnhem, he swam across the Rhine River, but was taken prisoner. He escaped the next day and, along with other hiding soldiers, was rescued in Operation Pegasus.
- July 14, 1942 – Eighty-six Soviet prisoners at Majdanek concentration camp, who had arrived the year prior, attempted a mass escape by rushing a lightly defended section of fence. Two were shot, but the other 84 got away.
- November 6, 1942 – At least sixty Soviet POWs at Birkenau participated in a mass escape. The escape involved overpowering SS guards and rushing a part of camp still under construction and not yet fenced off. The escape was organized by several people, including Andrey Pogozhev. Several dozen were able to make it out of the camp, though most were recaptured and returned to camp or summarily executed. Pogozhev, along with another POW he traveled with, Viktor Kyznecov, were among those able to escape recapture. Pogozhev survived the war and wrote his memoirs, Escape from Auschwitz.
- August 30, 1942 – Two Australian and two British soldiers were recaptured and executed after escaping from Changi Prison, Singapore, during the Selarang Barracks incident.
- October 30, 1942 – Fourteen Australians and five New Zealanders escaped from Camp 57 in Italy through a tunnel, but were all recaptured.
- November 1942 to March 1944 – Australian flying ace Nicky Barr was shot down in 1942 in North Africa. A prisoner of the Italians, he escaped and was recaptured three times, but finally led a group to freedom on his fourth try.
- March 29, 1943 – Six British and New Zealand officers escaped through a tunnel from Castello di Vincigliata (Campo 12) near Florence, Italy. Four were recaptured. New Zealand Brigadiers James Hargest and Reginald Miles escaped to Switzerland.
- April 4, 1943 – United States Air Force pilot Samuel Grashio, United States Air Force Lieutenant William Dyess, United States Marines Austin Shofner and Jack Hawkins, six other Americans and two Filipinos escaped from a work camp in Davao Region, the Philippines. This was the only successful mass escape from a Japanese camp. The escape is detailed in the 2010 book Escape from Davao.
- September 8, 1943 – As a youth, Australian author Clive Barry, held in northern Italy, slipped the guards of Campo 106, scaled an eight-foot square barbed wire apron under gunfire, endured near starvation on a four hundred mile trek over the Alps, then was shot and wounded on the French border before making it to Switzerland. Twenty-two years later he would win the inaugural Guardian Fiction Prize for Crumb Borne; a darkly comic novella about an absurd prisoner of war escape.
- October 14, 1943 – Several dozen Soviet prisoners at Sobibor Extermination Camp, all Jewish, led by Lieutenant Alexander Pechersky, who had arrived the month prior, participated in a mass uprising at the camp. Several of the camp staff were killed, and the prisoners fled into the surrounding woods. At least four of Soviet POWs are known to have survived the escape and the ensuing searches, including Pechersky.
- October 29, 1943 – The Wooden Horse escape. Flight Lieutenant Eric Williams and Lieutenant Richard Michael Codner came up with the idea to construct a vaulting horse and dig a tunnel underneath it. Pilot Officer Oliver Philpot was the escape co-ordinator for the hut in which they lived, and joined their escape plot. Once outside of Stalag Luft III, Philpot split off from the other two, as previously agreed upon. All three managed to reach first Sweden, then Britain. Their exploit was the basis of the 1950 film The Wooden Horse, which was written by Williams.
- February 29th, 1944 - RAF Medical Officer, Flight Lieutenant Tom Cullen MBE, and Quartermaster Sergeant John Greig RAMC, escaped from the island Fortress XIV of Stalag XX-A, in Torun. With the help of members of the Polish Home Army, they were later smuggled on to a Swedish coal ship, in the port of Gdynia. While the ship was at sea, they gave themselves up to the crew, and were later handed over to the Swedish authorities in Malmo. They returned to the UK on March 19th 1944, thus completing a successful 'Home Run'. When Tom Cullen died in 2019, at the age of 102 years, he was probably the last surviving Allied airman to have successfully escaped from a German POW camp, and returned to the UK.
- September 1944 – Major Digby Tatham-Warter was wounded by shrapnel and captured during the Battle of Arnhem, but escaped from the hospital with his second-in-command, Captain Tony Frank. With the help of the Dutch Resistance, they joined a large group of escaped soldiers hiding out. On the night of 22–23 October, 138 of them were rescued by Operation Pegasus, including Tatham-Warter.
- August 1944 - Warrant Officer Gordon Thomson Woodroofe escaped from Ziegenhals, Germany, travelling to Wismar before embarking on a ship bound to Sweden (with the help of a crewman), and from Sweden to Scotland. He is the only known New Zealand airman to successfully escape from a POW camp and return to England.
- Captain Charles Upham, the third and last person to be awarded the Victoria Cross twice, attempted so many escapes that he was sent to Oflag IV-C, better known as Colditz Castle, in October 1944.
- April 1945 – British Army Lieutenant Alastair Cram finally succeeded in escaping on his 21st attempt, just one month before the end of the war in Europe.

=== Axis ===
Of the hundreds of thousands of POWs shipped to the United States, only 2,222 tried to escape. There were about 600 escape attempts from Canada during the war, including at least two mass escapes through tunnels. The Angler breakout was the single largest escape attempt orchestrated by German POWs (28) in North America during the war. The December 23, 1944, breakout of 25 Kriegsmarine and merchant seamen from Papago Park, Arizona, was the second largest. In both instances, all escapees were recaptured or killed.

Four German POWs were killed attempting to escape from Canadian prison camps. Three others were wounded. Most escapees tried to reach the United States when it was still neutral, though Karl Heinz-Grund and Horst Liebeck, from the Angler breakout, made it as far as Medicine Hat, Alberta, before being apprehended by the Royal Canadian Mounted Police. The two men had planned to travel to Vancouver, British Columbia, and leave Canada courtesy of the Japanese merchant marine. Only one person ever succeeded in returning to the Axis—Franz von Werra, who reached the then-neutral United States from Canada—though a couple of others settled in the United States under false identities.

- October 7 and December 20, 1940, January 21, 1941 – On his first (solo) attempt from camp Grizedale Hall, Franz von Werra was recaptured on October 12. His second involved four others, who were quickly caught. He was recaptured while trying to steal an airplane. He was then shipped from Great Britain to Canada, where, on his third attempt, he jumped out the window of a moving train. Seven others were recaptured. Von Werra made his way first to the United States, still neutral at that time, then to Mexico (before he could be extradited back to Canada), and eventually to Nazi Germany. He is the only German World War II POW to escape and return to Germany. (However, see below the April 29, 1944, escape to Tibet.)
- April 18, 1941 – Twenty-eight Germans escaped from Angler, Ontario, through a 150-foot-long (46 m) tunnel. Originally over 80 had planned to escape, but Canadian guards discovered the breakout in progress. Two prisoners were killed and the rest recaptured.
- November 23, 1941, December 1941 and February 18, 1942 – Luftwaffe Oberleutnant and ace Ulrich Steinhilper escaped from Bowmanville, Ontario, and managed to make it to Niagara Falls within two days. Steinhilper unknowingly spent 30 minutes in the neutral United States clinging beneath a train car as it sat idle in a Buffalo, New York, railyard. In less than three weeks, he escaped again and made it as far as Montreal, Quebec. Within four months, Steinhilper attempted a third escape. On February 18, 1942, Steinhilper and a friend, disguised as painters, used a ladder to escape over two barbed wire fences. The pair got as far as Watertown, New York, before being arrested by police. Steinhilper was soon sent to Gravenhurst, Ontario, where he attempted two further escapes.
- November 24, 1941 – RAF Carlisle, United Kingdom. Luftwaffe pilots Heinz Schnabel and Harry Wappler stole a Miles Magister trainer aircraft and flew to several other RAF airfields before being recaptured.
- April 17, 1942, and October 1943 – Dornier Do 17 bomber pilot Oberleutnant Peter Krug made it as far as San Antonio, Texas, from the Bowmanville, Ontario, POW camp. The young Luftwaffe pilot was aided in his flight by Axis sympathizers in the United States whose addresses may have been procured from outside Abwehr sources. His second escape was from Gravenhurst, Ontario; he was reported caught after 24 hours in the October 5, 1943 North Bay Nugget.
- November 1, 1942 – Four Germans—Bruno Dathe, Willy Michel, Hermann Runne and Johannes Grantz—escaped from Fort Stanton, New Mexico, and were captured two days later after a brief skirmish with a posse of ranchers and cattlemen. One escapee was wounded.
- January 1943 – Camp 354, Kenya. Italian POW Felice Benuzzi convinced two of his fellow inmates, Dr. Giovanni Balletto and Enzo Barsotti, to try an unusual escape route: climbing nearby Mount Kenya. After 18 days, they gave up and sneaked back into camp. After the war, Benuzzi wrote of his experience in No Picnic on Mount Kenya.
- January 6, March 13, April 18 and another attempt, all in 1943 – Karl Rabe of U-35 made four separate escape attempts from Lethbridge, Alberta, Canada, including one using a 24-by-10-foot (7.3 m × 3.0 m) home-made hot air balloon. Previously he had escaped from a Toronto hospital, subsequently stealing a small row boat with the intention of crossing Lake Ontario to the American shore, but beached the craft too soon, mistakenly thinking he was already on the American side. He was immediately recaptured by Canadian soldiers.
- August 26, 1943 – Nineteen German POWs escaped through a large drainage pipe from Kingston, Ontario, Canada. All were soon recaptured.
- 1943 – Bowmanville POW camp, Canada. In Operation Kiebitz, Admiral Karl Dönitz sent the submarine U-536 to pick up four U-boat commanders, including noted ace Otto Kretschmer, who were to break out at the right time. The Canadians were aware of the attempt, but let it proceed, hoping to lure in the U-boat. However, the plan was aborted when the part of a tunnel collapsed, revealing its exit to the guards. Instead, another U-boat commander, Wolfgang Heyda, escaped over a barbed wire fence and made his way 1,400 kilometres (870 mi) to the rendezvous point. Here he was captured, while the authorities waited for the U-boat to surface. Despite being spotted by three destroyers, it got away.
- April 29, 1944 - Heinrich Harrer, Peter Aufschnaiter, Hans Kopp and four others escaped from a British camp in Dehradun. Harrer and Aufschnaiter reached Lhasa and stayed with the Dalai Lama for seven years, finally escaping from Tibet ahead of the People's Liberation Army in 1950. Rolf Magener and Heins von Have went east, passing through Burma and across the front line to reach Japanese troops. They reached Japan after four months on the run, but only returned to Germany two years after the end of the war.
- August 5, 1944 – Cowra breakout, Australia. 359 Japanese POWs escaped in one of the largest breakouts of the war. All who were not killed or did not commit suicide were caught.
- August 8, 1944 – Von Werra's Swanwick digging partner, Luftwaffe Lieutenant Walter Manhard, successfully escaped from a Gravenhurst, Ontario, POW camp. Presumed drowned, he gave himself up to New York state authorities in 1952. By then, he was married to a United States Navy officer.
- c. August 30, 1944 – Deutsches Afrikakorps (DAK) soldier Max Weidauer escaped from Medicine Hat, Alberta, after he came under suspicion by Nazi elements controlling the camp and the subsequent murder of fellow DAK prisoner August Plaszek. After explaining the circumstances of his escape and the fact that he feared for his life, Weidauer was hidden by a local farmer, but was soon once again behind barbed wire, though in a different camp.
- December 15, 1944 - Ninety-seven Italians escaped from Camp 14 at Doonfoot, Ayr, Scotland. When the Italian fascist regime collapsed in July 1943, the new Italian government signed an armistice with the Allies. Most Italian POWs held in the UK were released, but a few were identified as committed fascists and were detained at Camp 14. After some unrest in the camp, the breakout occurred through a short tunnel. They were all recaptured within a week.
- December 24, 1944 – Papago Park, United States. Twenty-five prisoners got out through a tunnel, but all were recaptured, U-boat commander Jürgen Wattenberg being the last on January 28, 1945.
- March 10, 1945 – Island Farm, Wales. 84 prisoners escaped. All but three were recaptured.
- September 22, 1945 – German POW Georg Gärtner escaped from Camp Deming, New Mexico, after the war had ended by crawling under two gates and jumping onto a passing freight train. Gaertner, who spoke good English, was able to pass for an American and worked as a ski instructor in the winter and a tennis instructor in the summer and married an American woman. In 1985 he finally turned himself in, after 40 years of freedom. No charges were filed against him, and he was allowed to remain in the United States and become a naturalized citizen.

== Korean War ==
- June 14, 2008 – Kim Jin-soo. Captured in 1953 by North Korea, this South Korean soldier eventually settled down, married and raised a family. Fifty-five years after his capture, the 74-year-old Kim escaped to China.

== Vietnam War ==
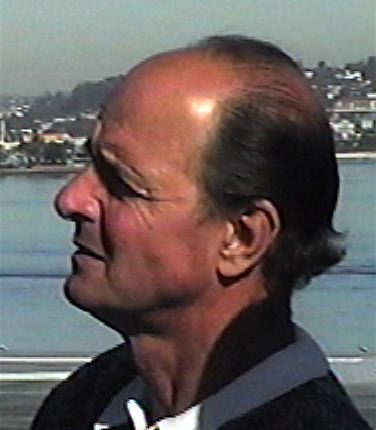
Dieter Dengler

- June 29, 1966 – Dieter Dengler, Pisidhi Indradat, Duane W. Martin, Eugene DeBruin, Prasit Promsuwan (a Thai), Prasit Thanee (a Thai), and Y. C. To (a Nationalist Chinese) escaped from a Pathet Lao camp in Laos. U.S. Navy pilot Dengler was rescued on July 20. Martin was killed (according to Dengler) outside of a Laotian village. The others were recaptured. Indradat, a civilian, was freed by Laotian soldiers later; the remaining prisoners were never seen again.
- April 10, 1967, and May 10, 1969 – U.S. Air Force Captain John A. Dramesi bailed out of his stricken aircraft over North Vietnam on April 2, 1967. Eight days later he eluded his North Vietnamese captors by dismantling the side of his cell. He was recaptured the following day. After a year of planning, Dramesi and another POW aviator escaped again, by slipping through a hole in the roof. After traveling 3 miles in 12 hours, Dramesi and his companion were recaptured. He was released in 1973. Dramesi had plans for a third escape. He wrote a memoir, Code of Honor, telling of his escapes and time held captive.
- September 1967 – U.S. Air Force Major Bud Day was shot down and captured by the local North Vietnamese militia. After days of torture, he escaped, making his way back to South Vietnam. He was however recaptured within sight of an American base camp, and endured five years and seven months more of captivity. Day was awarded the Medal of Honor for his exploits.
- December 25, 1967 – U.S Air Force Lieutenant Lance Sijan was shot down and evaded capture for 46 days with a fractured skull, a mangled right hand, and a compound fracture of the left leg, no food nor survival kit and little water. He was captured but quickly escaped from a North Vietnamese Army camp after incapacitating a guard. Sijan was captured several hours later and died in Hỏa Lò Prison from his injuries. He was posthumous awarded the Medal of Honor and promoted to captain after his death.
- December 31, 1968 – James N. Rowe, a Special Forces second lieutenant, was captured on October 29, 1963. After five years of captivity and torture, he was about to be executed when he overpowered a guard and was picked up by a U.S. helicopter. Rowe was awarded the Silver Star.
- 12 October 1967 – Lieutenant Colonel George G. McKnight, a prisoner of war in North Vietnam, "executed an escape from a solitary confinement cell by removing the door bolt brackets from his door. Colonel McKnight knew the outcome of his escape attempt could be severe reprisal or loss of his life. He succeeded in making it through a section of housing, then to the Red River and swam down river all night. The next morning he was recaptured, severely beaten, and put into solitary confinement for two and a half years".

== Indo-Pakistani war of 1971 ==
- July 1971 - Pakistani office Ikram Sehgal escaped from the Panagarh POW camp in India.

== See also ==
- Kugel-erlass, a secret Nazi decree regarding the punishment of recaptured Allied POWs

== Sources ==
- Wilson, Peter (2011). The Thirty Years War: Europe's Tragedy. London: Belknap Press. ISBN 978-0-674-06231-3.
- Carl von Landmann (1876). "Kratz zu Scharffenstein, Johann Philipp Graf (1. Artikel)" . Allgemeine Deutsche Biographie (in German). Vol. 4. Leipzig: Duncker & Humblot. pp. 573–575.
