= List of World War II prisoner-of-war camps in Canada =

There were 40 known prisoner-of-war camps across Canada during World War II, although this number also includes internment camps that held Canadians of German and Japanese descent. Several reliable sources indicate that there were only 25 or 26 camps holding exclusively prisoners from foreign countries, nearly all from Germany.

The camps were identified by letters at first, then by numbers. In addition to the main camps there were branch camps and labour camps. The prisoners were given various tasks; many worked in the forests as logging crews or on nearby farms; they were paid a nominal amount for their labour. Approximately 11,000 were thus employed by 1945.

The largest number of military prisoners of war was recorded as 33,798 by several sources. In addition to POWs, some civilian internees were held in the camps and some estimates include such prisoners.

All POWs were protected by the conditions of the Geneva Convention. There are claims that conditions in the Canadian camps tended to be better than average, and many times better than the conditions of the barracks that Canadian troops were kept in. They were guarded by the Veterans Guard of Canada, mostly men who had been soldiers during WW I. It is believed by some that the lenient treatment foiled many escape attempts before they even started. It is told that a group of German prisoners returned to Ozada camp after escaping because of encountering a grizzly bear. Starting in 1945, all POWs were released and returned to their home countries. None were allowed to remain in Canada, but some later returned as immigrants.

Camp	Place	Province	Relative Location	Specific Location	Period
10	Chatham	Ontario	260 km southwest of Toronto		1944; 1945–1946
10	Fingal	Ontario	40 km south of London		1945–1946
20 (C)	Gravenhurst	Ontario	170 km north of Toronto		1940–1946
21 (F)	Espanola	Ontario	330 km NNW of Toronto		1940–1943
22 (M)	Mimico	Ontario	15 km west of Toronto		1940–1944
23 (Q)	Monteith (near Iroquois Falls)	Ontario	700 km north of Toronto		1940–1946
30	Bowmanville	Ontario	65 km ENE of Toronto	2020 Lambs Road, Clarington, ON	1941–1945
31 (F)	Kingston	Ontario	145 km SSW of Ottawa		1940–1943
32 (H)	Hull	Quebec	10 km north of Ottawa		1941–1947
33 (F)	Petawawa	Ontario	130 km WNW of Ottawa		1942–1946
40 (A)	Farnham	Quebec	50 km ESE of Montreal	825 Rue Principale O, Farnham, QC	1940–1941; 1942–1943; 1944–1946
42 (N)	Newington (Sherbrooke)	Quebec	130 km east of Montreal	990 Rue Bowen S, Sherbrooke, QC	1942–1946
43	Ile Ste Helene, Montreal	Quebec			1940–1943
44	Feller College / Grande Ligne	Quebec	56 km southeast of Montreal		1943–1946
45	Sorel	Quebec	65 km NNE of Montreal		1945–1946
70 (B)	Fredericton (Ripples)	New Brunswick	20 km east of Fredericton	2999 NB-10, Sheffield Parish, NB	1941–1945
100 (W)	Neys	Ontario	1100 km northwest of Toronto		1944–1943; 1944-1946
101 (X)	Angler	Ontario	800 km northwest of Toronto		1941–1946
130	Seebe	Alberta	100 km west of Calgary		1939–1946
132	Medicine Hat	Alberta	260 km ESE of Calgary	2055 21 Ave SE, Medicine Hat, AB	1943–1945
133	Ozada	Alberta	130 km west of Calgary		1942
133	Lethbridge	Alberta	160 km southeast of Calgary		1942–1946
?	Chisholm	Alberta	180 km N of Edmonton		?
135	Wainwright	Alberta	190 km ESE of Edmonton		1945–1946
(R)	Red Rock	Ontario	Lake Superior		1940–1941
?	Whitewater	Manitoba	300 km NW of Winnipeg	Riding Mountain National Park	1943–1945
N/A	Wainfleet	Ontario	Close to Port Colborne		1943–1945

== German prisoners ==
- Georg Hees

== See also ==
- List of World War I prisoner-of-war camps in Canada
- Lac Saint-Jean
