= Tailormade =

- Genre: Radio drama
- Running time: 1 hour
- Country of origin: Australia
- Language: English
- Syndicates: ABC
- Written by: Clive Barry
- Recording studio: Sydney
- Original release: 1 March 1953

Tailormade is a comedic radio play by Clive Barry, broadcast in Australia in 1953, and popular in its time.

== Premise ==
Our racketeering narrator, Signor Sardonic—a self-confessed "blue-jawed postwar parasite"—meets Australian tourist Mr. Horse—seemingly "a fairly simple sort of cove"—who is driving a London taxi cab up the Adriatic coastline. Together they strike up a conversation with a blonde artist from Switzerland, Anna.

Horse returns as the protagonist of Barry's second and final piece for radio—Key Fee.

== Original Cast ==
- Lionel Stevens as Sardonic
- Sidney Chambers as Horse
- Dinah Shearing as Anna
- Alastair Duncan as Ciccio
- Rod Taylor as Vendor
