= Clive Barry =

Australian writer

Clive Stephen Barry
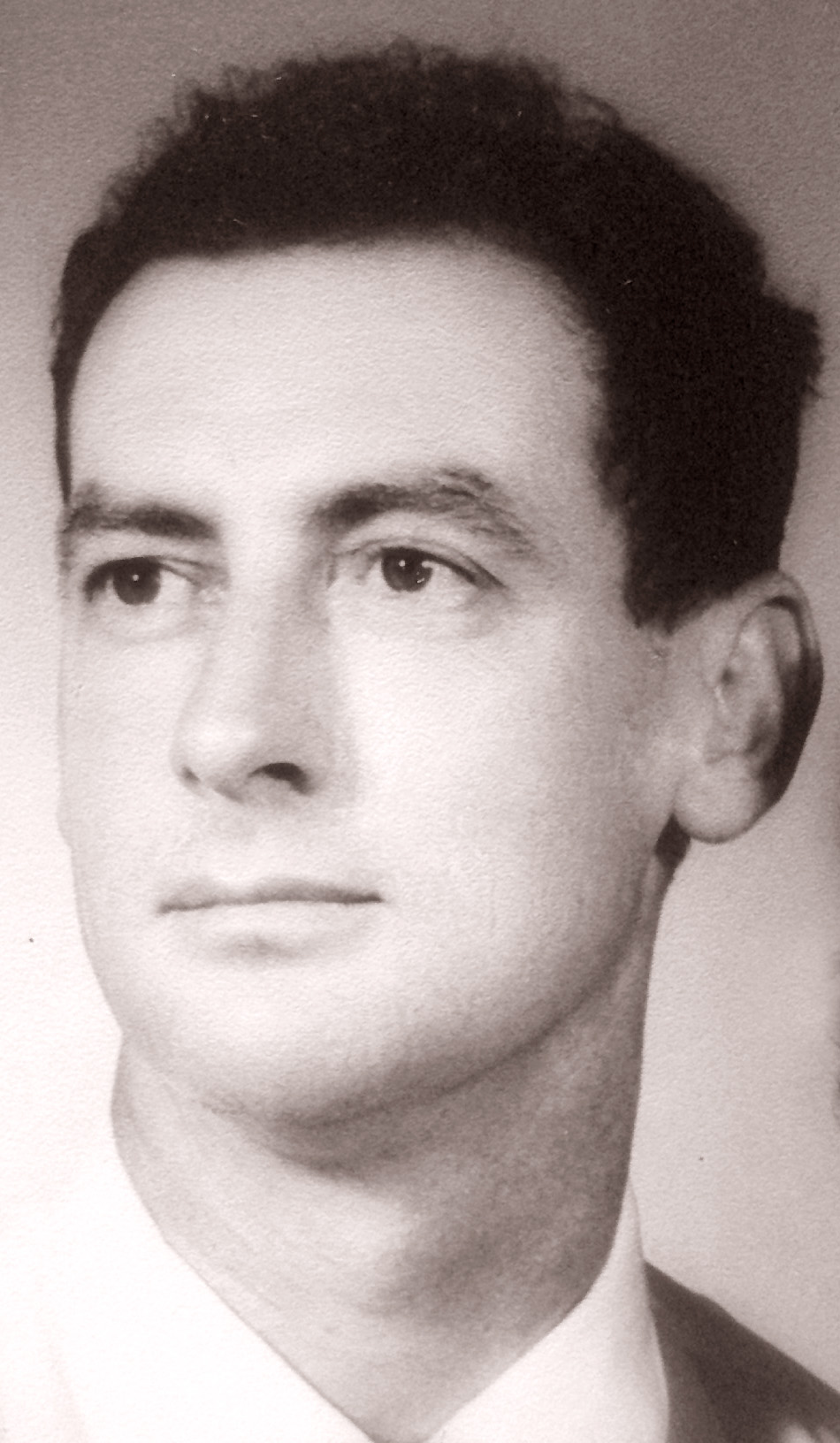
- Barry in 1958
- Born: Clive Stephen Barry; 2 September 1922; Manly, Sydney, Australia
- Died: 25 August 2003 (aged 80); Mosman, Sydney, Australia
- Occupations: Novelist, playwright
- Writing career
- Genres: Black Humour, Absurdism, Satire
- Notable works: The Spear Grinner (1963); Crumb Borne (1965)
- Notable awards: Guardian Fiction Prize

Signature
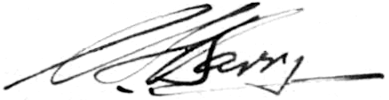

Clive Barry (2 September 1922 – 25 August 2003) was an Australian author, playwright, cartoonist and escaped prisoner of war. His offbeat, vividly stylised prose—characterised by deadpan wit, surreal violence and a macabre playfulness—gave him brief cult status in the 1960s.

He won the first ever Guardian Fiction Prize for Crumb Borne—a unique, spasmodically weird prisoner-of-war novella—likened to "swifter more sharply visual Beckett;" the literary equivalent of an expressionist cartoon laced with the strange, visceral humour of early Nabokov.

Wilfully elusive, Barry declined to even attend his own prize ceremony, remaining in Africa—the setting for his two other books: The Spear Grinner and Fly Jamskoni. He regarded his infatuation with the Mother Continent as "a suitable reward for a dissolute life."

== Early life ==
Aged just seventeen—but with his birth date falsified to meet the minimum enlistment age of twenty—Barry joined the 2/13th Battalion to fight in World War II. He became one of The Rats of Tobruk, going missing in action during the famous siege, and subsequently being imprisoned by, whom he considered, the "emotional, and often brutal" Italians in campo 106. He escaped two years later, slipping past his [by now] demoralised captors to traverse an eight-foot square barbed wire apron under desultory gunfire, then traipsed for four hundred miles over the Alps, malnourished; surviving on grapes and, infrequently, milk donated by peasants. He was shot in the shoulder on the French border, fled to a nunnery to have the wound tended to, then finally crossed into Switzerland for bullet extraction and skiing.

Decades later, his escapology as a prisoner-of-war would re-emerge—warped absurdly—in the plot of Crumb Borne.

== Selected works ==
=== Novels ===
- The Spear Grinner (1963)
- Crumb Borne (1965)
- Fly Jamskoni (1969)

=== Radio plays ===
- Tailormade (1953)
- Key Fee (1953)

=== Short stories ===
- Sable Fable (1951)
- Hamburg Reunion (1951)
- Smooge Stooge (1952)
- Shady Lady (1952)
- Chalice Malice (1952)
- Scamper-Vamper (1952)
- Boy Blond (1953)
- The Busker and the Mademoiselle (1953)
- Pastel Veils (1953)
- Frugal (1956)
- Hyena-Bait (1958)
- Bark Ring (1959)
- Rhino Ground (1959)
- Long Dry (1959)
- Fish Bomb (1960)
- The Ten Inch Safari (1965)
- Two or three thousand stars did absolutely nothing (1966)

== See also ==
- Lists of solved missing person cases
- List of prisoner-of-war escapes
