= Ulrich Steinhilper =

German Luftwaffe fighter ace

- Born: 14 September 1918; Stuttgart, Germany
- Died: 20 October 2009 (aged 91); Stuttgart, Germany
- Military career
- Allegiance: Nazi Germany
- Branch: Luftwaffe
- Rank: Oberleutnant
- Units: Jagdgeschwader 433; I/JG 52
- Conflicts: World War II; Battle of France; Battle of Britain
- Other work: IBM salesman

Ulrich Steinhilper (14 September 1918 – 20 October 2009) was a World War II Luftwaffe fighter ace who made numerous attempts to escape after he was shot down and captured. As a post-war IBM typewriter salesman, he was an early proponent of word processing, considered by some to have either coined the phrase or even originated the concept.

== Early life ==
Steinhilper was born in Stuttgart, Germany, during a World War I air raid. His father was a teacher.

In 1936, he was allowed to graduate early from high school after passing the test for Luftwaffe flight training.

== World War II ==
=== Luftwaffe ace ===
He earned his Pilotenabzeichen (Pilot's Badge) and in 1939 was assigned to Jagdgeschwader (fighter wing) 433, where he was Adolf Galland's adjutant. As the youngest officer, he was also made the Staffel Nachrichtenoffizier (communications officer), a job no one else wanted (or even knew much about). Steinhilper learned that he was supposed to provide pilots with ground-to-ground and ground-to-air communications using two 1.5 kilowatt radio stations and two field telephone units. He tried hard to promote the use of radios, but most pilots were against the idea, among them Galland, considering the equipment an unnecessary additional weight and the concept a waste of their time. Steinhilper managed to demonstrate the advantages during a large training exercise commanded by General Hugo Sperrle involving a simulated bombing attack on Stuttgart, only to have the results dismissed by Galland and ignored by the rest.

His unit, now redesignated I/JG 52, was assigned to protect the Ruhr region in the west during the 1939 invasion of Poland in the east. Steinhilper saw sporadic combat in the Battle of France, flying a Messerschmitt Bf 109 fighter. Beginning in August 1940, he participated in the Battle of Britain. In two months, he flew over 150 sorties against England, seven in a single day. He became an ace. He destroyed two or three Spitfires on the ground at RAF Manston on 19 August, but it was not until 19 September that he got his first aerial victory, another Spitfire. According to one source, his other four aerial victims were two Spitfires on 24 September, another on 30 September, and a Bristol Blenheim on 4 October. He later described a 30 September mission in which his and other fighter Gruppen were assigned to escort Junkers Ju 88 bombers to London (which they were unable to locate). Many Bf 109 fighters ran out of fuel while returning to base, forcing their pilots to bale out over the English Channel; Steinhilper claimed to have seen a secret memorandum which stated that 19 of these pilots drowned.

Steinhilper was shot down on 27 October over Canterbury by Sergeant Bill Skinner of 74 Squadron, and made a prisoner of war after parachuting to safety. (The "substantial remains" of Oberleutnant Steinhilper's Bf 109E were recovered in 1980 and are displayed in the Dowding Memorial Hangar of the Kent Battle of Britain Museum.)

=== Escape attempts ===
In January 1941, he was sent across the Atlantic Ocean to Canada to be interned in Camp W (later renamed 100) in Neys, Ontario, or Camp 30 in Bowmanville, Ontario. He made his first escape on 23 November, remaining at large for two days before being recaptured at Niagara Falls, Ontario. He tried again several weeks later, managing to reach Montreal's Windsor Station. On his third attempt, on 18 February 1942, he and his friend Albert Waller made it to Watertown, New York, United States, before being caught. He was then transferred to Camp 20 in Gravenhurst, Ontario, where he made two further unsuccessful breakouts.

After the end of the war in 1945, he was returned to Germany and released in late 1946.

== IBM and later life ==
Post-war, he worked at several jobs before being hired by IBM Germany. As an IBM typewriter salesman, he coined the word "Textverarbeitung" ("word processing") in 1955. A number of sources even credit him with originating the concept. However, Thomas Haig, an assistant professor in the University of Wisconsin–Milwaukee's School of Information Studies, wrote in the IEEE Annals of the History of Computing that the English term preceded the German, though he conceded that the latter "was the first to achieve any currency". Steinhilper tried to get IBM Germany interested in the concept, but without much success. In 1971, when the idea finally began to be accepted, IBM gave him an Outstanding Achievement Award and a trip around the world in recognition of "having authored and promoted it."

He wrote four autobiographical books. They were published in English. A Spitfire on My Tail, Ten Minutes to Buffalo and Full Circle detail his wartime experiences, while Don't Talk – Do It! covers his post-war life. The first three were also published in German.

Ulrich Steinhilper died on 20 October 2009 at the age of 91 in his native Stuttgart.
