= Neys Provincial Park =

Provincial park in Ontario, Canada

- IUCN category II (national park)
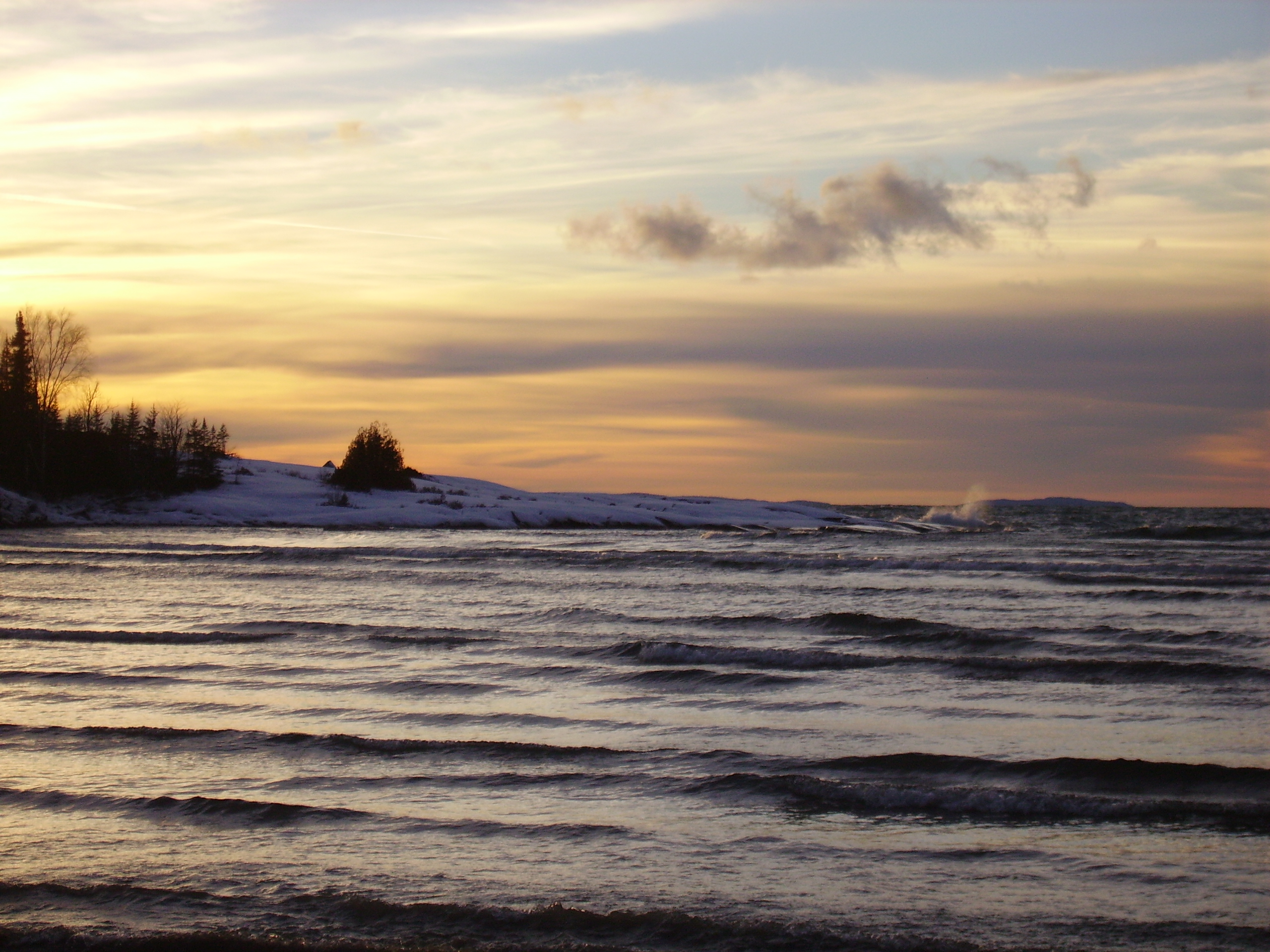

- Location within Ontario
- Interactive map of Neys Provincial Park
- Location: Thunder Bay District, Ontario, Canada
- Nearest city: Marathon
- Coordinates: 48°45′00″N 86°35′00″W
- Area: 5,383 ha (13,300 acres)
- Established: 1965
- Visitors: 38,608 (in 2022)
- Governing body: Ontario Parks
- Website: www.ontarioparks.ca/park/neys

Neys Provincial Park is a natural environment-class provincial park on the north shore of Lake Superior, just west of Marathon, Ontario, Canada. This 5,383-hectare (13,300-acre) park includes the historic Coldwell Peninsula and the surrounding island system (added as part of Ontario's Living Legacy in 2000–2001), consisting of Pic Island, Detention Island, and the Sullivan Islands. Within park boundaries is also the muse for Group of Seven member Lawren Harris, who in 1924 painted the now-famous image of Pic Island.

Flora and fauna in the park include many hardy species of subarctic plants and a rare herd of woodland caribou. The park is home to one of the most popular beaches on Lake Superior’s north shore and a model of a former German prisoner of war Camp at the Neys Visitor Centre.

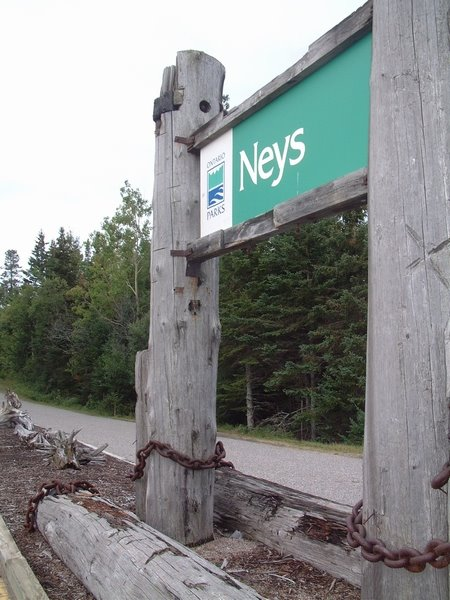
Park sign on Highway 17, west of Marathon, Ontario

== Port Coldwell ==
The ghost village of Port Coldwell, which lies just outside the park's east boundary, was home to an old railway and fishing community. Around 1879 Norwegian fisherman Ben Almos and his partner LeSarge arrived at the harbour. T.B. Van Every erected a large ice-house with freezer in 1887, shipping south by rail the catch of six boats. By the 1890's Port Coldwell had become a regular port of call for the Beatty and Collingwood line of steamers and a fleet of 11 or 12 boats was docked at the harbour, including tugs of M. McInnes, A.B. Sutherland, Robert Jackson, A. Morrison and John Morrison. The pace of settlement accelerated and by 1904 14 men were employed in the Coldwell fisheries. From Port Burwell (Lake Erie) came Captains Foster and E.D.M. Titus, owners of the first ice-making machine on Lake Superior. Among Captain Titus's earliest employees was A.W. Nuttall, later a pioneer of the Black Bay fisheries and a fisheries overseer. The pre-World War I years also brought William Dampier, Charles Miller, Allan and Donald Murray, and Charles "Tink" Winterton. Prior to 1915, many fishermen sold their catch to the Dominion Fish Company (Booth Fisheries Company) or the Nipigon Bay Fish Company of Rossport. However, the company founded that year by the Nicoll brothers (Thomas, Charlie, Fred, Jack and Frank), formerly of Collingwood, galvanized the Port Coldwell industry, curbed influence of the American Booth Company monopoly, and remained the life force of the town until the late 1950's and the arrival of the sea lamprey and collapse of the fisheries. All that remains of the village now are a few foundations, shipwrecks in the harbour and a cemetery.

== Natural features ==
=== Coldwell Complex ===
Neys Provincial Park is home to one of the hardest and rarest mineral complexes in North America. The Coldwell Complex began to form over 1 billion years ago when magma chambers formed beneath the surface causing surface swelling to occur. Eventually this swelling turned into an active volcano. 600 million years ago, the volcano walls became so large and heavy, they caved in on the volcano, acting as a plug. The magma then became trapped in the magma chamber where it settles and cools with other minerals causing the initial phases of the complex. 66 million years ago, glaciers began to recede, stripping away the top layers of the volcano. Today, the once hot magama chamber is exposed surface rock on the northern shore of Lake Superior. The park has a 2.5 km linear trail. There used to be interpretive plaques however they were removed in 2018 due to weathering inhibiting the legibility.

=== The inhospitable shore of Lake Superior ===
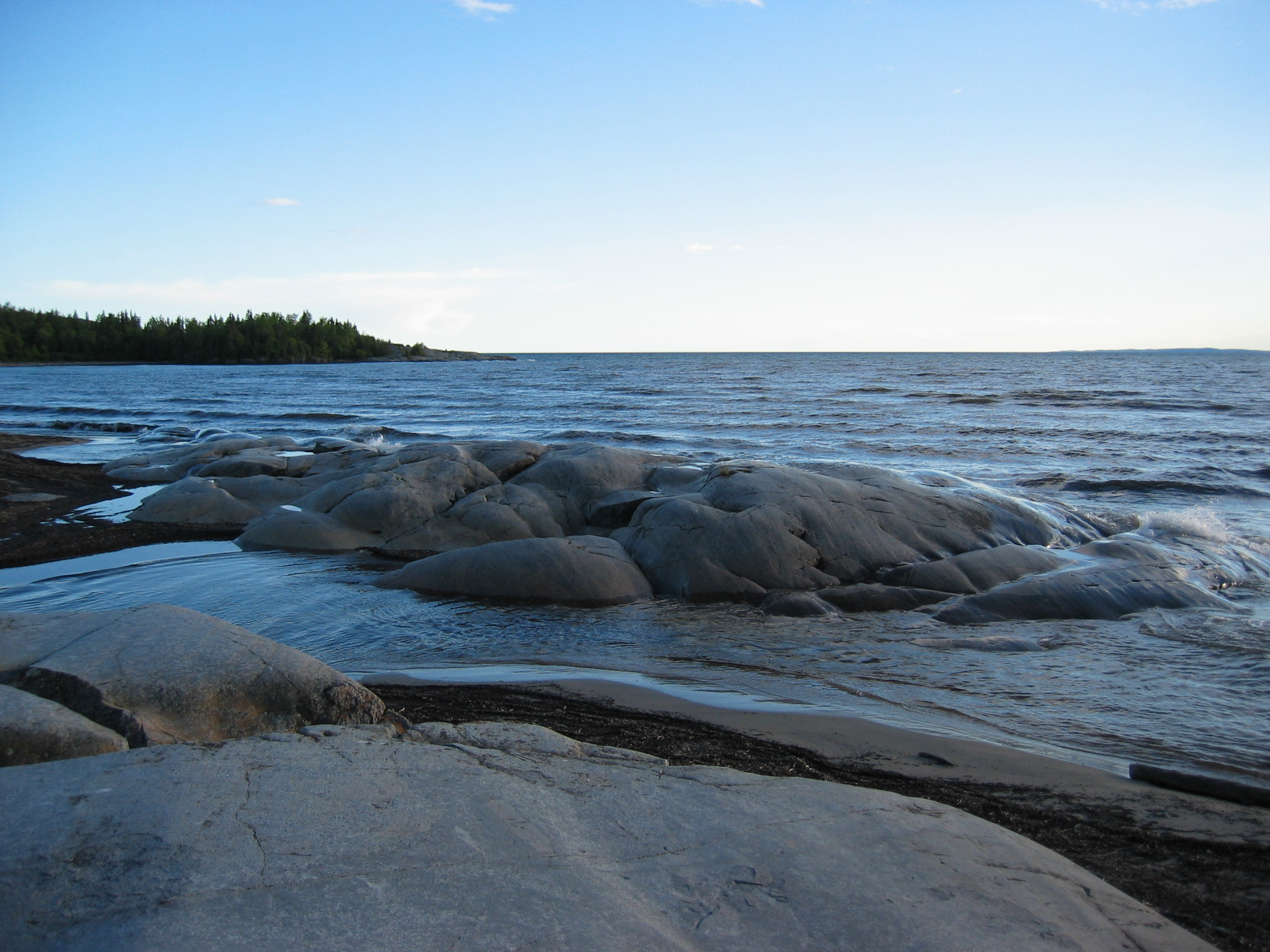
The shore of Lake Superior in Neys Provincial Park

Lake Superior has been the reason for part of the early cultural heritage of Northern Ontario. It is also the cause of one of the most interesting parts of the natural heritage of the region as well. 7,500 years ago, the large Glaciers of the Laurentide Ice Sheet had finally melted away, filling in large bodies of water that covered 246,050 km². These bodies of water are the Great Lakes. The extremely cold and rough waters of Lake Superior have caused its rocky shores to be home to subarctic plant species. The following is a description of the region from the Natural Heritage Information Centre, Ontario Ministry of Natural Resources:

The rocky shore vegetation is an association of lichens, mosses and herbs that can tolerate the severe growing conditions of this site. These plants are able to survive in a microclimate that is cooler, windier and moister than those of nearby areas which are not as strongly influenced by Lake Superior. Lichens cover the bare, wave-washed rocks while the herbs are restricted to cracks and crevices in the rocks where soil has been able to accumulate. Many of these plants such as the butterwort, the three toothed cinquefoil, crowberry and bird’s eye primrose are not found elsewhere in the park and are part of a vegetation association known as an Arctic disjunct community, that is, the discrete association isolated from its main geographical location. Source: NHIC (OMNR)

The whaleback barge 115 wrecked on Pic Island in 1899.

=== Forest vegetation ===
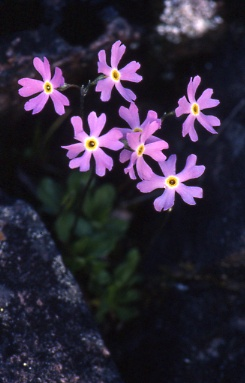
Birds Eye Primrose, Sub Arctic plant of Neys Provincial Park

Neys is within the Central Boreal Forest Region of Ontario. As such it is home to a predominantly coniferous forest, however some boreal deciduous species can be found near waterways and former beaver dams. The park is also home to a large plantation of Red Pine. Park Naturalists theorise that these trees were planted by the Boy Scouts of Canada in the early-mid 1960s. The age of the trees and the fact that Boy Scouts did in fact plant nothing but Red Pines all across Canada as their "Centennial Project" in the 1960s backs this theory up. The Red Pines are not natural to the park eco-system, however, as they are planted in an inhospitable sand dune micro-environment of the park. This dune environment was previously disturbed (flattened and built upon) with the construction of the Neys Prisoner of War Camp (Neys Camp 100, Camp W).

The forests of Neys are home to a wide variety of species of flora and fauna. Some of the most common plant species include the Bunchberry, Labrador Tea, blueberry, bearberry, larch, mountain maple, and a wide variety of fungi. These plants are an attraction to such forest species as the Woodland Caribou, Moose, and the Black Bear.

== Neys Camp 100 ==
During World War II, 35,046 prisoners of war and Japanese-Canadians were interned in 26 main camps in Canada. The north shore of Lake Superior was the site of three such camps: Neys, Angler, and Red Rock.

Neys Camp 100 interned mostly German POWs, and some Japanese-Canadians between 1941-1946. The prisoners were forced to log in the Pic and Little Pic River valleys.

German POWs were divided into categories: the "greys" who were largely ordinary soldiers, and the "blacks" who were considered die-hard Nazis, considered high risks for violence or escape attempts. Neys Camp 100 was one of Canada's nine camps which interned "black" prisoners. Hence the camp was enclosed by three barbed-wire fences and guard towers.

At the end of World War II, Neys was turned into a processing camp for POWs in the northwestern Ontario region. It was then turned into a minimum-security work camp for civilian prisoners from the Thunder Bay area, and finally dismantled in the 1950s.

During the time of the internment camp, there were few, if any, escapes for two main reasons: in summer months, dense forests and heavy, black flies deterred prisoners from walking through the bush, and in the winter, sub-zero cold weather deterred prisoners from venturing out. Also, Lake Superior was a natural barrier, considering its size and frigid waters.

== Logging and the Little Pic River ==
Ontario's forests have historically been used for logging purposes since the first White Pine loggers traversed the Ottawa Valley in the late 17th century. The Neys Region has a more modern logging heritage that is melded with park and national history along with the formation of the town of Marathon, Ontario.

Along the western border of Neys Provincial Park, runs the narrow, and shallow sandy bottomed Little Pic River. The river side was at one point home to dozens of logging camps in the middle of the 20th century. The timber operations in the region were run by an American company known as Marathon Pulp and Paper Mills INC., and a Canadian company of Fort William, the Pigeon Timber Company.

The logging process was quite simple. In the fall, a team of lumberjacks would arrive in the town of Coldwell via the Canadian Pacific Railway. They would then travel up the river to their respective logging camps where they would remain all winter until the spring. The loggers would work all day in woods cutting and felling trees. They would then stack them in cords and then have horses (mid-20th century saw tractors being used in some cases) drag the cords to the shores of the frozen Little Pic River. This process would go on all winter until the spring thaw. Once the rivers path was totally thawed, the loggers would begin the log drive. Using tools such as the peavey, the loggers would ride the logs down the river until they reached the mouth. At the mouth of the Little Pic River there were boom logs which were attached to chains. These chains were attached to rings that are still in the rocks edge at the Little Pic River picnic area. Once the boom rafts were filled with logs, the rafts would be closed and hauled away by tug boats to the Slate Islands where steamers would be waiting to load and transport the logs to the states for processing.

With the loss of the steam engines on the railway, the introduction of the sea lamprey into Lake Superior and the highly anticipated Trans Canada Highway's completion, Northern Ontario was dying. The federal government ordered that all timber which was removed from Canadian forests was to be processed in Canada. In an effort to save time and money, the Marathon Pulp and Paper company decided that it would open a mill and develop its own mill town along the Canadian Pacific Railway. The town was appropriately titled Marathon, by Canada Post. Eventually, the Little Pic River became obsolete as trucks could transport logs from anywhere to the mill with much more ease and less expense.

In the course of the years that the Little Pic River was vital to the Marathon Pulp and Paper company's operation, lumberjacks came in all shapes and sizes. The region saw loggers from southern Ontario, World War II German prisoners of war, and former Japanese interns who were staying at Neys Camp 100 all working for the companies logging on the Little Pic River. For example, in 1943, POWs accounted for 90,000 of the total 98,000 cords of wood harvested by the Pigeon Timber Company.

== Park services and facilities ==
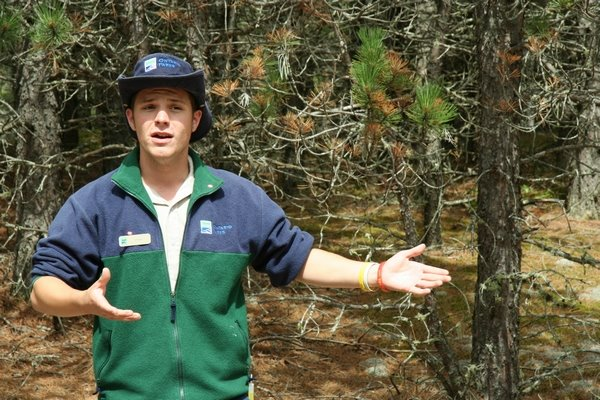
A Park Interpreter on a Guided Hike in 2006

The park offers 144 campsites throughout four campgrounds within the park.

A number of trails through varying terrain exist within a short distance of the four campgrounds including "The Dune Trail" (1 km) through sand dunes and a beaver pond; "The Lookout Trail" (2.5 km, which takes hikers above the campground and has views of the park; "The Point Trail" (1 km), which follows the shore of Lake Superior to a rocky outcropping where boats used to ferry POW lumberjacks are beached; and the "Under the Volcano Trail" (2 km) which extends from the end of the "Point Trail" and follows the coast and includes information about the geological history of the area. "The Tower Trek Trail", a 10.5 km hike that takes approximately 4.5 hours for a round trip, allows access to a view of Pic Island. A coastal trail, currently in development and including some interior camping sites, is in development and can be found at the end of the "Under the Volcano Trail". The park also has two day-use areas, "Prisoner's Cove" and "The Little Pic".
