= Georg Hees =

German translator (1920–2000)

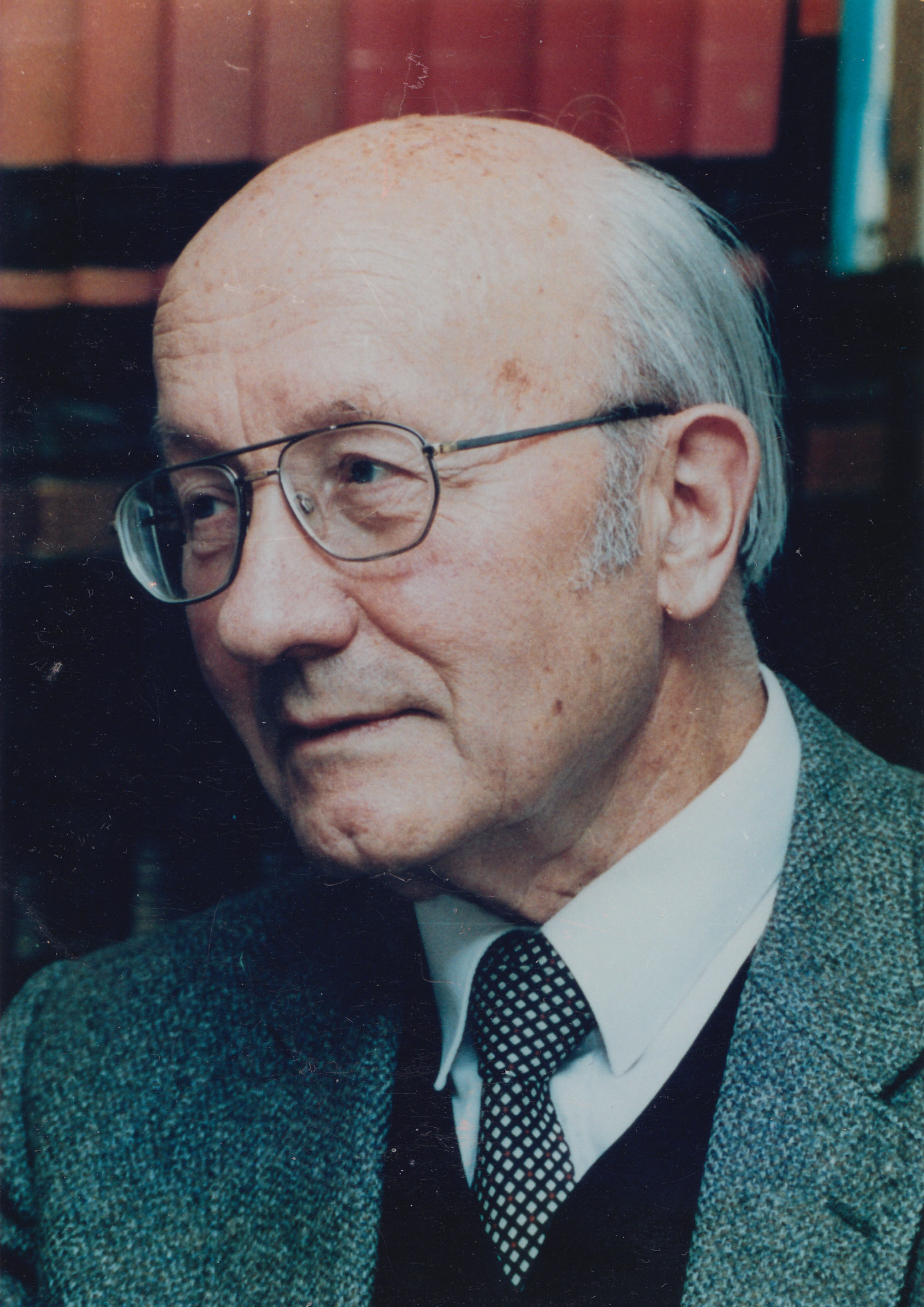
- Hees in early 1980s
- Born: October 12, 1920; Kiel, Germany
- Died: October 23, 2000 (aged 80)
- Occupation: Translator
- Notable work: Dante Alighieri's Divine Comedy

Georg Hees (October 12, 1920 – October 23, 2000) was a German translator, notably of Dante Alighieri's Divine Comedy.

== Life ==
Georg Hees was born in Kiel and graduated from the Realgymnasium in Rostock, where he took Italian as an optional extra subject. After graduating from high school in 1939, he was drafted into military service. Because he spoke Italian fluently, he was sent by the Nazis to North Africa during World War II, as Libya was an Italian colony and Italian-speaking translators were needed there. In 1941, he was taken prisoner by the British and held in several Canadian internment camps, first in Ozada in 1942, then in Lethbridge and Medicine Hat. There he took advantage of the rich educational opportunities available, setting up a university educational institution together with other prisoners. He taught Italian there and spoke a lot about Dante Alighieri. In 1944, he was transferred to Birmingham, where he was allowed to stay with a married couple. In 1946, he was deported to Germany and sent to a prisoner-of-war camp in Hamburg. From 1947 to 1952, he studied Romance philology and philosophy in Hamburg and earned his doctorate under Elena Dabcovich with a dissertation on Brunetto Latini's Tesoretto, which he wrote after his studies in Perugia. In his professional life, he worked as a translator and simultaneous interpreter of mainly English, French, and Italian legal texts in the business sector, including for Hermes Kreditversicherungs AG and the oil company BP. From 1982, he devoted himself to his life's work, translating and annotating Dante's Commedia. In his last years, he gave lectures on Dante and held seminars on Christianity. The documents are preserved in the archives of the Anthroposophical Society in Hamburg.

== Family ==
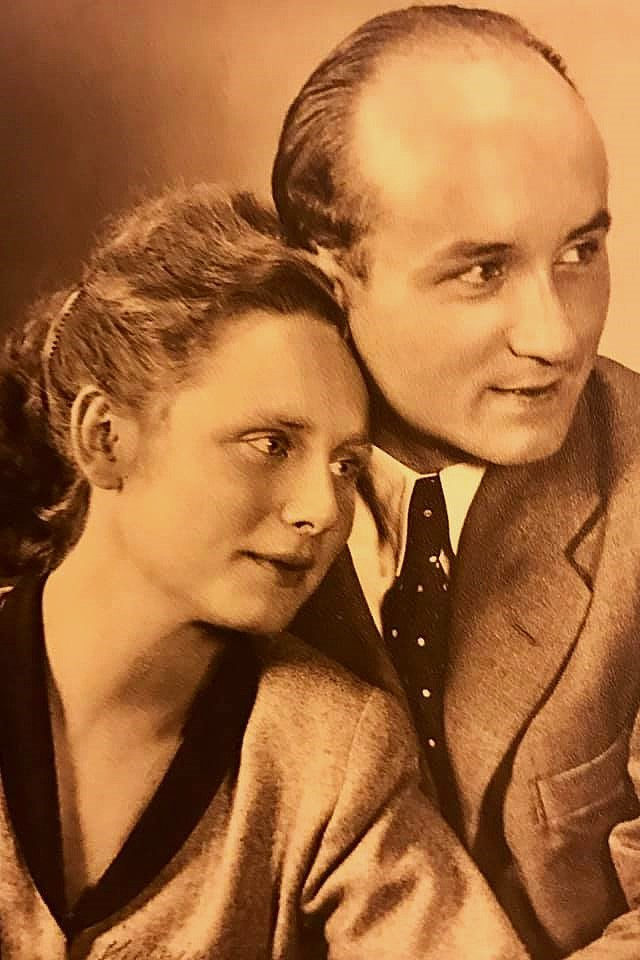
Ingrid and Georg Hees (1949)

Georg Hees married Ingrid Hees, née Borgwardt (September 12, 1924 – April 15, 2017), in 1948, and they had two sons: Michael (born 1951), an insurance claims adjuster in Manitoba, and Christian (born 1955), an opera singer at the Mecklenburg State Theatre in Schwerin. Ingrid and Georg Hees frequently held singing evenings (Zabel evenings) with friends and participated in the Oberuferer Christmas plays. Another lifelong passion of Georg Hees was chess, which he played every Friday evening at his chess club.

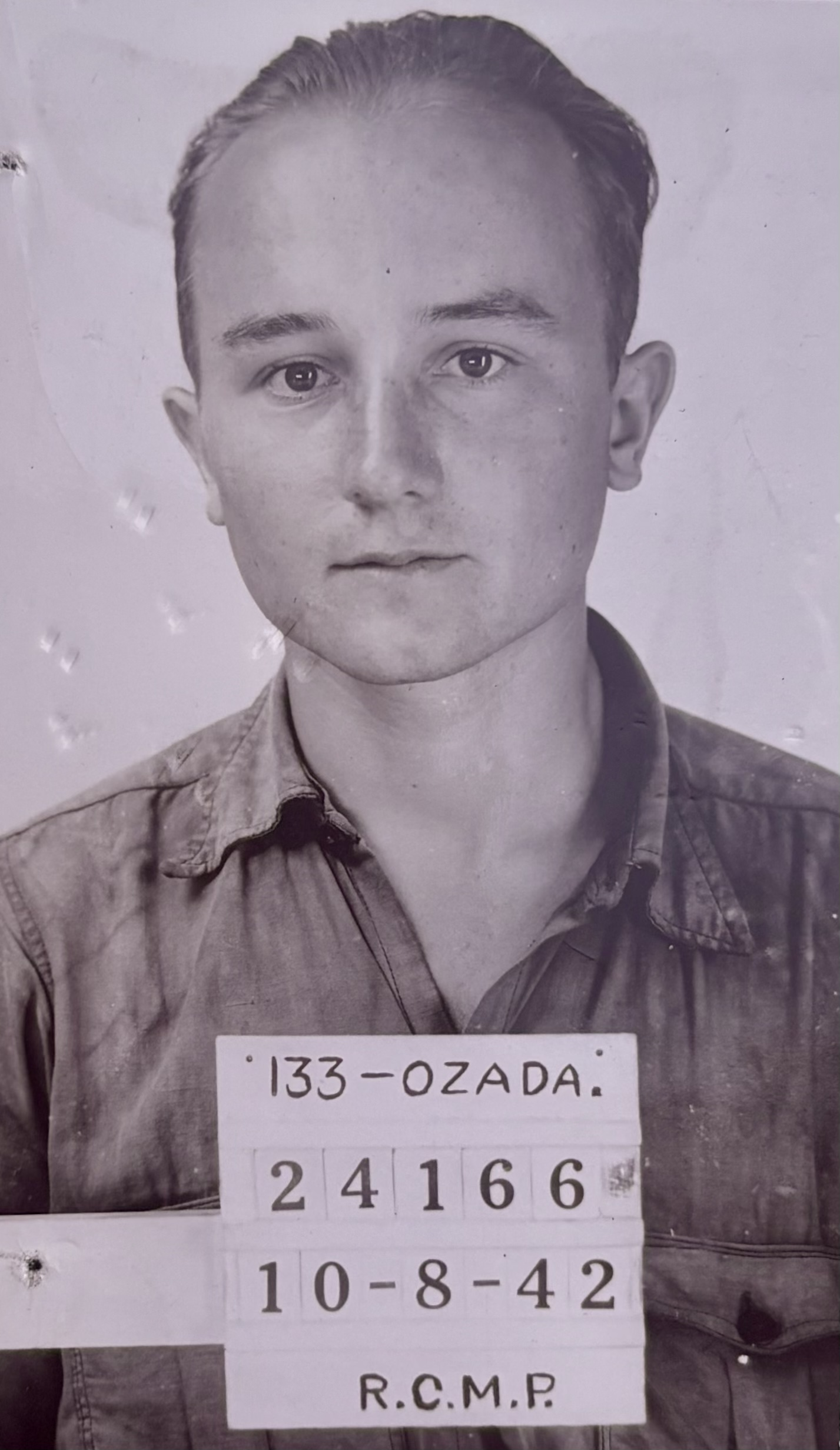
Georg Hees prisoner-of-war in Camp 133 Ozada in Canada (1942)

== Translator of Dante Alighieri's Divine Comedy ==
In 1995, Georg Hees published his prose translation of the Divine Comedy in a bilingual edition with extensive commentary, comprising over 2,200 pages. He based his work on the critical edition by Giovanni Andrea Scartazzini and Giuseppe Vandelli, as well as on the commentaries by Umberto Bosco and Giovanni Reggio, Hermann Gmelin, and Robert L. John (Vienna, 1946), who attempted to prove in his work that Dante belonged to a Templar congregation. In his foreword and in a series of notes, Hees emphatically points out that Rudolf Steiner repeatedly referred to Dante in his writings. "Scrupulous literalism is the striking feature of his work. He marks every addition that has no equivalent in the original but is necessary or at least helpful for understanding with square brackets. If one or two passages remain obscure, he usually explains them in a note. He also endeavors to retain the syntax of the Italian as far as possible, for example in the rendering of gerundial constructions, so that his translation occasionally comes close to the interlinear version propagated by Goethe. The principle of literalness is most striking in the lexical and phraseological areas."

Example (Inferno I 1–9):

In der Mitte des Weges unseres Lebens
fand ich mich in einem dunklen Walde wieder,
da [mir] der rechte Weg verloren gegangen war.

Ach, darüber zu sprechen, wie er war, ist schwer —
dieser wilde, unwegsame und unzugängliche Wald,
der [noch] in Gedanken die Angst erneuert!

So bitter ist er, daß der Tod [nur] wenig mehr ist; aber
um von dem Guten zu handeln, das ich dort fand, werde ich
[auch] von den anderen Dingen erzählen, die ich dort gesehen habe.

== Works ==
- Hees, Georg (1953). Der Einfluß von Brunetto Latinis 'Tesoretto' auf Dantes 'Divina Comedia' [The influence of Brunetto Latini's 'Tesoretto' on Dante's 'Divine Comedy'] (in German). Hamburg: University of Hamburg., Dissertation of March 10, 1953 (with resume)
- Hees, Georg (1995). Dante Alighieri. Divina Commedia. Inferno (in German). Dürnau: Verlag der Kooperative Dürnau. ISBN 978-3-88861-041-7. (bilingual edition with commentary)
- Hees, Georg (1995). Dante Alighieri. Divina Commedia. Purgatorio (in German). Dürnau: Verlag der Kooperative Dürnau. ISBN 978-3-88861-042-4. (bilingual edition with commentary)
- Hees, Georg (1995). Dante Alighieri. Divina Commedia. Paradiso (in German). Dürnau: Verlag der Kooperative Dürnau. ISBN 978-3-88861-043-1. (bilingual edition with commentary)
