= Angler POW escape =

Coordinates: 48.76°N 86.5853°W

In April 1941, inmates at the Angler POW Camp near Neys Provincial Park on the north shore of Lake Superior planned the largest escape from a Canadian POW camp during World War II. The escape was the largest of its kind in Ontario, Canada.

== Angler Camp background ==
The Angler Camp was designed to hold prisoners who were a threat to Canada. As a result, several German POWs were held there; however, the Angler Camp held not only enemy soldiers but also innocent Japanese Canadian citizens (who were not placed in the camp until about a year after the escape attempt). There were over 650 people of Japanese descent in the camp by the summer of 1942. Though they stayed in a camp with people who had threatened safety of Canadian citizens, the innocent Japanese Canadians had done nothing but been born into a Japanese family. They were not alone, however, as many other Canadian and American prisoner of war camps of World War II also held innocent citizens of foreign descent.

== Plan of escape ==
The prisoners' plan to escape included tools made from whatever they could find at the camp. For example, compasses were made from magnetized needles, prisoner uniforms were modeled to look like civilian clothes, and candles were made from tin cans filled with fat. A radio was obtained by blackmailing a guard and hidden inside a model of the German battleship Bismarck.

A tunnel was dug 45 m (150 ft) long that reached outside the wall, with side tunnels entering some of the barracks. The ground under and around the camp was mostly sand, making it easier for the prisoners to dig a tunnel. This, however, also made the ground less stable, and the prisoners faced the challenge of supporting the tunnel. They made reinforcements from wood braces taken from under the barracks. Unfortunately, three days of rain began to fill the tunnel with water. By noon on April 18, 1941, the day of the escape, the tunnel was already filled with 30 cm (12 inches) of water. That night, 80 prisoners attempted to escape; 28 made it outside the walls. The initial intent was for 100 prisoners to escape, but the escape was interrupted, when a guard heard noises made by the prisoners and alerted the rest of the camp.

== Killed or recaptured ==
Five of the escaped prisoners were found sleeping in a construction site, and were shot. The original report stated that they had rushed the two Canadian soldiers who found them, but later research indicated that four had been shot while still lying down, killing two of them, while the fifth had run into a nearby forest, where he was quickly captured.

Four others boarded a boxcar on a freight train, but were arrested by Royal Canadian Mounted Police officers riding on board. Most of the others were quickly apprehended. However, two prisoners, Horst Liebeck and Karl Heinz-Grund, boarded a westbound freight train and made it to Medicine Hat, Alberta before being recaptured and returned to the Angler camp. Though they were given 28 days of solitary confinement at the Camp for their actions, they were asked to sign autographs in Alberta before returning and were greeted upon their return by the Commandant who said, "As a sportsman, I congratulate you…" Horst Liebeck was sent back to Germany after the War with the other POWs, but he later returned to Canada and got a job there.

== Remembrance ==
Doug Mackey of Community Voices wrote an article called "Prisoners of War: Lest We Forget" that talks about the Gravenhurst Camp and Angler Camp, telling how important it is to remember the camps and the treatment of the prisoners in them.
