= Crumb Borne =

1965 novel by Clive Barry

- Author: Clive Barry
- Cover artist: Russell & Hinrichs
- Language: English
- Genre: Black humour, Naturalism, Absurdism
- Publisher: Faber & Faber; Penguin
- Publication date: 1965
- Publication place: Great Britain

Crumb Borne is a novella by Clive Barry, published in 1965. Fascinating critics with its hyper sensory descriptive style, deadpan absurdism, and pitch black humour, it was awarded the first ever Guardian Fiction Prize.

== Background ==
Set in a prisoner-of-war camp during World War II, Crumb Borne is, by turns, a painstaking dissection and perverse parody of its author's own lived experiences. As a dashing youth, Barry performed a well documented real-life escape, in a straightforward act of nerve and intrepidity befitting a Boys' Own article. But, as observed in The Observer, "Frugal"—Crumb Borne's "extraordinarily ugly and unpopular" protagonist—seeks his liberty in the most "marvellously eccentric and magical manner" possible.

== Critical reception ==
Reviewers variously compared Barry's "brutal comic compound disasters" to Beckett but with a "swifter and more sharply visual fantasy", his "extraordinary visual sense" to Grosz for "verbalising the peculiar line and force of an expressionist cartoonist", his descriptive method to Rolfe "but the details are smaller, sharper, and the ultimate picture more compelling" and his "black clowning" to "a more robust, less aesthetical Nabokov—the Nabokov of 'Invitation to a Beheading,' say."

Robert Nye, writing in The Guardian, characterised the book itself as too "recklessly original an outsider to walk away with an establishment prize". Ironically, months later, his own newspaper created a book award and made Crumb Borne its first first-prize winner.
