= Whitewater (POW camp) =

WW2 labour camp for German prisoners-of-war in Manitoba

Coordinates: 50.8161°N 100.3683°W

Whitewater was a labour camp for German prisoners-of-war in Riding Mountain National Park, Manitoba, Canada. Operating from 1943 to 1945, the camp was built on the northeast shore of Whitewater Lake, approximately 300 kilometres (190 mi) north-west of Winnipeg. The camp consisted of fifteen buildings and housed 440 to 450 prisoners of war.

== History ==
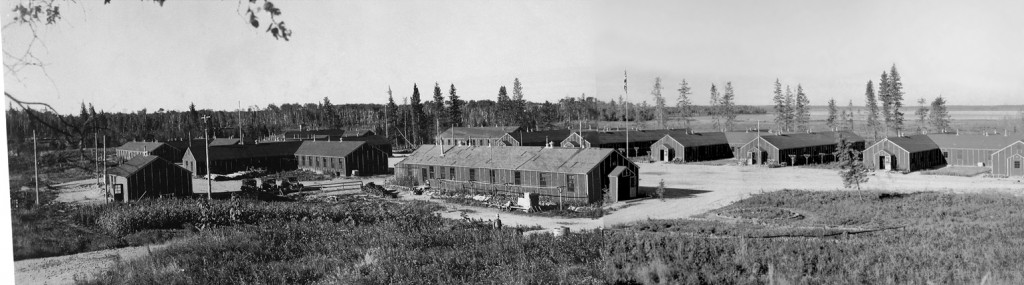
Prisoner of war camp in Riding Mountain National Park in 1944

The decision to have a prisoner of war labour project in Riding Mountain National Park was the result of a fuelwood shortage in the winter of 1942 and 1943. To free up men for the war effort it was decided that German prisoners of war would be employed. The majority of the prisoners were former members of the Afrika Korps, sent to Canada after being captured in battles like the Second Battle of El Alamein in North Africa.

Internees were paid 50 cents per day to cut down trees; prisoners were allowed to use their wages to order from the Eaton's catalogue. On one occasion, the prisoners threatened to strike because "pyjamas they'd ordered from the Eaton's catalogue failed to arrive on time" (they thought the guards might have stolen the order). However, relations between the prisoners and their guards were often amicable and it was rumoured that the camp staff were being supplied with alcohol distilled by the prisoners.

Whitewater was the only POW camp in North America not to be bounded by a fence or barbed wire, as its isolation made escape unfeasible. Members of the Veterans' Guard of Canada served as guards at the camp. However, prisoners quickly took advantage of their relative freedoms to explore their surroundings and fraternize with the locals. Many of these civilians were of Ukrainian descent and it is believed they were sympathetic to the German prisoners as they hoped that the Germany Army would overthrow the Soviets in Ukraine. As such, prisoners went drinking in town, courted local women, and attended dances. The prisoners were also allowed to have pets in the camp, one of which was a juvenile black bear.

Following the end of the war and the achievement of a fuelwood surplus, the camp closed in late 1945. That year an advertisement appeared in the Winnipeg Tribune soliciting the sale of the government-owned buildings. The remaining prisoners were transferred to other labour projects across the country while the buildings and amenities were auctioned off and removed from the park.

Today, little remains of the camp. In 2010 and 2011, a PhD Candidate from Stanford University and students from Brandon University ran an archaeological project at the site.
